= Corno di Gesero =

Mountain in Switzerland

- Location within Switzerland

Highest point
- Elevation: 2,227 m (7,306 ft)
- Prominence: 182 m (597 ft)
- Parent peak: Marmontana
- Coordinates: 46°11′08″N 9°07′53″E

Geography
- Location: Ticino/Graubünden, Switzerland
- Parent range: Lepontine Alps

The Corno di Gesero is a mountain of the Lepontine Alps, located on the border between the Swiss cantons of Ticino and Graubünden. It lies on the range west of the Cima di Cugn, between the Valle d'Arbedo and the Val Traversagna.
