= Leckihorn =

Mountain in Switzerland

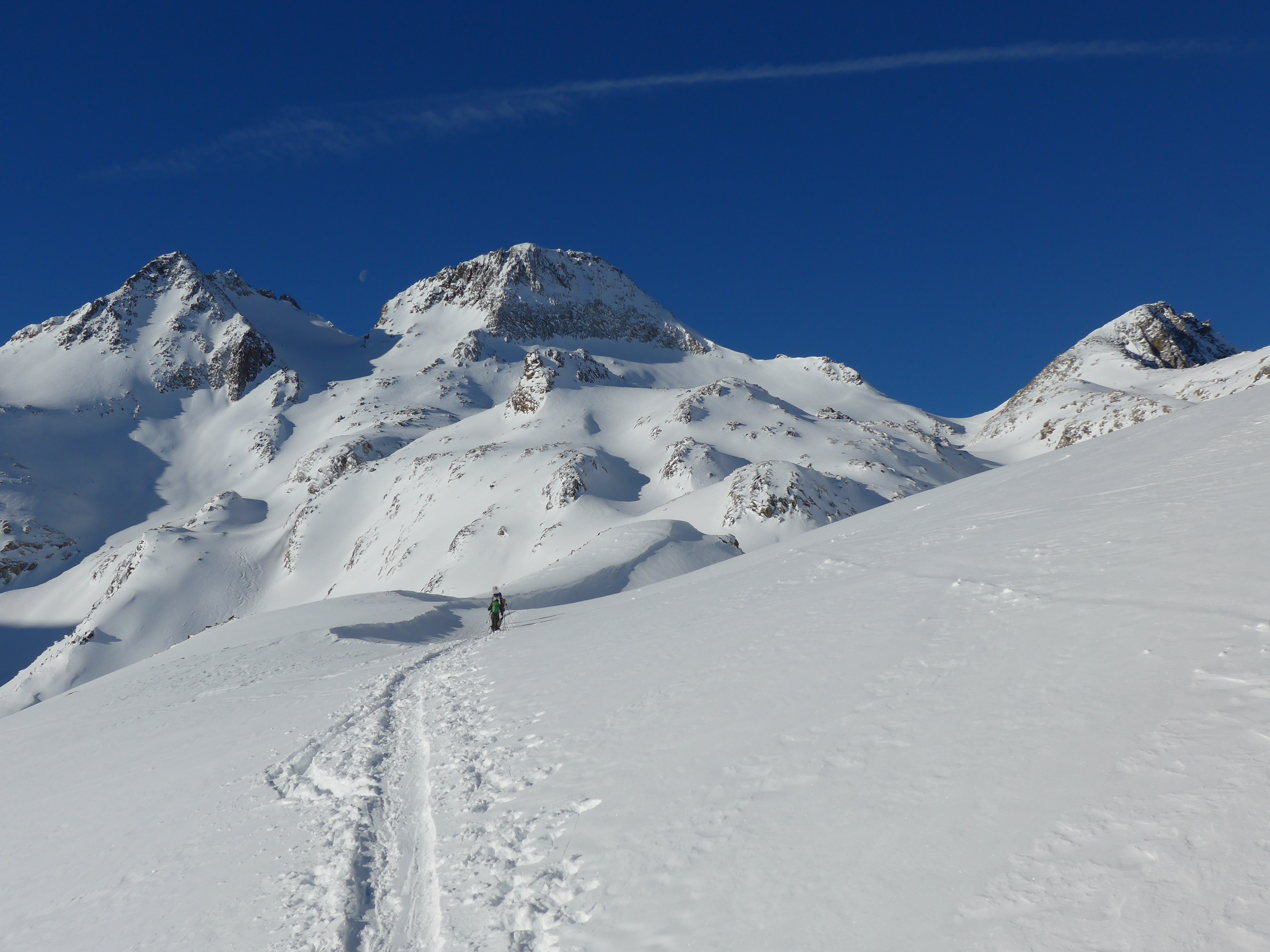
- Gross Leckihorn seen from northeast, on the left Chli Leckihorn

Highest point
- Elevation: 3,068 m (10,066 ft)
- Prominence: 222 m (728 ft)
- Parent peak: Gross Muttenhorn
- Coordinates: 46°32′9.2″N 8°27′50.5″E

Geography
- Location within Switzerland
- Location: Valais/Uri, Switzerland
- Parent range: Lepontine Alps

The Leckihorn is a mountain in the Lepontine Alps, located on the border between the cantons of Valais and Uri. Its summit is also named Gross Leckihorn (3,068 metres) to distinguish it from a lower summit (3,023 metres) named Chli Leckihorn.
