= Poncione di Piotta =

Mountain in Switzerland

- Location within Switzerland

Highest point
- Elevation: 2,439 m (8,002 ft)
- Prominence: 196 m (643 ft)
- Parent peak: Poncione del Vènn
- Coordinates: 46°15′13.9″N 8°55′27.3″E

Geography
- Location: Ticino, Switzerland
- Parent range: Lepontine Alps

The Poncione di Piotta is a mountain of the Swiss Lepontine Alps, located between Lavertezzo and Moleno in the canton of Ticino. It lies on the chain that separates the valley of Verzasca (west) from the Leventina valley (east).
