= Pizzo di Brünesc =

Mountain of the Lepontine Alps

- Pizzo di Brunescio
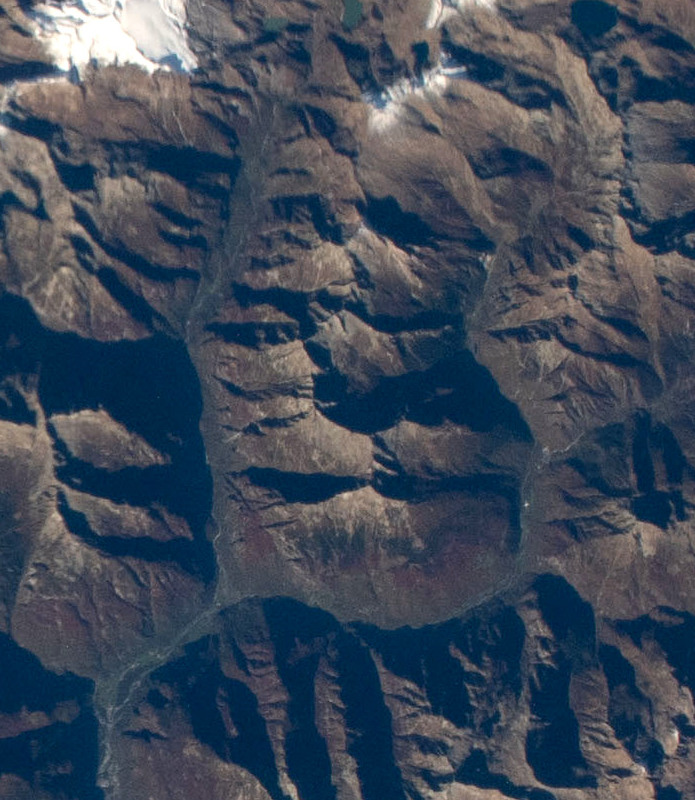
- Val Bavona, Pizzo di Brünesc, Pizzo Malora, Pizzo Castello, Val Lavizzara, valley Valle di Peccia

Highest point
- Elevation: 2,429 m (7,969 ft)
- Prominence: 153 m (502 ft)
- Parent peak: Basòdino
- Coordinates: 46°22′45.2″N 8°37′02.8″E

Geography
- Location within Switzerland
- Location: Ticino, Switzerland
- Parent range: Lepontine Alps

Pizzo di Brünesc (also known as Pizzo di Brunescio) is a mountain of the Lepontine Alps, overlooking Cavergno, in the canton of Ticino. It lies at the southern end of the chain between the Val Bavona and Valle di Peccia.
