= Madone (disambiguation) =

Madone is a town in the Italian region of Lombardy.

Madone may also refer to several mountains in the Swiss canton of Ticino:

- Madone (Locarno), a mountain north of Locarno
- Il Madone, a mountain near Airolo
- Madone di Càmedo, near Cevio

== See also ==
- Madonna (disambiguation)
