= Pizzo Peloso =

Mountain in Switzerland

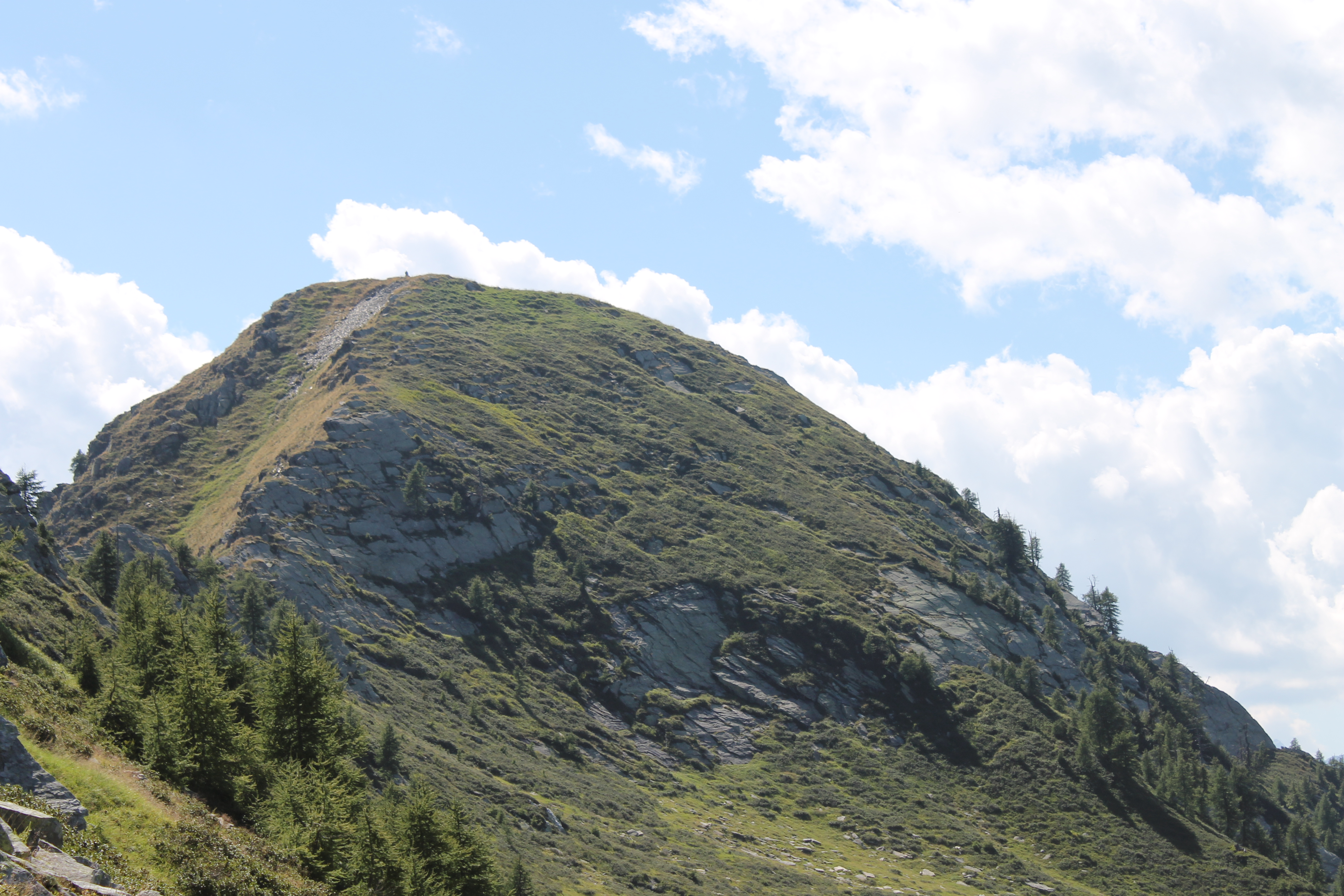
- Pizzo Peloso seen from Passo della Maggia

Highest point
- Elevation: 2,064 m (6,772 ft)
- Prominence: 260 m (850 ft)
- Coordinates: 46°13′58.8″N 8°38′57.9″E

Geography
- Location within Switzerland
- Location: Ticino, Switzerland
- Parent range: Lepontine Alps

Pizzo Peloso is a mountain in the Swiss Lepontine Alps, located west of Maggia in the canton of Ticino. It lies between the valleys of Vergeletto, Onsernone and Maggia. The closest higher summit is Pizzo Cramalina on the north-west side
