= Cima di Cugn =

Mountain in Switzerland

- Location within Alps

Highest point
- Elevation: 2,237 m (7,339 ft)
- Prominence: 52 m (171 ft)
- Parent peak: Marmontana
- Coordinates: 46°10′14.6″N 9°9′40.8″E

Geography
- Location: Lombardy, Italy/Graubünden, Switzerland
- Parent range: Lepontine Alps

Cima di Cugn is a mountain of the Lepontine Alps on the Swiss-Italian border. The tripoint between the cantons of Graubünden, Ticino and the region of Lombardy (2,194 m) is located 100 m south-west of the summit.
