= Cima de Nomnom =

Mountain in Switzerland

- Location within Switzerland

Highest point
- Elevation: 2,633 m (8,638 ft)
- Prominence: 246 m (807 ft)
- Parent peak: Piz de Groven
- Coordinates: 46°20′25″N 9°09′28″E

Geography
- Location: Graubünden, Switzerland
- Parent range: Lepontine Alps

Cima de Nomnom is a mountain of the Lepontine Alps, overlooking Cauco in the Swiss canton of Graubünden. It lies on the range between the Val Calanca and the Val Mesolcina, north of Piz de Groven.
