= Crap Grisch =

Mountain in Switzerland

- Planggenhorn
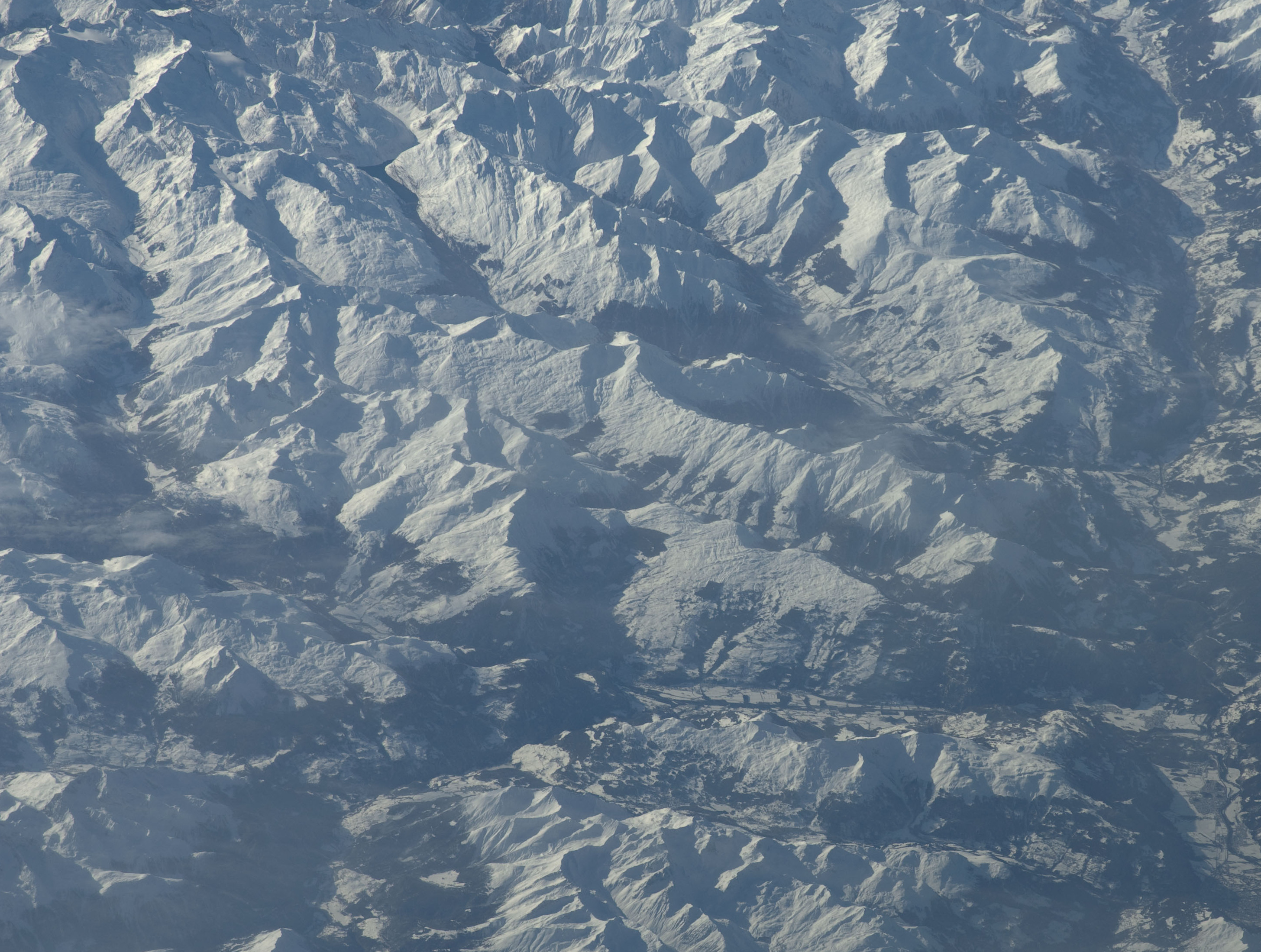
- Crap Grisch Plangghora and Piz Tomül Wissasteihora, valleys

Highest point
- Elevation: 2,861 m (9,386 ft)
- Prominence: 275 m (902 ft)
- Parent peak: Piz Tomül
- Coordinates: 46°39′17.5″N 9°13′58.1″E

Geography
- Location within Switzerland
- Location: Graubünden, Switzerland
- Parent range: Lepontine Alps

Crap Grisch (also known as Planggenhorn) is a mountain of the Lepontine Alps, situated between Vals and Safien in the canton of Graubünden in Switzerland.
