= Pizzo Cramalina =

Mountain in Switzerland

- Location within Switzerland

Highest point
- Elevation: 2,322 m (7,618 ft)
- Prominence: 297 m (974 ft)
- Parent peak: Rosso di Ribia
- Coordinates: 46°15′19.3″N 8°37′25.8″E

Geography
- Location: Ticino, Switzerland
- Parent range: Lepontine Alps

Pizzo Cramalina is a mountain of the Swiss Lepontine Alps, overlooking Vergeletto in the canton of Ticino. It lies on the chain between the valleys of Vergeletto and Maggia.
