= Sabbione =

Sabbione is an Italian surname. Notable people with the surname include:

- Alberto Sabbione (born 1948), Argentine field hockey player
- Alessio Sabbione (born 1991), Italian footballer
- Jorge Sabbione (born 1948), Argentine field hockey player

== See also ==
- Sabbione, Reggio Emilia, province of Reggio Emilia, Italy
- Lake Sabbione, lake in Verbano-Cusio-Ossola, Piemonte, Italy
- Punta del Sabbione
