= Cima di Piancabella =

Mountain in Switzerland

- Location within Switzerland

Highest point
- Elevation: 2,671 m (8,763 ft)
- Prominence: 59 m (194 ft)
- Parent peak: Cima di Gana Bianca
- Coordinates: 46°26′52.8″N 9°0′1.6″E

Geography
- Location: Ticino, Switzerland
- Parent range: Lepontine Alps

Cima di Piancabella is a mountain of the Swiss Lepontine Alps, overlooking Malvaglia in the canton of Ticino. It is located south of the Cima di Gana Bianca.
