= Rosso di Ribia =

Mountain in Switzerland

- Location within Switzerland

Highest point
- Elevation: 2,547 m (8,356 ft)
- Prominence: 569 m (1,867 ft)
- Listing: Alpine mountains 2500-2999 m
- Coordinates: 46°15′39.9″N 8°31′47.9″E

Geography
- Location: Ticino, Switzerland
- Parent range: Lepontine Alps

The Rosso di Ribia is a mountain of the Lepontine Alps, located in the canton of Ticino, Switzerland. with a height of 2,547 metres above sea level, it is the culminating point on the range between the Valle di Campo and Valle di Vergeletto. The Rosso di Ribia lies five kilometres east of Pizzo di Porcarese, where the border with Italy runs.
