= Pala da Tgiern =

Mountain in Switzerland

- Location within Switzerland

Highest point
- Elevation: 2,279 m (7,477 ft)
- Prominence: 74 m (243 ft)
- Parent peak: Rheinwaldhorn
- Coordinates: 46°41′18.3″N 9°13′09.4″E

Geography
- Location: Graubünden, Switzerland
- Parent range: Lepontine Alps

The Pala da Tgiern is a mountain of the Swiss Lepontine Alps, overlooking Suraua in the canton of Graubünden. It lies north of the Crap Grisch, in the Val Lumnezia.
