= Saashörner =

Mountain in Switzerland

- Location within Switzerland

Highest point
- Elevation: 3,039 m (9,970 ft)
- Prominence: 159 m (522 ft)
- Parent peak: Muttenhorn
- Coordinates: 46°31′34″N 8°25′56″E

Geography
- Location: Valais, Switzerland
- Parent range: Lepontine Alps

The Saashörner are a multi-summited mountain of the Lepontine Alps, located east of Oberwald in the canton of Valais.
