= Pizzo Campanile =

Mountain in Switzerland

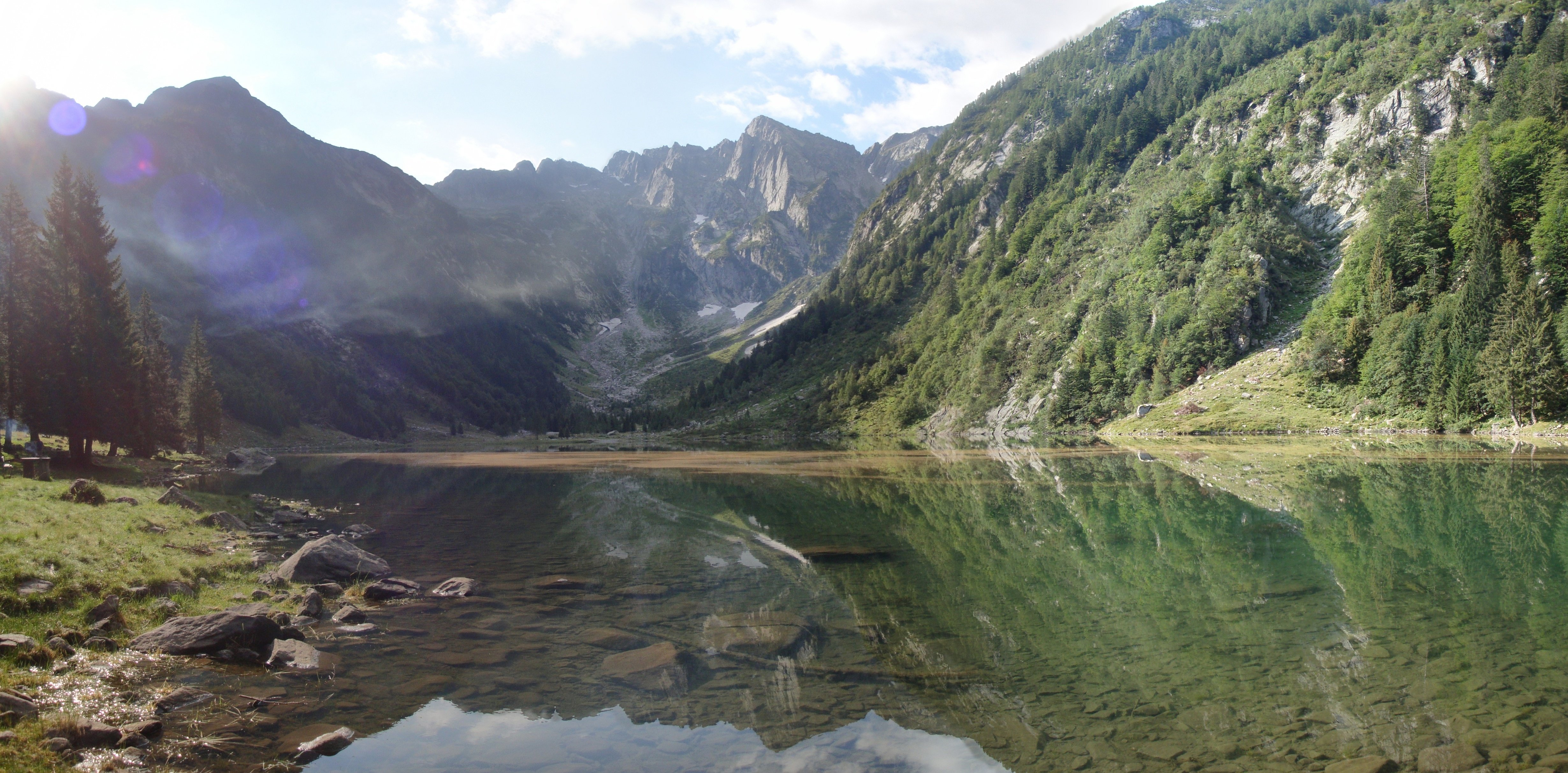
- View from Val Cama

Highest point
- Elevation: 2,458 m (8,064 ft)
- Prominence: 188 m (617 ft)
- Parent peak: Pizzo Paglia
- Coordinates: 46°13′56″N 9°14′44″E

Geography
- Location within Alps
- Location: Lombardy, Italy/Graubünden, Switzerland
- Parent range: Lepontine Alps

Pizzo Campanile is a mountain of the Lepontine Alps on the Swiss-Italian border. On its northern side it overlooks the Val Cama.
