= Pizzo Muncréch =

Mountain in Switzerland

- Location within Switzerland

Highest point
- Elevation: 2,252 m (7,388 ft)
- Prominence: 72 m (236 ft)
- Parent peak: Rheinwaldhorn
- Coordinates: 46°24′00″N 9°01′08″E

Geography
- Location: Ticino, Switzerland
- Parent range: Lepontine Alps

Pizzo Muncréch is a mountain in the Swiss Lepontine Alps, overlooking Malvaglia in the canton of Ticino. It is located west of Piz di Strega, between the valleys of Combra and Pontirone.
