= Turbhorn =

Mountain in Switzerland

- Location within Switzerland

Highest point
- Elevation: 3,246 m (10,650 ft)
- Prominence: 228 m (748 ft)
- Parent peak: Blinnenhorn
- Coordinates: 46°24′29″N 8°16′50″E

Geography
- Location: Valais, Switzerland
- Parent range: Lepontine Alps

The Turbhorn is a mountain of the Lepontine Alps, located in the canton of Valais south of the Blinnenhorn. The border with Italy runs less than one km east of the summit.
