= Rasiva =

Mountain in Switzerland

- Location within Switzerland

Highest point
- Elevation: 2,684 m (8,806 ft)
- Prominence: 284 m (932 ft)
- Parent peak: Monte Zucchero
- Coordinates: 46°20′08″N 8°43′49″E

Geography
- Location: Ticino, Switzerland
- Parent range: Lepontine Alps

The Rasiva is a mountain of the Swiss Lepontine Alps, located north-west of Brione in the canton of Ticino. It lies on the range east of Monte Zucchero, between the Val Redòrta and the Val d'Osura.
