= Piz di Strega =

Mountain in Switzerland

- Location within Switzerland

Highest point
- Elevation: 2,912 m (9,554 ft)
- Prominence: 91 m (299 ft)
- Parent peak: Pizzo del Ramulazz
- Coordinates: 46°23′20.1″N 9°5′14.4″E

Geography
- Location: Switzerland
- Parent range: Lepontine Alps

Piz di Strega is a mountain in the Lepontine Alps, overlooking Pass Giümela on the border between the cantons of Ticino and Graubünden. Its summit lies south of Pizzo di Ramulazz.
