= Poncione dei Laghetti =

Mountain in Switzerland

- Poncione della Bolla
- Location within Switzerland

Highest point
- Elevation: 2,616 m (8,583 ft)
- Coordinates: 46°28′0″N 8°35′41.6″E

Geography
- Location: Ticino, Switzerland
- Parent range: Lepontine Alps

The Poncione dei Laghetti (also known as Poncione della Bolla) is a mountain of the Lepontine Alps, overlooking the lakes Lago del Narèt and Lago del Sambuco in the canton of Ticino in Switzerland.
