= Piz de Groven =

Mountain in Switzerland

- Location within Switzerland

Highest point
- Elevation: 2,694 m (8,839 ft)
- Prominence: 433 m (1,421 ft)
- Parent peak: Cima de Gagela
- Coordinates: 46°19′05″N 9°09′33″E

Geography
- Location: Graubünden, Switzerland
- Parent range: Lepontine Alps

Piz de Groven is a mountain of the Lepontine Alps, located between Selma and Lostallo in the Swiss canton of Graubünden. With an elevation of 2,694 metres above sea level, it is the highest summit of the chain south of Pass de Buffalora (2,261 metres).
