= Piz de Mucia =

Mountain in Switzerland

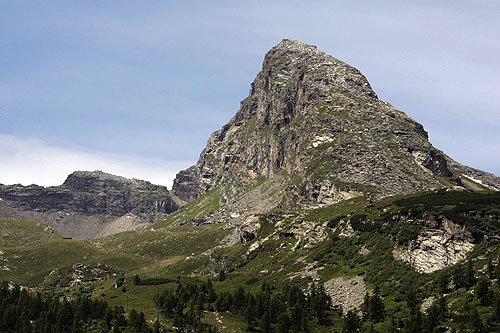
- View from San Bernardino (east side)

Highest point
- Elevation: 2,967 m (9,734 ft)
- Prominence: 258 m (846 ft)
- Parent peak: Rheinwaldhorn
- Coordinates: 46°27′57.2″N 9°08′14.8″E

Geography
- Location within Switzerland
- Location: Graubünden, Switzerland
- Parent range: Lepontine Alps

Piz de Mucia is a mountain of the Swiss Lepontine Alps, overlooking San Bernardino in the canton of Graubünden. It lies south-east of the Zapporthorn, between the valleys of Calanca and Mesolcina.
