= Crest dil Cut =

Mountain in Switzerland

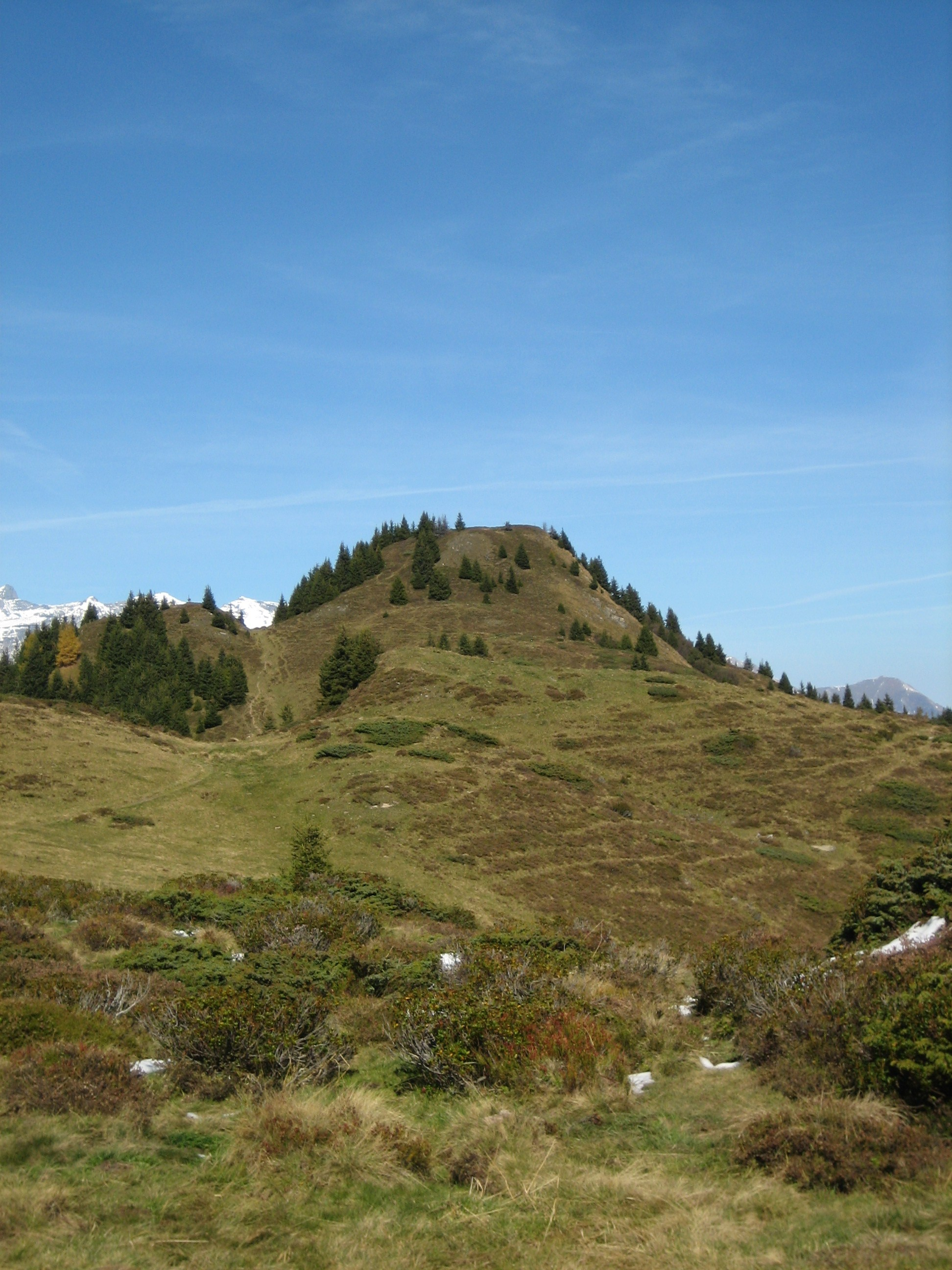
- View from the south side

Highest point
- Elevation: 2,016 m (6,614 ft)
- Prominence: 61 m (200 ft)
- Parent peak: Lüschgrat
- Coordinates: 46°45′56.28″N 9°22′56.28″E

Geography
- Location within Switzerland
- Location: Graubünden, Switzerland
- Parent range: Lepontine Alps

The Crest dil Cut (also known as Cresta dil Cot) is a mountain of the Swiss Lepontine Alps, situated west of Rothenbrunnen in the canton of Graubünden. It lies near the northern end of the range separating the Safiental from the Domleschg valley.
