= Piz Riein =

Mountain in Switzerland

- Location within Switzerland

Highest point
- Elevation: 2,762 m (9,062 ft)
- Prominence: 81 m (266 ft)
- Parent peak: Piz Fess
- Coordinates: 46°44′25.9″N 9°17′34.5″E

Geography
- Location: Graubünden, Switzerland
- Parent range: Lepontine Alps

Piz Riein is a mountain of the Lepontine Alps, situated south-east of Ilanz in the canton of Graubünden. It lies on the range between the Val Lumnezia and Safiental, named Cadeina dil Signina.
