= Punta Valgrande =

Mountain in Switzerland

- Location within Alps

Highest point
- Elevation: 2,857 m (9,373 ft)
- Prominence: 109 m (358 ft)
- Parent peak: Monte Leone
- Coordinates: 46°13′34″N 8°08′20″E

Geography
- Location: Valais, Switzerland; Piedmont, Italy
- Parent range: Lepontine Alps

The Punta Valgrande is a mountain of the Lepontine Alps, located on the border between Switzerland and Italy. The west side belongs to the Swiss canton of Valais and the east side belongs to the Italian region of Piedmont.

The closest locality is Gondo, on the south side.
