= Piz Maler =

Mountain in Switzerland

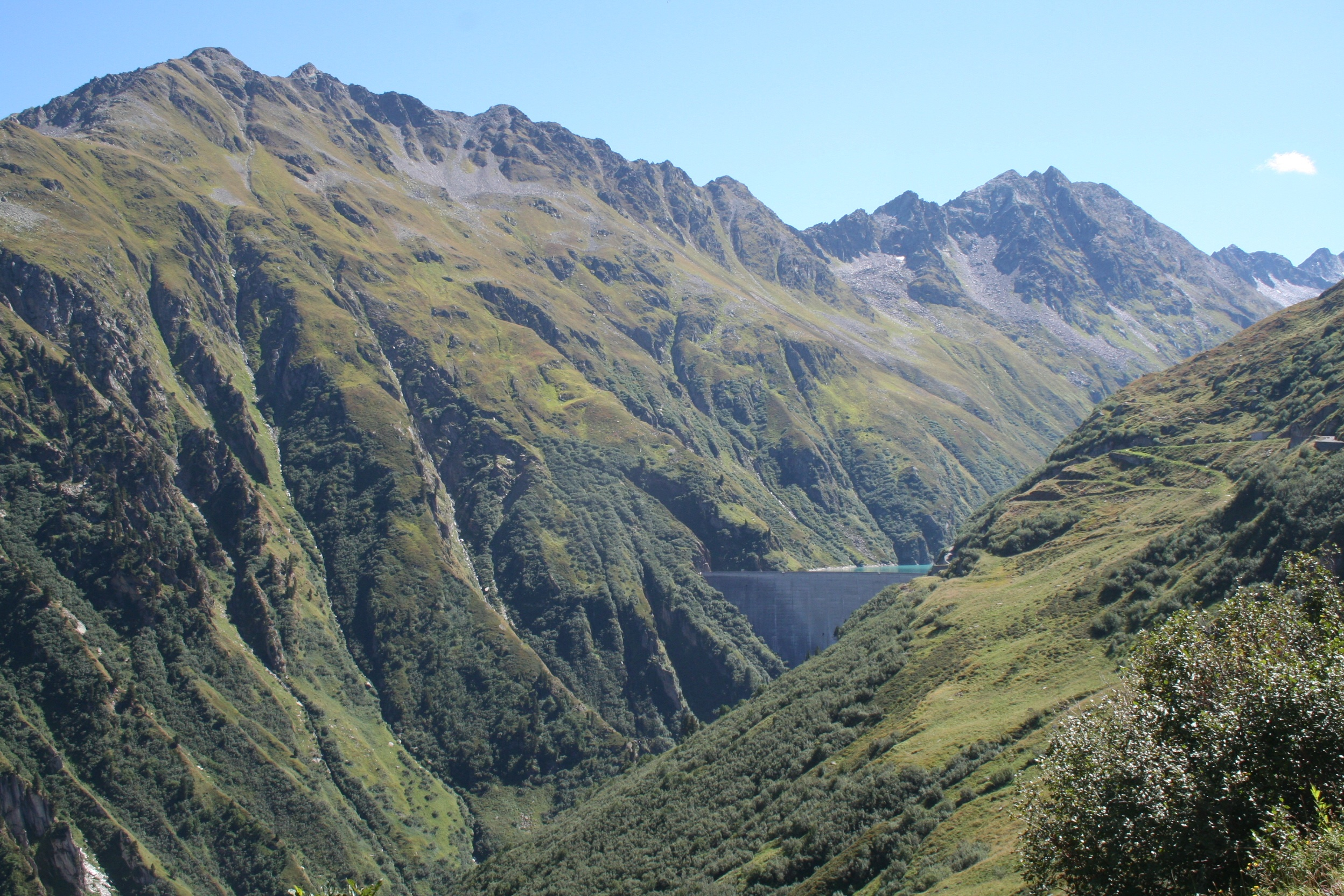
- Overview of the valley of Lai da Curnera with Piz Maler at the top left. It is highlighted in the full view of the image.

Highest point
- Elevation: 2,790 m (9,150 ft)
- Prominence: 210 m (690 ft)
- Parent peak: Piz Gannaretsch
- Coordinates: 46°38′01.5″N 8°43′55.3″E

Geography
- Location within Switzerland
- Location: Graubünden, Switzerland
- Parent range: Lepontine Alps

Piz Maler is a mountain of the Swiss Lepontine Alps, located south of Sedrun in the canton of Graubünden. It lies at the northern end of the range between Lai da Curnera and Lai da Nalps.
