= Pizzo di Boccareccio =

Mountain in Italy

Coordinates: 46°17′52″N 8°12′10″E

Highest point
- Elevation: 3,027 m (9,931 ft)

Geography
- Location: Piedmont, Italy
- Parent range: Lepontine Alps

The Pizzo di Boccareccio is a mountain of Piedmont, Italy, with an elevation of 3,027 metres (9,931 ft). Part of the Lepontine Alps, it is located on the border between the municipalities of Varzo and Baceno, in the Province of Verbano-Cusio-Ossola.

Along with Helsenhorn, Punta di Boccareccio and Punta delle Caldaie, it forms the ridge that divides the Alpe Veglia from the Alpe Devero. The peak is part of the Alpe Veglia and Alpe Devero Natural Park, and can be climbed starting from Bivacco Combi e Lanza.
