= Präzer Höhi =

Mountain in Switzerland

- Mutta
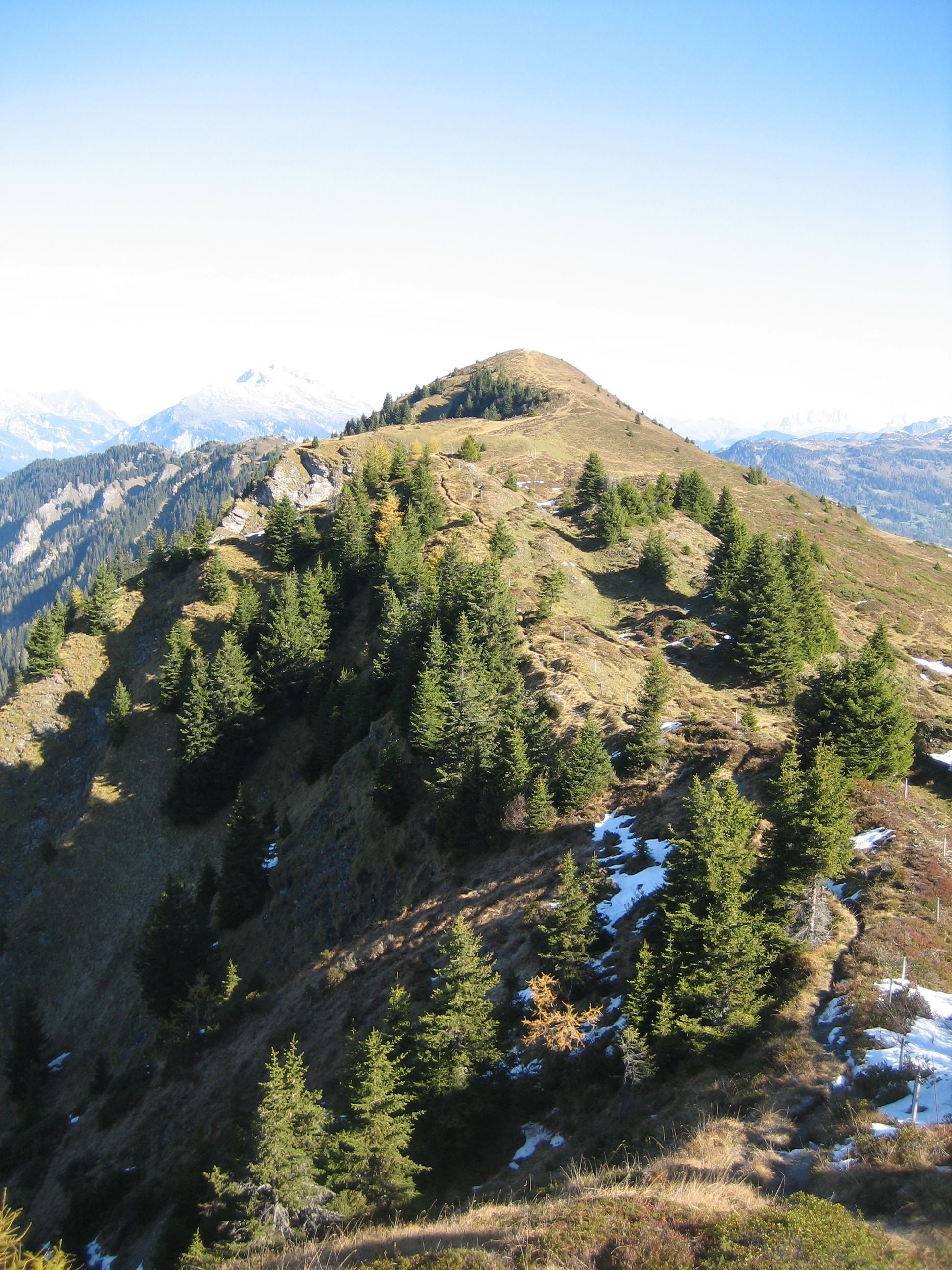
- View from the south side

Highest point
- Elevation: 2,120 m (6,960 ft)
- Prominence: 45 m (148 ft)
- Parent peak: Tguma
- Coordinates: 46°44′21.2″N 9°22′24.9″E

Geography
- Location within Switzerland
- Location: Graubünden, Switzerland
- Parent range: Lepontine Alps

The Präzer Höhi (also known as Mutta) is a mountain of the Swiss Lepontine Alps, situated near Thusis in the canton of Graubünden. It lies on the range between the valleys of Safien and Domleschg.
