= Pizzo di Cassimoi =

Mountain in the Lepontine Alps, Switzerland

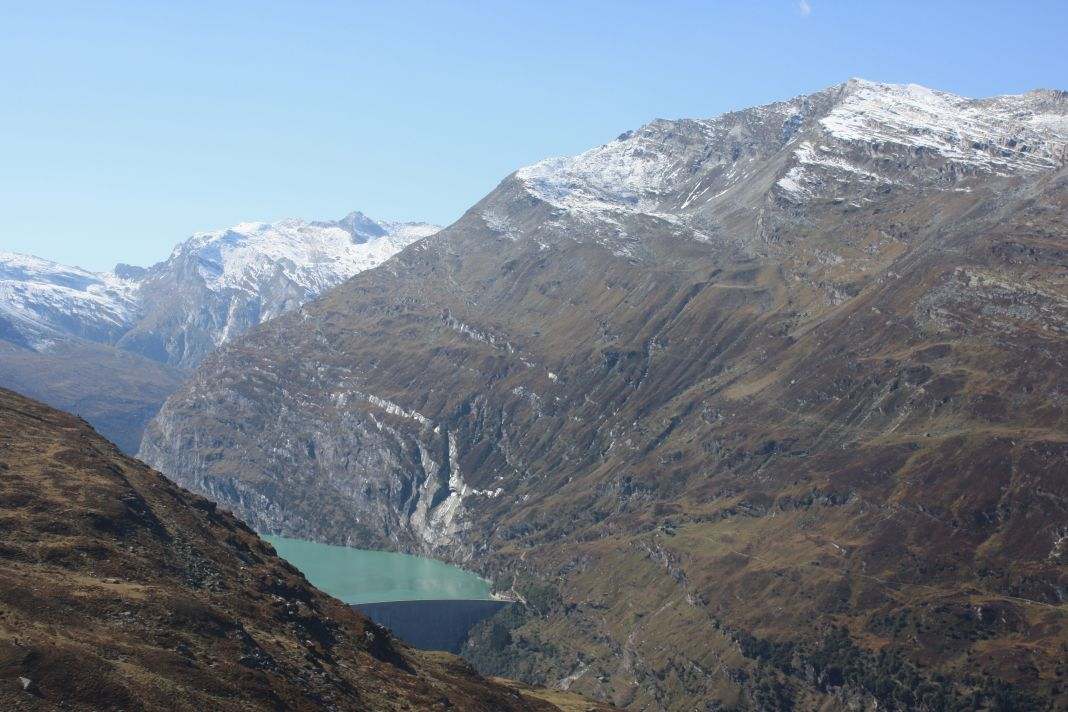
- Pizzo di Cassimoi (far left) from above Zervreilasee

Highest point
- Elevation: 3,129 m (10,266 ft)
- Prominence: 242 m (794 ft)
- Parent peak: Rheinwaldhorn
- Coordinates: 46°31′44″N 9°01′05″E

Geography
- Location within Switzerland
- Location: Ticino/Graubünden, Switzerland
- Parent range: Lepontine Alps

Pizzo di Cassimoi is a mountain of the Lepontine Alps, located on the border between the Swiss cantons of Ticino (west) and Graubünden (east). The mountain overlooks two lakes: Lago di Luzzone on its north-eastern side and Zervreilasee on its north-eastern side.

A glacier named Vadrecc di Sorda lies over the northern flanks below a secondary summit (Pizzo Cassinello, 3,103 metres) on the side of Ticino.
