= Poncione della Marcia =

Mountain in Switzerland

- Location within Switzerland

Highest point
- Elevation: 2,454 m (8,051 ft)
- Prominence: 170 m (560 ft)
- Parent peak: Monte Zucchero
- Coordinates: 46°19′10″N 8°45′57″E

Geography
- Location: Ticino, Switzerland
- Parent range: Lepontine Alps

The Poncione della Marcia is a mountain of the Swiss Lepontine Alps, overlooking Brione in the canton of Ticino. It lies at the eastern end the range east of Monte Zucchero, between the Val Redòrta and the Val d'Osura.
