= Piz Canal =

Mountain in Switzerland

- Location within Switzerland

Highest point
- Elevation: 2,846 m (9,337 ft)
- Prominence: 128 m (420 ft)
- Parent peak: Rheinwaldhorn
- Coordinates: 46°36′41.3″N 9°01′28.9″E

Geography
- Location: Graubünden, Switzerland
- Parent range: Lepontine Alps

Piz Canal (2,846 m) is a mountain of the Swiss Lepontine Alps, situated south-west of Vrin in the canton of Graubünden. It is located on the chain between the Val Sumvitg and the Lumnezia, north of Piz Terri.

On its southern flank lies a large named Laghet la Greina (2,585 m).
