= Piz de Cressim =

Mountain in Switzerland

- Piz de Roggione
- Location within Alps

Highest point
- Elevation: 2,575 m (8,448 ft)
- Parent peak: Piz della Forcola
- Coordinates: 46°15′59″N 9°15′02″E

Geography
- Location: Lombardy, Italy/Graubünden, Switzerland
- Parent range: Lepontine Alps

Piz de Cressim (also known as Piz de Roggione) is a mountain of the Lepontine Alps on the Swiss-Italian border. On its west side lies the Val Cama and on its east side lies the Valle Bodengo. It is popular among climbers and mountain walkers.
