= Piz Pombi =

Mountain in Switzerland

- Pizzo Forato
- Location within Alps

Highest point
- Elevation: 2,967 m (9,734 ft)
- Prominence: 257 m (843 ft)
- Parent peak: Piz Corbet
- Coordinates: 46°22′04″N 9°16′33″E

Geography
- Location: Lombardy, Italy/Graubünden, Switzerland
- Parent range: Lepontine Alps

Piz Pombi (also known as Pizzo Forato) is a mountain of the Lepontine Alps, located on the Swiss-Italian border. It overlooks Soazza on its western side.
