= Schlüechtli =

Mountain in Switzerland

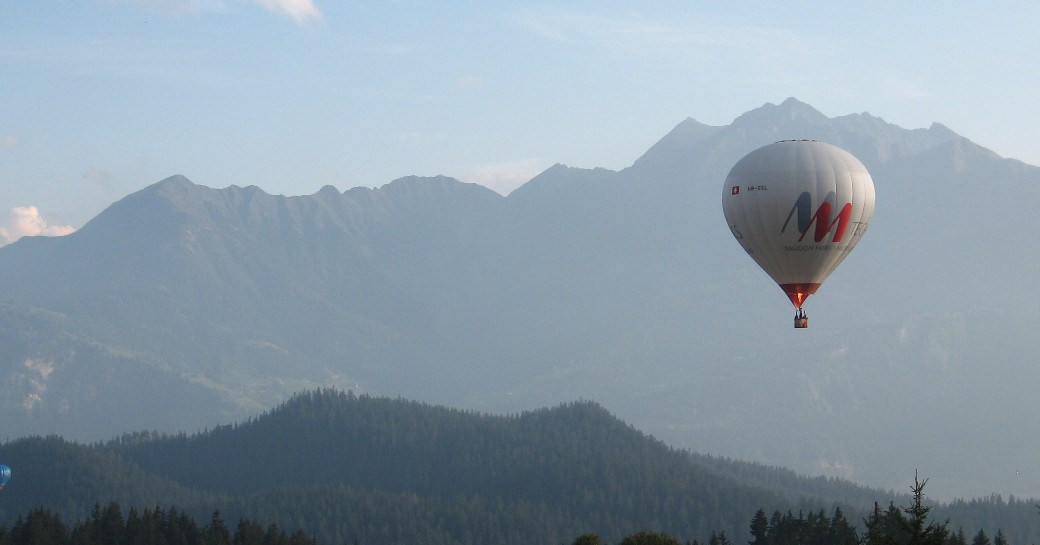
- Signina group from the north with Schlüechtli on the far left.

Highest point
- Elevation: 2,283 m (7,490 ft)
- Prominence: 83 m (272 ft)
- Parent peak: Rheinwaldhorn
- Coordinates: 46°45′32.4″N 9°19′24.8″E

Geography
- Location within Switzerland
- Location: Graubünden, Switzerland
- Parent range: Lepontine Alps

The Schlüechtli is a mountain of the Swiss Lepontine Alps, situated south of Versam in the canton of Graubünden. It lies between the valleys of Turischtobel and Safien, approximately 5 kilometres south of the anterior Rhine.
