= Madom da Sgióf =

Mountain in Switzerland

- Location within Switzerland

Highest point
- Elevation: 2,265 m (7,431 ft)
- Prominence: 229 m (751 ft)
- Coordinates: 46°16′05″N 8°46′34.1″E

Geography
- Location: Ticino, Switzerland
- Parent range: Lepontine Alps

The Madom da Sgióf is a mountain of the Swiss Lepontine Alps, located between Maggia and Brione in the canton of Ticino.
