= Piz de Setag =

Mountain in Switzerland

- Location within Alps

Highest point
- Elevation: 2,476 m (8,123 ft)
- Prominence: 101 m (331 ft)
- Parent peak: Piz della Forcola
- Coordinates: 46°17′44″N 9°16′52″E

Geography
- Location: Lombardy, Italy/Graubünden, Switzerland
- Parent range: Lepontine Alps

Piz de Setag is a mountain of the Lepontine Alps, located on the Swiss-Italian border. It is situated between the Val da Montogn (Graubünden) and Val Pilotera (Lombardy).
