= Pizzo di Campedell =

Mountain of the Lepontine Alps

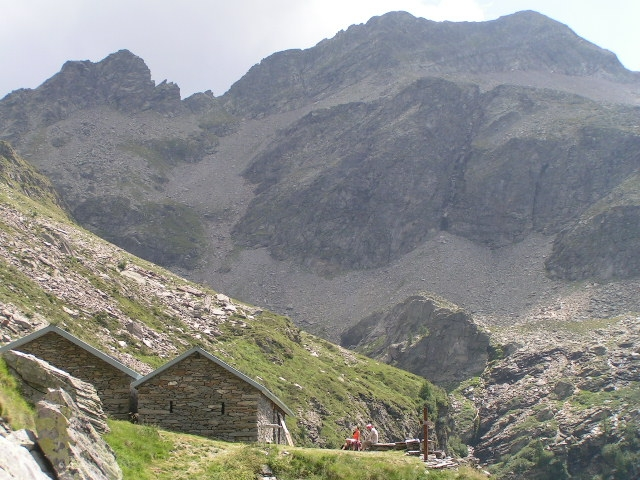
- View from Alpe d'Örz on the west side

Highest point
- Elevation: 2,724 m (8,937 ft)
- Prominence: 245 m (804 ft)
- Parent peak: Pizzo di Claro
- Coordinates: 46°19′31.1″N 9°03′51.8″E

Geography
- Location within Switzerland
- Location: Ticino/Graubünden, Switzerland
- Parent range: Lepontine Alps

Pizzo di Campedell is a mountain in the Lepontine Alps, located on the border between the Swiss cantons of Ticino and Graubünden. It lies on the range south of Torent Alto between the valley of the Ticino and the Val Calanca.
