= Piz Serenastga =

Mountain in Switzerland

- Location within Switzerland

Highest point
- Elevation: 2,874 m (9,429 ft)
- Prominence: 120 m (390 ft)
- Parent peak: Piz Aul
- Coordinates: 46°38′00.9″N 9°08′48″E

Geography
- Location: Graubünden, Switzerland
- Parent range: Lepontine Alps

Piz Serenastga is a mountain of the Swiss Lepontine Alps, situated near Vals in the canton of Graubünden. It is located north of Piz Aul.
