= Pizzo d'Orsalietta =

Mountain of the Swiss Lepontine Alps

- Location within Switzerland

Highest point
- Elevation: 2,476 m (8,123 ft)
- Prominence: 157 m (515 ft)
- Parent peak: Basòdino
- Coordinates: 46°20′37.2″N 8°32′11″E

Geography
- Location: Ticino, Switzerland
- Parent range: Lepontine Alps

Pizzo d'Orsalietta is a mountain of the Swiss Lepontine Alps, located west of Cevio in the canton of Ticino. It lies between the valleys of Bavona and Bosco/Gurin.
