= Cima della Bianca =

Mountain in Switzerland

- Location within Switzerland

Highest point
- Elevation: 2,893 m (9,491 ft)
- Prominence: 234 m (768 ft)
- Parent peak: Scopi
- Coordinates: 46°34′22.9″N 8°51′46.9″E

Geography
- Location: Graubünden/Ticino, Switzerland
- Parent range: Lepontine Alps

The Cima della Bianca is a mountain of the Lepontine Alps and located on the border between the cantons of Ticino and Graubünden. It is in Switzerland and lies east of the Scopi.
