= Punta della Rossa =

Mountain in Italy

- Rothorn
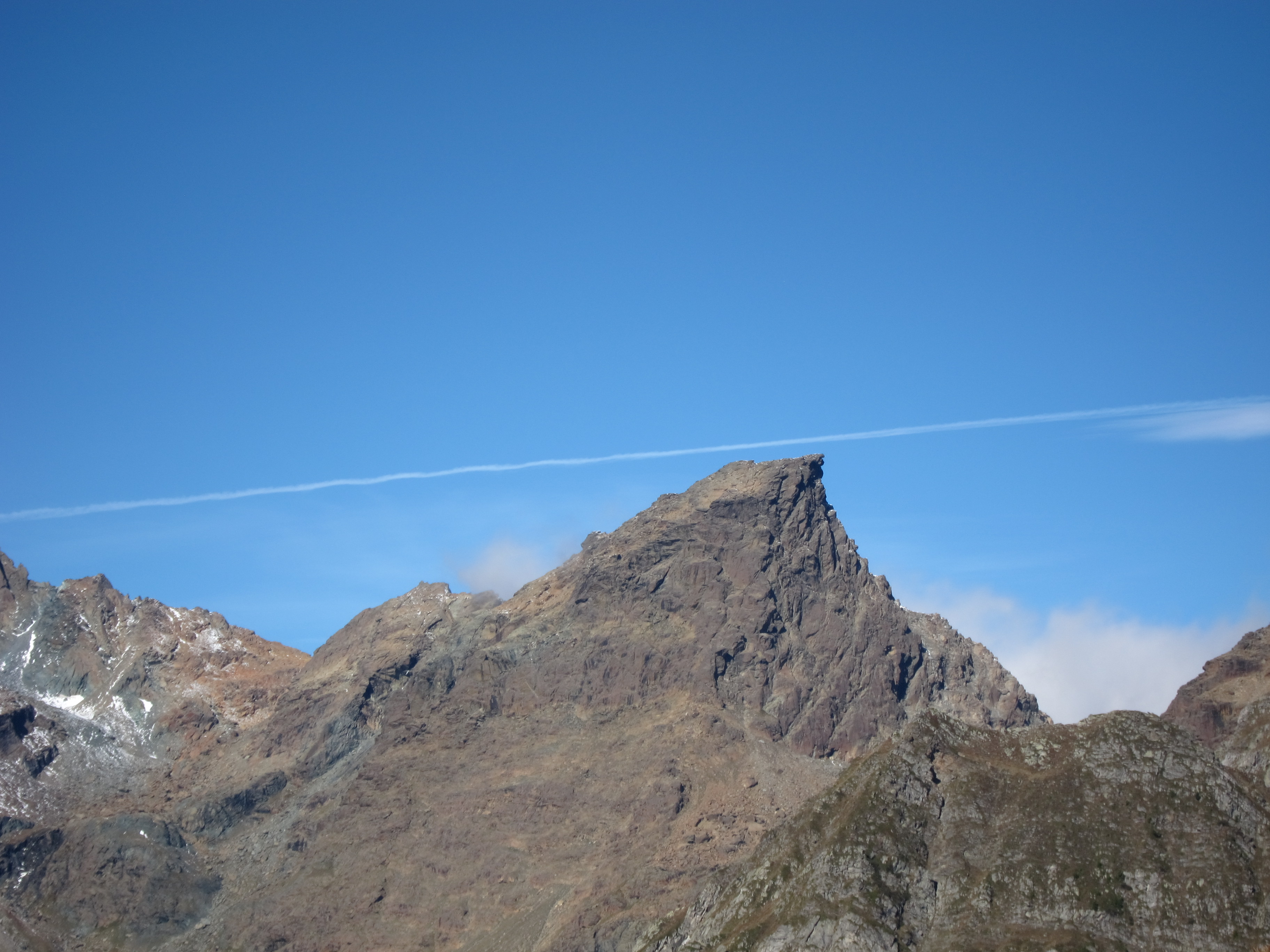
- View from the Mount Corbernas (Devero Valley)

Highest point
- Elevation: 2,888 m (9,475 ft)
- Coordinates: 46°12′15″N 8°09′13″E

Geography
- Location within Alps
- Location: Piedmont, Italy/Valais, Switzerland
- Parent range: Lepontine Alps

The Punta della Rossa (also known as Rothorn) is a mountain of the Lepontine Alps on the Swiss-Italian border. The name of the mount, in both languages, refers to the red colour of the rocks on this mountain.

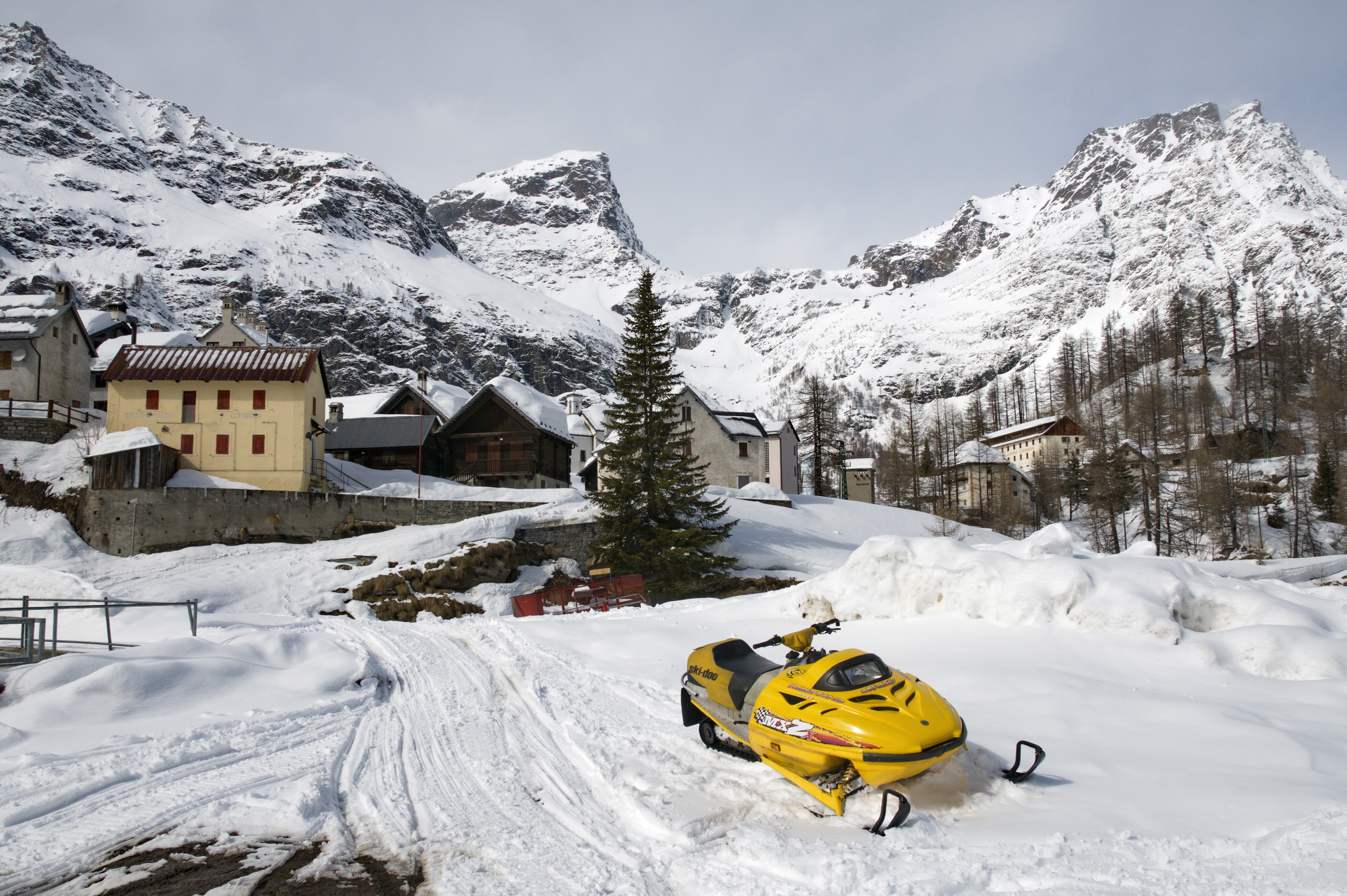
Punta della Rossa in winter

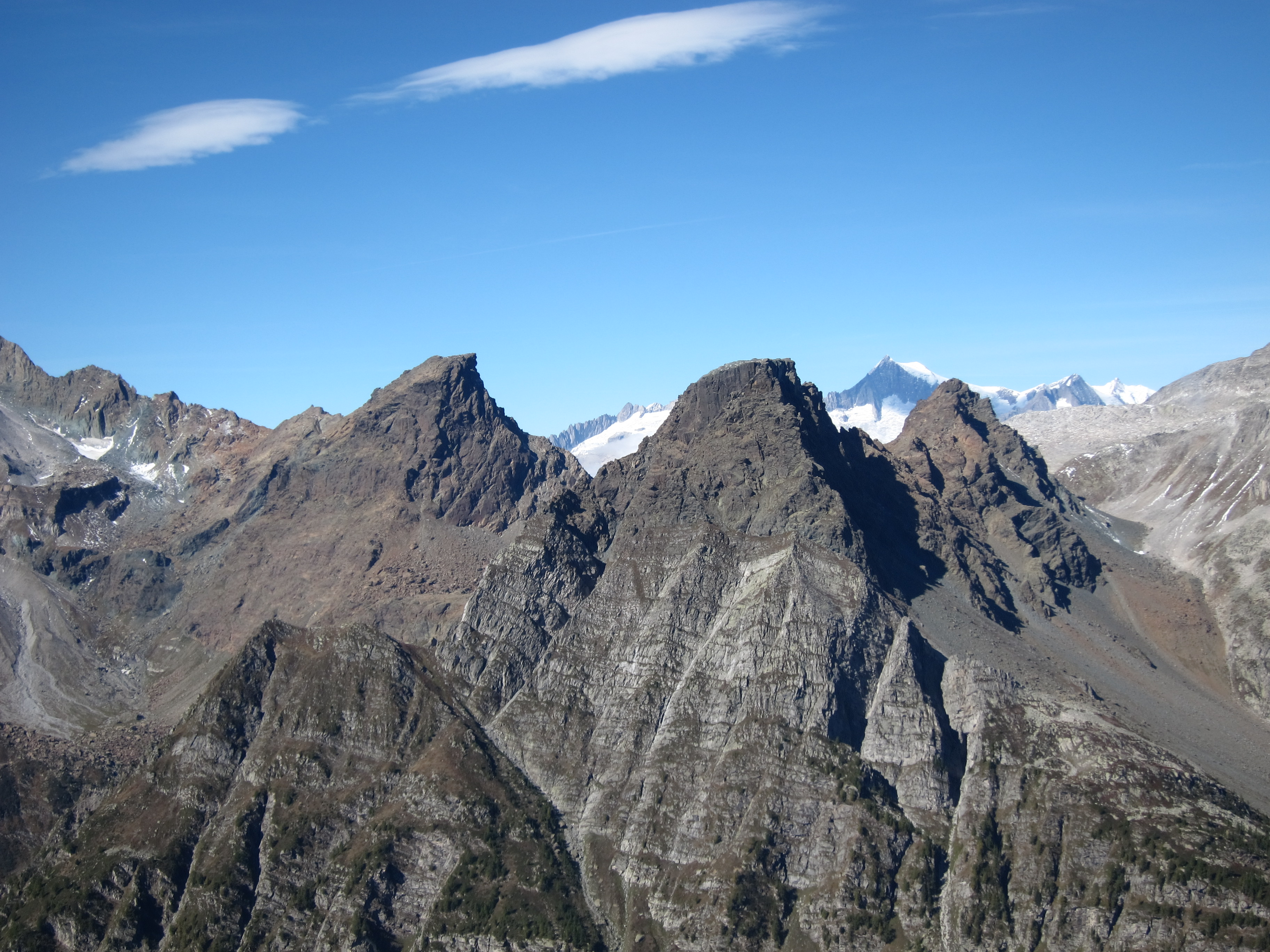
Punta della Rossa on the left
