= Pizzo d'Orsalia =

Mountain in Switzerland

- Location within Switzerland

Highest point
- Elevation: 2,664 m (8,740 ft)
- Prominence: 135 m (443 ft)
- Parent peak: Wandfluhhorn
- Coordinates: 46°20′21″N 8°30′24.2″E

Geography
- Location: Ticino, Switzerland
- Parent range: Lepontine Alps

Pizzo d'Orsalia is a mountain of the Swiss Lepontine Alps, overlooking Bosco/Gurin in the canton of Ticino. It lies on the chain that separates the Val Calnègia from the Valle di Bosco/Gurin.
