= Hohsandhorn =

Mountain in Switzerland

- Punta del Sabbione
- Location within Alps

Highest point
- Elevation: 3,182 m (10,440 ft)
- Prominence: 138 m (453 ft)
- Parent peak: Turbhorn
- Coordinates: 46°24′15″N 8°18′35″E

Geography
- Location: Piedmont, Italy/Valais, Switzerland
- Parent range: Lepontine Alps

The Hohsandhorn (also known as Punta del Sabbione) is a mountain of the Lepontine Alps on the Swiss-Italian border.
