= Fibbia =

Mountain in Switzerland

- Location within Switzerland

Highest point
- Elevation: 2,738 m (8,983 ft)
- Coordinates: 46°32′34.2″N 8°32′51.2″E

Geography
- Location: Ticino, Switzerland
- Parent range: Lepontine Alps

The Fibbia is a 2,738 m (8,983 ft) high mountain in the Swiss Lepontine Alps; the Fibbia overlooks the Gotthard Pass, in the canton of Ticino.
