= Pizzo di Cadrèigh =

Mountain of the Lepontine Alps

- Location within Switzerland

Highest point
- Elevation: 2,516 m (8,255 ft)
- Prominence: 115 m (377 ft)
- Parent peak: Scopi
- Coordinates: 46°32′51″N 8°50′33″E

Geography
- Location: Ticino, Switzerland
- Parent range: Lepontine Alps

Pizzo di Cadrèigh (2,516 m) is a mountain of the Swiss Lepontine Alps, located west of Olivone in the canton of Ticino. It lies south of the Scopi, between the Val di Campo and the Valle Santa Maria.
