= Piz Pazzola =

Mountain in Switzerland

- Location within Switzerland

Highest point
- Elevation: 2,581 m (8,468 ft)
- Prominence: 24 m (79 ft)
- Coordinates: 46°38′43″N 8°48′53.3″E

Geography
- Location: Graubünden, Switzerland
- Parent range: Lepontine Alps

Piz Pazzola is a mountain of the Swiss Lepontine Alps, situated near Sedrun in the canton of Graubünden. It lies on the range west of the Val Medel.
