= Pizzo del Torto =

Mountain of the Lepontine Alps

- Location within Alps

Highest point
- Elevation: 2,723 m (8,934 ft)
- Prominence: 88 m (289 ft)
- Parent peak: Piz Corbet
- Coordinates: 46°21′21″N 9°17′46″E

Geography
- Location: Lombardy, Italy/Graubünden, Switzerland
- Parent range: Lepontine Alps

Pizzo del Torto is a mountain of the Lepontine Alps, located on the Swiss-Italian border, between Soazza and San Bernardo ai Monti (San Giacomo Filippo).
