= Kastelhorn =

Mountain in Switzerland

- Punta del Castel
- Lake Boden with Kastelhorn in the background

Highest point
- Elevation: 3,128 m (10,262 ft)
- Prominence: 32 m (105 ft)
- Parent peak: Basòdino
- Coordinates: 46°25′21″N 8°27′28″E

Geography
- Location within Switzerland
- Location: Ticino, Switzerland; Piedmont, Italy
- Parent range: Lepontine Alps

The Kastelhorn (also known as Punta del Castel) is a mountain of the Lepontine Alps, located on the border between Switzerland and Italy. It lies north of the Basòdino.
