= Cima di Gana Bianca =

Mountain in Switzerland

- Location within Switzerland

Highest point
- Elevation: 2,842 m (9,324 ft)
- Prominence: 410 m (1,350 ft)
- Parent peak: Rheinwaldhorn
- Coordinates: 46°28′17″N 8°59′32.6″E

Geography
- Location: Ticino, Switzerland
- Parent range: Lepontine Alps

The Cima di Gana Bianca is a mountain of the Swiss Lepontine Alps, overlooking Acquarossa in the canton of Ticino. It lies west of the Rheinwaldhorn, between the main Blenio valley and the Val Malvaglia.
