= I Rodond =

Mountain in Switzerland

- Location within Switzerland

Highest point
- Elevation: 2,830 m (9,280 ft)
- Prominence: 197 m (646 ft)
- Parent peak: Rheinwaldhorn
- Coordinates: 46°26′50.7″N 9°08′09.6″E

Geography
- Location: Graubünden, Switzerland
- Parent range: Lepontine Alps

I Rodond is a mountain of the Swiss Lepontine Alps, located west of San Bernardino in the canton of Graubünden. It lies north of the Pass di Passit, on the mountain range that separates Val Calanca from Val Mesolcina.
