= Lorenzhorn =

Mountain in Switzerland

- Location within Switzerland

Highest point
- Elevation: 3,048 m (10,000 ft)
- Prominence: 179 m (587 ft)
- Parent peak: Fanellhorn
- Coordinates: 46°31′32.7″N 9°7′31.8″E

Geography
- Location: Graubünden, Switzerland
- Parent range: Lepontine Alps

The Lorenzhorn is a mountain of the Lepontine Alps, located west of Hinterrhein in the canton of Graubünden. It lies on the range between the valleys of Vals and Hinterrhein. On its north side lies a glacier named Fanellgletscher.
