= Poncione di Valleggia =

Mountain in Switzerland

- Location within Switzerland

Highest point
- Elevation: 2,873 m (9,426 ft)
- Prominence: 245 m (804 ft)
- Parent peak: Basòdino
- Coordinates: 46°27′54.2″N 8°29′57.3″E

Geography
- Location: Ticino, Switzerland
- Parent range: Lepontine Alps

The Poncione di Valleggia is a mountain of the Lepontine Alps, overlooking Bedretto, in the Swiss canton of Ticino.
