= Piz Vizan =

Mountain in Switzerland

- Location within Switzerland

Highest point
- Elevation: 2,471 m (8,107 ft)
- Prominence: 79 m (259 ft)
- Coordinates: 46°36′06.1″N 9°22′56.4″E

Geography
- Location: Graubünden, Switzerland
- Parent range: Lepontine Alps

Piz Vizan is a mountain of the Swiss Lepontine Alps, overlooking Andeer in the canton of Graubünden. It lies at the eastern end of the range east of Pizzas d'Anarosa.
