= Pizzo Solögna =

Mountain in Switzerland

- Location within Switzerland

Highest point
- Elevation: 2,698 m (8,852 ft)
- Prominence: 251 m (823 ft)
- Parent peak: Basòdino
- Coordinates: 46°22′45″N 8°29′47″E

Geography
- Location: Ticino, Switzerland
- Parent range: Lepontine Alps

Pizzo Solögna is a mountain of the Lepontine Alps, overlooking the Val Bavona in the Swiss canton of Ticino. It is located south of the Basòdino.
