= Poncione Pro do Rodùc =

Mountain in Switzerland

- Location within Switzerland

Highest point
- Elevation: 2,522 m (8,274 ft)
- Prominence: 69 m (226 ft)
- Parent peak: Pizzo del Sole
- Coordinates: 46°31′54.1″N 8°43′45.6″E

Geography
- Location: Ticino, Switzerland
- Parent range: Lepontine Alps

The Poncione Pro do Rodùc is a mountain of the Swiss Lepontine Alps, overlooking the lake of Ritom in the canton of Ticino.
