= Piz d'Arbeola =

Mountain in Switzerland

- Location within Switzerland

Highest point
- Elevation: 2,600 m (8,500 ft)
- Prominence: 200 m (660 ft)
- Parent peak: Piz Pian Grand
- Coordinates: 46°25′40″N 9°09′53″E

Geography
- Location: Graubünden, Switzerland
- Parent range: Lepontine Alps

Piz d'Arbeola (2,600 m) is a mountain of the Lepontine Alps, south of San Bernardino in the canton of Graubünden. It lies between the Val Calanca and the Val Mesolcina, north of Piz Pian Grand.
