= Poncione del Vènn =

Mountain in Switzerland

- Poncione del Vanno
- Location within Switzerland

Highest point
- Elevation: 2,477 m (8,127 ft)
- Prominence: 270 m (890 ft)
- Parent peak: Cima di Bri
- Coordinates: 46°16′27″N 8°54′26″E

Geography
- Location: Ticino, Switzerland
- Parent range: Lepontine Alps

Poncione del Vènn (or Poncione del Vanno) is a mountain of the Swiss Lepontine Alps, overlooking Lavertezzo in the canton of Ticino. It is located between the valleys of Verzasca and Leventina.
