= Pizzo di Madéi =

Mountain of the Lepontine Alps

- Pizzo Medaro
- Location within Alps

Highest point
- Elevation: 2,551 m (8,369 ft)
- Prominence: 170 m (560 ft)
- Coordinates: 46°13′59″N 8°28′07″E

Geography
- Location: Ticino, Switzerland; Piedmont, Italy
- Parent range: Lepontine Alps

Pizzo di Madéi (also known as Pizzo Medaro) is a mountain of the Lepontine Alps, located on the border between Switzerland and Italy. It lies between the valleys of Vergeletto (Ticino), Isorno and Onsernone (Piedmont).
