= Piz Denter =

Mountain in Switzerland

- Location within Switzerland

Highest point
- Elevation: 2,956 m (9,698 ft)
- Prominence: 67 m (220 ft)
- Parent peak: Piz Blas
- Coordinates: 46°34′26″N 8°43′23″E

Geography
- Location: Graubünden/Ticino, Switzerland
- Parent range: Lepontine Alps

Piz Denter is a mountain of the Lepontine Alps, located on the border between the Swiss cantons of Graubünden and Ticino. On its northern side (Graubünden), it overlooks the valleys of Lake Curnera and Lake Nalps, both drained by tributaries of the Rhine.
