= Fil de Dragiva =

Mountain in Switzerland

- Location within Switzerland

Highest point
- Elevation: 2,786 m (9,140 ft)
- Prominence: 198 m (650 ft)
- Parent peak: Cima de Gagela
- Coordinates: 46°22′24.1″N 9°10′18.1″E

Geography
- Location: Graubünden, Switzerland
- Parent range: Lepontine Alps

Fil de Dragiva is a mountain of the Lepontine Alps, located between Rossa and Soazza, in the Swiss canton of Graubünden.
