= Pizzo di Röd =

Mountain of the Lepontine Alps

- Location within Switzerland

Highest point
- Elevation: 2,699 m (8,855 ft)
- Prominence: 279 m (915 ft)
- Parent peak: Basòdino
- Coordinates: 46°27′8.7″N 8°36′48.7″E

Geography
- Location: Ticino, Switzerland
- Parent range: Lepontine Alps

Pizzo di Röd is a mountain of the Lepontine Alps, overlooking Fusio in the canton of Ticino. It is located on the chain separating the Valle di Peccia from the Val Lavizzara.
