= Chilchalphorn =

Mountain in Switzerland

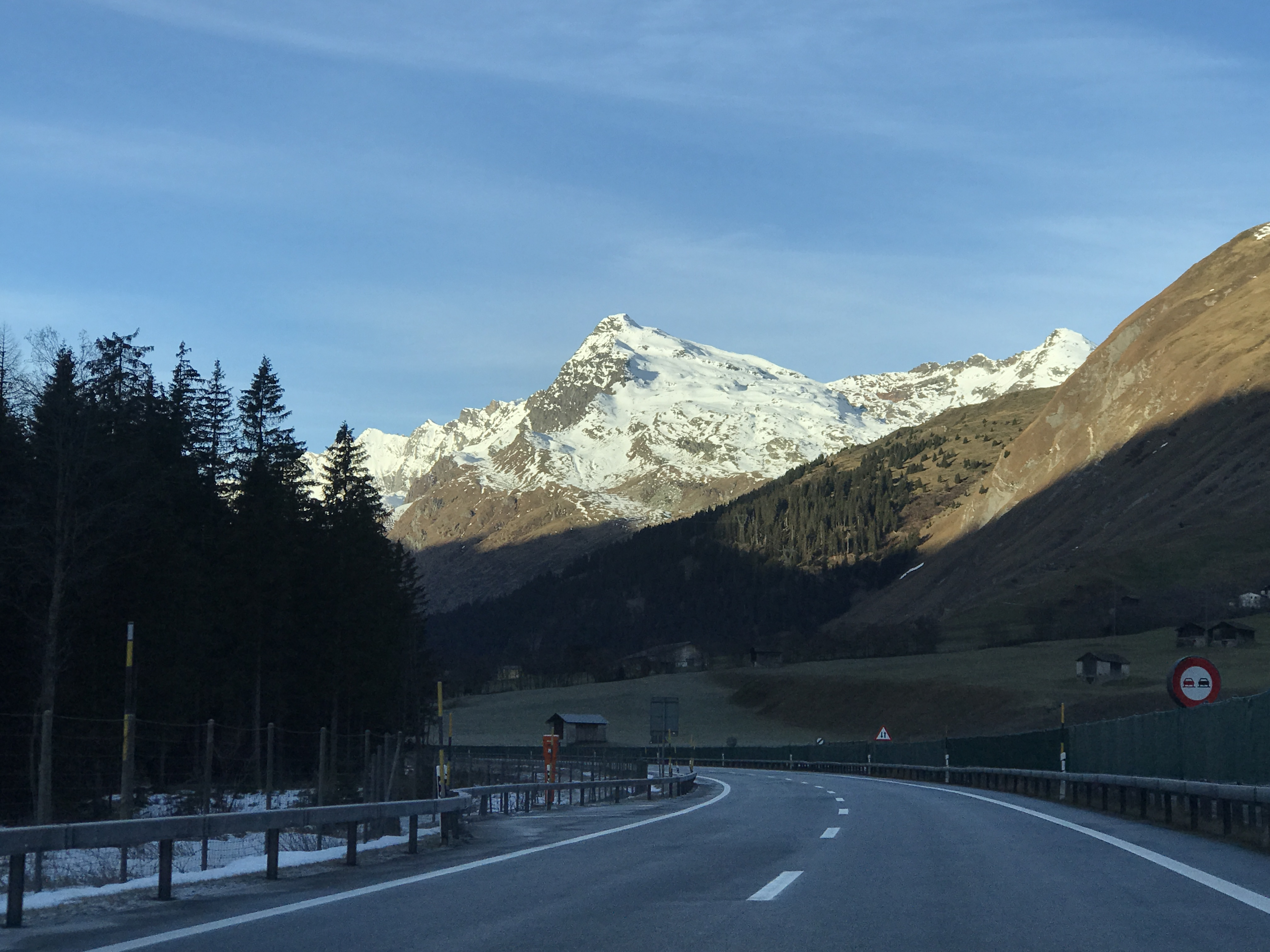
- Chilchalphorn seen from Nufenen

Highest point
- Elevation: 3,040 m (9,970 ft)
- Prominence: 192 m (630 ft)
- Parent peak: Fanellhorn
- Coordinates: 46°31′59.3″N 9°9′15″E

Geography
- Location within Switzerland
- Location: Graubünden, Switzerland
- Parent range: Lepontine Alps

The Chilchalphorn is a mountain of the Lepontine Alps, overlooking Hinterrhein in the canton of Graubünden. On the northern side of the mountain lies a glacier named Fanellgletscher.
