= Piz Titschal =

Mountain in Switzerland

- Location within Switzerland

Highest point
- Elevation: 2,550 m (8,370 ft)
- Prominence: 16 m (52 ft)
- Coordinates: 46°42′29.5″N 9°01′49.3″E

Geography
- Location: Graubünden, Switzerland
- Parent range: Lepontine Alps

Piz Titschal is a mountain of the Swiss Lepontine Alps, located south of Obersaxen in the canton of Graubünden.
