= Piz Radun =

Mountain in Switzerland

- Plangghorn
- Location within Switzerland

Highest point
- Elevation: 2,581 m (8,468 ft)
- Prominence: 111 m (364 ft)
- Parent peak: Piz Fess
- Coordinates: 46°41′30.4″N 9°16′39.5″E

Geography
- Location: Graubünden, Switzerland
- Parent range: Lepontine Alps

Piz Radun (also known as Plangghorn) is a mountain of the Swiss Lepontine Alps, overlooking Safien in the canton of Graubünden.
