= Muttenhorn =

Mountain in Switzerland

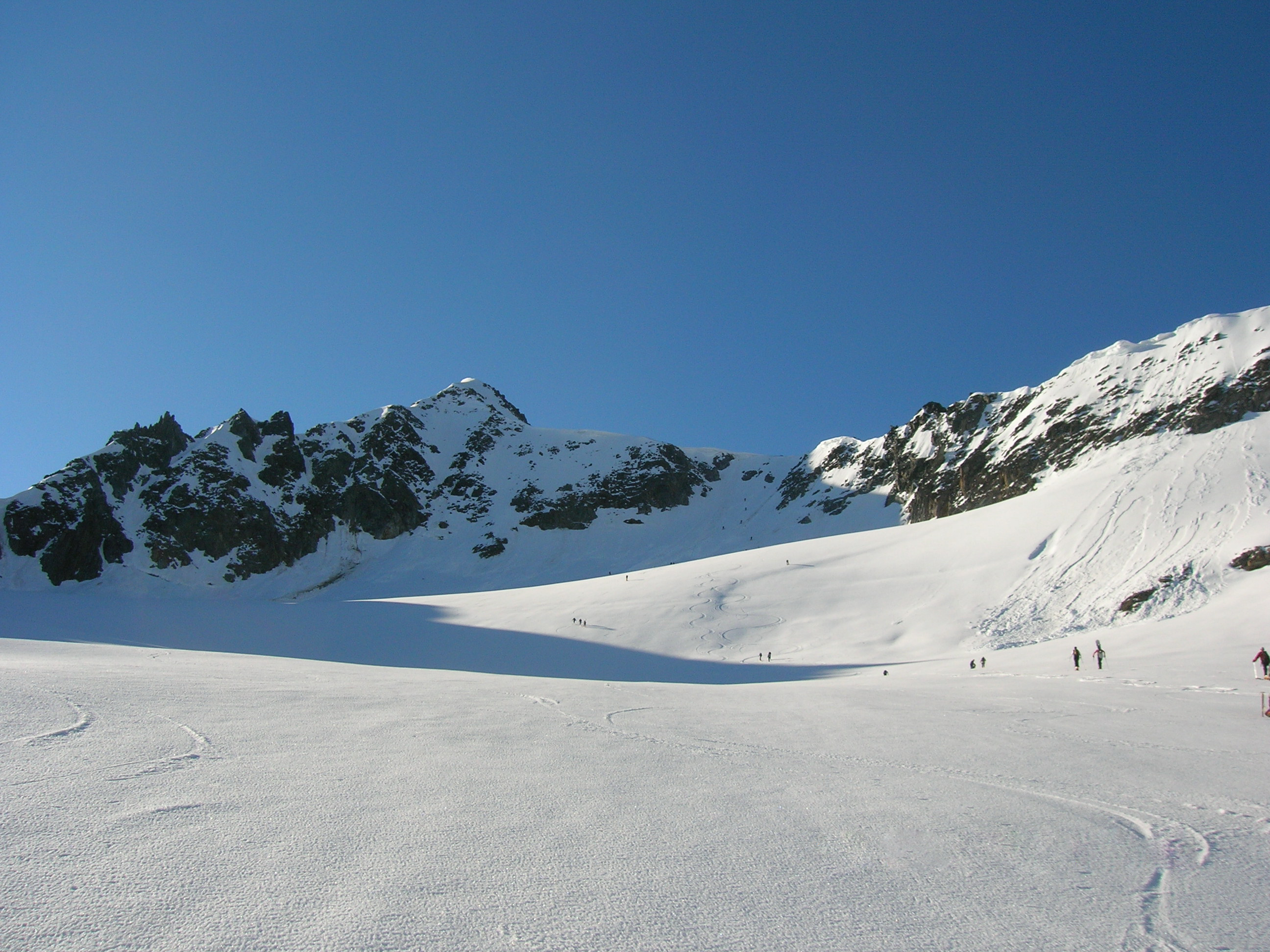
- The Mutthorn seen from the north-west side

Highest point
- Elevation: 3,099 m (10,167 ft)
- Prominence: 292 m (958 ft)
- Parent peak: Pizzo Rotondo
- Coordinates: 46°32′47.5″N 8°25′38″E

Geography
- Location within Switzerland
- Location: Valais/Uri, Switzerland
- Parent range: Lepontine Alps

The Muttenhorn is a mountain in the Lepontine Alps, located on the border between the cantons of Valais and Uri. At 3,099 metres above sea level, it overlooks the south side of Furka Pass. A glacier named Muttgletscher lies over its north-western flanks, above 2,600 metres.

The summit is also distinguished by the name Gross Muttenhorn, with other lower summits being named Chli Muttenhorn (3,024 metres) and Stotzig Muttenhorn (3,062 metres). The whole range is referred to as the Muttenhörner.
