= Marmontana =

Mountain in Switzerland

- Location within Alps

Highest point
- Elevation: 2,316 m (7,598 ft)
- Prominence: 343 m (1,125 ft)
- Coordinates: 46°10′18.8″N 09°10′13.1″E

Geography
- Location: Lombardy, Italy/Graubünden, Switzerland
- Parent range: Lepontine Alps

The Marmontana is a mountain of the Lepontine Alps, located on the Swiss-Italian border.

The nearest respective human settlements are Brenzeglio in the Italian south, approximately 4500 horizontal meters from the summit, and Roveredo in the Swiss north, approximately 7750 horizontal metres from the summit. Other nearby locations include Dongo and Bellinzona. The mountain is in close proximity to 'Lago di Como' or "Lake Como".

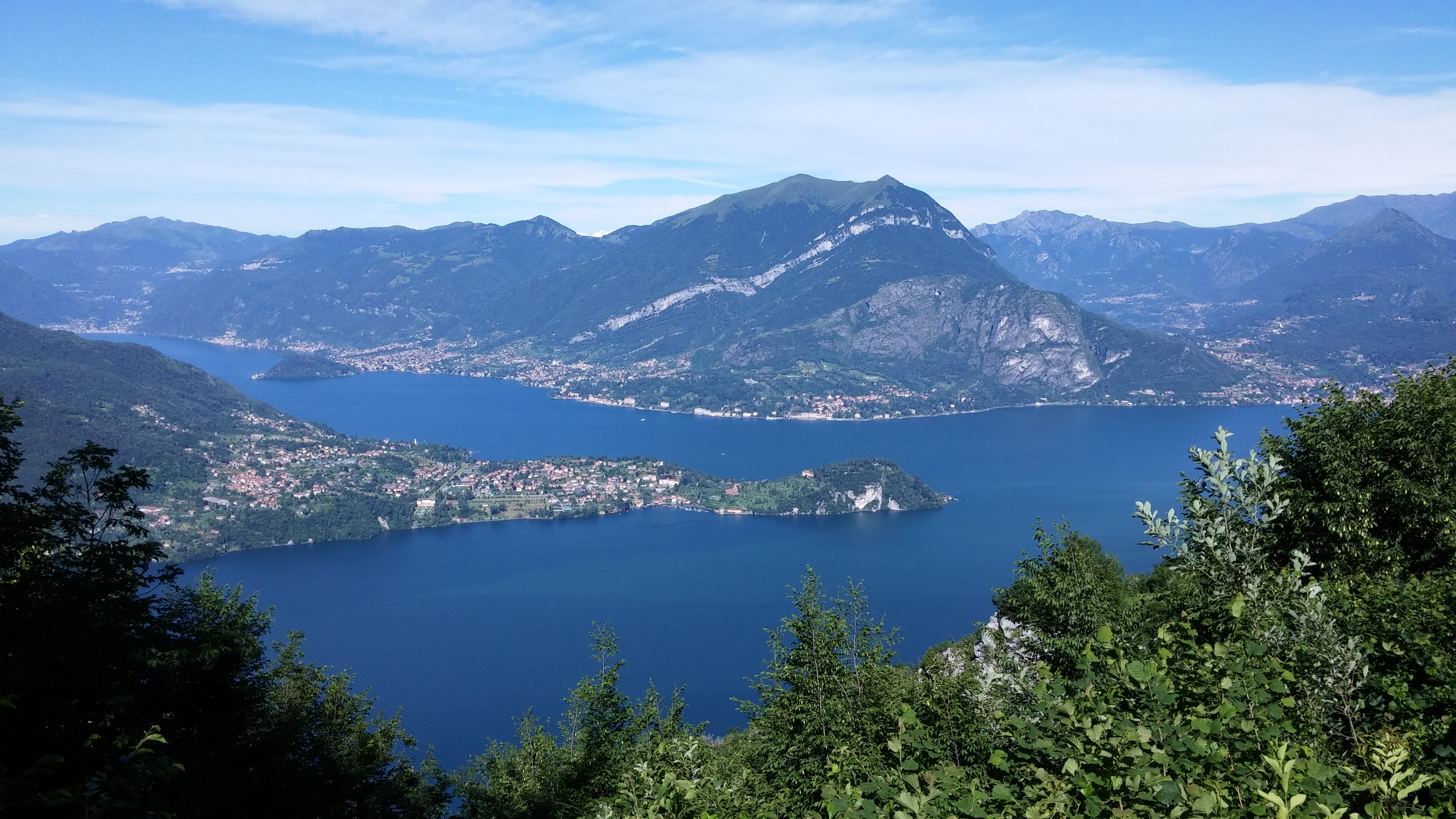
Lake Como
