= Pizzo Paglia =

Mountain in Switzerland

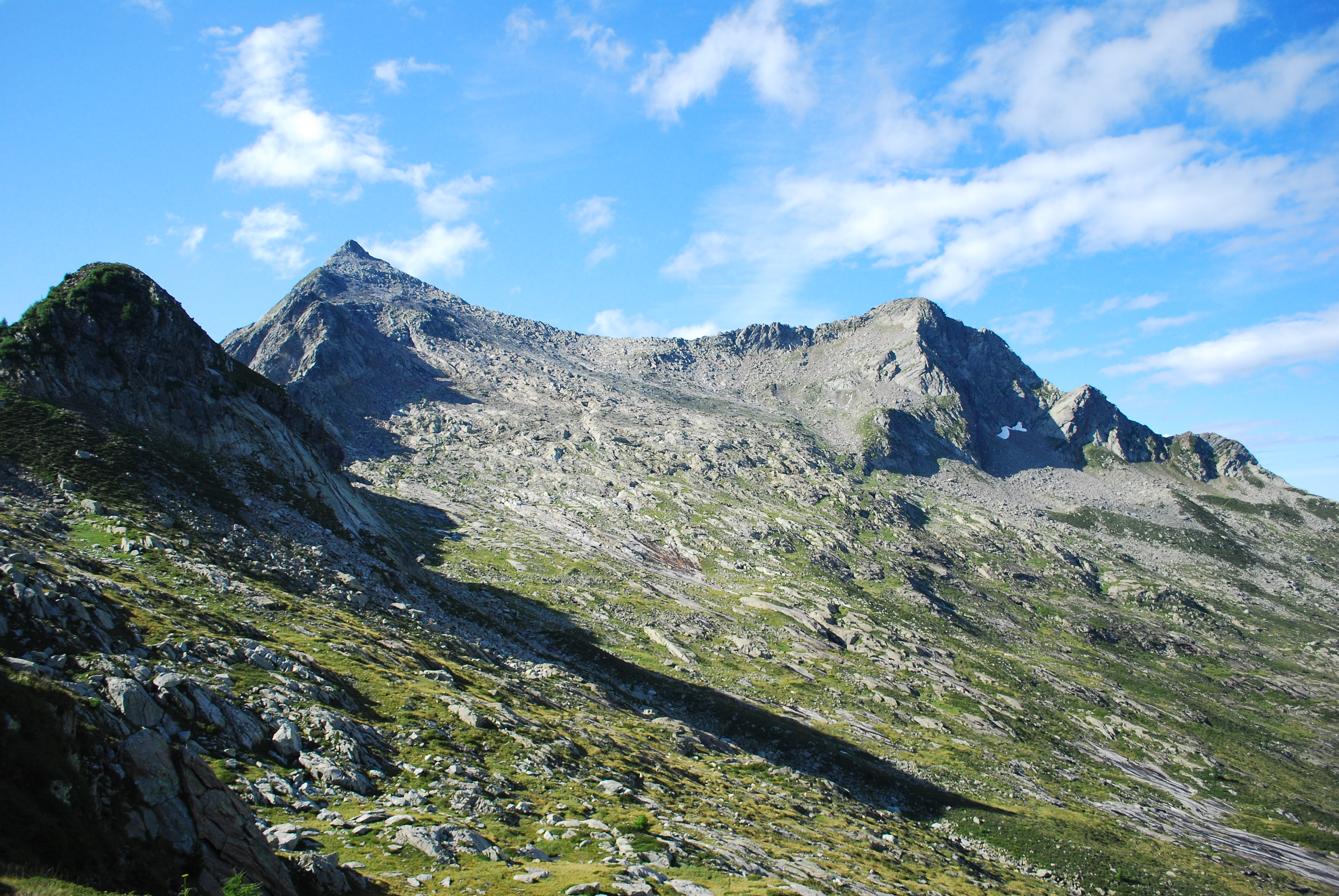

Highest point
- Elevation: 2,593 m (8,507 ft)
- Prominence: 498 m (1,634 ft)
- Isolation: 10.3 km (6.4 mi)
- Coordinates: 46°13′55″N 09°13′09″E

Geography
- Location within Switzerland
- Location: Graubünden, Switzerland (mountain partially in Italy)
- Parent range: Lepontine Alps

Pizzo Paglia is a mountain of the Lepontine Alps, overlooking the Val Cama in the canton of Graubünden. The border with Italy runs 300 metres south of the summit.

== See also ==
- List of mountains of Graubünden
- List of most isolated mountains of Switzerland
