= Madone (Locarno) =

Mountain in Switzerland

- Location within Switzerland

Highest point
- Elevation: 2,051 m (6,729 ft)
- Prominence: 143 m (469 ft)
- Coordinates: 46°13′26.5″N 8°47′57.3″E

Geography
- Location: Ticino, Switzerland
- Parent range: Lepontine Alps

The Madone is a mountain of the Swiss Lepontine Alps, located between the valleys of Maggia and Verzasca in the canton of Ticino.
