= Monte Berlinghera =

Mountain in Italy

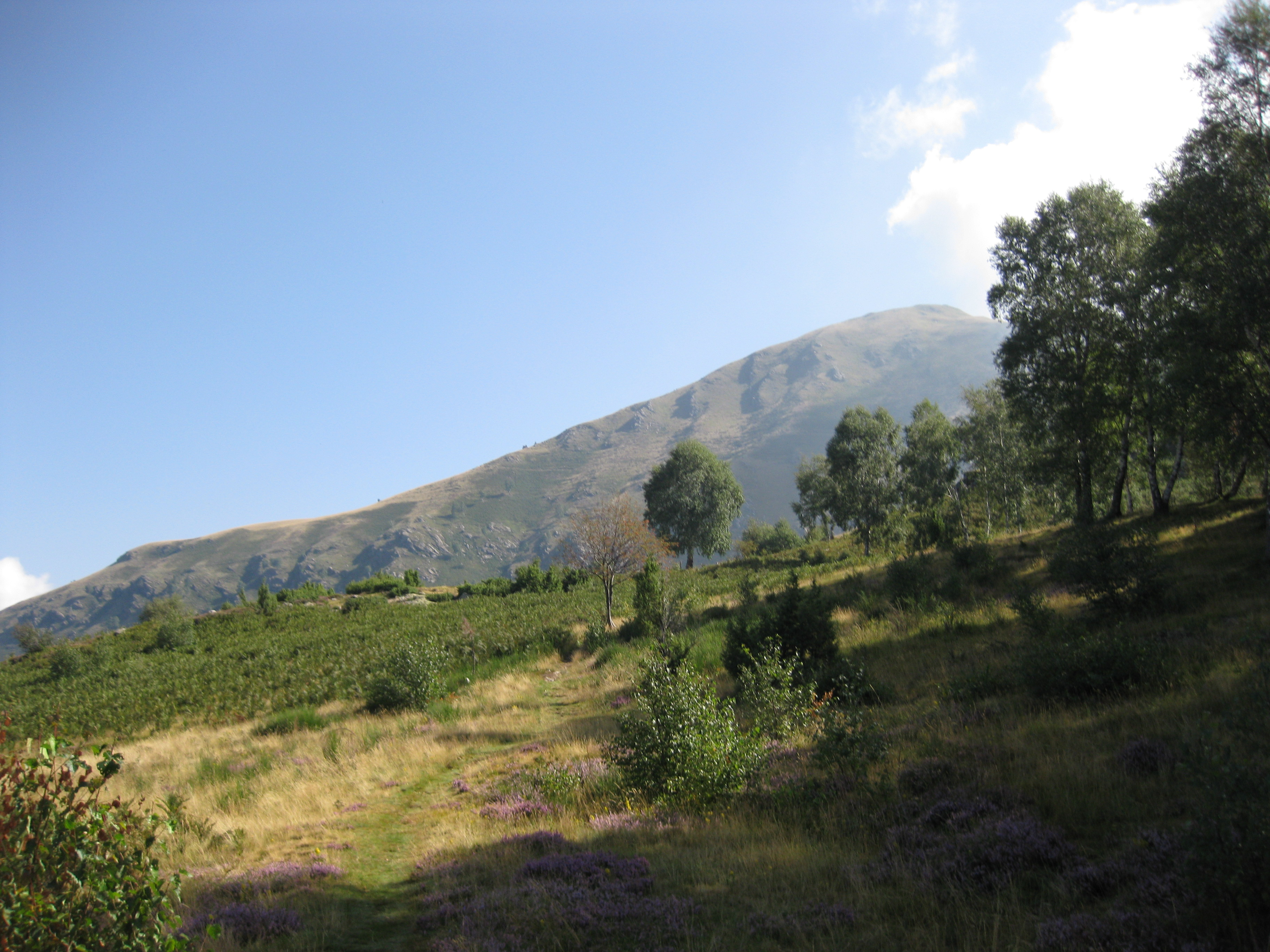
- Monte Berlinghera, view from the path between San Bartolomeo and Bocchetta Chiaro.

Highest point
- Elevation: 1,930 m (6,330 ft)
- Prominence: 264 m (866 ft)
- Coordinates: 46°12′39″N 9°23′23″E

Geography
- Location within Italy
- Location: Lombardy, Italy

Monte Berlinghera is a mountain of Lombardy, Italy. It has an elevation of 1,930 metres (6,332 ft) and is located near the Lake Como close to Gera Lario.
