= Piz Tomül =

Mountain in Switzerland

- Wissensteinhorn
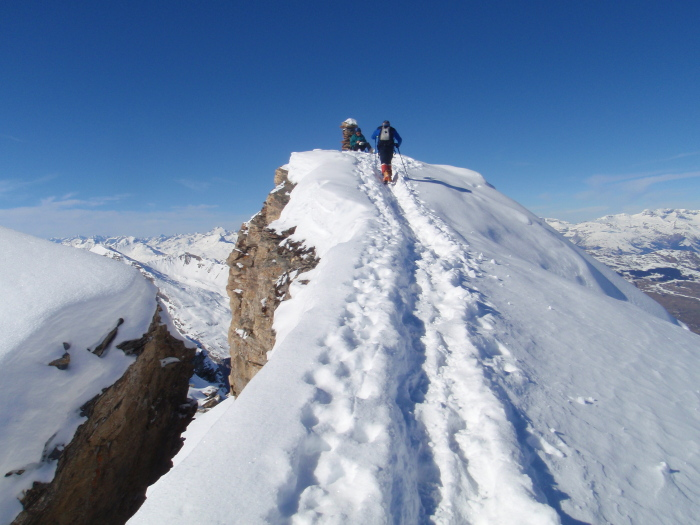
- On the summit

Highest point
- Elevation: 2,946 m (9,665 ft)
- Prominence: 534 m (1,752 ft)
- Parent peak: Rheinwaldhorn
- Coordinates: 46°37′24.2″N 9°13′42.4″E

Geography
- Location within Switzerland
- Location: Graubünden, Switzerland
- Parent range: Lepontine Alps

Piz Tomül (also known as Wissensteinhorn) is a mountain of the Lepontine Alps, overlooking Vals in the canton of Graubünden. With an altitude of 2,946 metres above sea level, it is the highest summit of the range lying north of Tomülpass.
