= Pizzo di Porcaresc =

Mountain of the Lepontine Alps

- Pizzo Porcareccio
- Location within Alps

Highest point
- Elevation: 2,467 m (8,094 ft)
- Prominence: 71 m (233 ft)
- Coordinates: 46°14′40″N 8°27′51″E

Geography
- Location: Ticino, Switzerland; Piedmont, Italy
- Parent range: Lepontine Alps

Pizzo di Porcaresc (also known as Pizzo di Porcareccio) is a mountain of the Lepontine Alps, located on the border between Switzerland and Italy. Its summit is the tripoint between the Valle dell'Isorno (in the Italian region of Piedmont), the Valle di Campo and the Valle di Vergeletto (both in the Swiss canton of Ticino).
