= Pizzo Malora =

Mountain in Switzerland

- Location within Switzerland

Highest point
- Elevation: 2,640 m (8,660 ft)
- Prominence: 248 m (814 ft)
- Parent peak: Basòdino
- Coordinates: 46°23′1.8″N 8°35′17.1″E

Geography
- Location: Ticino, Switzerland
- Parent range: Lepontine Alps

Pizzo Malora is a mountain of the Lepontine Alps, located in the Swiss canton of Ticino. It lies approximately 5 km (3 mi) south of Pizzo Castello.
