= Lepontine Alps =

Mountain range in southern Switzerland and northern Italy

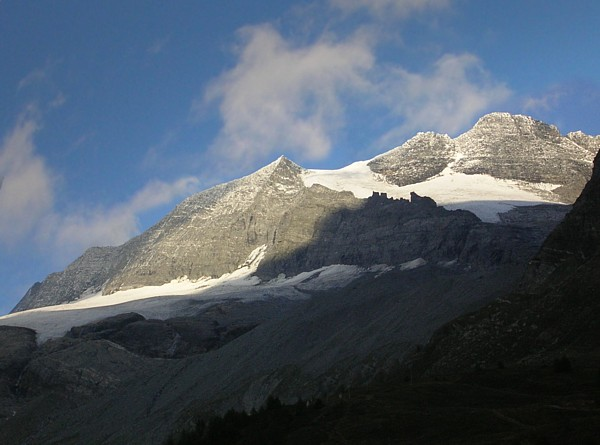
- Monte Leone

Highest point
- Peak: Monte Leone
- Elevation: 3,553 m (11,657 ft)
- Listing: Prominent mountains of the Alps
- Coordinates: 46°14′59″N 8°06′37″E

Naming
- Native name: German: Lepontinische Alpen; Italian: Alpi Lepontine

Geography
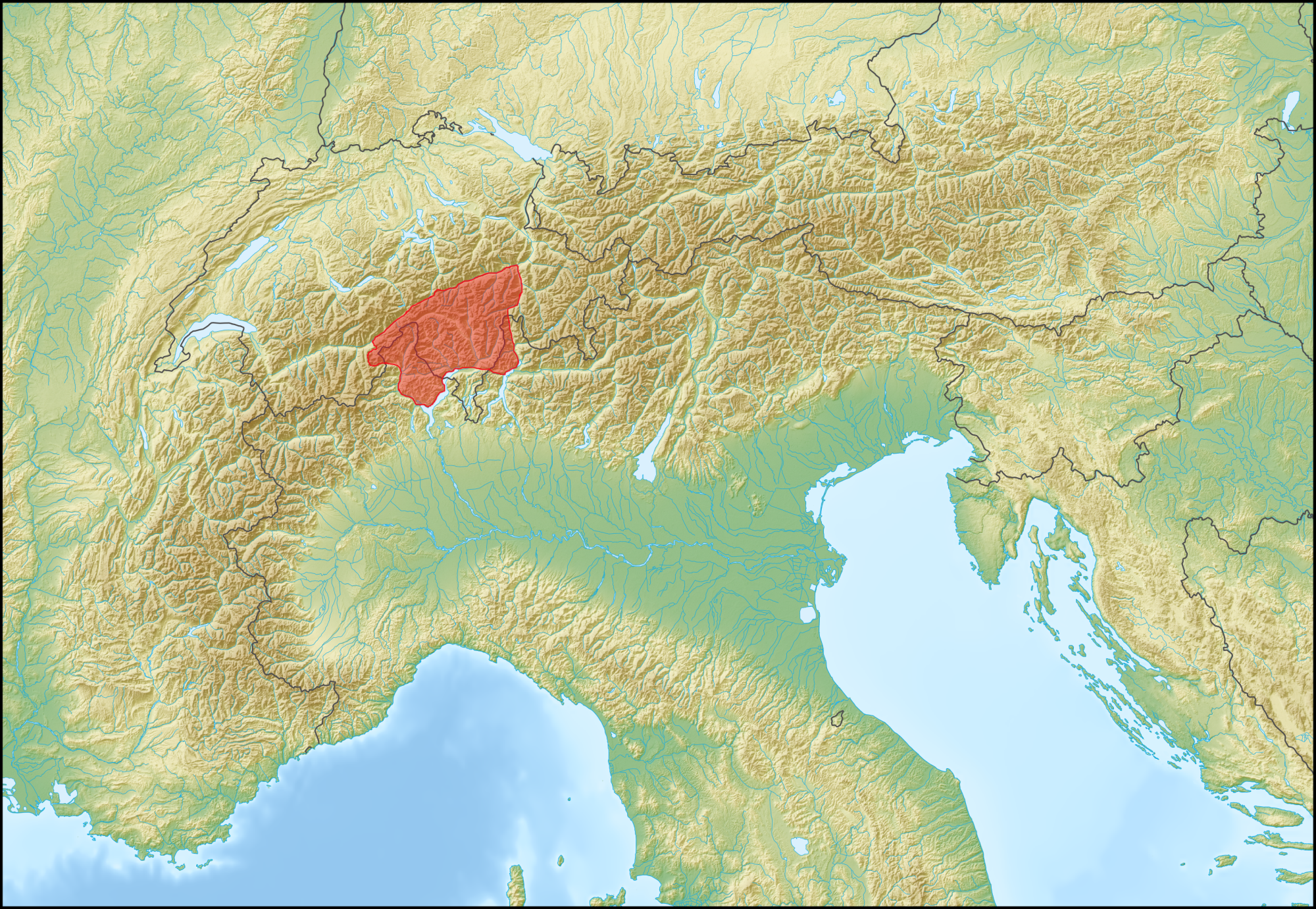
- Lepontine Alps (red)
- Countries: Switzerland; Italy
- Cantons, Regions: Valais; Ticino; Graubünden; Uri; Piedmont; Lombardy
- Range coordinates: 46°25′N 8°40′E
- Parent range: Western Alps
- Borders on: Pennine Alps; Bernese Alps; Uri Alps; Glarus Alps; Western Rhaetian Alps; Lugano Prealps
- Topo map: Swiss Federal Office of Topography swisstopo

Geology
- Orogeny: Alpine orogeny

The Lepontine Alps (German: Lepontinische Alpen, French: Alpes lépontines, Italian: Alpi Lepontine) are a mountain range in the north-western part of the Alps. They are located in Switzerland (Valais, Ticino, Uri and Graubünden) and Italy (Piedmont and Lombardy).

The Simplon rail tunnel (from Brig to Domodossola), the Gotthard rail (from Erstfeld to Bodio) and Gotthard road tunnels (from Andermatt to Airolo) and the San Bernardino road tunnel are important transport arteries.

The eastern portion of the Lepontine Alps, from the St Gotthard Pass to the Splügen Pass, is named the Adula Alps, while the western part is historically referred to as the Ticino Alps.

== Etymology ==
The designation Lepontine Alps, derived from the Latin name of the Valle Leventina, has long been somewhat vaguely applied to the Alpine ranges that enclose it, before being used for the whole range.

== Geography ==
Following the line marking the division of the waters that flow into the Po from those that feed the Rhone or the Rhine, the main ridge of the Lepontine Alps describes a somewhat irregular curve, convex to the north, from the Simplon Pass to the Splügen Pass. With the single exception of the Monte Leone, overlooking the Simplon Pass, the summits of this portion of the chain are much inferior in height to those of the neighbouring chains; but two peaks of the Adula group, culminating at the Rheinwaldhorn, exceed 11,000 feet (3,400 m) in height.

The extensive region lying south of the main ridge is occupied by mountain ranges whose summits sometimes rival in height those of the dividing ridge, and which are cut through by deep valleys, three of which converge in the basins of Lake Maggiore and Lake Como, the deepest of all the lakes on the south side of the Alps. The most important of these valleys is the Valle Leventina, or the upper valley of the Ticino. This has been known from a remote antiquity because it leads to the St Gotthard Pass, one of the easiest lines of communication between northern and southern Europe.

The Lepontine Alps are drained by the rivers Rhône in the west, Reuss in the north, Rhine (Anterior and Posterior Rhine) in the east and Ticino and Toce in the south.

== List of peaks ==
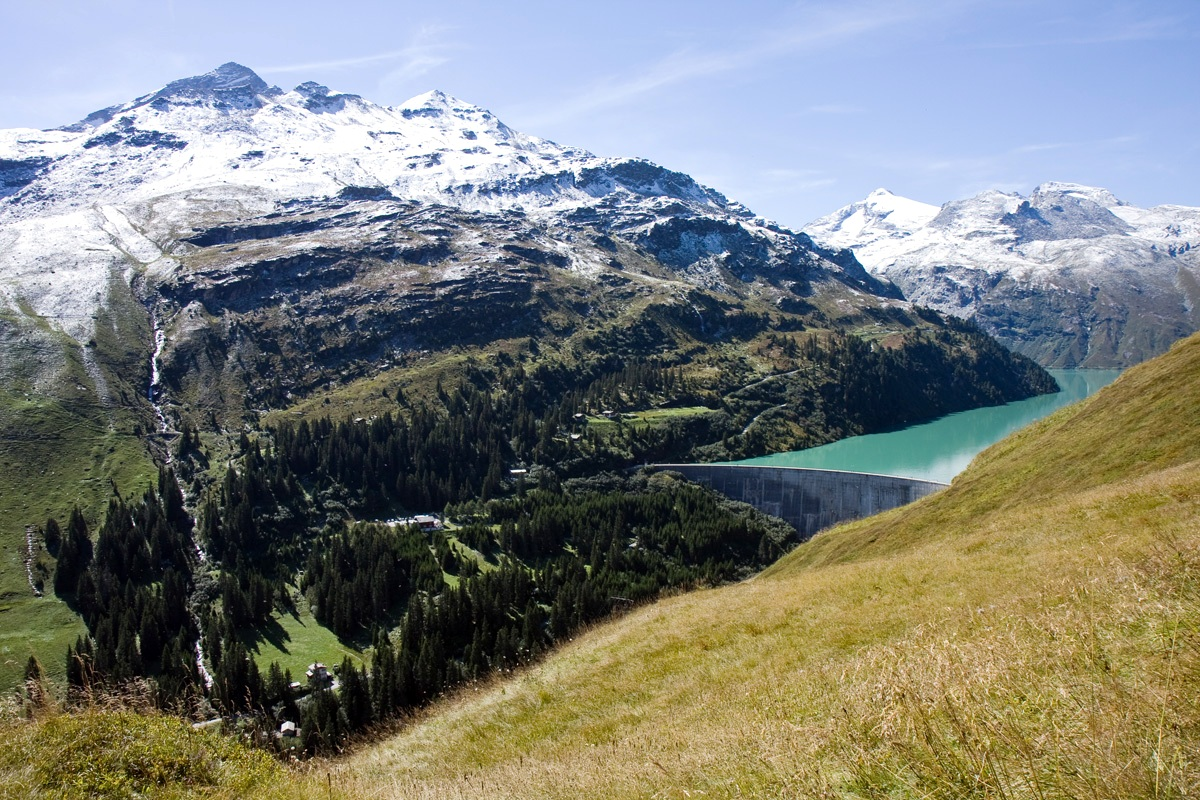
Zervreilasee

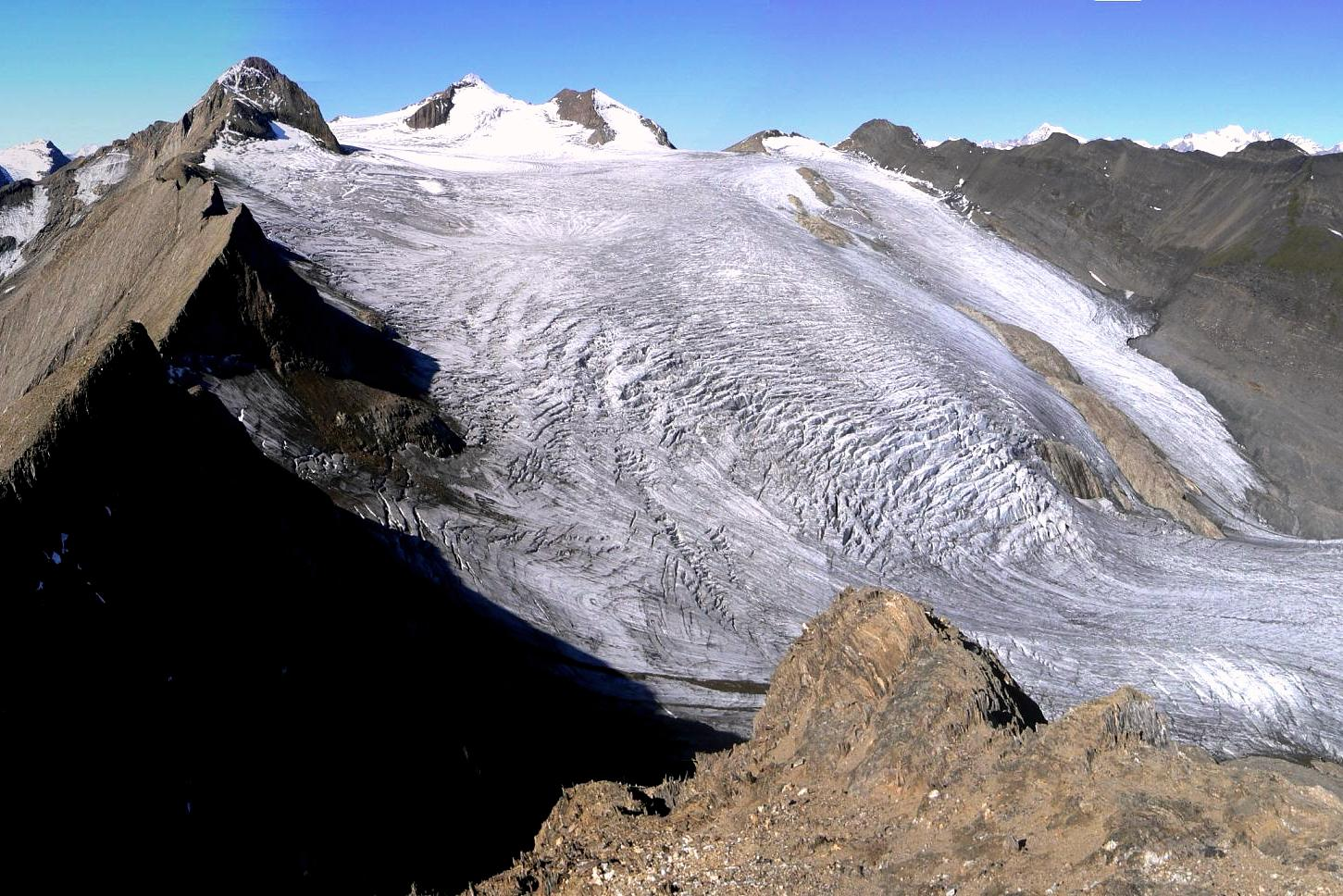
Blinnenhorn

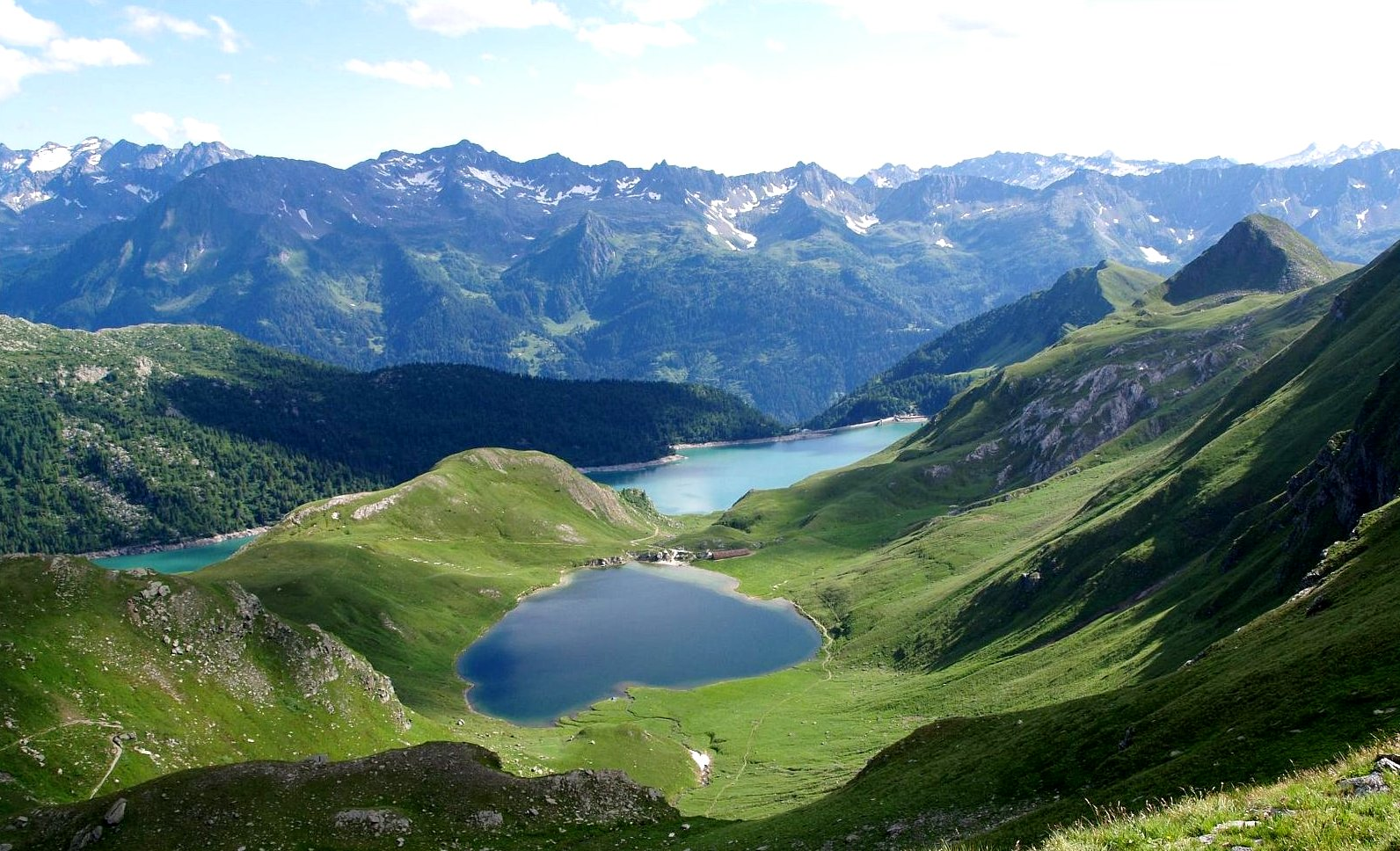
Lago Ritom

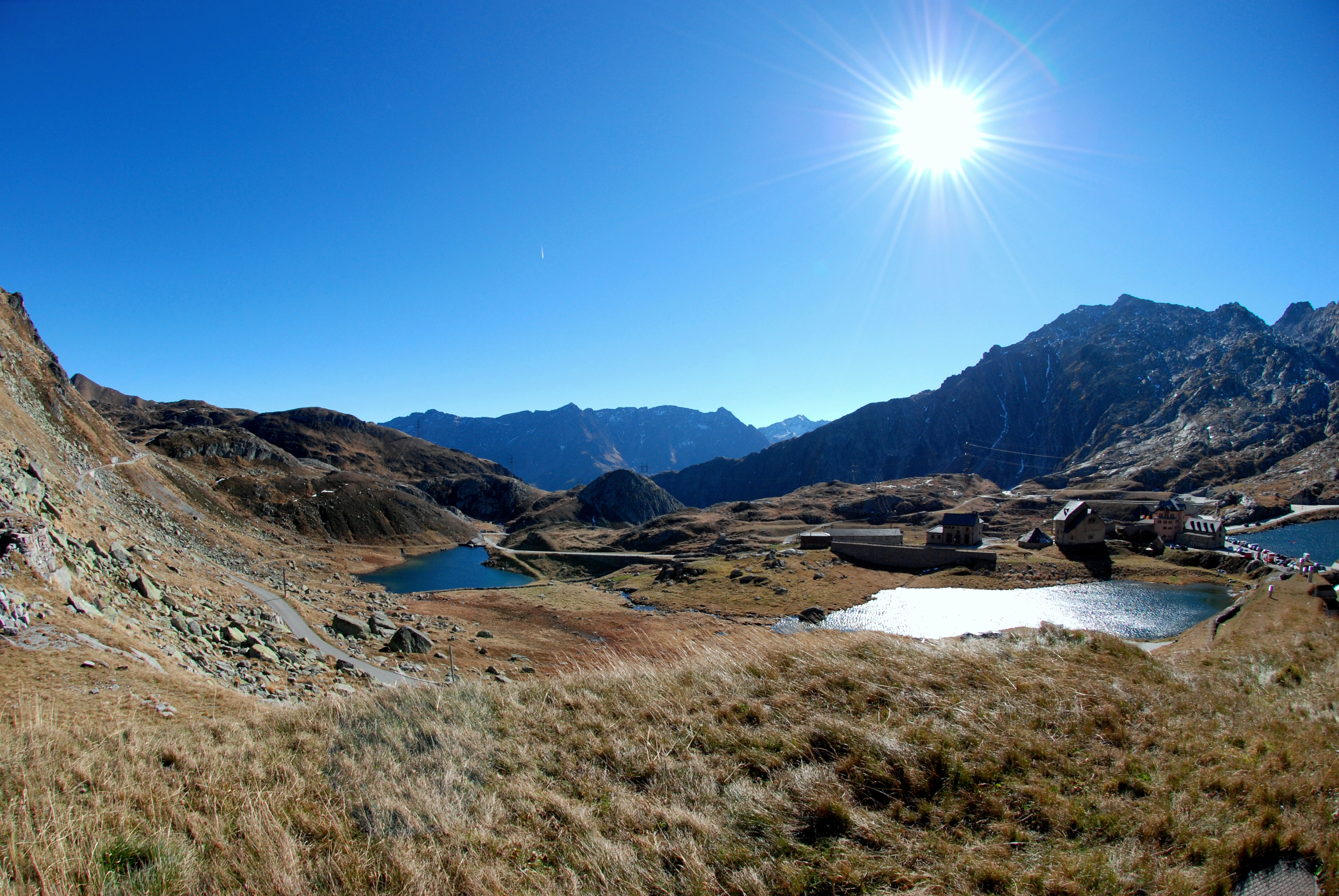
St Gotthard Pass

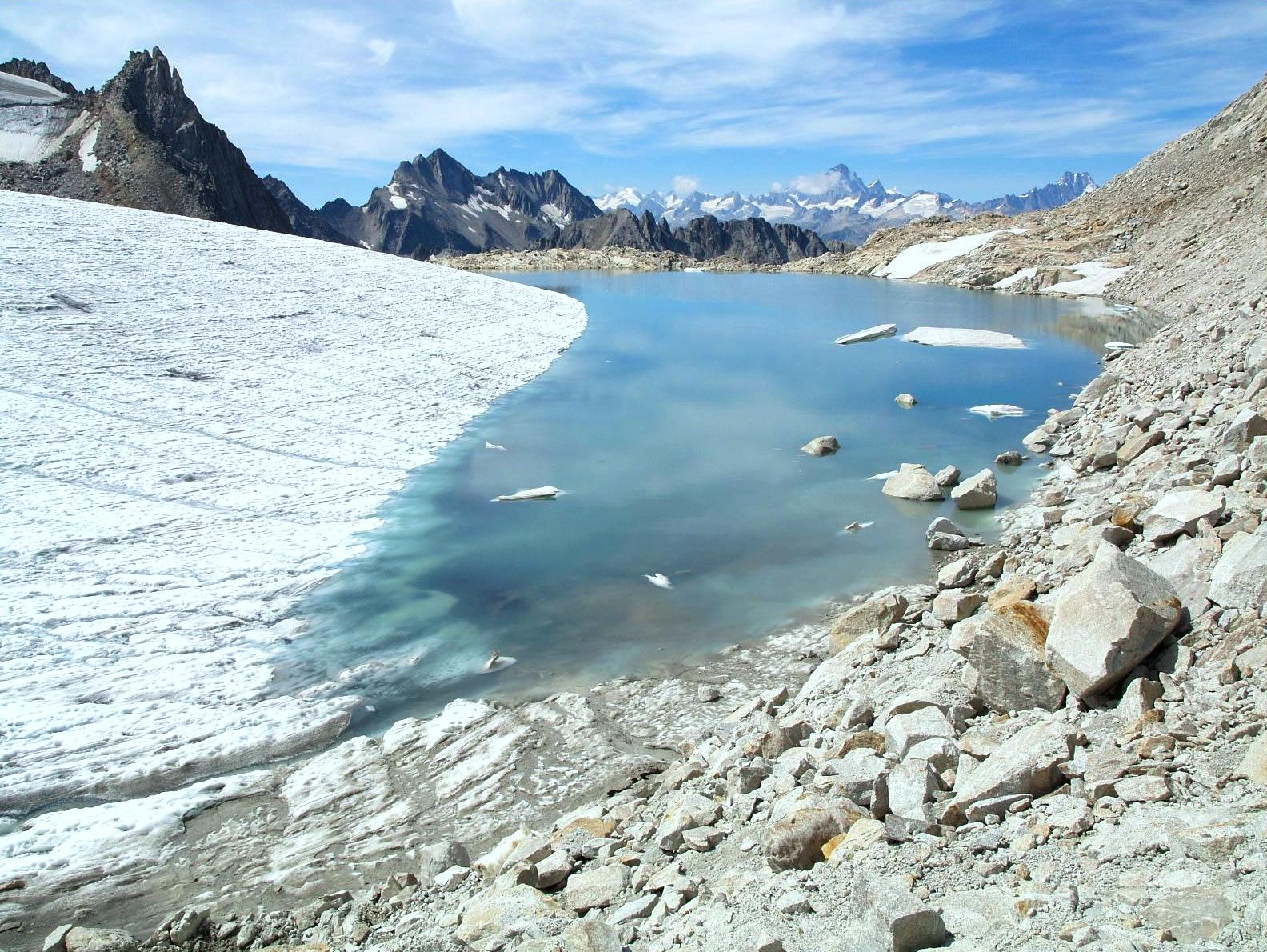
Gerenpass

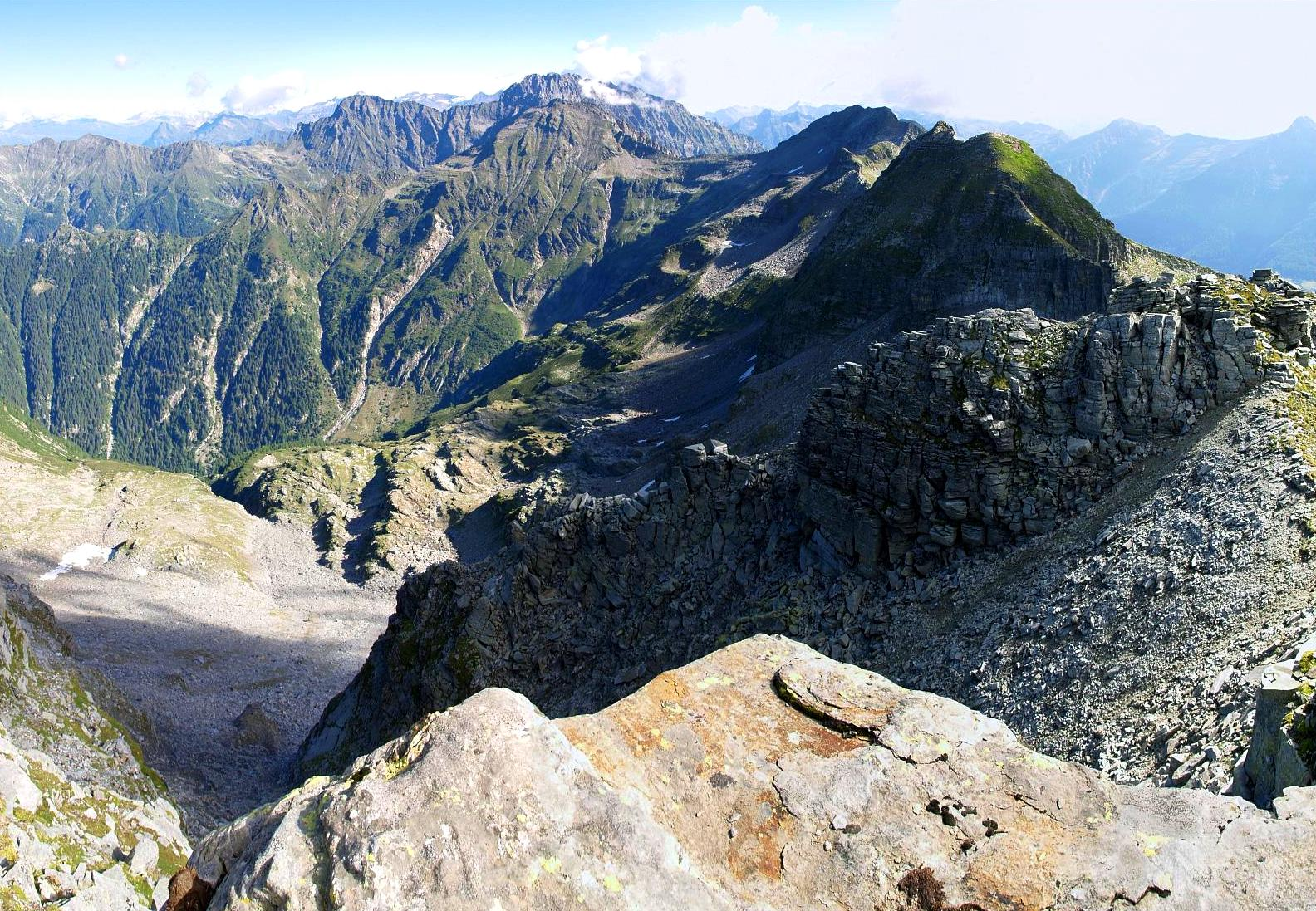
Pizzo di Claro

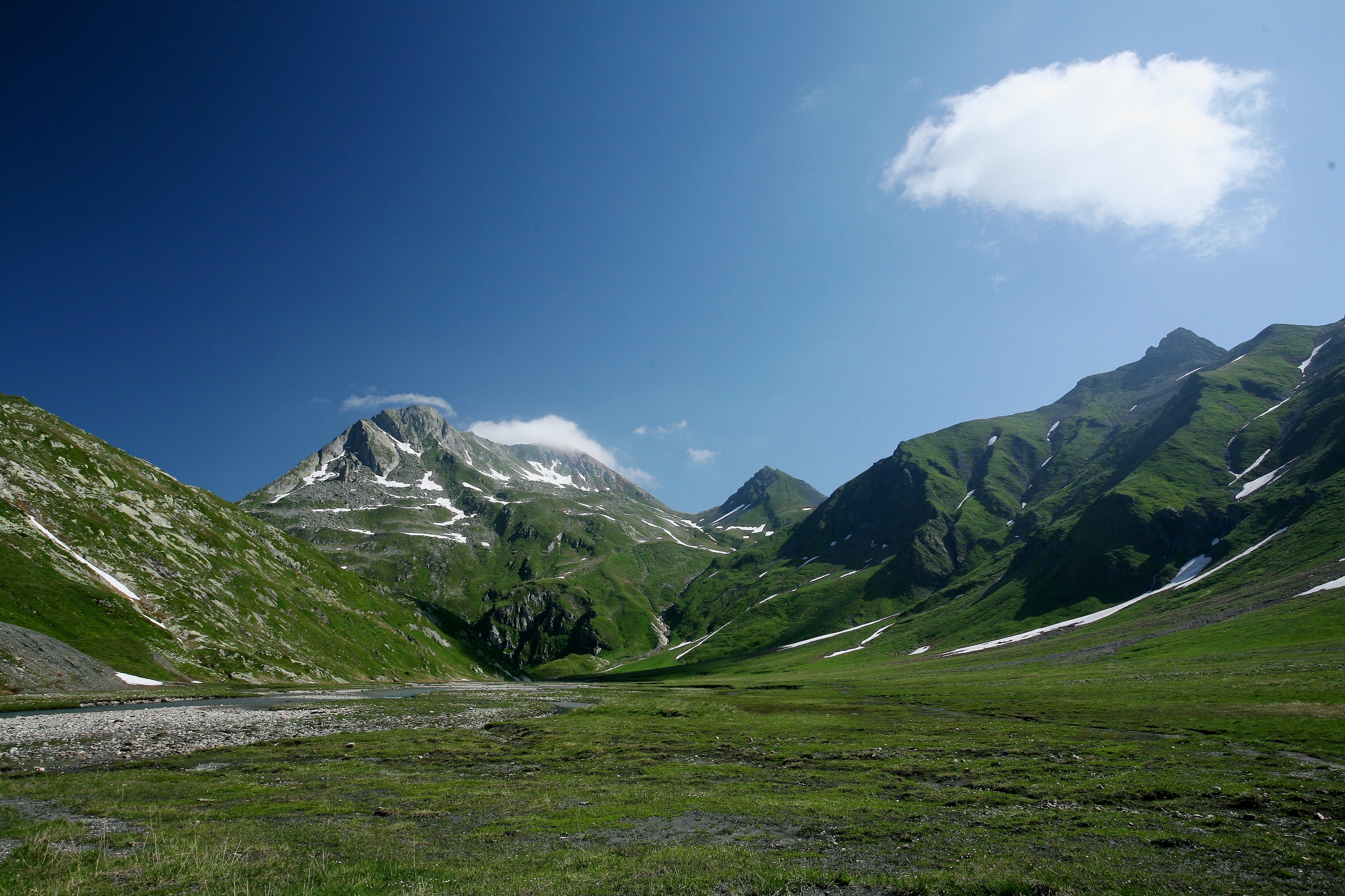
Greina Pass

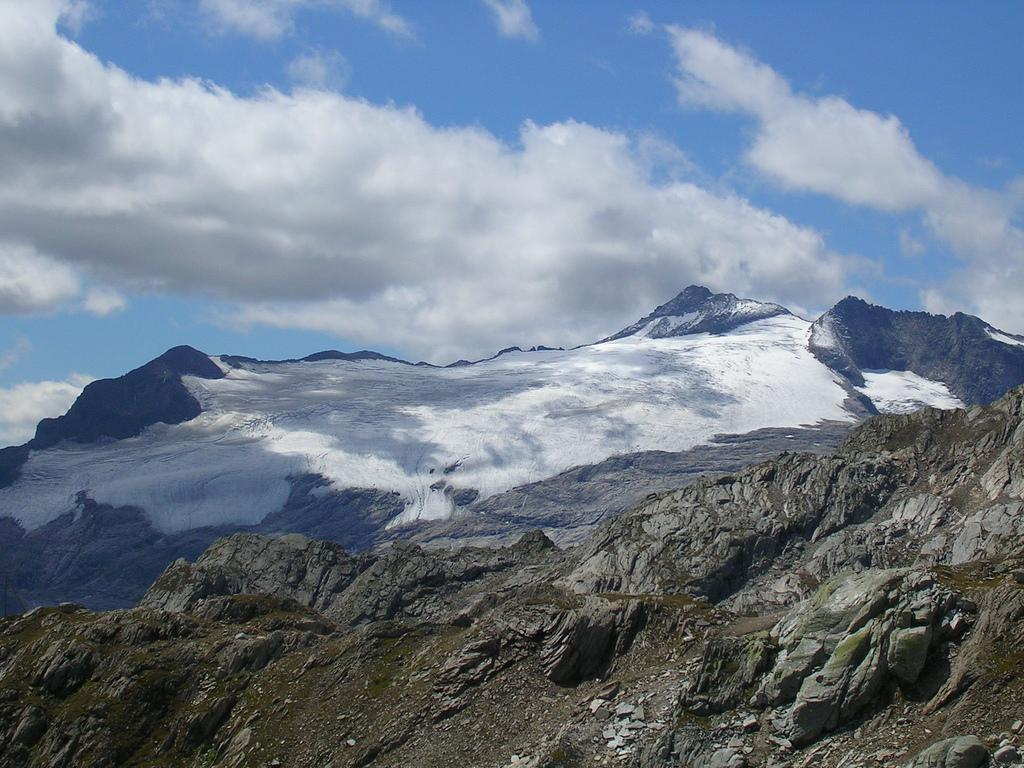
Basodino

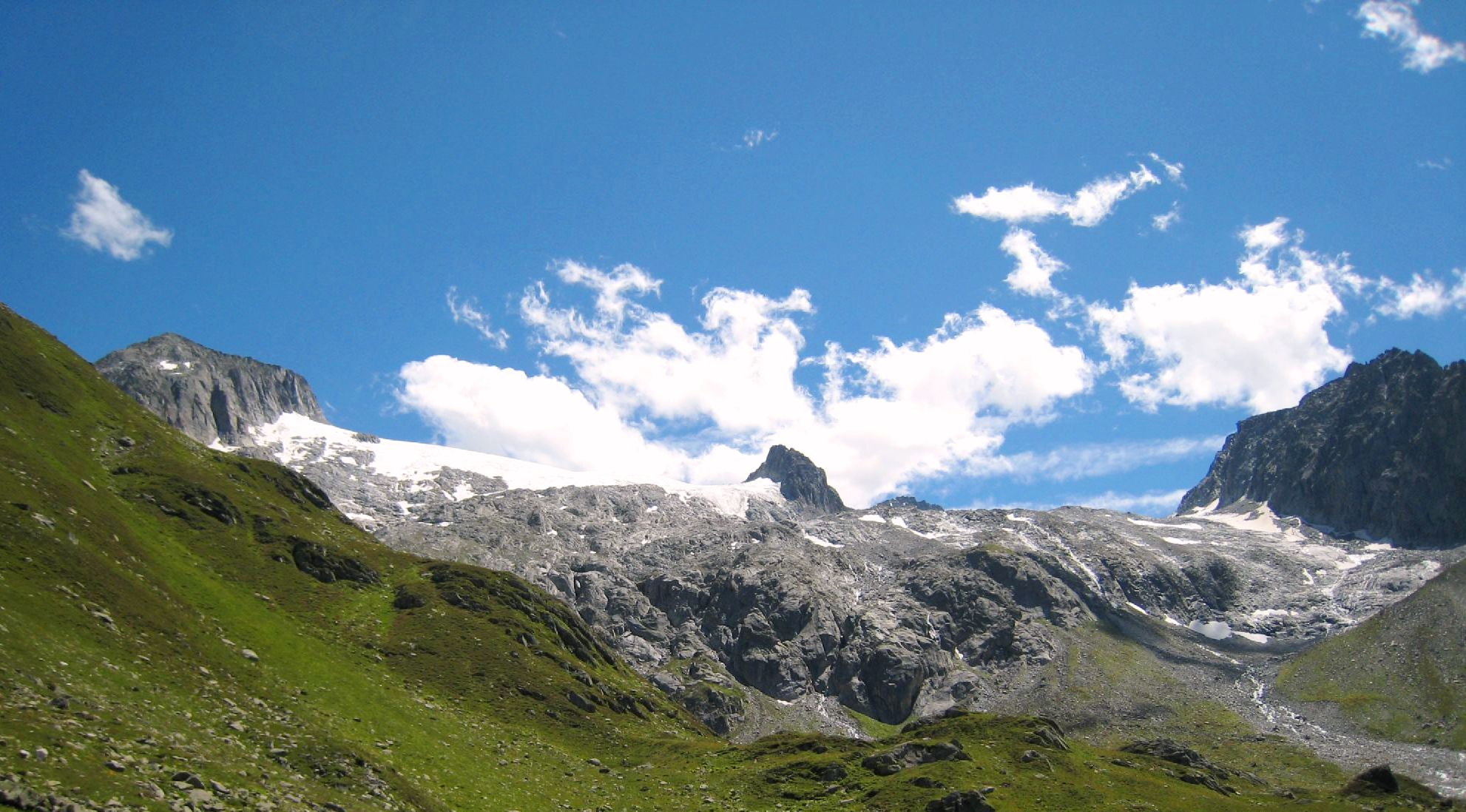
Piz Medel

The chief peaks of the Lepontine Alps are:

Name	Elevation	
Name	m	ft
Monte Leone	3,553	11,684
Rheinwaldhorn	3,402	11,149
Güferhorn	3,393	11,132
Blinnenhorn	3,384	11,103
Basodino	3,276	10,749
Pizzo Tambò	3,276	10,749
Helsenhorn	3,274	10,742
Wasenhorn	3,255	10,680
Ofenhorn	3,242	10,637
Scherbadung (Monte Cervandone)	3,213	10,542
Piz Medel	3,203	10,509
Scopi	3,200	10,499
Pizzo Rotondo	3,197	10,489
Hohsandhorn	3,182	10,440
Piz Terri	3,151	10,331
Pizzo di Cassimoi	3,129	10,266
Kastelhorn	3,128	10,262
Piz Aul	3,124	10,250
Pizzo Pesciora	3,120	10,247
Witenwasserenstock	3,084	10,119
Campo Tencia	3,075	10,089
Leckihorn	3,069	10,069
Bruschghorn	3,054	10,020
Lorenzhorn	3,048	10,000
Alperschällihorn	3,045	9,991
Chilchalphorn	3,040	9,974
Saashörner	3,039	9,970
Pizzo di Boccareccio	3,027	9,931
Piz Corbet	3,025	9,925
Piz Blas	3,023	9,918
Monte Giove	3,010	9,876
Cime di Val Loga	3,004	9,856
Pizzo Centrale	3,003	9,853
Pizzas d'Anarosa	3,002	9,850
Piz Beverin	2,998	9,843
Weisshorn (Splugen)	2,992	9,817
Teurihorn	2,973	9,754
Piz de Mucia	2,967	9,734
Piz Pombi	2,967	9,734
Pizzo Lucendro	2,959	9,708
Piz Denter	2,956	9,698
Piz Tomul	2,949	9,676
Pizzo Moro	2,948	9,672
Piz Cavel	2,944	9,659
Piz Caschleglia	2,936	9,633
Barenhorn	2,932	9,620
Six Madun (Badus)	2,932	9,619
Poncione di Manió	2,925	9,596
Pizzo Fiorèra	2,921	9,583
Pizzo Forno	2,907	9,537
Piz Muraun	2,899	9,512
Zervreilahorn	2,898	9,508
Valserhorn	2,886	9,469
Piz Serenastga	2,874	9,429
Cima della Bianca	2,893	9,491
Punta della Rossa	2,888	9,475
Poncione di Valleggia	2,873	9,426
Punta Valgrande	2,857	9,373
Monte Cistella	2,851	9,353
Piz Canal	2,846	9,337
I Rodond	2,830	9,280
Piz Maler	2,790	9,150
Fil de Dragiva	2,786	9,140
Piz Lukmanier	2,778	9,115
Piz Riein	2,762	9,062
Fibbia	2,738	8,983
Monte Prosa	2,738	8,983
Pizzo di Campedell	2,724	8,937
Piz Uccello	2,724	8,937
Pizzo del Torto	2,723	8,934
Pizzo di Röd	2,699	8,855
Pizzo Solögna	2,698	8,852
Rasiva	2,684	8,806
Cima di Piancabella	2,671	8,763
Pizzo d'Orsalia	2,664	8,740
Pizzo Malora	2,640	8,660
Cima de Nomnom	2,633	8,638
Poncione dei Laghetti	2,616	8,583
Piz d'Arbeola	2,600	8,500
Breithorn	2,599	8,527
Pizzo Paglia	2,594	8,510
Piz Pazzola	2,581	8,468
Piz Radun	2,581	8,468
Piz de Cressim	2,575	8,448
Pizzo di Madéi	2,551	8,369
Piz Titschal	2,550	8,370
Pizzo Columbe	2,549	8,363
Pizzo Cavregasco	2,535	8,317
Poncione Pro do Rodùc	2,522	8,274
Pizzo di Cadrèigh	2,516	8,225
Piz de Setag	2,476	8,123
Pizzo d'Orsalietta	2,476	8,123
Piz Vizan	2,471	8,107
Pizzo di Porcaresc	2,467	8,094
Pizzo Campanile	2,458	8,064
Poncione della Marcia	2,454	8,051
Punta d'Orogna	2,447	8,028
Madone di Càmedo	2,446	8,025
Poncione di Piotta	2,439	8,002
Pizzo di Brünesc	2,429	7,969
Cima dell'Uomo	2,390	7,840
Cima dello Stagn	2,382	7,815
Pizzo Bombögn	2,331	7,648
Poncione d'Alnasca	2,301	7,549
Schlüechtli	2,283	7,490
Pala da Tgiern	2,279	7,477
Madom da Sgióf	2,265	7,431
Pizzo Alzasca	2,262	7,421
Pizzo Muncréch	2,252	7,388
Corno di Gesero	2,227	7,306
Camoghè	2,226	7,303
Monte Zeda	2,156	7,073
Glaser Grat	2,124	6,969
Präzer Höhi	2,120	6,960
Piz Mundaun	2,065	6,775
Pizzo Peloso	2,064	6,772
Madone (Locarno)	2,051	6,729
Crest dil Cut	2,016	6,614
Monte Berlinghera	1,930	6,330

== Glaciers ==
Main glaciers :

- Gries Glacier
- Paradies Glacier
- Basòdino Glacier

== List of passes ==
The chief passes of the Lepontine Alps are:

Mountain pass	location	type	elevation	
Mountain pass	location	type	m	ft
Zapport Pass	Hinterrhein to Malvaglia and Biasca	snow	3,079	10,103
Guferlücke	Canaltal to Lentatal (near Vals, Switzerland)	snow	2,980	9,777
Lentalücke	Hinterrhein to Vals	snow	2,954	9,692
Hohsand Pass	Binn to La Frua (Toce waterfalls)	snow	2,927	9,603
Lecki Pass	Realp to Oberwald VS	snow	2,912	9,554
Passo Rotondo	Airolo to Oberwald	snow	2,880	9,449
Kaltwasser Pass	Simplon Hospice to Alpe Veglia	snow	2,844	9,331
Scaradra Pass	Vals to Olivone	footpath	2,770	9,088
Satteltelücke	Vals to Vrin	footpath	2,768	9,082
Ritter Pass	Binn to Alpe Veglia	snow	2,692	8,832
Cavanna Pass	Realp to Bedretto	snow	2,611	8,566
Scatta Minoja	Devero to Formazza	bridle path	2,597	8,521
Bocca di Cadlimo	Airolo to the Lukmanier Pass	footpath	2,542	8,340
Valserberg	Hinterrhein to Vals	bridle path	2,507	8,225
Safierberg	Splügen to Safien	bridle path	2,490	8,170
Nufenen Pass	Ulrichen to Airolo	road	2,478	8,130
Geisspfad Pass	Binn to Devero	footpath	2,475	8,120
Gries Pass	Ulrichen to La Frua	bridle path	2,468	8,098
Passo di Naret	Fusio to Airolo	bridle path	2,443	8,015
Passo Valtendra	Alpe Veglia to Devero and Baceno	bridle path	2,431	7,976
Diesrut Pass	Vrin to Somvix	bridle path	2,424	7,953
Albrun Pass	Binn to Devero and Baceno	bridle path	2,410	7,907
Greina Pass	Olivone to Somvix	bridle path	2,360	7,743
San Giacomo Pass	Airolo to La Frua	bridle path	2,308	7,573
Passo di Buffalora	Mesocco to the Val Calanca	footpath	2,265	7,431
Passo dell'Uomo	Quinto, Switzerland to the Lukmanier Pass	bridle path	2,212	7,258
Splügen Pass	Thusis to Chiavenna	road	2,117	6,946
St Gotthard Pass	Andermatt to Airolo	road	2,114	6,936
San Bernardino Pass	Thusis to Bellinzona	road	2,063	6,769
Lukmanier Pass	Disentis to Olivone	road	1,917	6,289

== See also ==
- Swiss Alps
