= Valserhorn =

Mountain in Switzerland

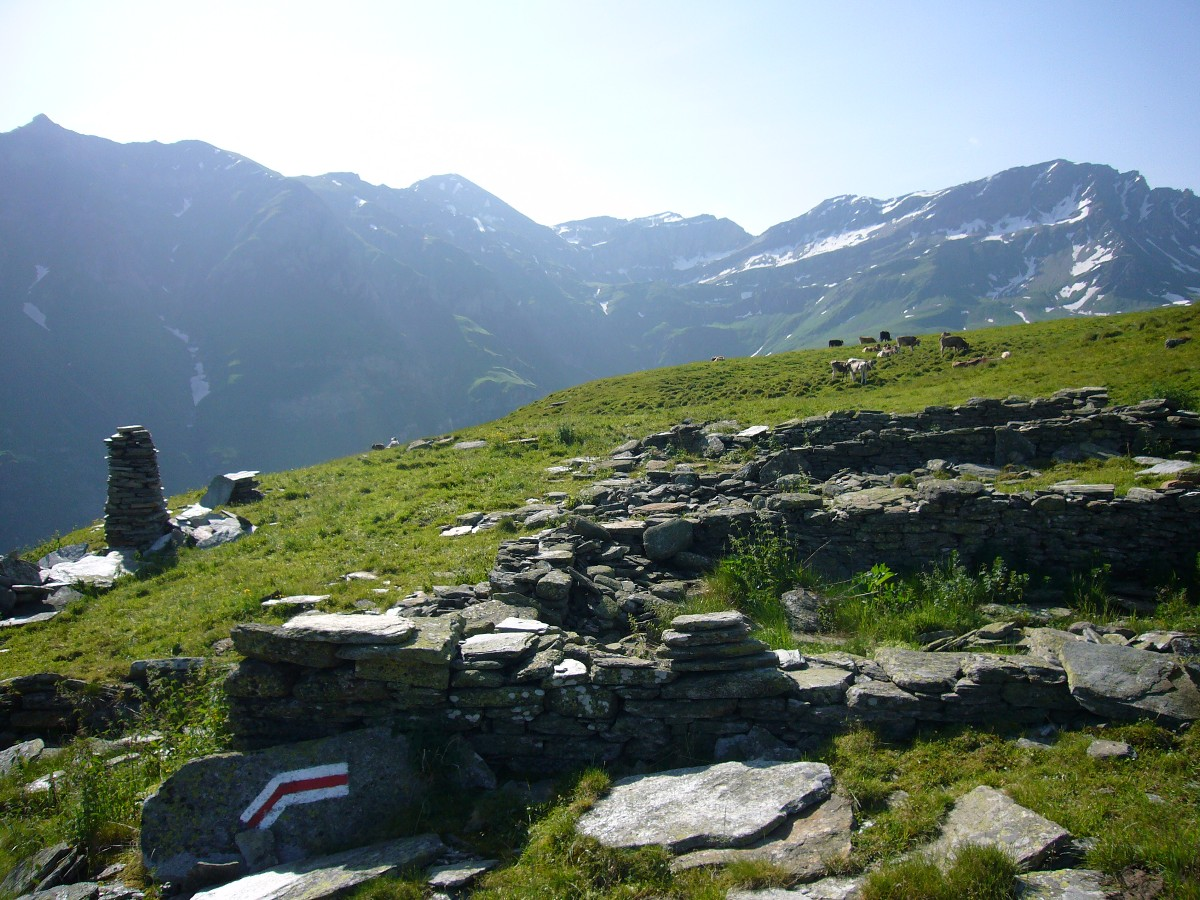
- from right: Valserhorn, Tällihorn 2820, Bärenhorn 2929 and Teischer 2688 (far left) from Selva Alp, above Vals

Highest point
- Elevation: 2,886 m (9,469 ft)
- Prominence: 236 m (774 ft)
- Parent peak: Bärenhorn
- Coordinates: 46°33′37.1″N 9°12′29.6″E

Geography
- Location within Switzerland
- Location: Graubünden, Switzerland
- Parent range: Lepontine Alps

Climbing
- Easiest route: The peak is accessible straight forward from Blauw Gufer Alp above Nufenen GR.

The Valserhorn (also spelled Valser Horn) is a summit of the Lepontine Alps, situated between Vals and Nufenen in the canton of Graubünden in Switzerland, on territory of both municipalities. With a prominence of 236 meters it is commonly agreed to be an independent peak to higher Bärenhorn (2929m) one mile to its northeast.

A popular hike starts at Zervreila, passes three remote lakes (Guraletschsee, Amperveilsee and Selvasee) and descends via Selva Alp to Vals. Vals is famous for its spa.
