= Placidus a Spescha =

Swiss mountain climber (1752–1833)

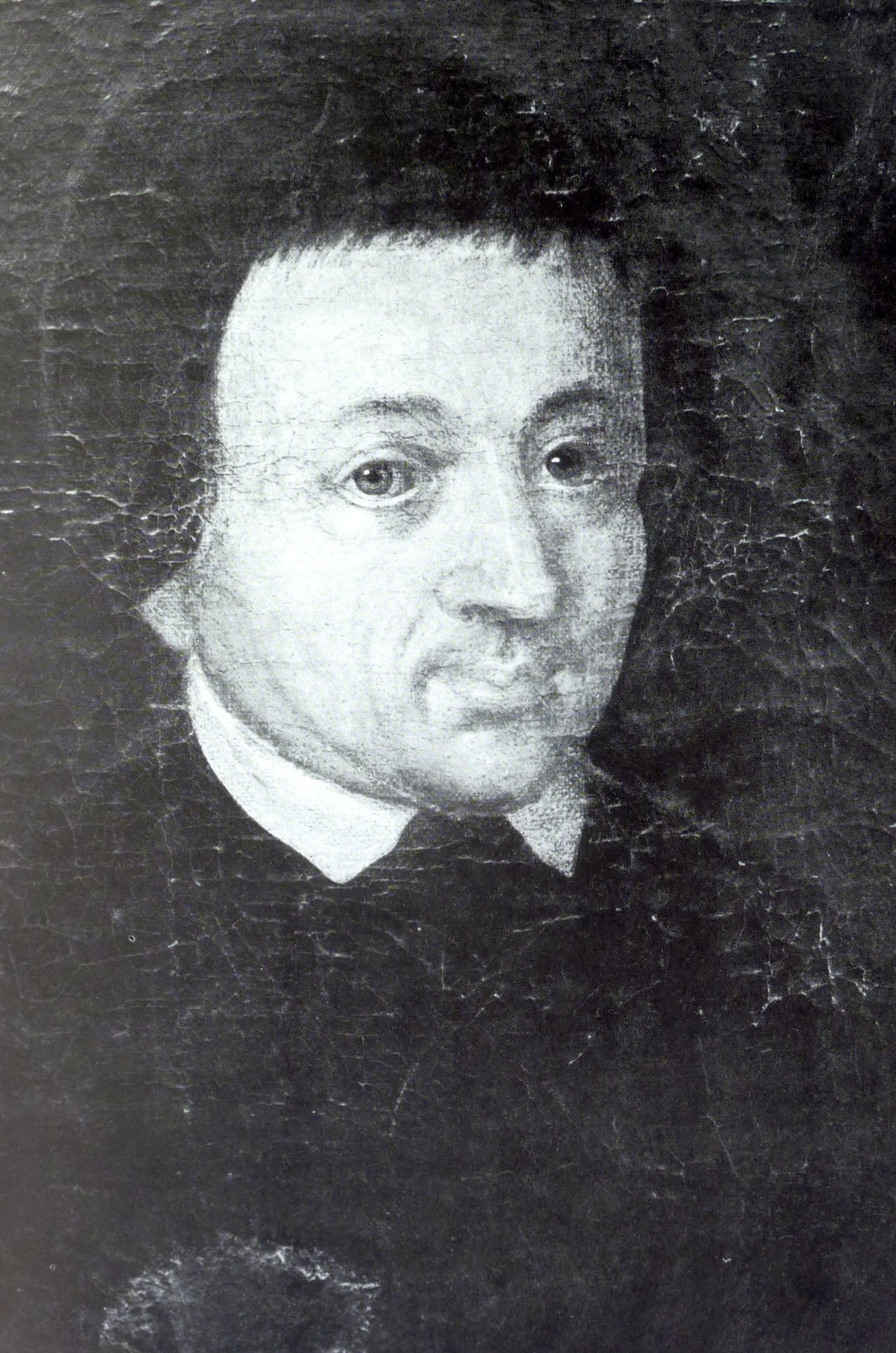
- Born: December 8, 1752; Trun, Switzerland
- Died: August 14, 1833 (aged 80); Trun, Switzerland

Signature
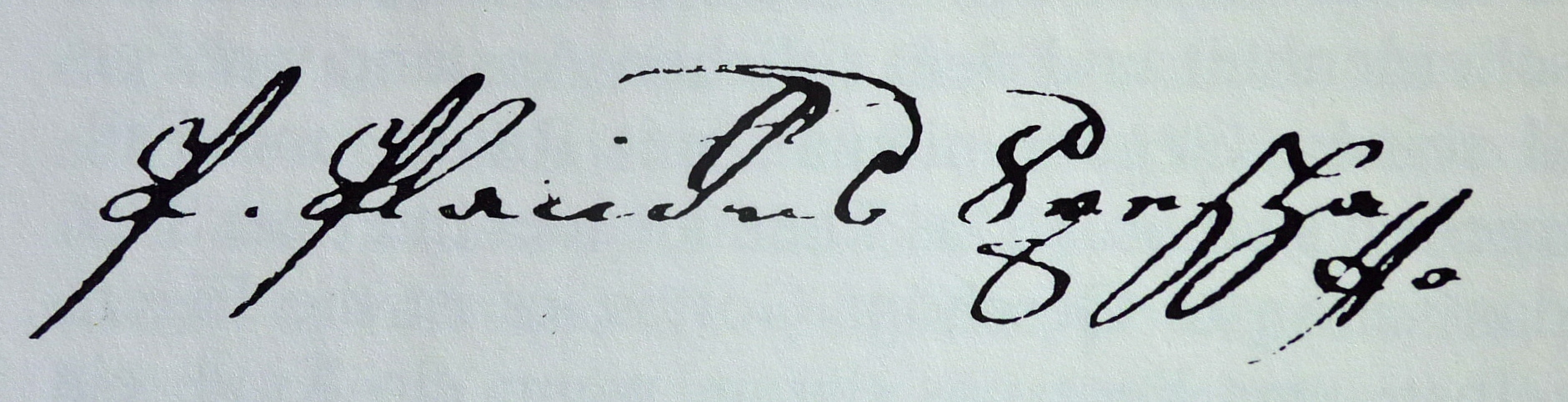

Placidus a Spescha (born Julius Baptist Spescha; December 8, 1752 – August 14, 1833) was a Benedictine monk and early Alpine explorer born in Trun, near Disentis, in the valley of the upper Rhine in Graubünden. He became a monk in 1774 in Disentis and went to Einsiedeln to complete his education.

The rest of his life was spent in serving various cures in his native valley, though he suffered much at the hands of his brother monks, who could not understand his scientific tastes. In 1799 he was accused of being a spy (his climbs and maps were held suspicious) in favour of the French invaders, and, when the French did come, he had to give up to them all his scientific collections. In addition he had the dreadful experience of learning, soon after his departure, that his monastery, with all its most precious archives, including his own original collection, had been burnt by order of a French general so as to punish the peasants who dared to resist his advance.

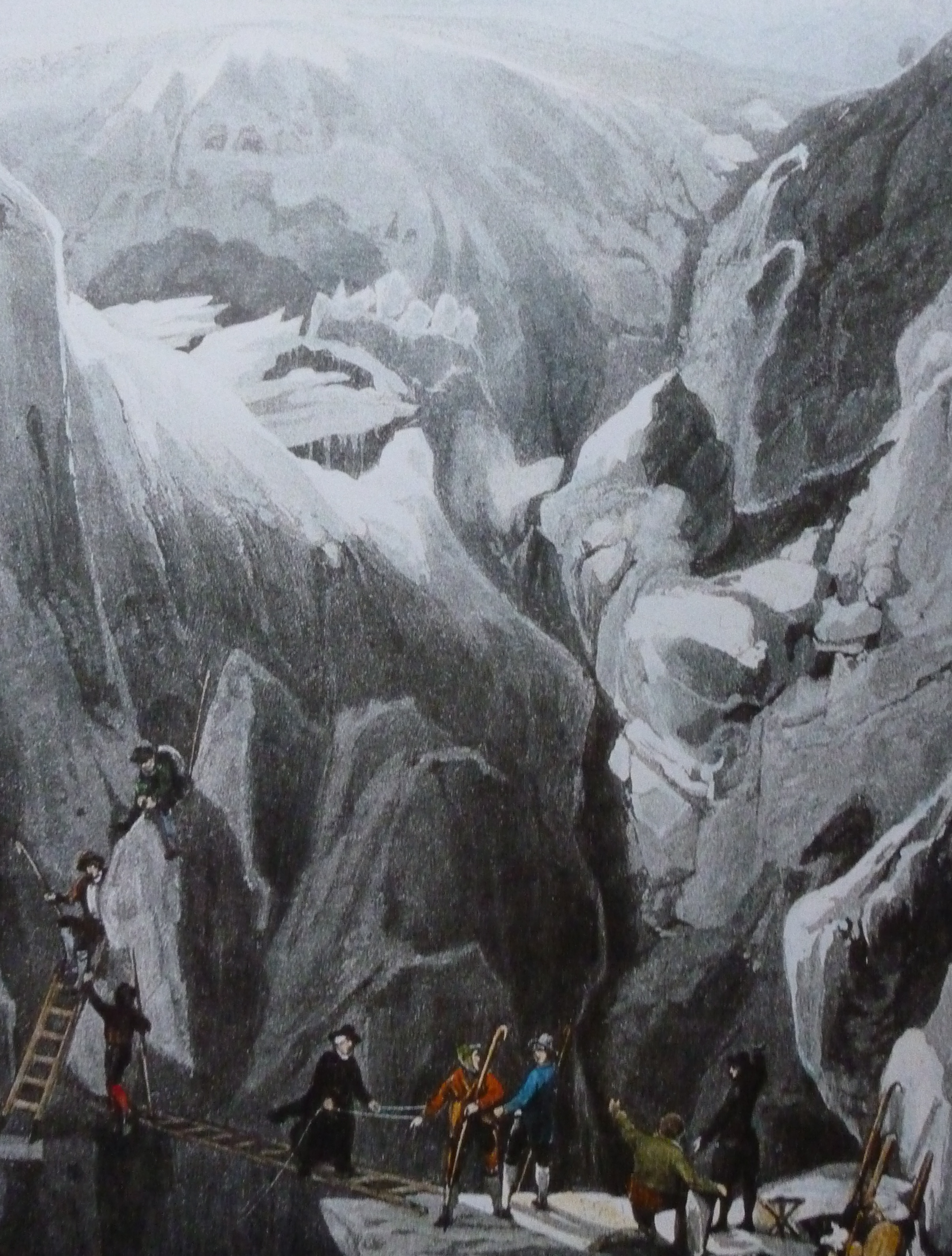
Placidus a Spescha ascending the Rheinwaldhorn (1818)

Despite all these disadvantages, Spescha achieved an extraordinary amount of success in his mountain explorations around his native valley. It is true that Spescha failed to attain the very highest summit, the Tödi, although in 1788 he ascended the Stockgron (11,214 ft), close to it, and only 673 ft lower, while in 1824, sitting on the depression (close to the Stockgron and 863 ft lower than the Todi), now called the "Porta da Spescha", he had the satisfaction of seeing the two local chamois hunters that he had sent forward actually attain the loftiest point. Here are the names of some of his principal climbs -in 1789, the Rheinwaldhorn (11,149 ft), the highest summit around the sources of the Hinter Rhine, and, in 1806, the Güferhorn (11,132 ft.), the second summit of that region; in 1792, the Oberalpstock (10,926 ft), the highest point anywhere near Disentis; in 1793, the Piz Urlaun (11,060 ft), near the Todi; in 1801, Piz Aul (10,250 ft) and Piz Scharboda (10,250 ft); and in 1802, Piz Terri (10,338 ft), these three mountains being the culminating points in the ranges that rise to the north of the Rheinwaldhorn group. Oddly enough, he does not seem to have visited any of the higher peaks of the Medel group, but only its outliers, here again the dread of glaciers probably holding him back. In the course of all his climbs he rarely set foot on a glacier, though in 1812, on occasion of his second ascent of the Oberalpstock, he did cross the easy glacier Brunni Pass (8977 ft).

The Raetian Museum in Chur contains part of his geological collection.
