= Bärenhorn =

Mountain in Graubünden, Switzerland

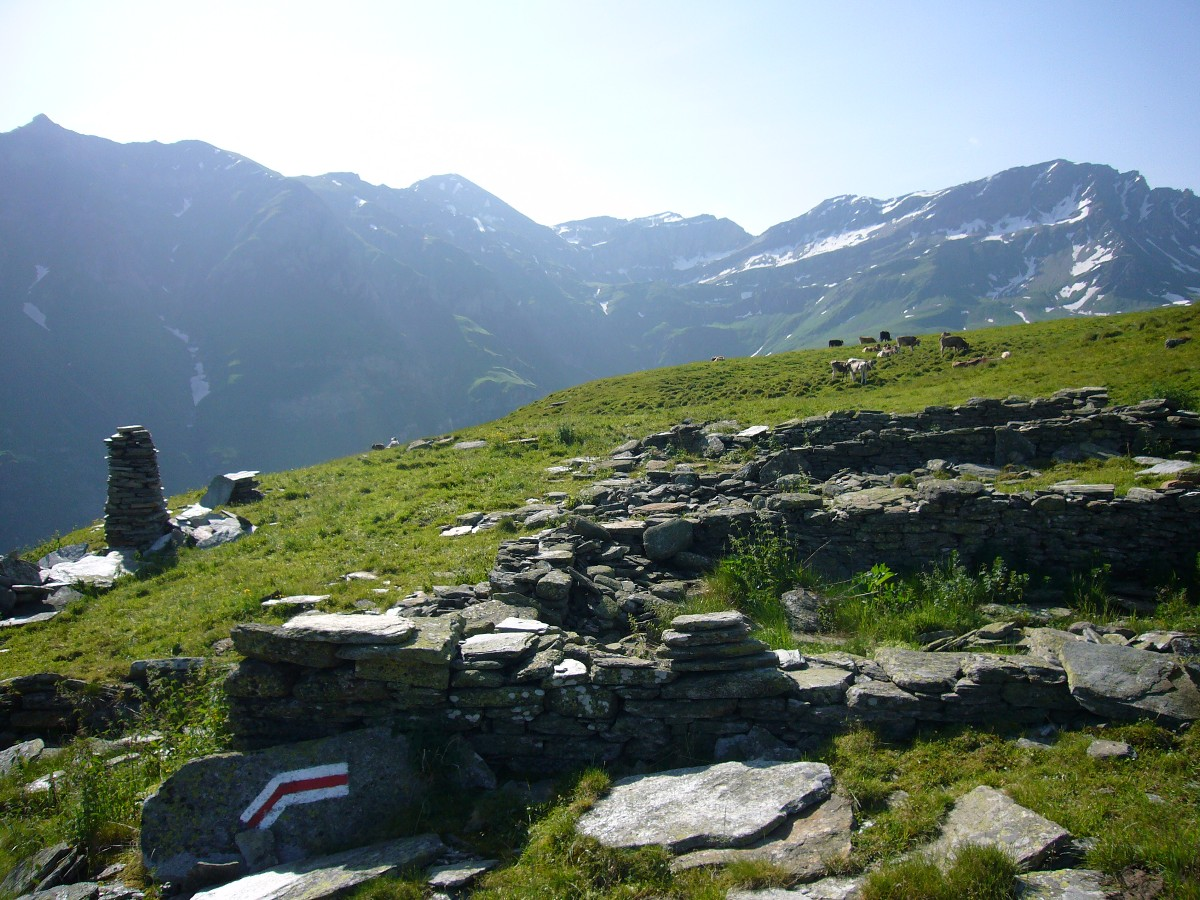
- from right: Valserhorn 2886, Tällihorn 2820, Bärenhorn (center left) and Teischer 2688 (far left) from Selva Alp, above Vals

Highest point
- Elevation: 2,929 m (9,610 ft)
- Prominence: 443 m (1,453 ft)
- Parent peak: Bruschghorn
- Coordinates: 46°34′32″N 9°13′54.8″E

Geography
- Location within Switzerland
- Location: Graubünden, Switzerland
- Parent range: Lepontine Alps

The Bärenhorn is a mountain of the Lepontine Alps, situated between Vals and Rheinwald in Graubünden, on territory of both municipalities. The northeastern face lies on territory of Safien.

A popular hike starts at Zervreila, passes three remote lakes (Guraletschsee, Amperveilsee and Selvasee) and descends via Selva Alp to Vals. Vals is famous for its spa.
