= Fanellhorn =

Mountain in Switzerland

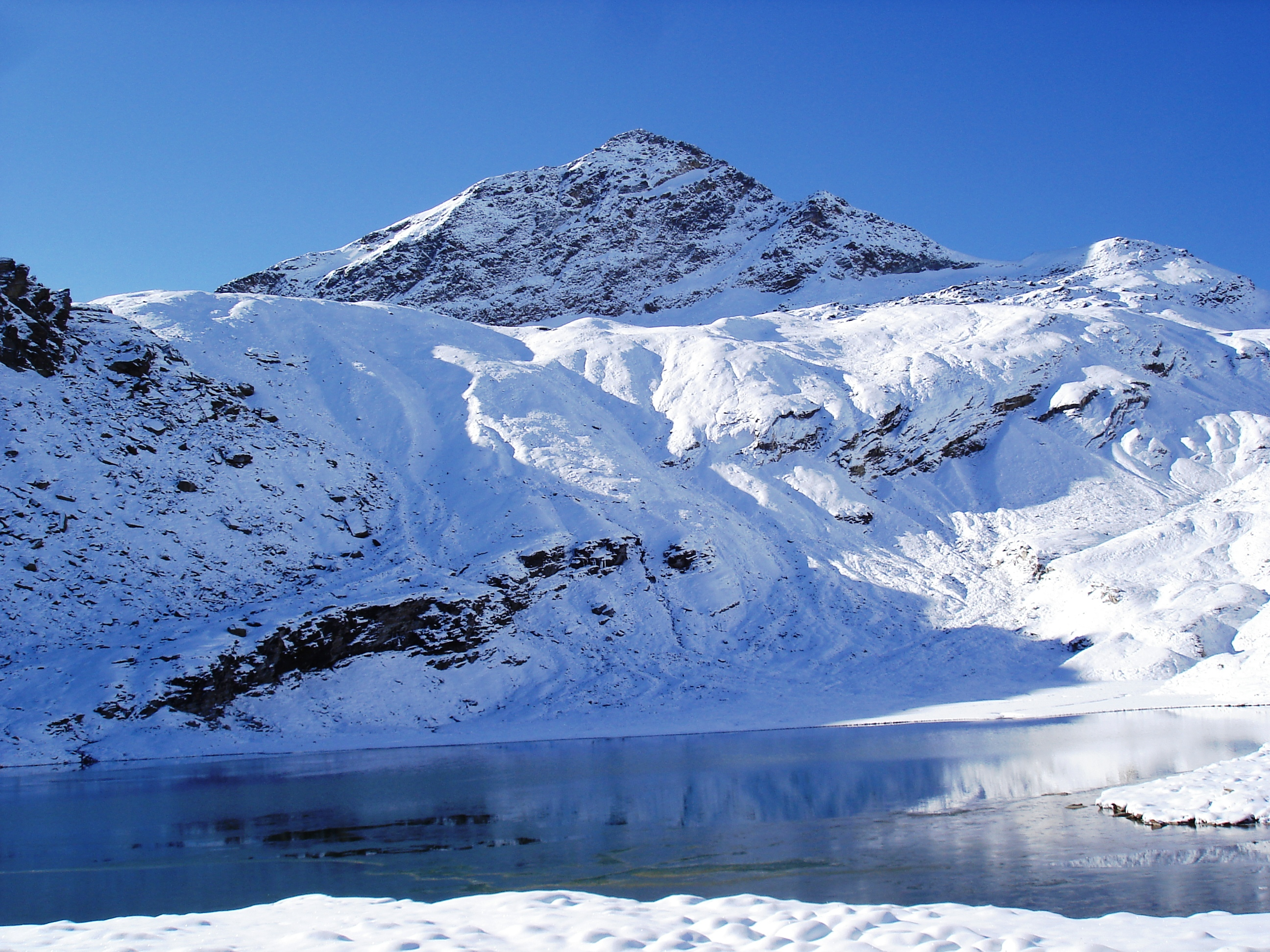
- With Guraletschsee (north side)

Highest point
- Elevation: 3,124 m (10,249 ft)
- Prominence: 301 m (988 ft)
- Parent peak: Rheinwaldhorn
- Listing: Alpine mountains above 3000 m
- Coordinates: 46°32′52″N 09°07′49.7″E

Geography
- Location within Switzerland
- Location: Graubünden, Switzerland
- Parent range: Lepontine Alps

Climbing
- Easiest route: mountain path leading to the summit northeast, past Guraletschsee.

The Fanellhorn is a mountain in the Lepontine Alps of Graubünden, Switzerland, south of Vals.

Its summit can be reached by hikers using a signposted path that comes from Guraletschsee and reaches the ridge "Fanellgrätli" on 2710 meters, leading to the peak from northeast (Swiss grade T4, signposted blue and white from point 2710, before it is red and white and T2). This is a possible extension to a popular hike starting at Zervreila, that passes the three lakes Guraletschsee, Amperveilsee and Selvasee and descends via Selva Alp to Vals. Vals is famous for its spa.

In winter it is a popular summit for enthusiasts of Ski touring, of which most choose a northerly descend.
