= Cima dei Cogn =

Mountain in Switzerland

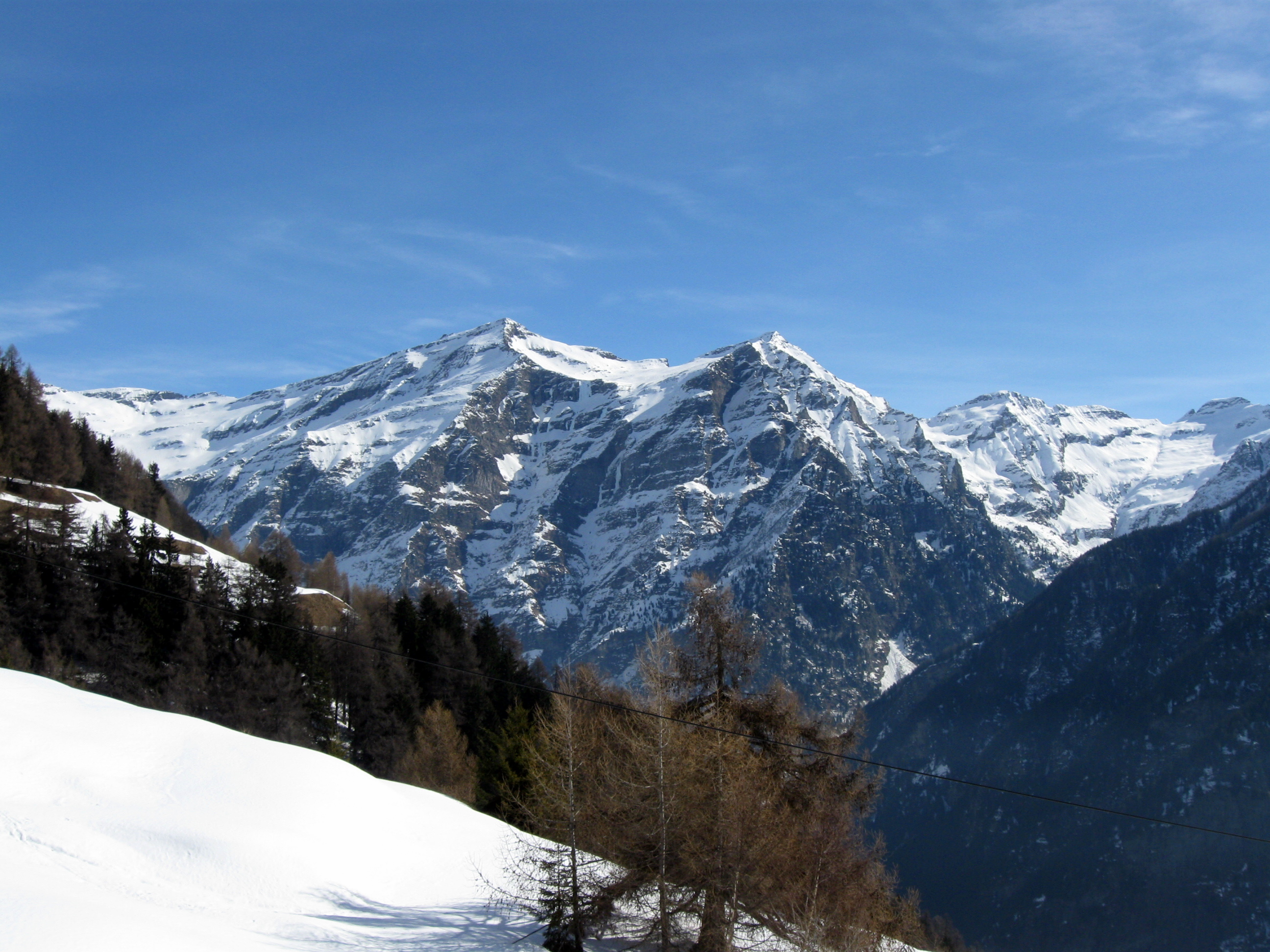
- Cima Rossa (left) and Cima dei Cogn (right) from the west side

Highest point
- Elevation: 3,063 m (10,049 ft)
- Prominence: 177 m (581 ft)
- Parent peak: Rheinwaldhorn
- Coordinates: 46°25′55.8″N 9°5′19.4″E

Geography
- Location within Switzerland
- Location: Graubünden/Ticino, Switzerland
- Parent range: Lepontine Alps

Cima dei Cogn is a mountain in the Lepontine Alps, located on the border between the cantons of Ticino and Graubünden. It lies south of the higher Cima Rossa.
