= Frunthorn =

Mountain in Switzerland

- Location within Switzerland

Highest point
- Elevation: 3,030 m (9,940 ft)
- Prominence: 291 m (955 ft)
- Parent peak: Piz Aul
- Coordinates: 46°35′10.3″N 9°05′20.6″E

Geography
- Location: Graubünden, Switzerland
- Parent range: Lepontine Alps

The Frunthorn is a mountain of the Swiss Lepontine Alps, overlooking the Zervreilasee in the canton of Graubünden. It is located west of Vals, on the ridge between the Val Lumnezia and the Valsertal.
