= Vernokhörner =

Mountain in Switzerland

- Location within Switzerland

Highest point
- Elevation: 3,043 m (9,984 ft)
- Prominence: 247 m (810 ft)
- Parent peak: Piz Terri
- Coordinates: 46°33′45″N 9°1′37″E

Geography
- Location: Ticino/Graubünden, Switzerland
- Parent range: Lepontine Alps

The Vernokhörner are a multi-summited mountain of the Lepontine Alps, located on the border between the Swiss cantons of Ticino and Graubünden. They lie approximately halfway between the lakes of Luzzone and Zervreila. The main summit has an elevation of 3,043 metres above sea level.
