= Furggeltihorn =

Mountain in Switzerland

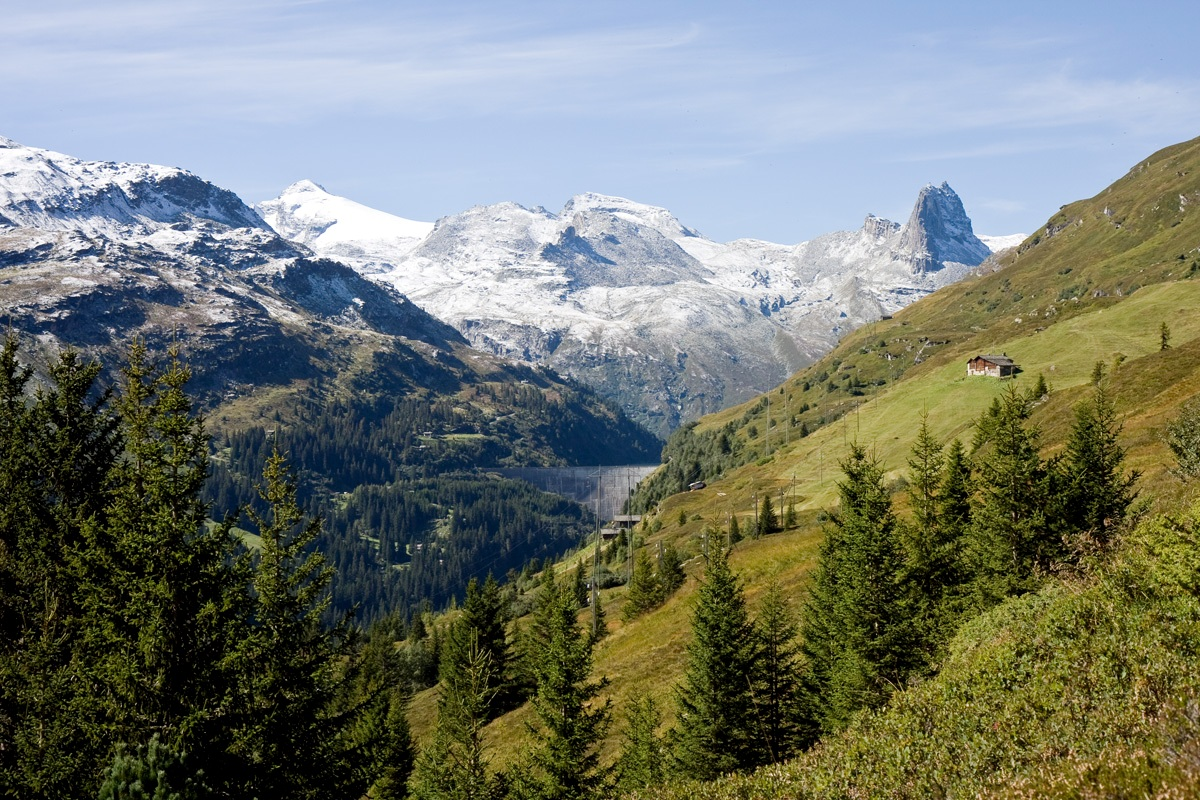
- Furggeltihorn (center) and Zervreilahorn (right)

Highest point
- Elevation: 3,043 m (9,984 ft)
- Prominence: 180 m (590 ft)
- Parent peak: Rheinwaldhorn
- Coordinates: 46°32′2.8″N 9°3′47.3″E

Geography
- Location within Switzerland
- Location: Graubünden, Switzerland
- Parent range: Lepontine Alps

The Furggeltihorn is a mountain of the Lepontine Alps, overlooking the Zervreilasee in the canton of Graubünden.
