= Plattenberg =

Mountain in Switzerland

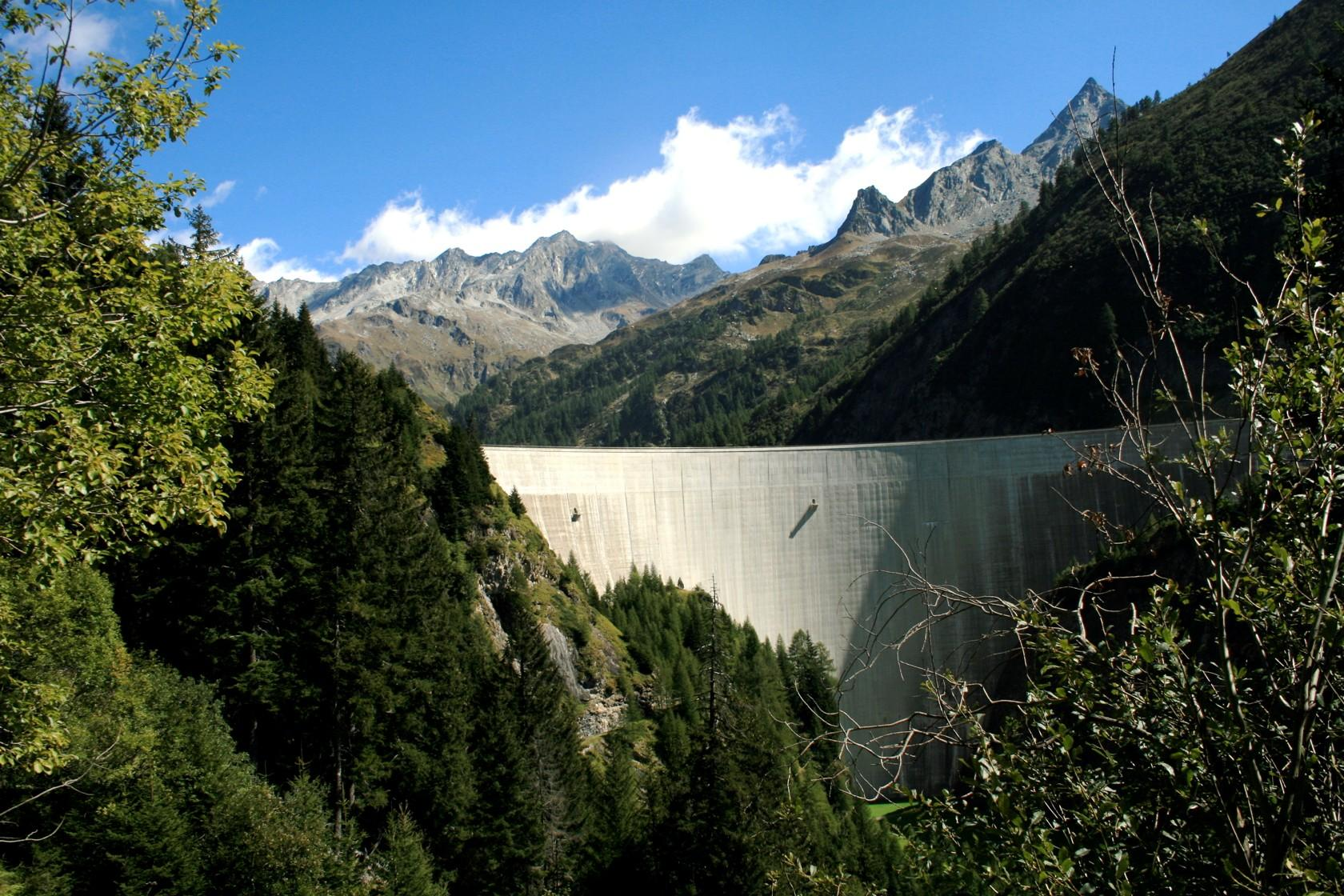
- The Plattenberg (centre-left) from the Luzzone dam

Highest point
- Elevation: 3,041 m (9,977 ft)
- Prominence: 59 m (194 ft)
- Parent peak: Vernokhörner
- Coordinates: 46°33′29.9″N 9°1′24.3″E

Geography
- Location within Switzerland
- Location: Ticino/Graubünden, Switzerland
- Parent range: Lepontine Alps

The Plattenberg is a mountain of the Lepontine Alps, located on the border between the Swiss cantons of Ticino and Graubünden. It lies approximately halfway between the lakes of Luzzone and Zervreila.
