= Torrone di Nav =

Mountain in Switzerland

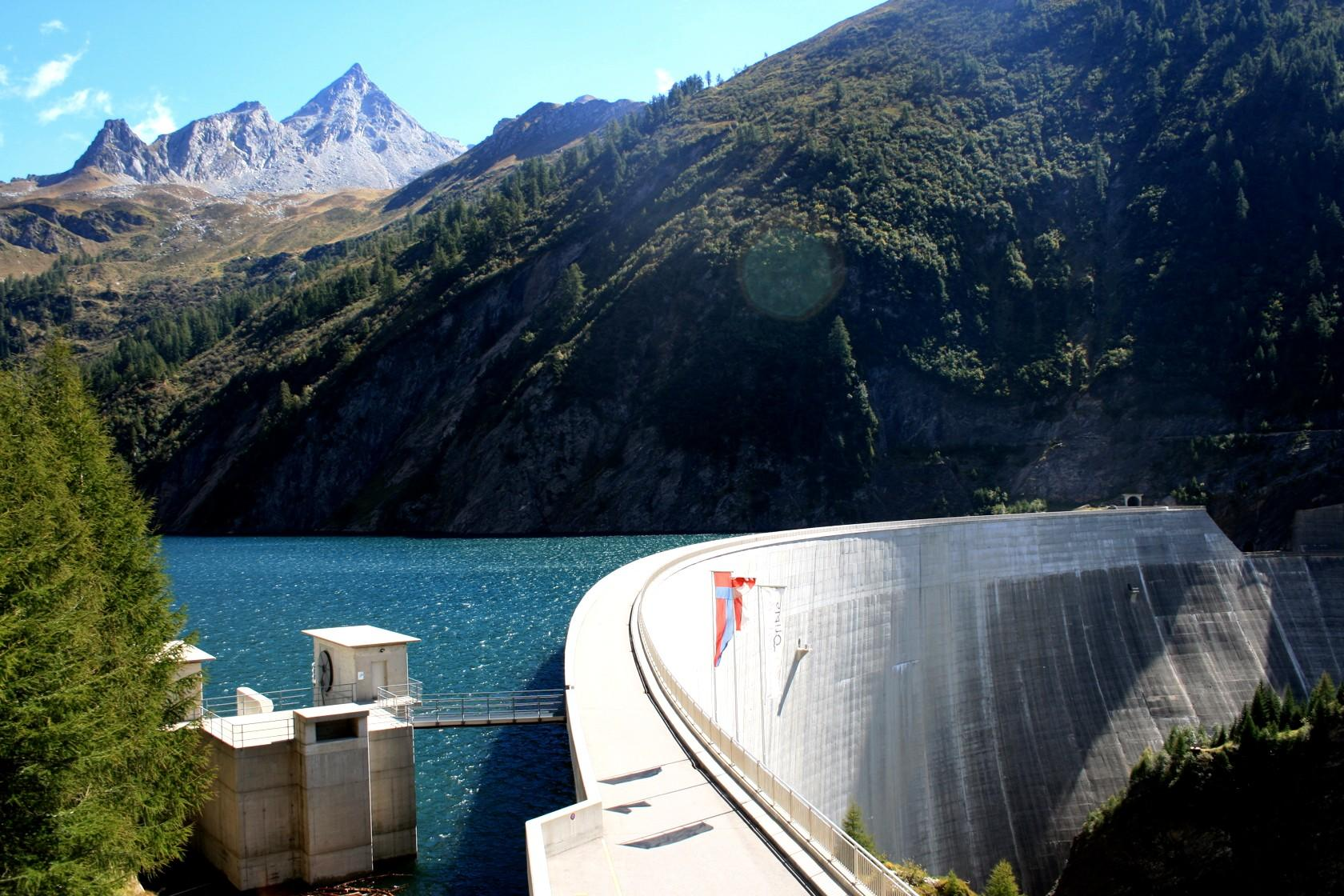
- The Torrone di Nav (left peak) from the lake of Luzzone

Highest point
- Elevation: 2,832 m (9,291 ft)
- Prominence: 102 m (335 ft)
- Parent peak: Rheinwaldhorn
- Coordinates: 46°32′50.4″N 8°59′36.9″E

Geography
- Location within Switzerland
- Location: Ticino, Switzerland
- Parent range: Lepontine Alps

The Torrone di Nav is a mountain of the Swiss Lepontine Alps, located east of Olivone in the canton of Ticino. On its northern side it overlooks the lake of Luzzone.
