= Zervreilahorn =

Mountain in Switzerland

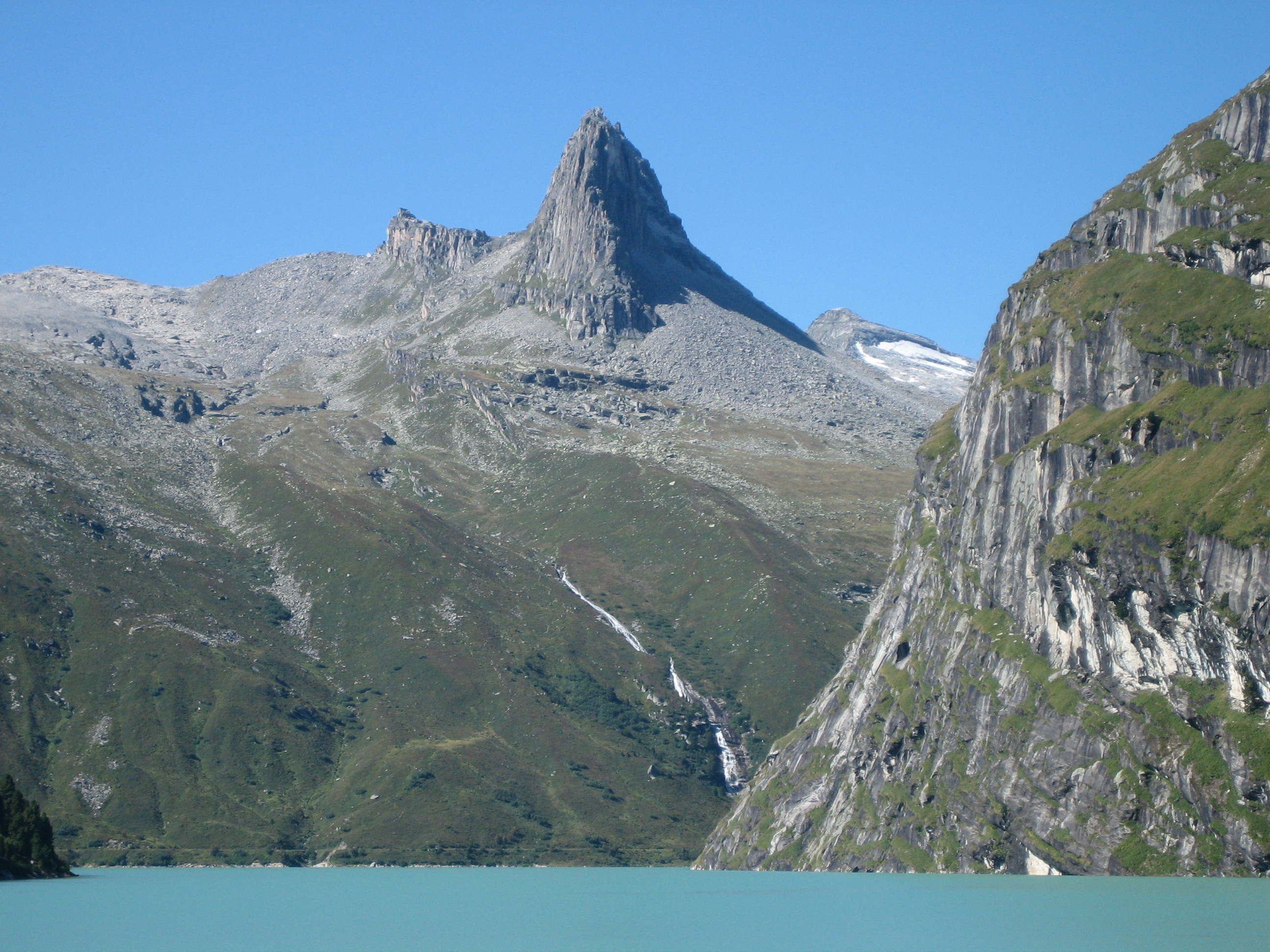
- Zervreilasee in the foreground

Highest point
- Elevation: 2,898 m (9,508 ft)
- Prominence: 186 m (610 ft)
- Parent peak: Rheinwaldhorn
- Coordinates: 46°33′02″N 9°03′41″E

Geography
- Location within Switzerland
- Location: Graubünden, Switzerland
- Parent range: Lepontine Alps

The Zervreilahorn is a mountain of the Swiss Lepontine Alps, located south of Vals in the canton of Graubünden. The mountain overlooks the Zervreilasee on the north.
