= Güferhorn =

Mountain in Switzerland

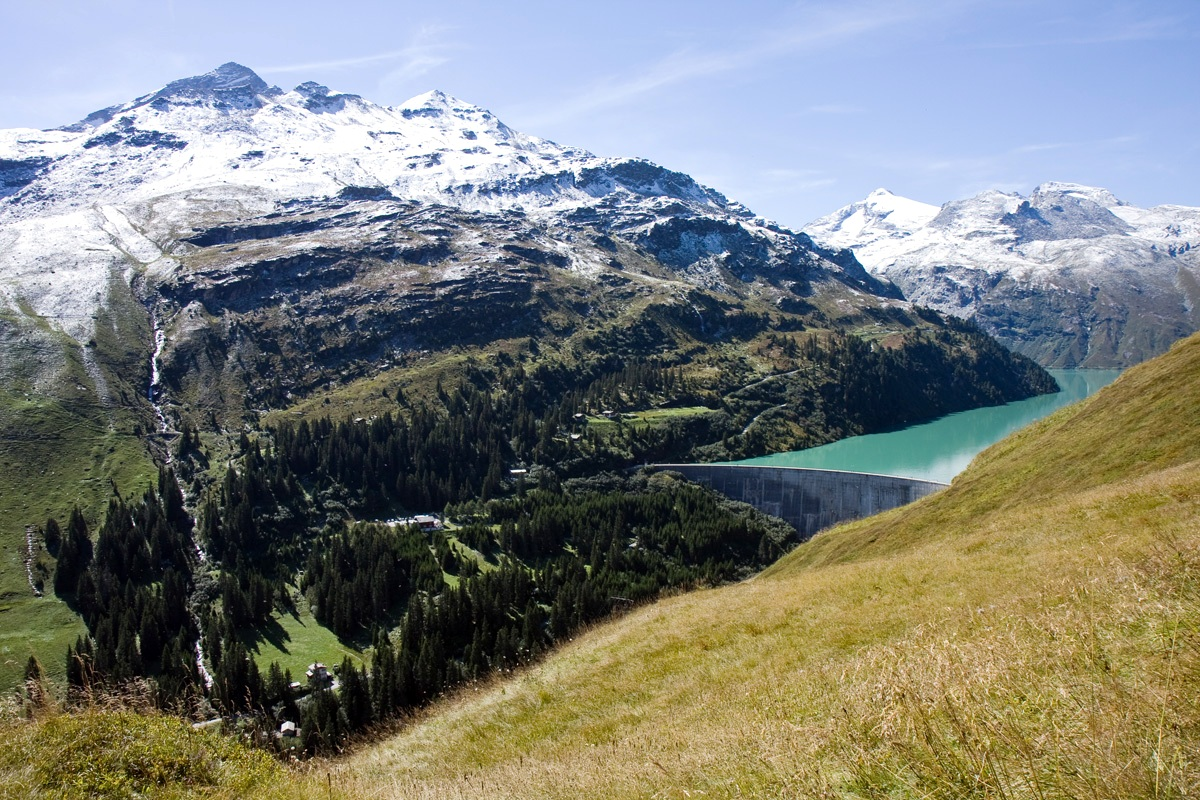
- The Güferhorn (right) from Zervreilasee

Highest point
- Elevation: 3,379 m (11,086 ft)
- Prominence: 400 m (1,300 ft)
- Parent peak: Rheinwaldhorn
- Listing: Alpine mountains above 3000 m
- Coordinates: 46°30′45″N 9°3′47.1″E

Geography
- Location within Switzerland
- Location: Switzerland
- Parent range: Lepontine Alps

The Güferhorn is a mountain in the Lepontine Alps, located between the valleys of Vals and Hinterrhein in Graubünden. At 3,379 metres above sea level it is the highest summit of the Lepontine Alps lying east of the Rheinwaldhorn. The northern side of the massif is covered by the Güfergletscher, a 2 kilometres long glacier. It lies above 2,600 metres on the east side of a ridge starting at the summit of the Güferhorn and separating the valleys of Länta and Canaltal, both converging at the Zervreilasee, south of Vals.
