= Piz Aul =

Mountain in Switzerland

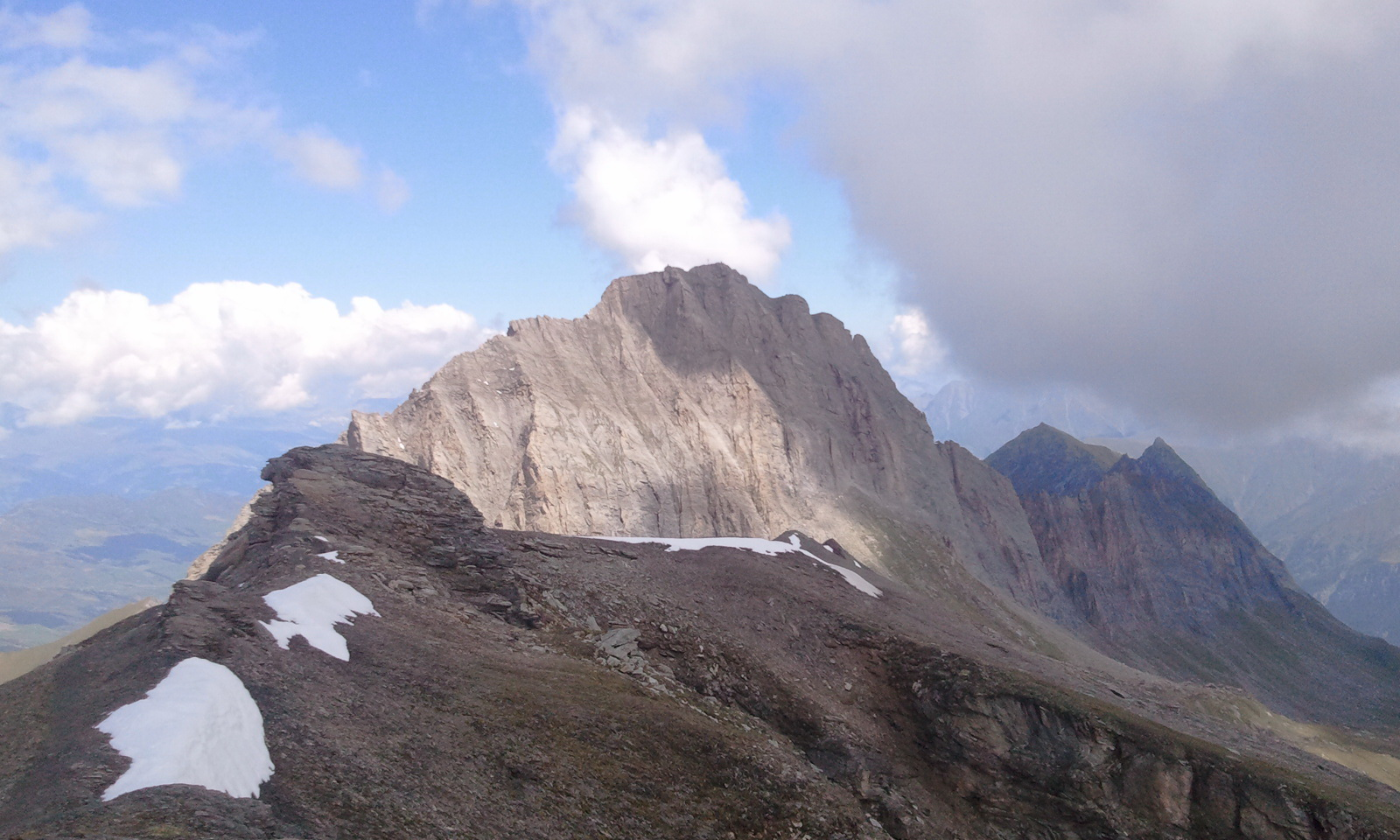
- View from Faltschonhorn (south side)

Highest point
- Elevation: 3,121 m (10,240 ft)
- Prominence: 395 m (1,296 ft)
- Parent peak: Rheinwaldhorn
- Listing: Alpine mountains above 3000 m
- Coordinates: 46°37′22.1″N 9°7′28.2″E

Geography
- Location within Switzerland
- Location: Graubünden, Switzerland
- Parent range: Lepontine Alps

Climbing
- First ascent: Probably by one Christian Janken. First recorded ascent by Placidus a Spescha in 1801.

Piz Aul is a mountain of the Lepontine Alps, overlooking Vals in the canton of Graubünden.
