= Vogelberg =

Mountain in Switzerland

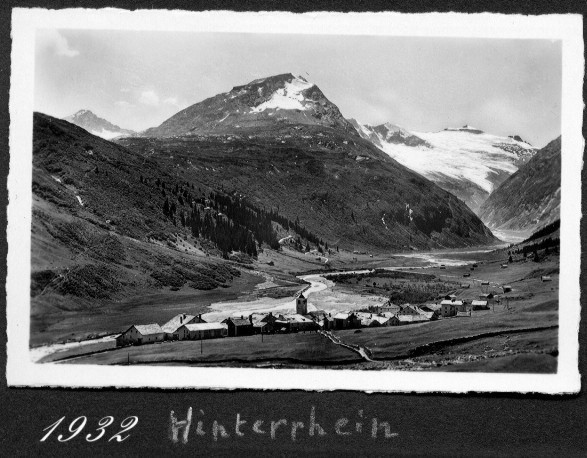
- The snowy massif of the Vogelberg (right) from Hinterrhein

Highest point
- Elevation: 3,218 m (10,558 ft)
- Prominence: 303 m (994 ft)
- Parent peak: Rheinwaldhorn
- Listing: Alpine mountains above 3000 m
- Coordinates: 46°28′41.9″N 9°3′54.6″E

Geography
- Location within Switzerland
- Location: Graubünden/Ticino, Switzerland
- Parent range: Lepontine Alps

The Vogelberg is a 3,218 metres high mountain of the Lepontine Alps, located on the border between the Swiss cantons of Ticino and Graubünden. It is the highest summit of the Lepontine Alps south of the Rheinwaldhorn. The Vogelberg is a large glaciated massif consisting of several secondary summits: Pizzo Cramorino (3,134 metres) on the west side and Rheinquellhorn (3,200 metres) on the east. The northern flanks are covered by the Paradies Glacier at the source of the Hinterrhein. The southern side, overlooking the valley of Malvaglia (Ticino) is steeper and has no glaciers.
