= Pizzo Pianca =

Mountain in Switzerland

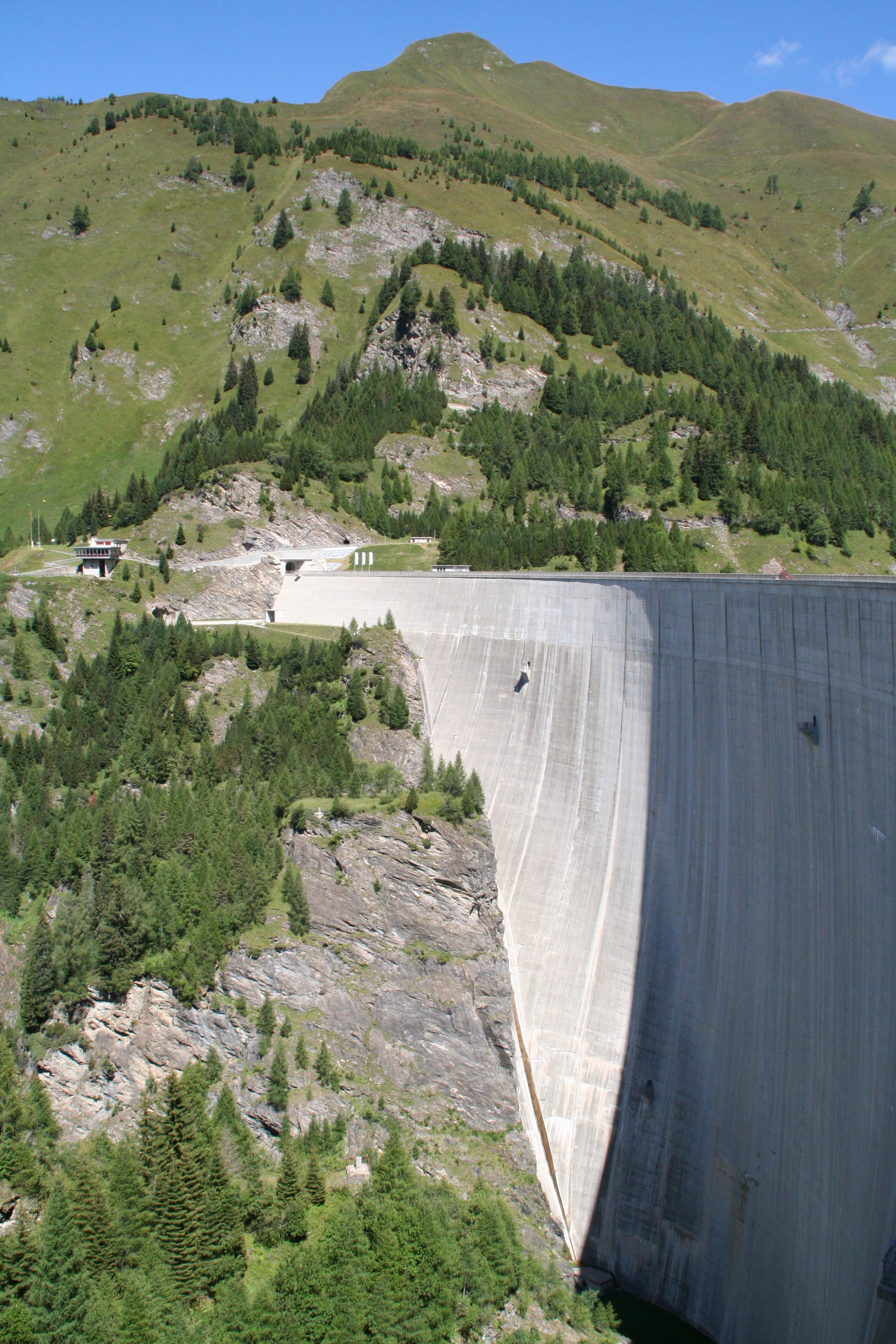
- View from the Luzzone dam

Highest point
- Elevation: 2,377 m (7,799 ft)
- Prominence: 236 m (774 ft)
- Parent peak: Pizzo Marumo
- Coordinates: 46°34′35″N 8°57′44″E

Geography
- Location within Switzerland
- Location: Ticino, Switzerland
- Parent range: Lepontine Alps

Pizzo Pianca is a mountain of the Swiss Lepontine Alps, located north of Olivone in the canton of Ticino. On its southern side it overlooks the lake of Luzzone.
