= Cima Rossa =

Mountain in Switzerland

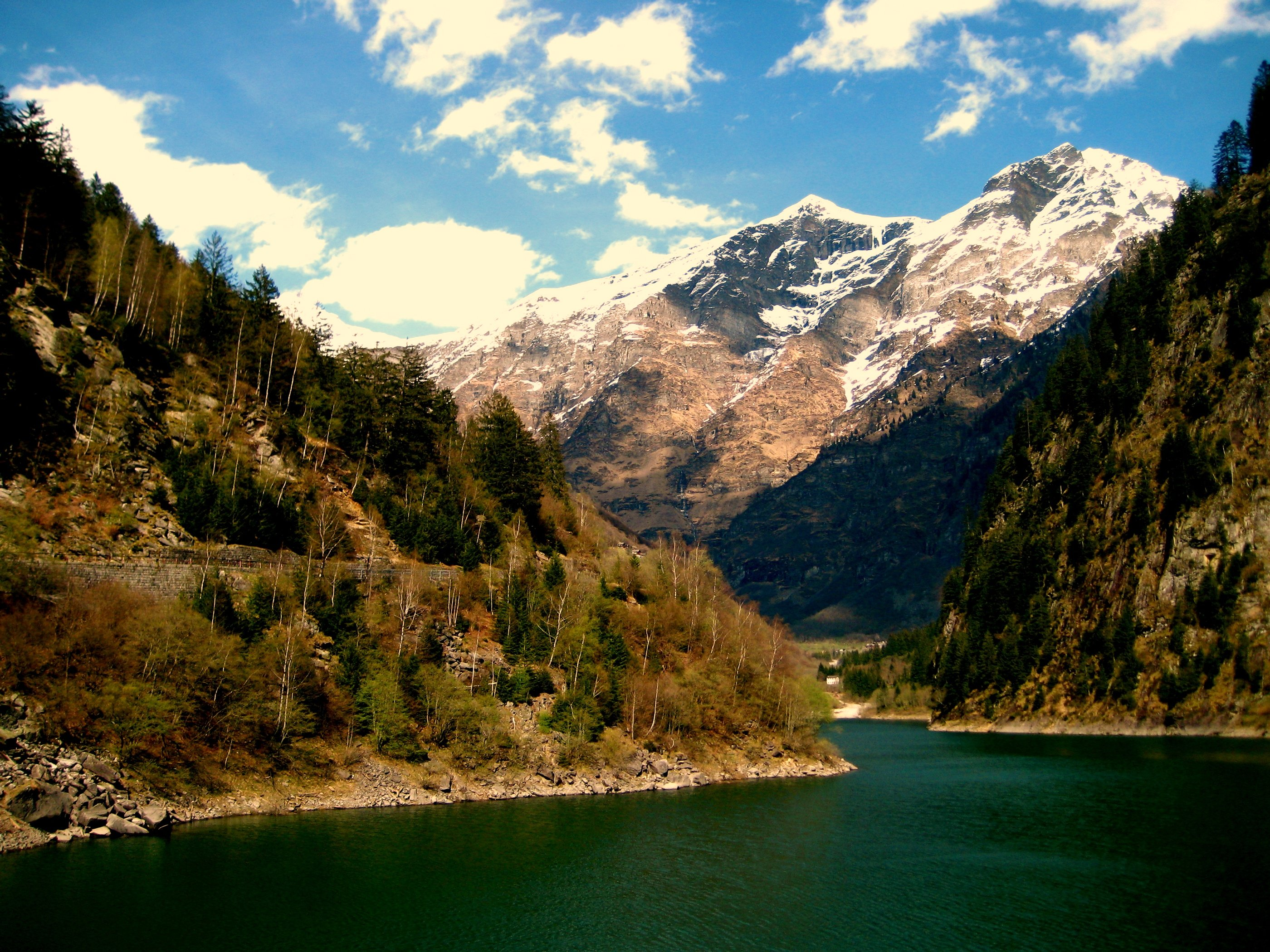
- Cima Rossa (centre-right) from Lago di Malvaglia

Highest point
- Elevation: 3,161 m (10,371 ft)
- Prominence: 236 m (774 ft)
- Parent peak: Vogelberg
- Coordinates: 46°26′37.5″N 9°5′13.4″E

Geography
- Location within Switzerland
- Location: Graubünden/Ticino, Switzerland
- Parent range: Lepontine Alps

Cima Rossa is a 3,161 metres high mountain in the Lepontine Alps, located on the border between the cantons of Ticino and Graubünden. On the west side it overlooks the valley of Malvaglia (Ticino) and on the east side it overlooks the valley of Calanca (Graubünden).

Cima Rossa is connected to the higher massif of the Vogelberg by a four km ridge, not descending lower than 2,925 metres. A secondary summit (3,121 metres) named Piz Piotta lies north of the summit of Cima Rossa. A small glacier lies between them on the west flanks, named Ghiacciaio di Piotta.
