= Guraletschsee =

Lake in the Grisons, Switzerland

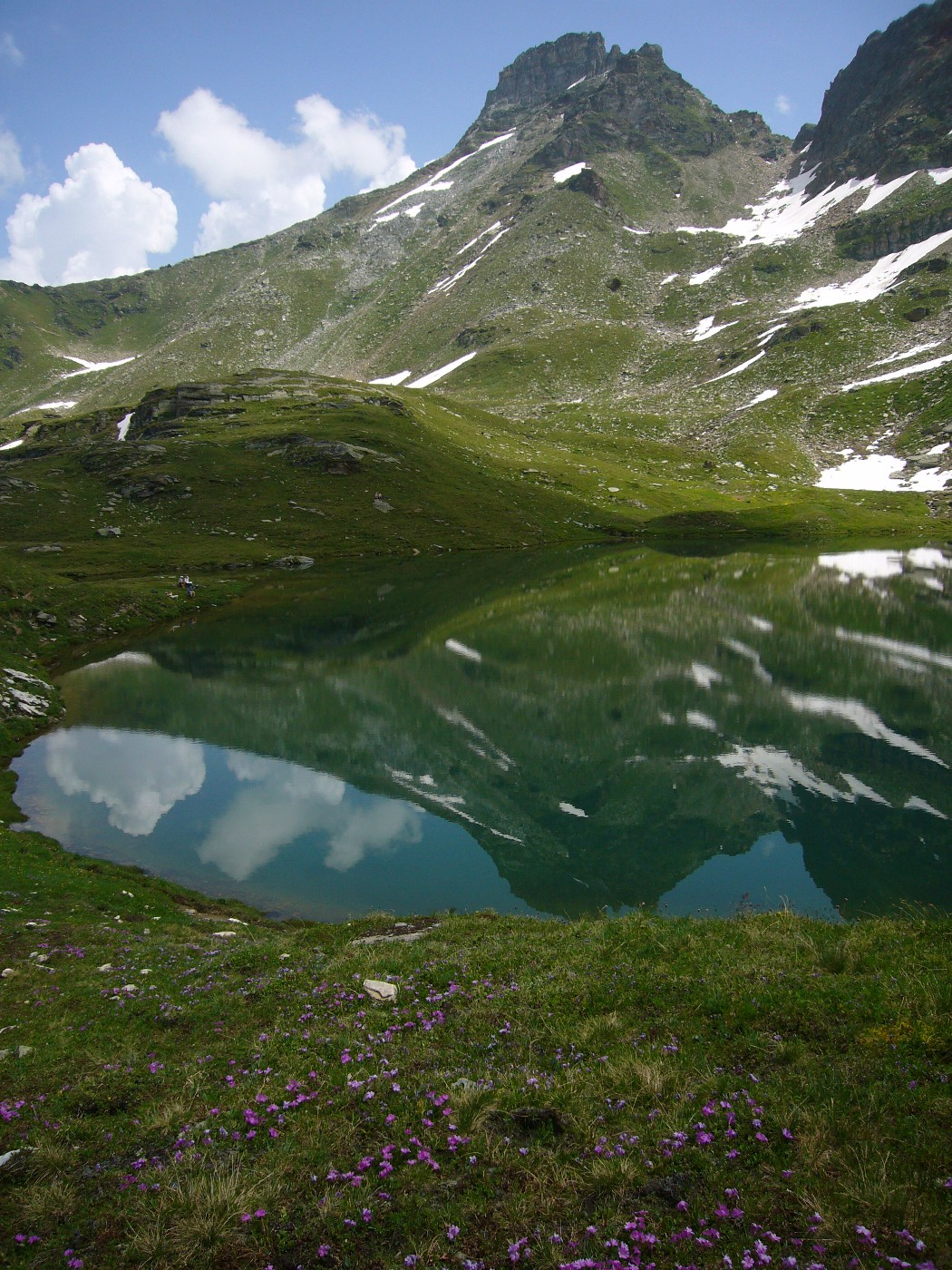
- Lake with Guraletschhorn

- Location within Canton of Graubünden Location within Switzerland Location within Italy Location within Alps
- Interactive map of Guraletschsee
- Location: Vals, Grisons
- Coordinates: 46.561°N 9.1376°E
- Basin countries: Switzerland
- Max. depth: < 20 m (66 ft)
- Surface elevation: 2,409 m (7,904 ft)
- Frozen: December to May
- Islands: none
- Settlements: none

Guraletschsee is a lake above Vals in the canton of Grisons, Switzerland. The lake lies entirely on territory of the municipality of Vals.

The water from the lake runs down north and is suspected to be divertet to Lake Zervreila at the level of its dam.

A popular hike starts at Zervreila, passes the three remote lakes Guraletschsee, Amperveilsee and Selvasee and descends via Selva Alp to Vals. Vals is famous for its spa, designed by Peter Zumthor.

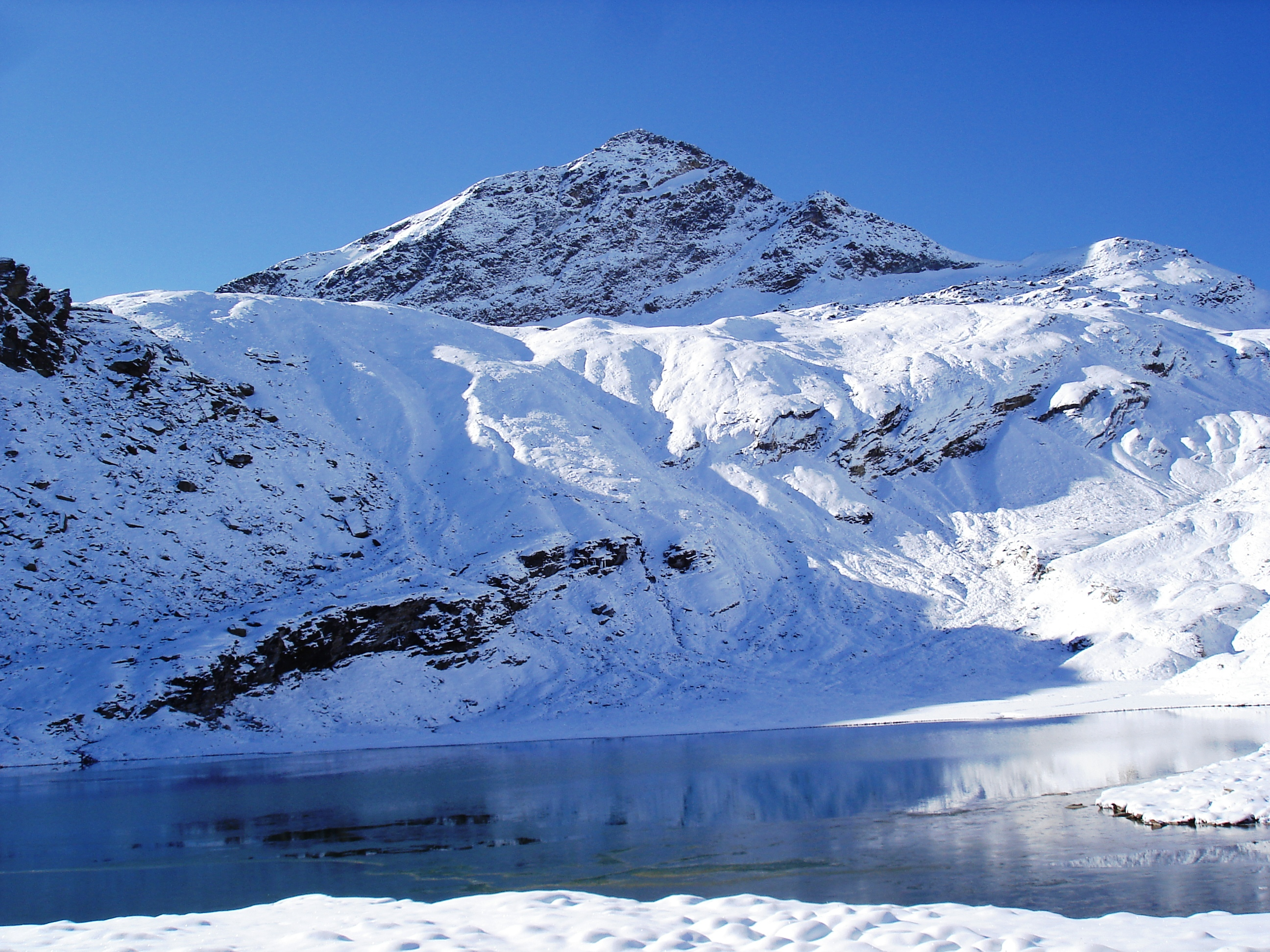
Lake Guraletsch towards Fanellhorn to its south
