= Piz Scharboda =

Mountain in Switzerland

- Location within Switzerland

Highest point
- Elevation: 3,122 m (10,243 ft)
- Prominence: 238 m (781 ft)
- Parent peak: Piz Terri
- Coordinates: 46°34′50.2″N 9°2′59.3″E

Geography
- Location: Graubünden, Switzerland
- Parent range: Lepontine Alps

Piz Scharboda is a mountain of the Swiss Lepontine Alps, overlooking the lake of Zervreila in the canton of Graubünden. It lies south of Piz Terri, near the border with the canton of Ticino.
