= Lago di Luzzone =

Reservoir in Ticino, Switzerland

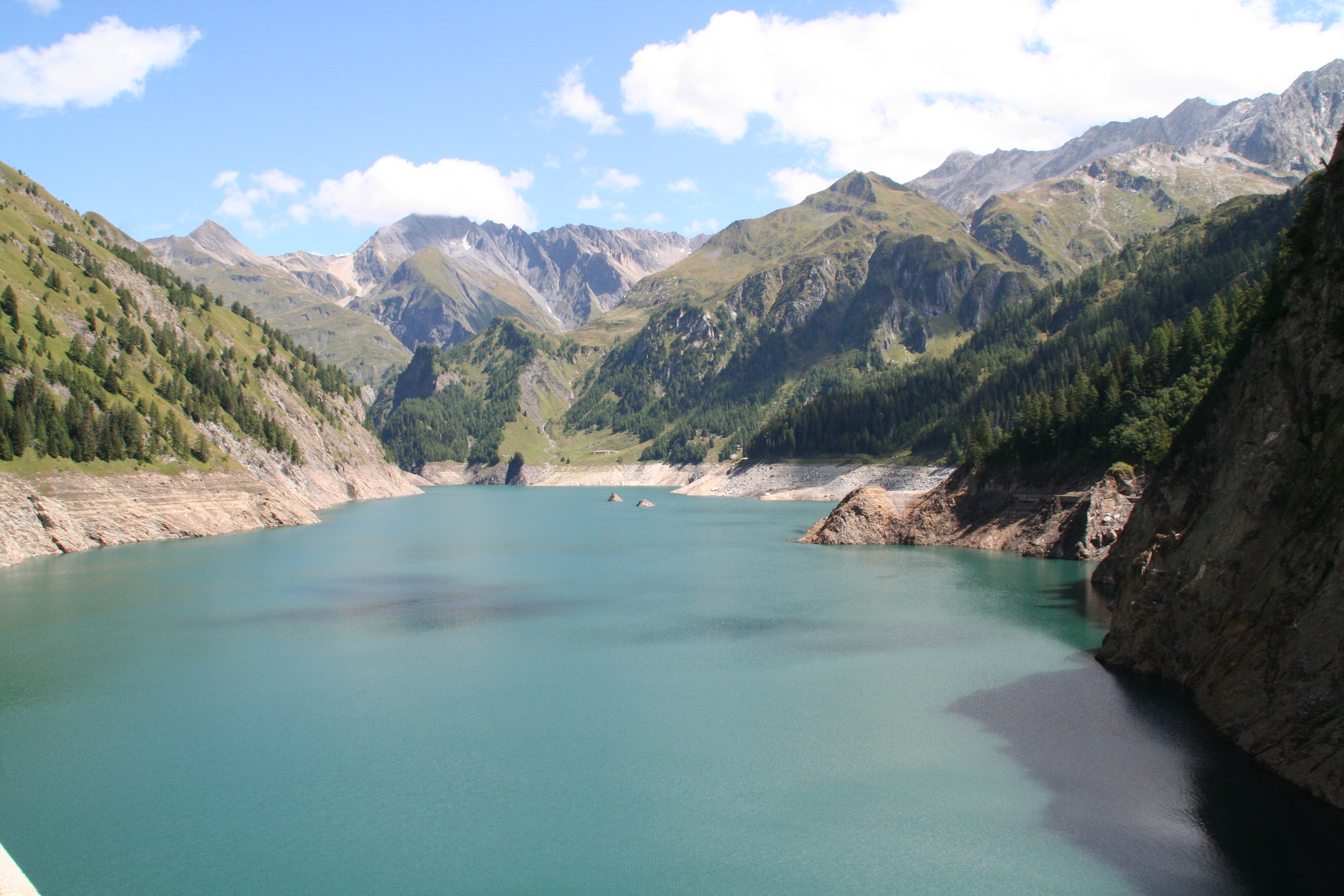
- Looking east

- Location within Canton of Ticino Location within Switzerland Location within Alps
- Interactive map of Lago di Luzzone
- Location: Ticino
- Coordinates: 46°34′3″N 8°58′37″E
- Primary inflows: Ri di Cavalasca, Ri di Garzora, Ri di Scaradra
- Primary outflows: Brenno di Luzzone
- Catchment area: 36.74 km^{2} (14.19 sq mi)
- Basin countries: Switzerland
- Surface area: 1.27 km^{2} (0.49 sq mi)
- Max. depth: 181 m (594 ft)
- Surface elevation: 1,606 m (5,269 ft)

Lago di Luzzone is a reservoir in Ticino, Switzerland. The reservoir has a volume of 108 million m³ and a surface area of 1.27 km^{2} (0.49 sq mi). It is located in the upper Blenio valley, in the municipalities of Ghirone and Aquila.

The reservoir is surrounded by peaks of the Adula Alps, some of which rise more than 3,000 meters, and is located at a height of 1,606 meters above sea level. The highest is Piz Terri (3,149 m), on the north-east side of the lake, followed by the Plattenberg (3,041 m), on the east side. The Torrone di Nav (2,832 m) overlooks the lake from the south, while Pizzo Pianca (2,377 m) overlooks the lake from the north.

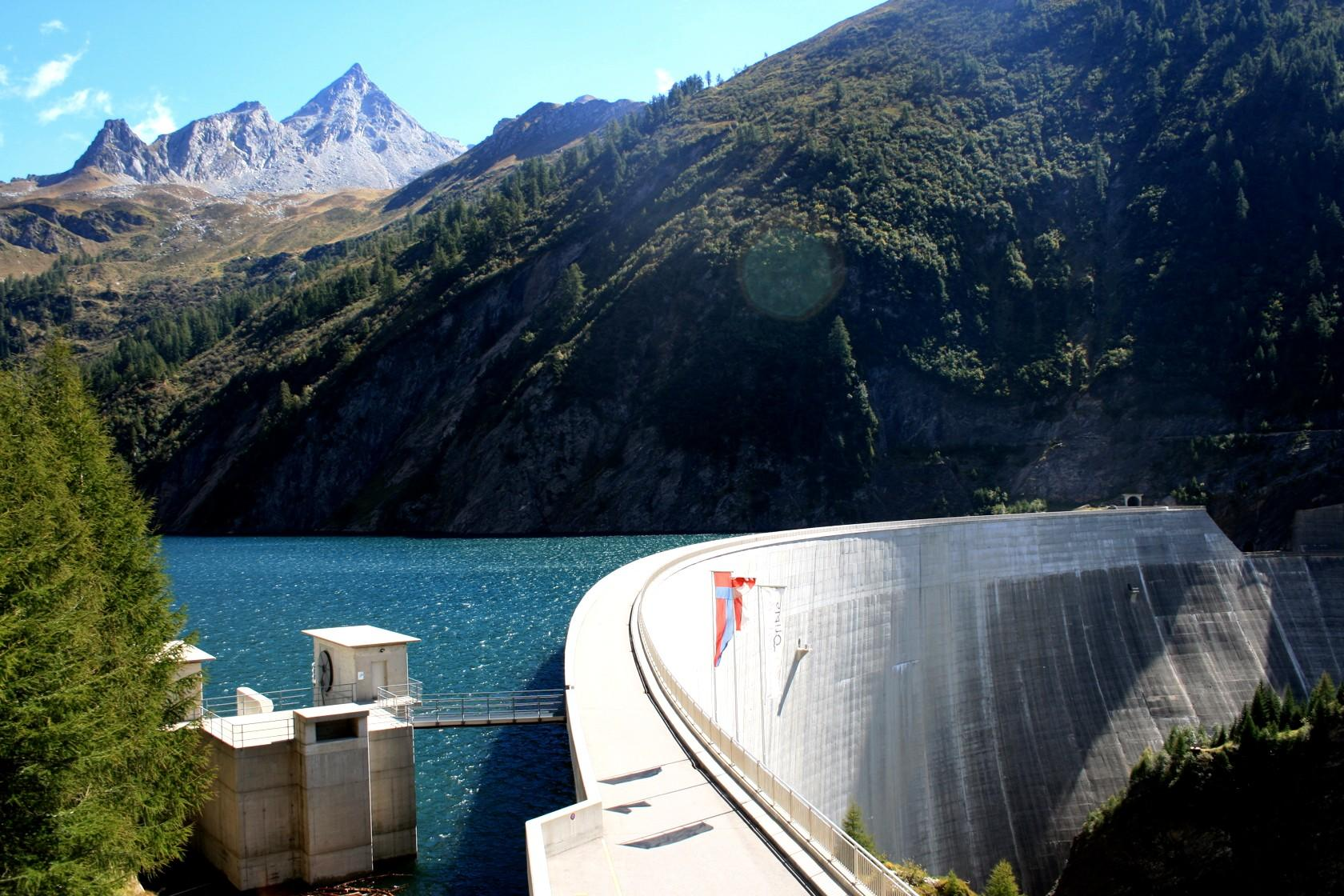
Luzzone arch dam

The arch dam Luzzone was completed in 1963. In the years 1997–1998, its height was increased by 17 m. The dam is frequently used by the popular YouTube channel How Ridiculous to perform drop tests, and a Top Gear episode showed an occupied car doing a bungee jump.

One wall of the dam currently features the world's highest artificial climbing wall. A German manufacturer of climbing holds installed a line of over 650 artificial holds and bolts. The course covers a vertical distance of 165 meters, going from the base of the dam to the top. The climb must be done as a multi-pitch bolted sport climbing route. Furthermore, the lowest holds were placed several meters above the ground to deter casual visitors from climbing on them.

== See also ==
- List of lakes of Switzerland
- List of mountain lakes of Switzerland
