= Paradies Glacier =

Glacier in Switzerland

Coordinates: 46°29′26″N 9°3′18″E

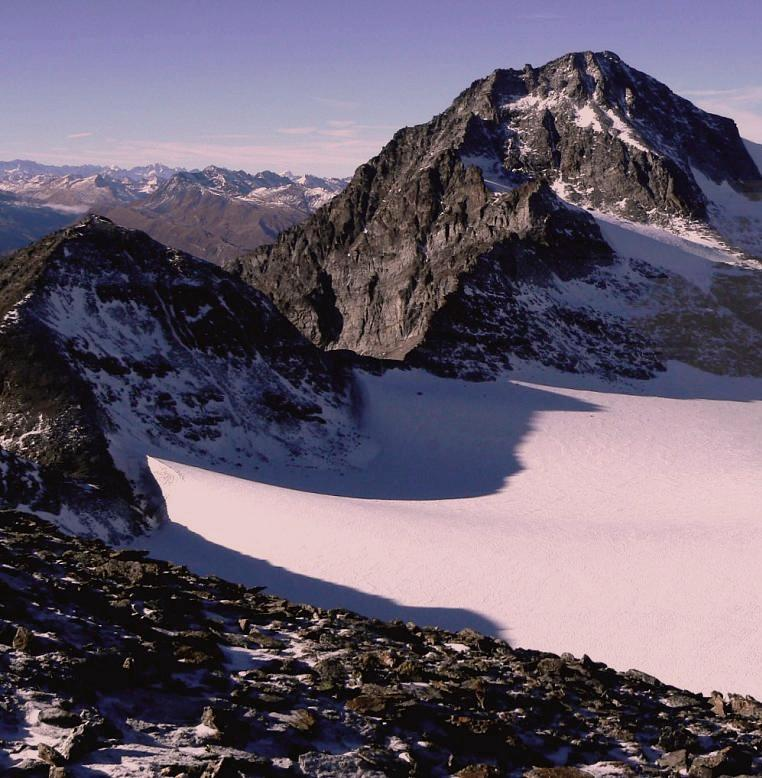
View of the Rheinwaldhorn from the glacier

The Paradies Glacier (German: Paradiesgletscher) is a 2.27 km long glacier (2007) situated in the Lepontine Alps in the canton of Graubünden in Switzerland. In 1973, it had an area of 3.99 km^{2}.

== See also ==
- List of glaciers in Switzerland
- Swiss Alps
