= Amperveilsee =

Lake above Vals in the canton of Grisons, Switzerland

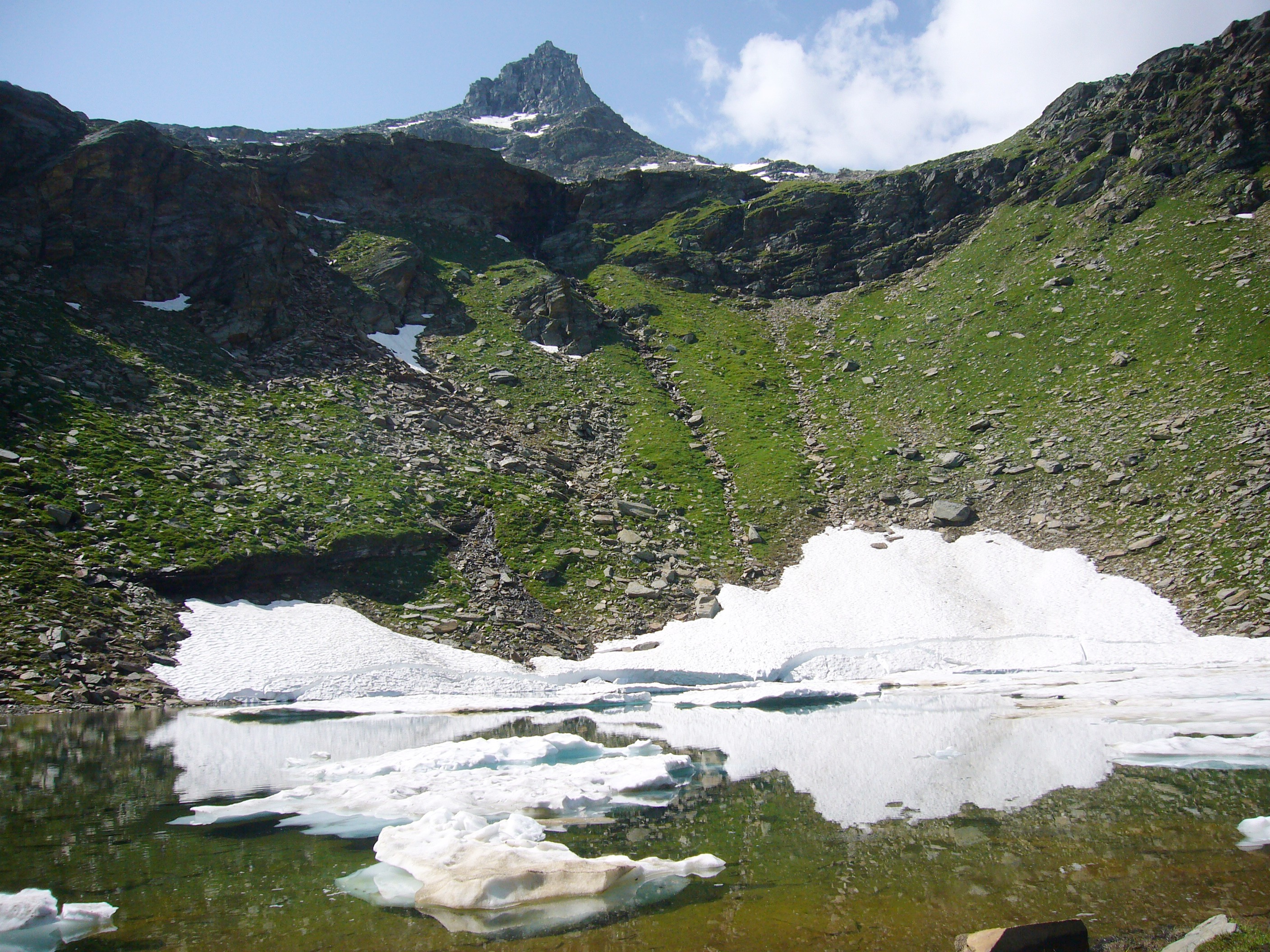
- Lake with Guraletschhorn

- Location within Canton of Graubünden Location within Switzerland Location within Italy Location within Alps
- Interactive map of Amperveilsee
- Location: Vals, Grisons
- Coordinates: 46°34′17″N 9°09′05″E
- Basin countries: Switzerland
- Max. depth: < 20 m (66 ft)
- Surface elevation: 2,375 m (7,792 ft)
- Frozen: December to May
- Islands: none
- Settlements: none

Amperveilsee is a lake above Vals in the canton of Grisons, Switzerland.

A popular hike starts at Zervreila, passes the three remote lakes Guraletschsee, Amperveilsee and Selvasee and descends via Selva Alp to Vals. Vals is famous for its spa.
