= Piz Terri =

Mountain in Switzerland

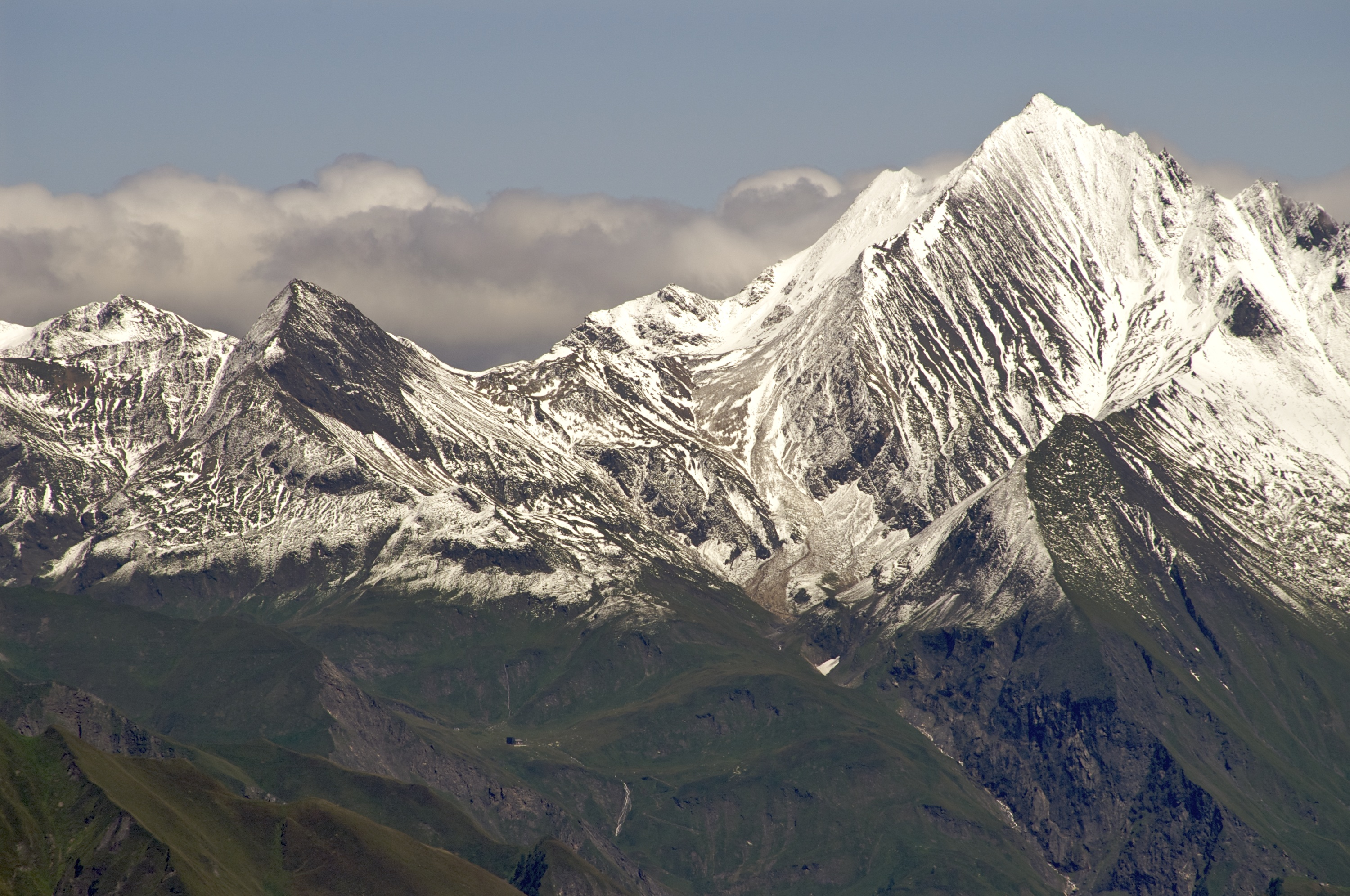
- The south face of Piz Terri (right)

Highest point
- Elevation: 3,149 m (10,331 ft)
- Prominence: 390 m (1,280 ft)
- Parent peak: Rheinwaldhorn
- Listing: Alpine mountains above 3000 m
- Coordinates: 46°36′0″N 9°2′2″E

Geography
- Location within Switzerland
- Location: Graubünden/Ticino, Switzerland
- Parent range: Lepontine Alps

Piz Terri is a mountain in the Lepontine Alps, located on the border between the cantons of Ticino and Graubünden. At 3,149 metres above sea level it is the highest summit lying on the chain between Greina and Soreda Pass. Piz Terri overlooks Lake Luzzone in Val Blenio on its west side, Val Sumvitg on its north side and Lumnezia on its east side. Close localities are Olivone (Val Blenio) and Vrin (Lumnezia).

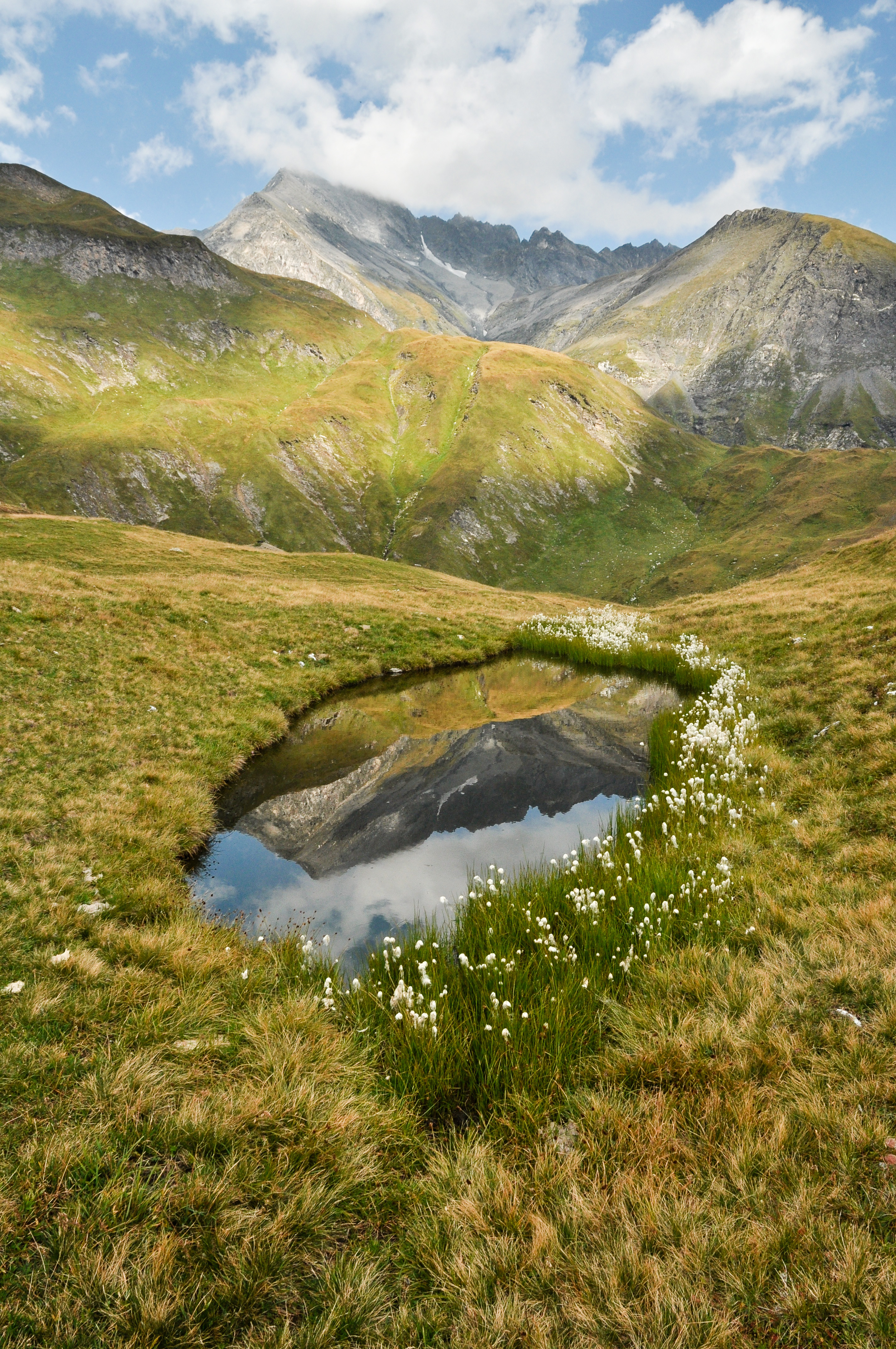
Piz Terri from Alp Motterascio

The lake named Laghet la Greina (0.183 km²) is located not far from the summit, on the northwest side of the mountain, at an elevation of 2,585 metres. The faces are steep. Only a small glacier, named Glatscher dil Terri, lies at the base of the north face. It previously extended down to the lake.

The summit can be reached by experienced hikers via a trail on the west ridge. The normal route starts above Lake Luzzone at the Motterascio hut (2,171 metres), owned by the Swiss Alpine Club.
