= Zervreilasee =

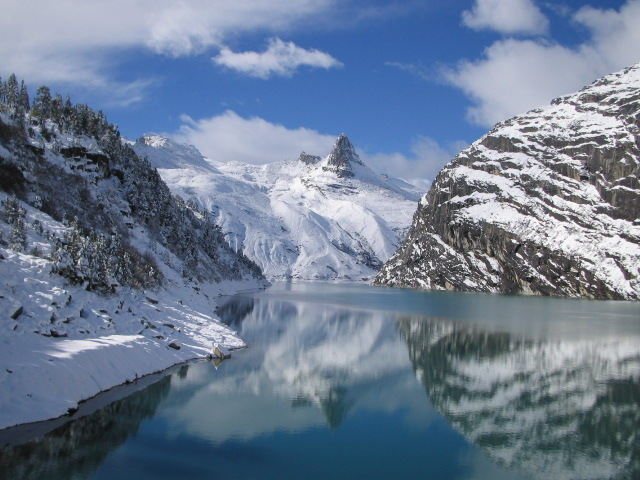

- Location within Canton of Graubünden Location within Switzerland Location within Italy Location within Alps
- Interactive map of Zervreilasee
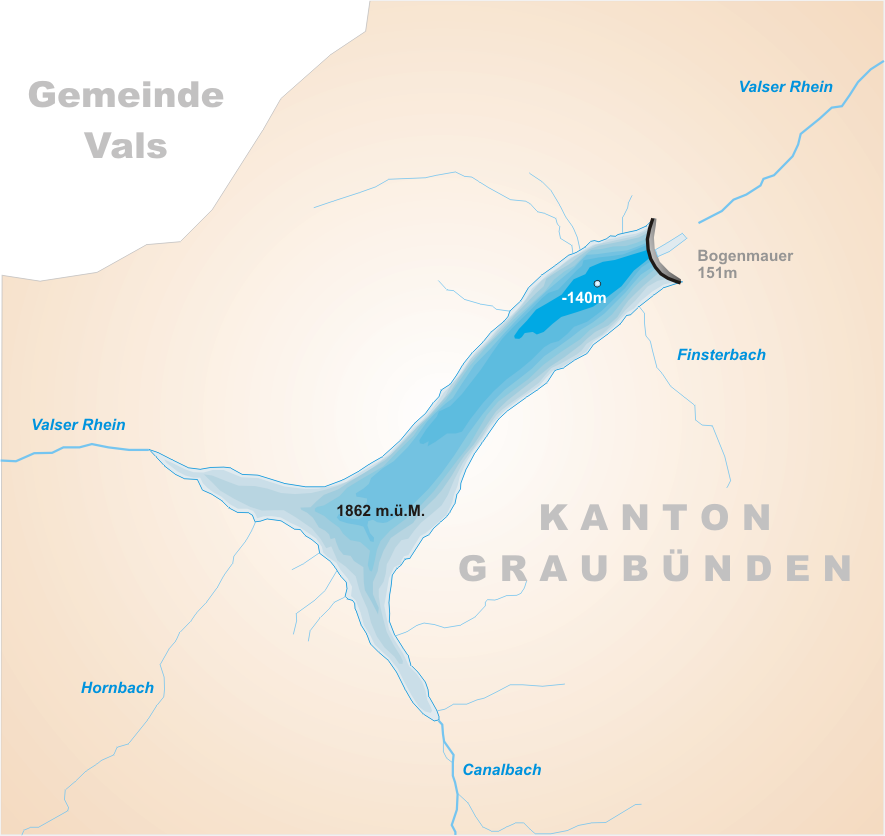
- Location: Vals, Graubünden
- Coordinates: 46°33′57″N 9°5′52″E
- Type: reservoir
- Primary inflows: Valser Rhein, Hornbach, Canalbach
- Primary outflows: Valser Rhein
- Catchment area: 63.9 km^{2} (24.7 sq mi)
- Basin countries: Switzerland
- Surface area: 1.61 km^{2} (0.62 sq mi)
- Max. depth: 140 m (460 ft)
- Water volume: 101 million cubic metres (82,000 acre⋅ft)
- Surface elevation: 1,862 m (6,109 ft)

Zervreilasee is a reservoir located south-west of Vals in the canton of Graubünden, Switzerland.

== Geography ==
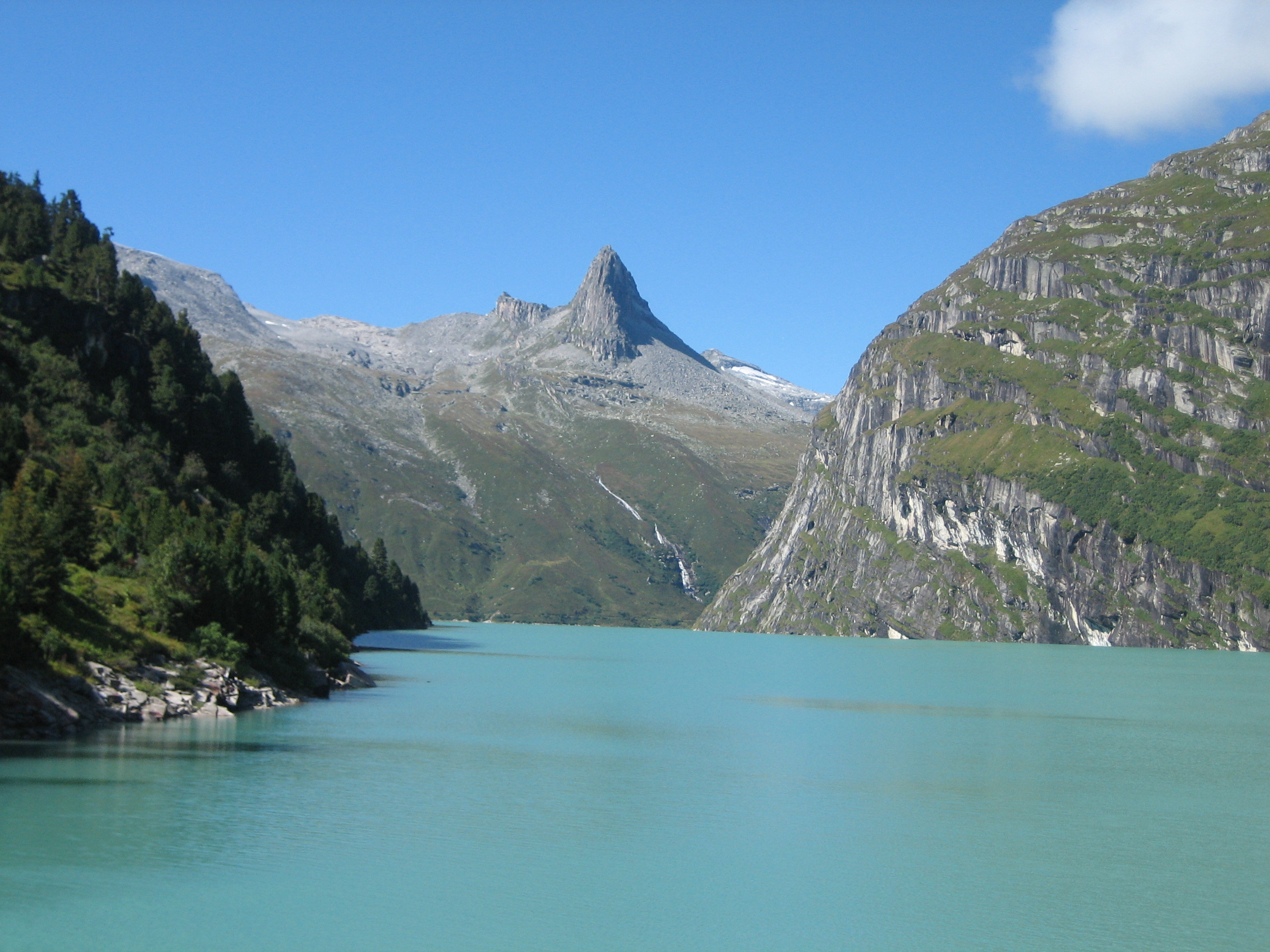
View of the lake with the Zervreilahorn

The lake has a surface area of 1.61 km² and an elevation of 1,862 m. The maximum depth is 140 m. The dam is 151 m high and was completed in 1957. The village of Zervreila was flooded after the construction of the dam. A 150-metre-long bridge (Canalbrücke) crosses the southern bay of the lake.

The Zervreilasee, located near the upper end of the Valser Tal, is surrounded by peaks of the Adula Alps, some rising to over 3,000 metres. The highest visible from the lake is the Güferhorn (3,379 m), located on the south side. Other peaks are the Fanellhorn (3,124 m), the Frunthorn (3,030 m), Piz Scharboda (3,122 m), the Plattenberg (3,041 m) and the Furggeltihorn (3,043 m). The Zervreilahorn is a sharp peak overlooking the lake from its south-west side.

== See also ==
- List of lakes of Switzerland
- List of mountain lakes of Switzerland
