= Rheinwaldhorn =

Mountain in Switzerland

- Adula
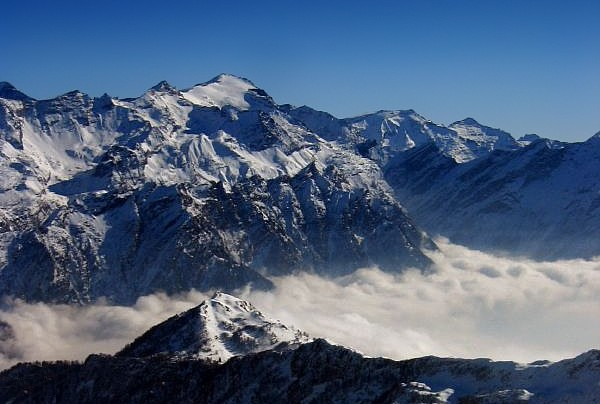
- Rheinwaldhorn, February 2006

Highest point
- Elevation: 3,402 m (11,161 ft)
- Prominence: 1,337 m (4,386 ft)
- Parent peak: Piz Kesch
- Isolation: 35.1 km (21.8 mi)
- Listing: Canton high point, Alpine mountains above 3000 m
- Coordinates: 46°29′37″N 9°02′24″E

Geography
- Location within Switzerland
- Location: Ticino, Graubünden; Switzerland
- Parent range: Lepontine Alps

Climbing
- First ascent: 1789 by Placidus a Spescha

The Rheinwaldhorn (Italian: Adula) is the highest point in the Swiss canton of Ticino at 3,402 metres above sea level. It lies on the border between the cantons of Graubünden and Ticino, in the Adula massif, part of the St. Gotthard massif of the Adula Alps in southern Switzerland.

The mountain is known by different names, in German as Rheinwaldhorn or Adulahorn, in Italian as l'Adula or Piz Valrhein, in Romansh as Piz Valragn. The group of the snowy peaks lying between the two principal branches of the Rhine were known in the Middle Ages by the names Mons Aquila or Mons Avium. From the Romansh form of the first comes the name Adula, which is used to designate the north-eastern portion of the Lepontine Alps. The German name "Rheinwaldhorn" comes from the Rheinwald region.

== Geography ==
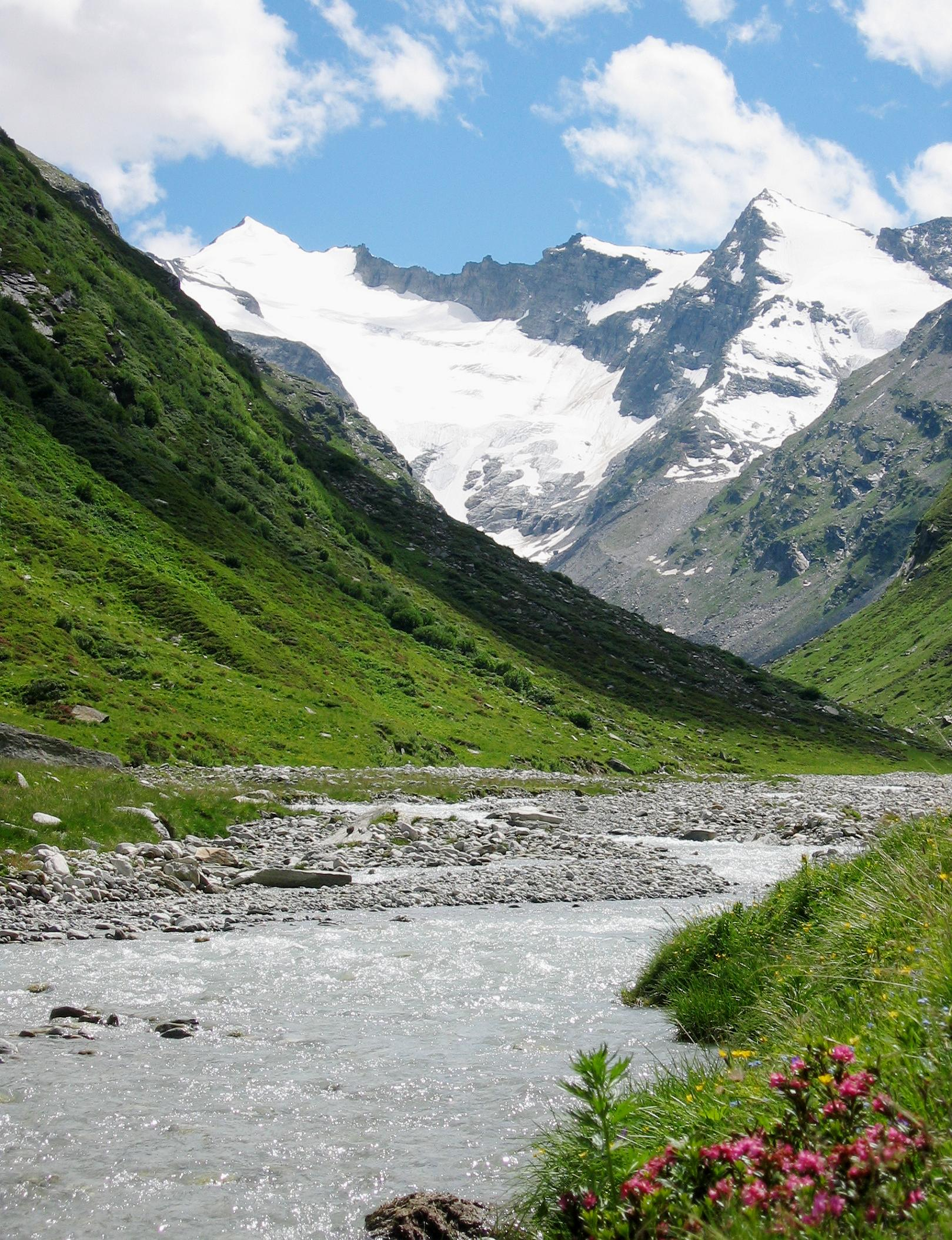
The Rheinwaldhorn (left) seen from south of Vals

The Rheinwaldhorn is the culminating point of the eastern portion of the Lepontine Alps and the Adula group. In this area, the watershed between the Rhine and the Po river has no determinate direction, and exhibits a dislocated appearance. The peaks of the Adula form an irregular group, all the highest lying in a cluster not more five kilometres distant from the centre, which may be fixed as the foot of the Rheinwald Glacier. From the central group a considerable range extends due south more than 15 kilometres, between Val Blenio and Val Calanca, gradually diminishing in height. A parallel ridge connected with the main massif divides the Val Calanca from Val Mesocco; it surpasses but in a few points the height of 9,000 feet. The northern ridge, longer but less regular than the first-mentioned, extends fully 20 kilometres, from the central group to the Piz Nadils over Sumvitg in the valley of the Vorderrhein.

The valleys on the north-east side are significantly higher than those on the south-west side. About 7 km west of the Rheinwaldhorn are the localities of Dangio and Torre (Ticino), at around 800 metres above sel level. About 13 km east of the summit is the locality of Hinterrhein (Graubünden), at around 1,600 metres.

Politically, the summit of the Rheinwaldhorn is split between two cantons and three municipalities. On the west side is the municipality of Blenio (Ticino) and on the east side are the municipalities of Vals and Hinterrhein (Graubünden).

== Climbing history ==
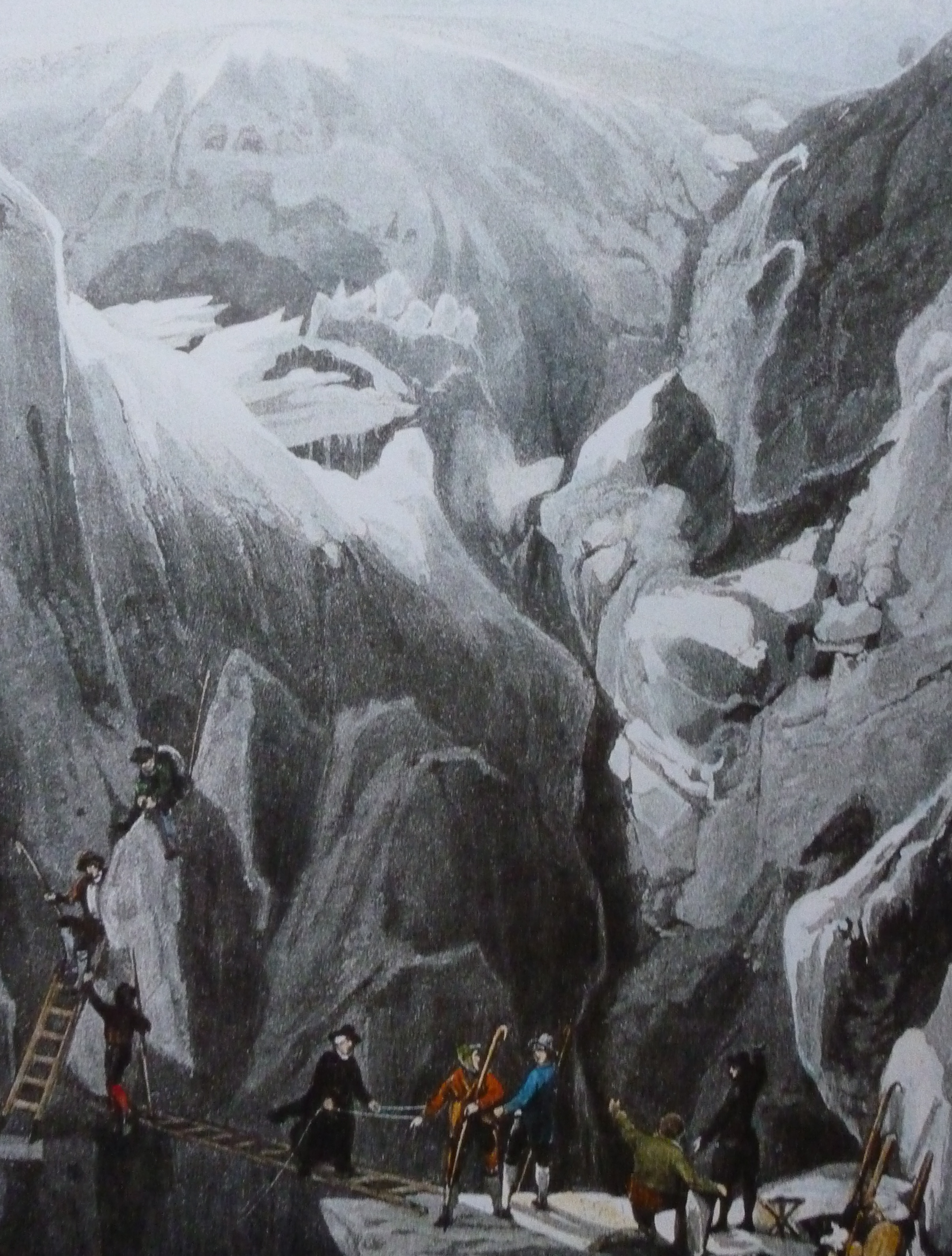
The ascent by Placidus a Spescha

The summit of the Rheinwaldhorn was first reached in 1789 by Placidus a Spescha. For seventy years no attempts seems to have been made to repeat the ascent. In 1859, Weilenmann reached the summit alone. The next and third recorded ascent was made in 1861 by Coaz (a topographer who made the first ascent of Piz Bernina), with three companions, and a chamois-hunter named Peter Anton Jellier, of Vals. Coaz gave an account of the expedition in the Jahresbericht der Naturforschenden Gesellschaft Graubünden. Sleeping at the Zapport Alps, they mounted to the spot named Paradies, located below the Paradies Glacier. A faint sheep-tract was followed for some distance: they then took to the glacier, but after some time returned to its southern bank. The first stage of the ascent was completed when they gained the col (Lenta Pass) in the ridge between the Rheinwaldhorn and Güferhorn. From thence the way lay along the arête. This was very narrow, and in some places difficult, where steep rocks projected through the névé. After overcoming the rocks, the travellers found the ridge wider, but also much steeper than below, and to reach the highest point it was necessary to wind round the north side of the peak, so that the final climb was made from the north-west. The summit is a ridge about 200 feet long, running from north to south, and in one part bare of snow. Here in the two following ascents were found some remains of the cairn erected there seventy years before by Placidus a Spescha.

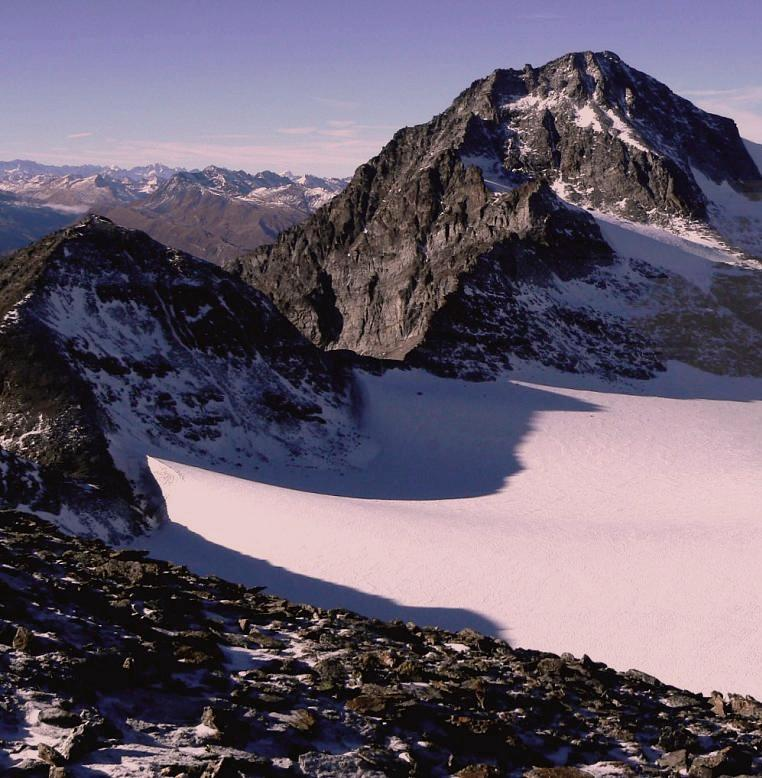
The Rheinwaldhorn seen from the Paradies Glacier

The peaks of the Adula group had not been frequented by foreign travellers until 1863, when Morshead made the first ascent of the Vogelberg. In the following year Freshfield, with two friends, reached the summit of the Rheinwaldhorn from the side of the Lenta Glacier, striking the shoulder of the peak above the lowest point in the ridge connecting it with the Güferhorn.

The first winter solo ascent was made by Daniele Gianora in 1942.

== See also ==
- Nature parks in Switzerland
- List of mountains of Ticino
- List of mountains of Switzerland
