= Vals, Switzerland =

Vals
- Municipality
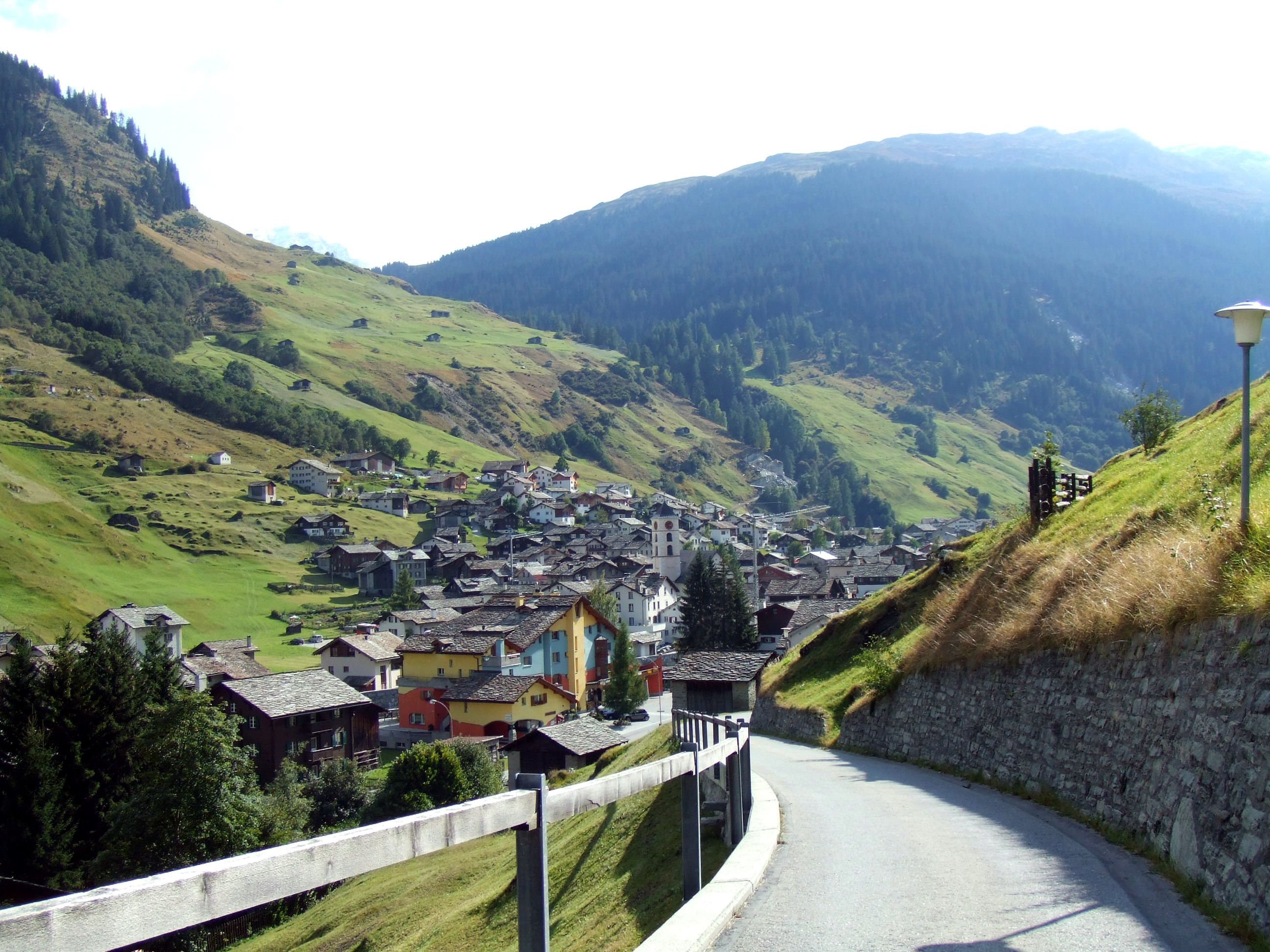

- Flag Coat of arms
- Location of Vals
- Location within Switzerland Location within Canton of Grisons
- Coordinates: 46°37′N 9°11′E
- Country: Switzerland
- Canton: Grisons
- District: Surselva

Area
  - Total: 152.58 km^{2} (58.91 sq mi)
- Elevation: 1,252 m (4,108 ft)

Population (December 2020)
  - Total: 946
  - Density: 6.20/km^{2} (16.1/sq mi)
- Time zone: UTC+01:00 (CET)
  - Summer (DST): UTC+02:00 (CEST)
- Postal code: 7132
- SFOS number: 3603
- ISO 3166 code: CH-GR
- Surrounded by: Blenio (TI), Hinterrhein, Lumbrein, Nufenen, Safien, Vrin
- Website: www.vals.ch

Vals (locally pronounced [ˈvals]) is a village and a municipality in the Surselva Region in the canton of the Grisons in Switzerland. On 1 January 2015 the former municipality of St. Martin merged into the municipality of Vals.

== History ==
=== Vals ===
Aerial view from 4000 m by Walter Mittelholzer (1919)

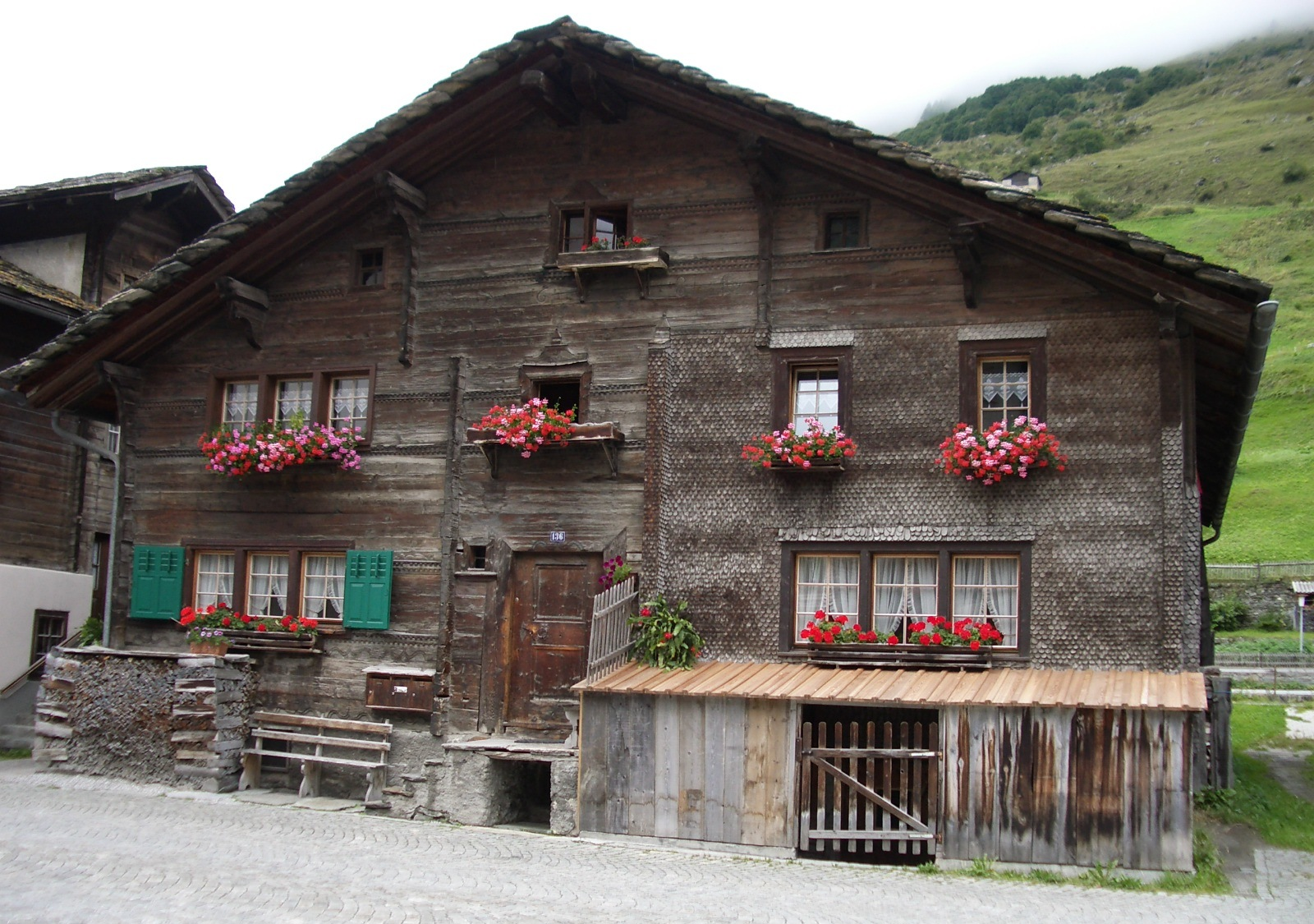
Walser house

Archeological finds from the Bronze Age around the thermal baths and Tomül pass as well as Iron Age items on the slopes of the Valserberg indicate that this area was used before written history. In the 11th and 12th centuries the Valser valley was extensively used by the local Romansh. Vals is first mentioned in mid 12th century as in Valle. About 1290 they were 4 to 7 farm houses with flocks of sheep.

In the 13th century, the Walser were driven from the canton of Wallis in south-west Switzerland into the Valser valley. The expansion of the Walliser German speaking Walser stopped in 1457 when they were forbidden from marrying or buying land from the Romansh speaking locals. They were able to settle at the end of the valley because that was the only place that wasn't claimed. The Walser also brought with them the Valliser style of house, which uses more wood than stone and has triangular roofs.

=== St. Martin ===
The village was settled around the 14th century by Walser immigrants. Initially it was a held in fief for the Bishop of Chur by the von Tersnaus and von Mont families. In 1457 the German-speaking population was forbidden from purchasing land or marrying in the neighboring village of Tersnaus. The village church (consecrated 1345) was initially under the parish church of St. Vinzenz in Pleif (in Vella municipality), but in 1528 came under the authority of Tersnaus. After 1776, St. Martin's village church had a German-speaking Prebend though in 1868 it fell back under the authority of Tersnaus.

By 1671 the farm houses of St. Martin's were a neighborhood in Tersnaus, and in 1878 the municipality separated from Tersnaus to become politically independent. The municipality remained firmly rural, and in 1972–73 became the last municipality in Switzerland to be connected to the electric grid.

== Coat of arms ==
The municipal coat of arms is described as Per fess Or a bend couped embattled bretesse Sable and of the second a Key in bend wards inwards of the first. The key represents Saint Peter who was on the old municipal seal while the cross shape represents the rights of the barons of Belmont.

== Geography ==
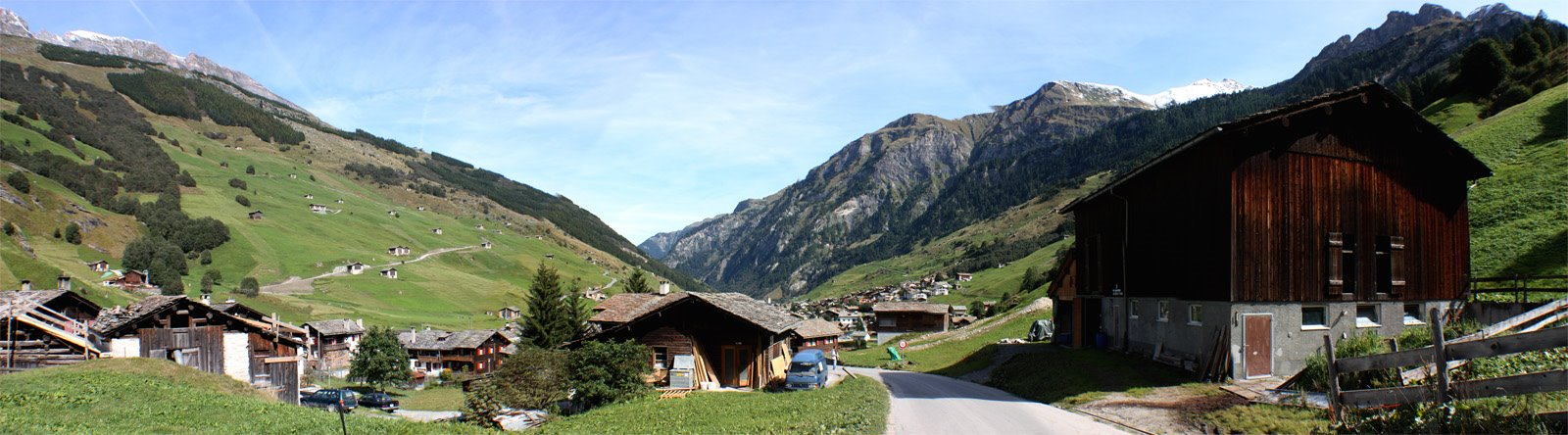
Panorama of Vals

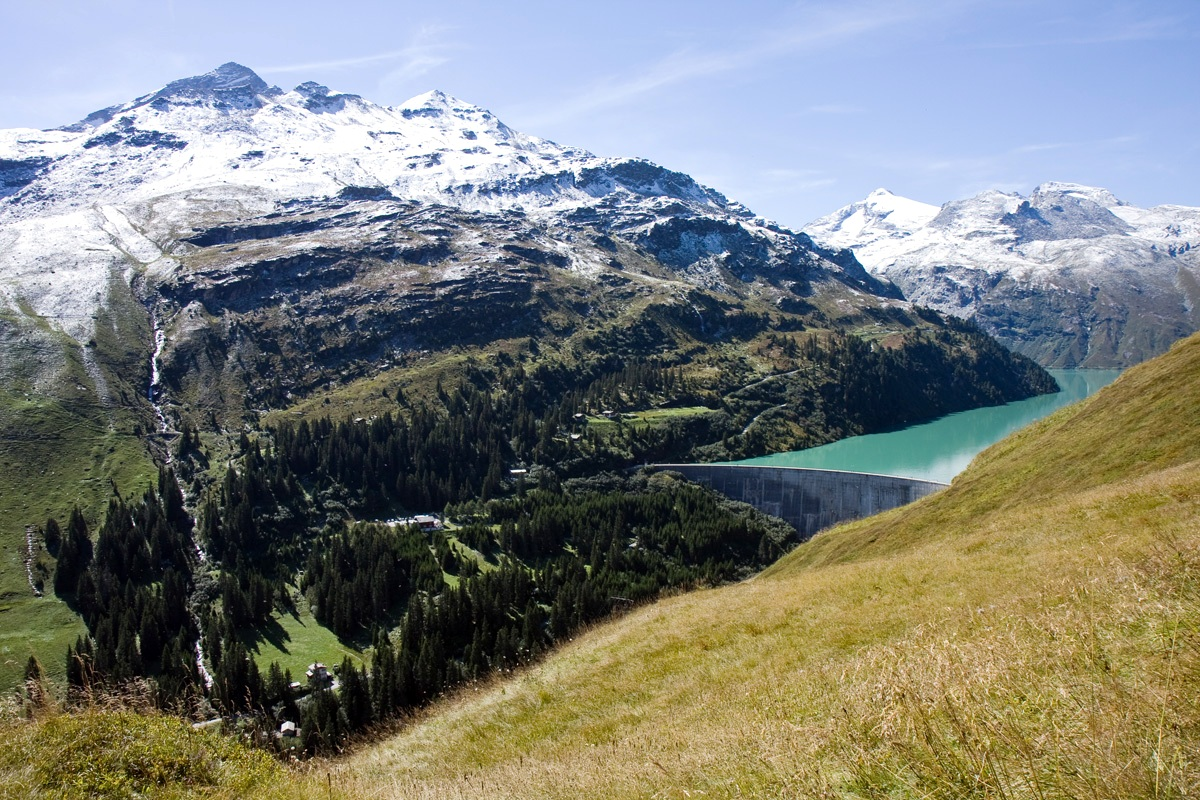
Zervreilasee

Based on the 2009 survey, the former municipalities that make up Vals had an area of 175.56 km^{2} (67.78 sq mi). Of this area, 56.44 km^{2} (21.79 mi^{2}) or 32.1% was used for agricultural purposes, while 21.48 km^{2} (8.29 mi^{2}) or 12.2% was forested. Of the rest of the land, 0.99 km^{2} (0.38 mi^{2}) or 0.6% was settled (buildings or roads), 3.78 km^{2} (1.46 mi^{2}) or 2.2% was either rivers or lakes and 92.82 km^{2} (35.84 mi^{2}) or 52.9% was unproductive land.

Of the built up area, housing and buildings made up 0.2% and transportation infrastructure made up 0.3%. Out of the forested land, all of the forested land area is covered with heavy forests. Of the agricultural land, 1.7% is pastures and 30.4% is used for alpine pastures. Of the water in the municipality, 1.0% is in lakes and 1.1% is in rivers and streams. Of the unproductive areas, 23.0% is unproductive vegetation, 26.9% is too rocky for vegetation and 3.0% of the land is covered by glaciers.

Before the merger Vals had an area, as of 2006, of 152.6 km^{2} (58.9 sq mi). Of this area, 34.1% was used for agricultural purposes, while 7.9% was forested. Of the rest of the land, 0.5% was settled (buildings or roads) and the remainder (57.4%) was non-productive (rivers, glaciers or mountains).

Before 2017, the municipality was located in the Lugnez sub-district of the Surselva district, after 2017 it was part of the Surselva Region. It consists of the village of Vals at an elevation of 1,252 m (4,108 ft) and the hamlets of Leis at an elevation of 1,526 m (5,007 ft)). The highest point of the municipality is reached on Rheinwaldhorn on 3,402 m (11,161 ft).

Zervreilasee is a reservoir in the valley, formed by a dam on the Vals Rhine.

== Demographics ==
Vals has a population (as of 31 December 2020) of 946. As of 2008, 10.8% of the population was made up of foreign nationals. Over the last 10 years the population has grown at a rate of 1.4%. Most of the population (as of 2000) speaks German (94.4%), with Romansh being second most common (2.3%) and Italian being third (0.8%).

As of 2000, the gender distribution of the population was 49.2% male and 50.8% female. The age distribution, as of 2000, in Vals is; 94 children or 10.6% of the population are between 0 and 9 years old and 93 teenagers or 10.5% are between 10 and 19. Of the adult population, 88 people or 9.9% of the population are between 20 and 29 years old. 114 people or 12.9% are between 30 and 39, 127 people or 14.4% are between 40 and 49, and 115 people or 13.0% are between 50 and 59. The senior population distribution is 104 people or 11.8% of the population are between 60 and 69 years old, 105 people or 11.9% are between 70 and 79, there are 40 people or 4.5% who are between 80 and 89, and there are 5 people or 0.6% who are between 90 and 99.

In the 2007 federal election the most popular party was the CVP which received 63.9% of the vote. The next three most popular parties were the SVP (19.8%), the SP (11.6%) and the FDP (3.9%).

In Vals about 70.3% of the population (between age 25 and 64) have completed either non-mandatory upper secondary education or additional higher education (either university or a Fachhochschule).

Vals has an unemployment rate of 1.08%. As of 2005, there were 75 people employed in the primary economic sector and about 30 businesses involved in this sector. 166 people are employed in the secondary sector and there are 15 businesses in this sector. 338 people are employed in the tertiary sector, with 41 businesses in this sector.

== Historic population ==
The historical population is given in the following chart:

== Tourism ==
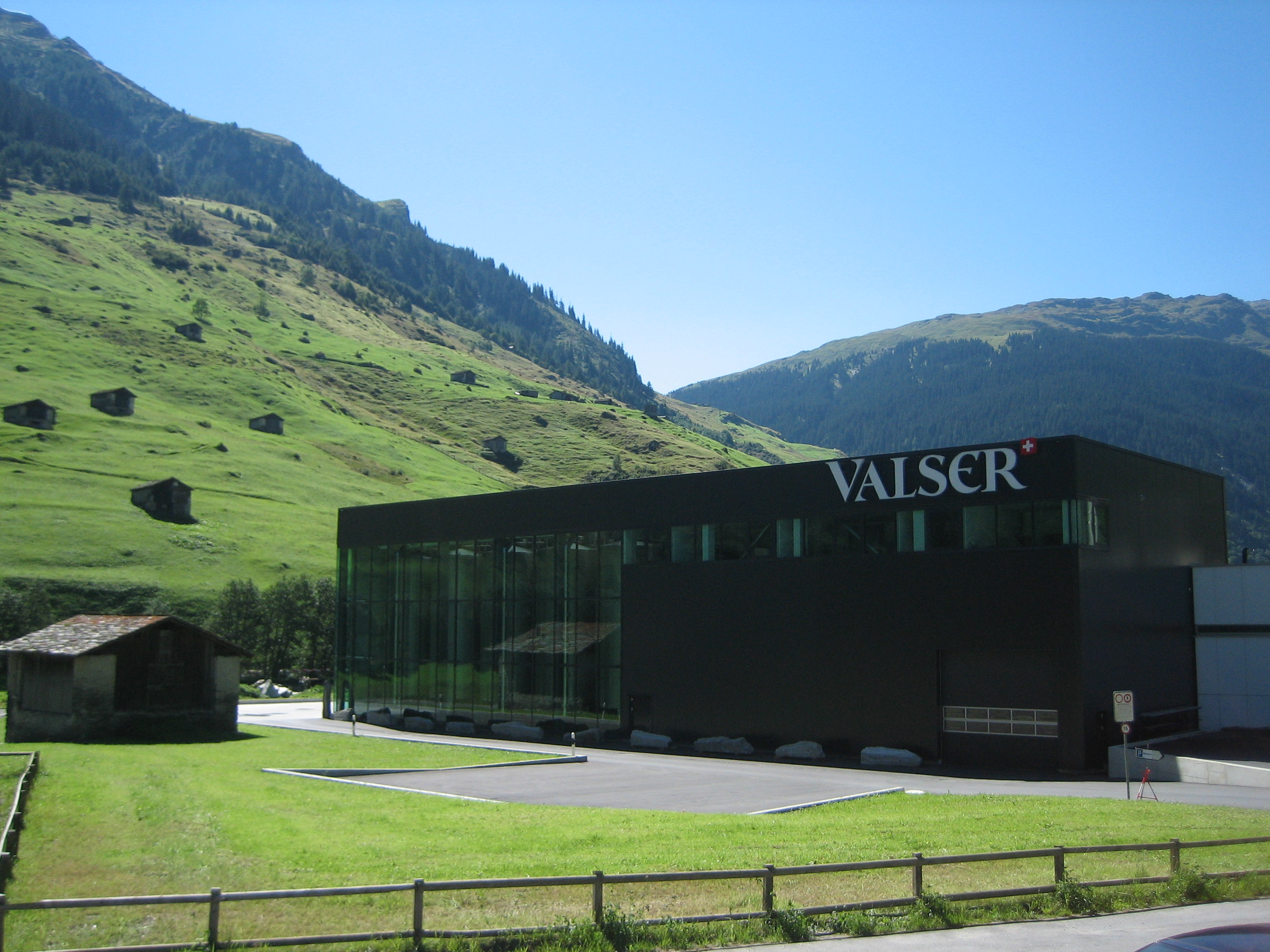
Valser building

Located in the Vals Valley, it is known for its thermal baths (Therme Vals). It is the source of the Valser mineral water and Valserstein, a granite with many minerals in it giving it a sparkle.

== Weather ==
Vals has an average of 121.1 days of rain per year and on average receives 1,185 mm (46.7 in) of precipitation. The wettest month is August during which time Vals receives an average of 144 mm (5.7 in) of precipitation. During this month there is precipitation for an average of 12.6 days. The month with the most days of precipitation is May, with an average of 12.8, but with only 129 mm (5.1 in) of precipitation. The driest month of the year is January with an average of 55 mm (2.2 in) of precipitation over 12.6 days.

== Heritage sites of national significance ==
The double house at Nr. 81 is listed as a Swiss heritage site of national significance.
