= Alpe Veglia and Alpe Devero Natural Park =

Nature park in Italy

Coordinates: 46.2705°N 8.1429°E

Parco naturale dell'Alpe Veglia e dell'Alpe Devero
- IUCN category V (protected landscape/seascape)
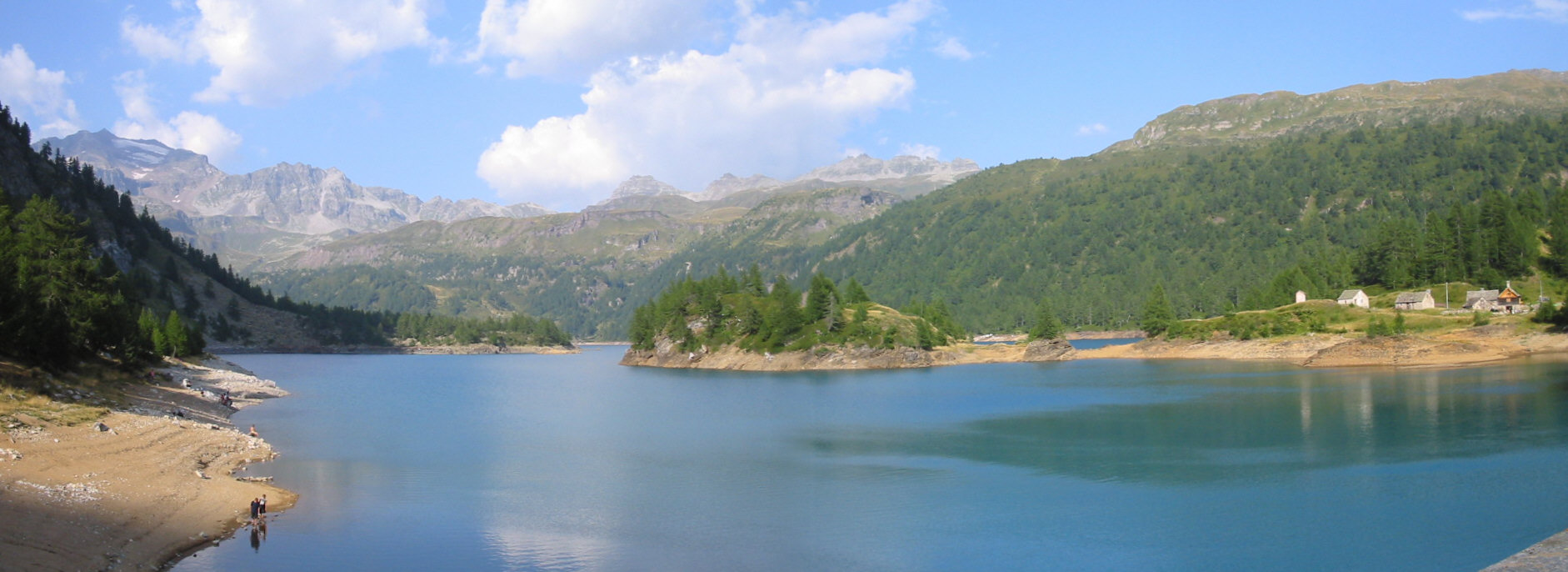
- Location: Piedmont
- Nearest city: Domodossola
- Area: 8,539 hectares
- Established: 1995
- Governing body: Ente di Gestione delle Aree Protette dell'Ossola

The Alpe Veglia and Alpe Devero Natural Park was established in 1995 and is in the Ossola valley, in the Province of Verbania, Piedmont, Italy. It is part of the Western Alps.

== History ==
The hollows are geologically and mineralogically interesting, since they testify long period geological process: the presence of remainders of ancient glacier such as the Ghiacciaio del Leone, the Ghiacciaio d'Aurona dall'alpe Veglia or the Ghiacciaio della Rossa prove the glacial origin of the hollows.

The mineralogy is interesting: there are asbecasite, cafarsite and cervandonite.

== Establishment of the park ==
The park has been established with the L.R. n. 32 on 14 March 1995 joining two already existing parks:

=== Alpe Veglia Nature Park ===
The Alpe Veglia Nature Park was the first regional park, established in 1978 (L.R. 14/78) on the Italian side of the Alpe Veglia at an altitude of 1750 m. It was 4120 hectares wide including the municipalities of Varzo and Trasquera, adjoining the Canton of Valais in Switzerland.

=== Alpe Devero Nature Park ===
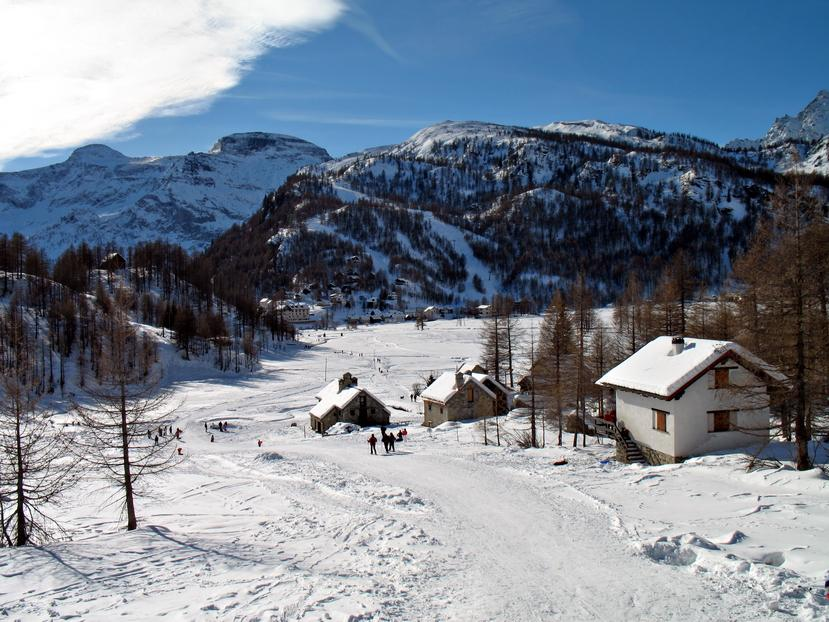
Devero in winter

The Alpe Devero Nature Park was established in 1990 (L.R. 49/90) in order to protect the alpine environment on the Italian side of the Lepontine Alps.

The Alpe Devero is in the Baceno municipality.

=== SCI and SPA ===
The Alpe Devero has been established as Special Protection Area (SPA) in the Natura 2000 network.

Both Alpe Veglia and Devero have been proposed as Site of Community Importance in 1995.

== Territory ==
The area include two wide U-shaped valleys.

The Alpe Veglia is surrounded by Helsenhorn (3.272 m), Hillehorn (3.156 m), Bortelhorn (3.192 m), Punta d'Aurona (2.984), Wasenhorn (3.246 m) and monte Leone (3.553 m). Every mountain has its ows glacier.

The Alpe Devero is surrounded by Ofenhorn (3.235 m), Albrunhorn (2.840 m), Punta Valdeserta (2.939 m), Punta della Rossa (2.888 m), Schwarzhorn (3.108 m), Scherbadung (3.155 m) and Pizzo Cornera (3.083 m).

This area has been exploited by the locals ever since the Middle Ages, who have since affected the landscape, increasing the arable area by limiting the growth of blueberries and rhododendrons.

== Municipalities ==
- Baceno,
- Crodo,
- Trasquera,
- Varzo.

== Flora ==
The flora is homogeneous, but the main tree is the larch. Throughout the whole park larchwoods and some alderwood can be seen. Above 2000 m altitude there are mostly Rhododendron and dwarf shrub nourishing insects such as honey bees, wasps, bumblebees and flies. It is possible to spot Picea abies, but they are very rare.

== Fauna ==
The fauna of the park is mostly composed by typical alpine animals, such as steinbock, Red deer, Roe deer, chamois, fox, red squirrel, Eastern gray squirrel, Golden eagle, European badger, marmots, white hare and many others. In the lakes or rivers there are different fishes such as trouts and graylings; while between the most common birds there are eagles, common buzzards, hawks, different types of owls, and others.

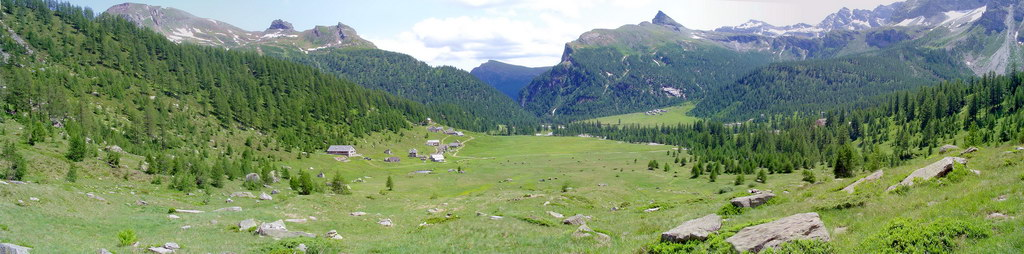
View of the Alpe Veglia

== See also ==
- CoEur - In the heart of European paths
- Lake d'Avino
