= Monte Cazzola =

Mountain in Italy

Coordinates: 46°17′42″N 8°14′15″E

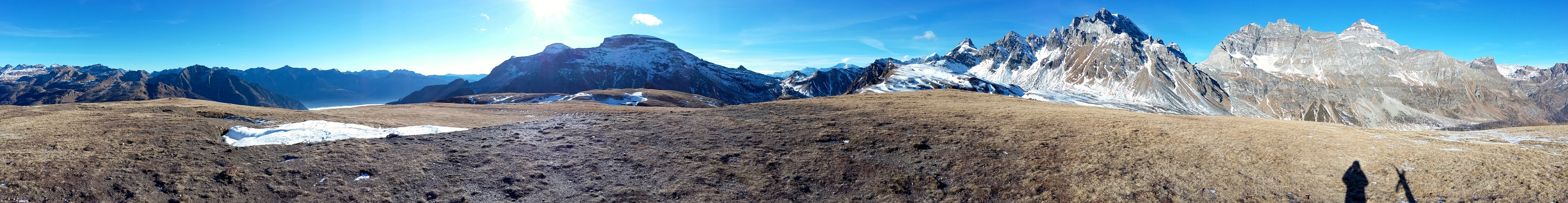
- Panorama from the peak of Monte Cazzola

Highest point
- Elevation: 2,330 m (7,640 ft)

Geography
- Location: Piedmont, Italy
- Parent range: Lepontine Alps

Monte Cazzola is a mountain of Piedmont, Italy, with an elevation of 2,330 metres (7,644 ft). Part of the Lepontine Alps, it is located in the Valle Devero, inside the Alpe Veglia and Alpe Devero Natural Park.

The peak, an excellent panoramic point over the Valle Devero and the three-thousanders of the Helsenhorn-Cervandone range, can be reached through a hiking path from the Alpe Devero. A ridge links it to the Punta d'Orogna to the south-west.
