= Spaltiite =

Mineral

General
- Category: Sulfosalt mineral
- Formula: Tl_{2}Cu_{2}As_{2}S_{5}
- IMA symbol: Spti
- IMA status: Approved (2014)
- Strunz classification: 2.LA.75
- Crystal system: Monoclinic
- Crystal class: Prismatic (2/m)
- Space group: P2_{1}/c (no. 14)
- Unit cell: a = 15.791(8) Å, b = 10.000(5) Å, c = 6.323(3) Å; β = 99.25(8)°; V = 985.5(8) Å^{3}

Identification
- Color: Greyish to black
- Crystal habit: Euhedral, long prismatic to lath-like crystals, elongated along [001]
- Cleavage: Perfect on {100}
- Mohs scale hardness: 1.5–2

Spaltiite is a rare thallium sulfosalt mineral with the ideal chemical formula Tl_{2}Cu_{2}As_{2}S_{5}. It was discovered on a waste dump of the Lengenbach quarry in the Binn Valley (Binntal), Canton Valais, Switzerland, a locality famous for producing an unusually large number of rare thallium- and arsenic-bearing sulfosalt minerals. Spaltiite was approved as a valid mineral species by the International Mineralogical Association's Commission on New Minerals, Nomenclature and Classification (IMA-CNMNC) in 2014, but a full scientific description of the species, including its crystal structure, was not published until 2026.

== Occurrence and discovery ==
The only known specimen of spaltiite, containing three crystals of the mineral, was recovered from a dump at the Lengenbach quarry, hosted in a small piece of pure white dolomite of Triassic age belonging to the Penninic Monte Leone Nappe. The Lengenbach locality has been mined and collected for more than 200 years and is the type locality for over 50 mineral species, with an especially large number of rare thallium- and arsenic-bearing sulfosalts. On the type specimen, spaltiite occurs together with pyrite, drechslerite and hatchite.

== Name and classification ==
The name spaltiite derives from the nickname "spalti", used informally by researchers during laboratory study of the mineral, in reference to its extremely well-developed cleavage; the name is ultimately derived from the German verb spalten, meaning "to split". The species and its name were approved by the IMA-CNMNC under proposal number IMA2014-012. The formal description of spaltiite was authored by Stefan Graeser, Dan Topa, Herta S. Effenberger, Emil Makovicky, Werner H. Paar and George Dincă, and published in the European Journal of Mineralogy in 2026. The holotype specimen is held in the collections of the Natural History Museum Vienna (catalogue no. N 9528).

== Physical and chemical properties ==
Spaltiite forms greyish to black, extremely soft euhedral crystals with a long prismatic to lath-like habit, typically around 2 mm in length but only about 0.2 mm thick. It has a Mohs hardness of 1.5–2, with measured Vickers microhardness (VHN_{15}) ranging from 30 to 65 kg/mm^{2} (mean 47 kg/mm^{2}). The mineral has a perfect cleavage parallel to {100}, which produces minute, plastic slabs. Electron-microprobe analyses of the type material gave an empirical formula of approximately Tl_{1.94}Cu_{2.04}Ag_{0.01}As_{1.95}Sb_{0.03}S_{5.03}, close to the ideal formula Tl_{2}Cu_{2}As_{2}S_{5}.

Spaltiite is monoclinic, crystallizing in space group P2_{1}/c, with unit-cell parameters a = 15.791(8) Å, b = 10.000(5) Å, c = 6.323(3) Å, β = 99.25(8)°, and a unit-cell volume of 985.5(8) Å^{3}. Its crystal structure has been described as having a pronounced layered atomic arrangement, with two polar Cu–As layers related to one another by inversion symmetry.

== See also ==
- List of minerals recognized by the International Mineralogical Association
