= Punta d'Orogna =

Mountain in Italy

Coordinates: 46°17′05″N 8°12′49″E

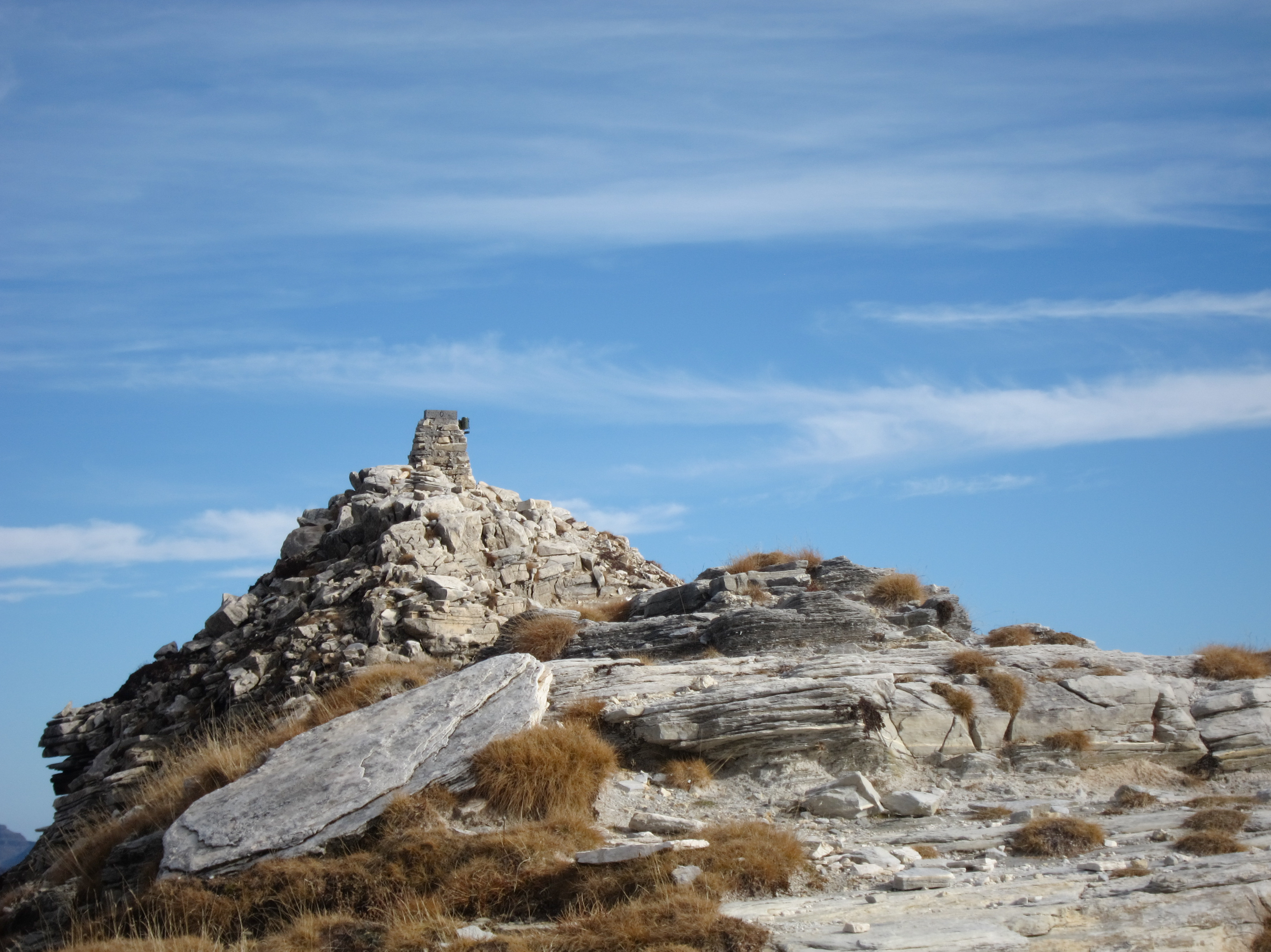
- Cairn atop Punta d'Orogna

Highest point
- Elevation: 2,474 m (8,117 ft)

Geography
- Location: Piedmont, Italy
- Parent range: Lepontine Alps

The Punta d'Orogna is a mountain of Piedmont, Italy, with an elevation of 2,447 metres (8,028 ft). Part of the Lepontine Alps, it closes the Valle Devero to the south, and is located inside the Alpe Veglia and Alpe Devero Natural Park.

The peak lies southwest of Monte Cazzola and southeast of Pizzo di Boccareccio. A cairn with a summit book marks the peak, which can be reached through a hiking path from the Alpe Devero.
