= Pizzo Diei =

Mountain in Italy

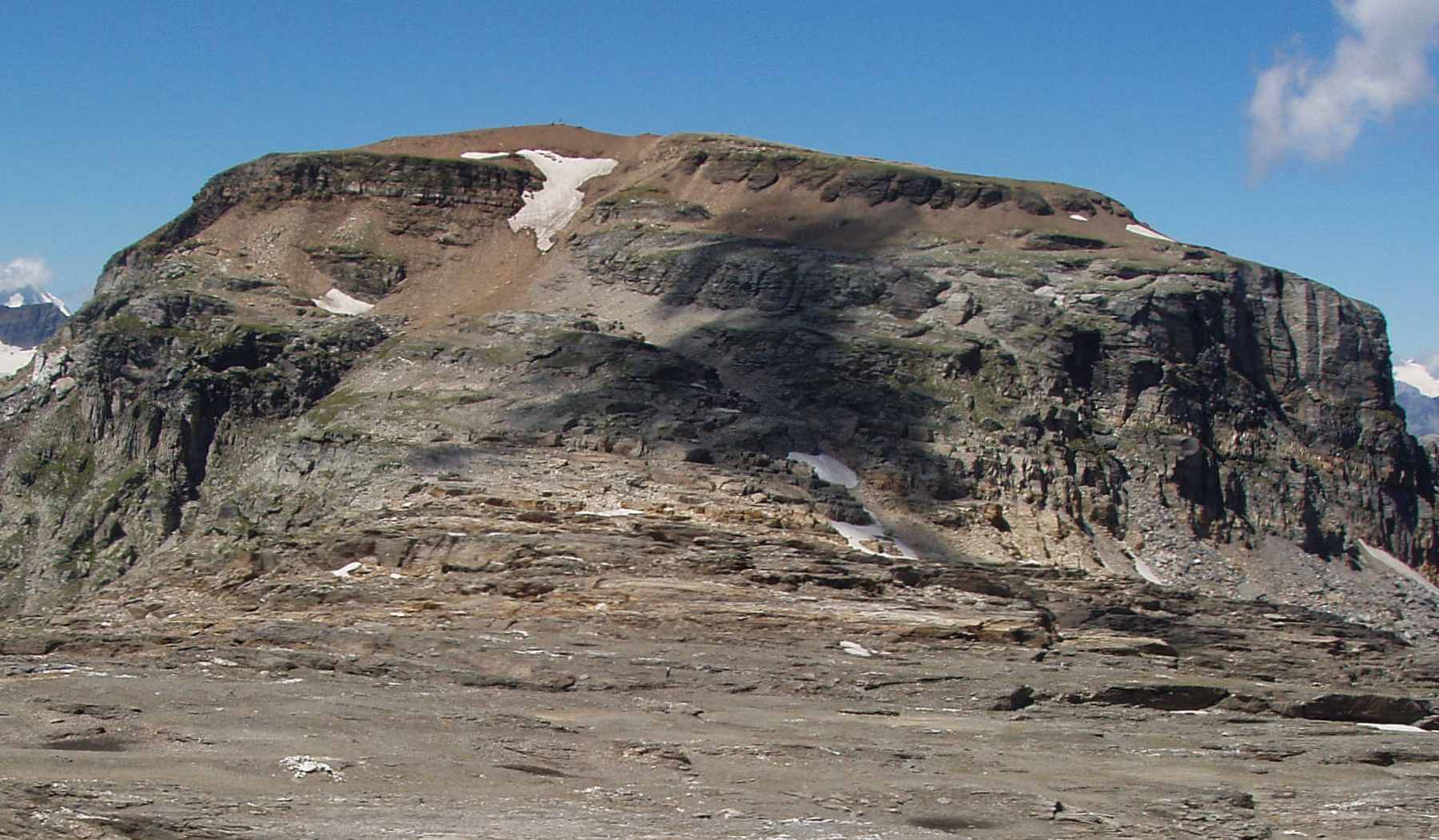
- Pizzo Diei

Highest point
- Elevation: 2,906 m (9,534 ft)
- Prominence: 623 m (2,044 ft)
- Isolation: 4.48 km (2.78 mi)
- Listing: Alpine mountains 2500-2999 m
- Coordinates: 46°15′53″N 8°14′17″E

Geography
- Location within Alps
- Location: Piedmont, Italy
- Parent range: Lepontine Alps

Pizzo Diei (2,906 m) is a mountain of the Lepontine Alps in Piedmont, northern Italy. It is located in the Alpe Veglia Nature Park in the commune of Varzo, and has a slightly lower sister peak, the pyramidal shaped Monte Cistella. The mountain is a popular ski mountaineering peak and its summit offers fine views of the Monte Rosa Massif.

== Features ==
The Pizzo Diei is located on a secondary range which divides Cairasca Valley (SW) from Devero Valley (NE). The Ciamporino pass (2.191 m) separates it from Punta della Sella (2.464 m), while eastwards the ridge continues with the monte Cistella. In the SOIUSA (International Standardized Mountain Subdivision of the Alps) the Sottogruppo Cistella-Diei takes its name from the mountain.

== History ==
Piazzo Diei is tied to some ancient legends concerning the Devil and witches; these old stories where influenced by the inhospitable of the plateau at the summit of the mountain, made of bare, windswept rocks.

== Access to the summit ==
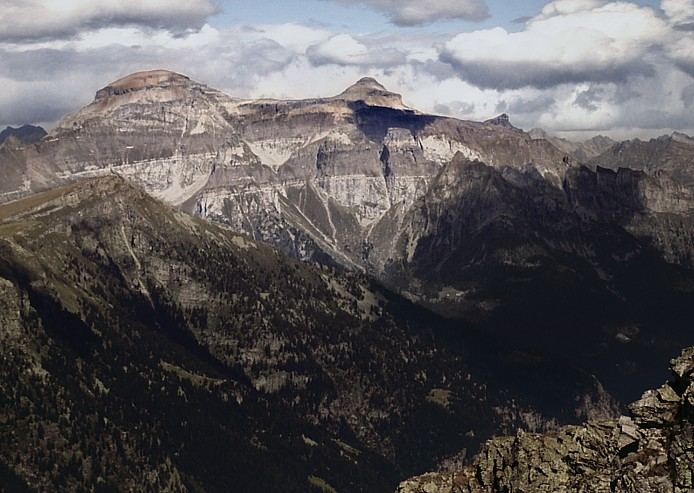
Pizzo Dei (on the left) and, on its right, monte Cistella and Corno Cistella

Pizzo Diei can be reached from the Alpe Ciamporino (1.958 m), which is connected to San Domenico di Varzo (1.420 m) by cableway. The hike can be combined with the ascent to the nearby monte Cistella. The route does not require alpinistic skills but can be dangerous with snow on the ground or bad weather due too orientation problems.

== Mountain huts ==
- Bivacco Giovanni Leoni (CAI di Domodssola, (2.803 m).

== Nature protection ==
The north face of Pizzo Diei is part of the Alpe Veglia and Alpe Devero Natural Park.

== Bibliography ==
- Armelloni, Renato (1986). Alpi Lepontine: Sempione, Formazza, Vigezzo : Leone, Helsenhorn, Cervandone, Arbola, Blinnenhorn, Basòdino, Fiorera, Biela, Pioda, Pioda di Crana. Guida dei Monti d'Italia (in Italian). Club Alpino Italiano / Touring Club Italiano. ISBN 9788836502899.
