= Schwarzhorn (Binntal) =

Mountain in Switzerland

- Location within Alps

Highest point
- Elevation: 3,108 m (10,197 ft)
- Prominence: 57 m (187 ft)
- Parent peak: Unnamed summit (3,112 m)
- Coordinates: 46°20′4.4″N 8°13′27.8″E

Naming
- Native name: Schwarzhorn (German); Punta Marani (Italian)

Geography
- Countries: Switzerland and Italy
- Canton/Region: Valais and Piedmont
- Parent range: Lepontine Alps

The Schwarzhorn (Italian: Punta Marani) is a mountain of the Lepontine Alps, located on the Swiss-Italian border, between the Binntal (Valais) and the Valle Dèvero (Piedmont). It lies north of the Scherbadung.

The area is renowned for its unique minerals that are found here in a dolomitic host rock. Elements found are typically As, Fe, Pb, Sb.
