= Monte del Sangiatto =

Mountain in Italy

Coordinates: 46°18′54″N 8°17′56″E

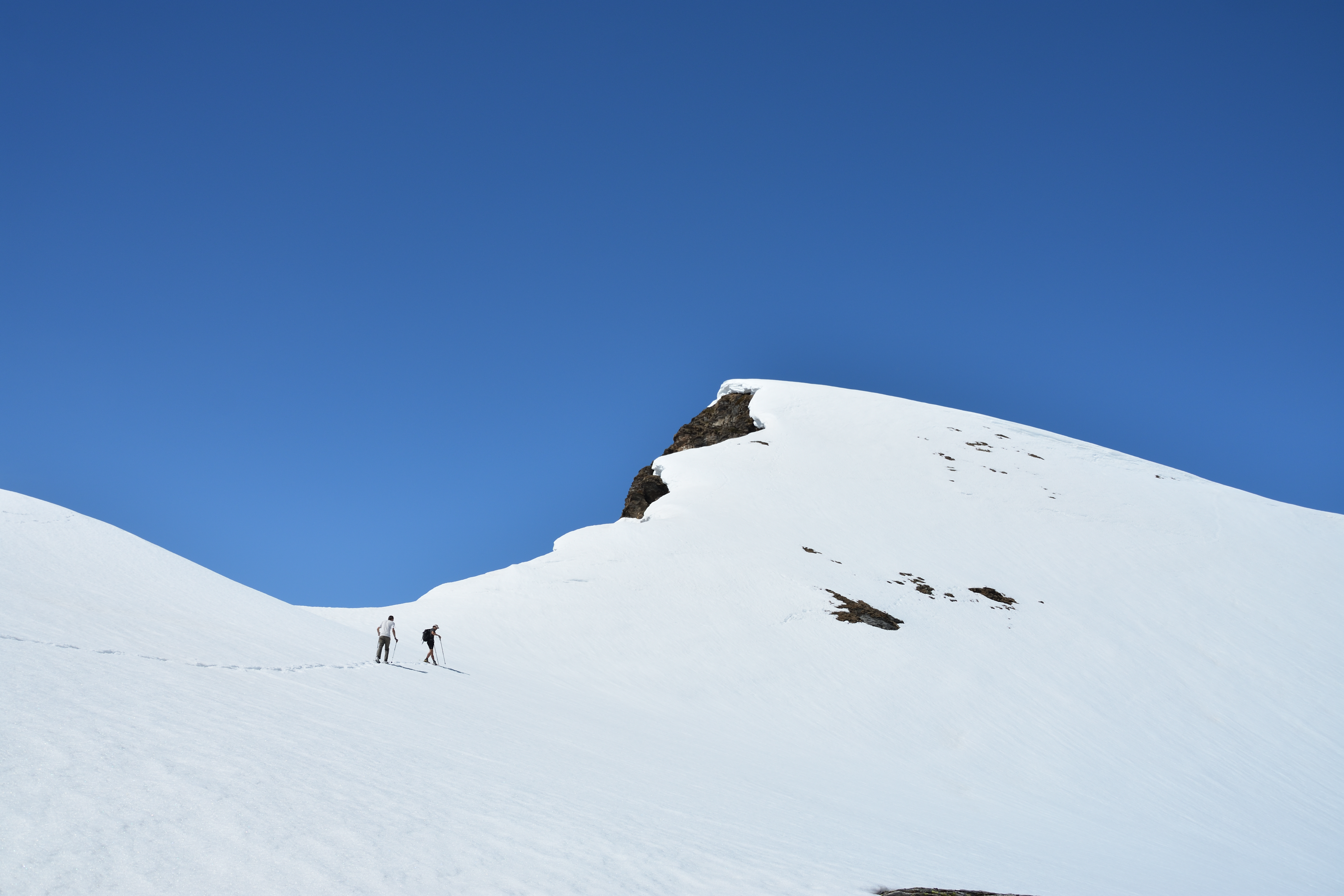
- The summit of Monte del Sangiatto seen from Bocchetta di Scarpia, in winter

Highest point
- Elevation: 2,387 m (7,831 ft)

Geography
- Location: Piedmont, Italy
- Parent range: Lepontine Alps

Monte del Sangiatto is a mountain of Piedmont, Italy, with an elevation of 2,387 metres (7,831 ft). Part of the Lepontine Alps, it is located in the Valle Devero, inside the Alpe Veglia and Alpe Devero Natural Park.

The mountain lies south of Monte Corbernas and can be reached on a hiking path starting from the Alpe Devero.
