= Hillehorn =

Mountain in Switzerland

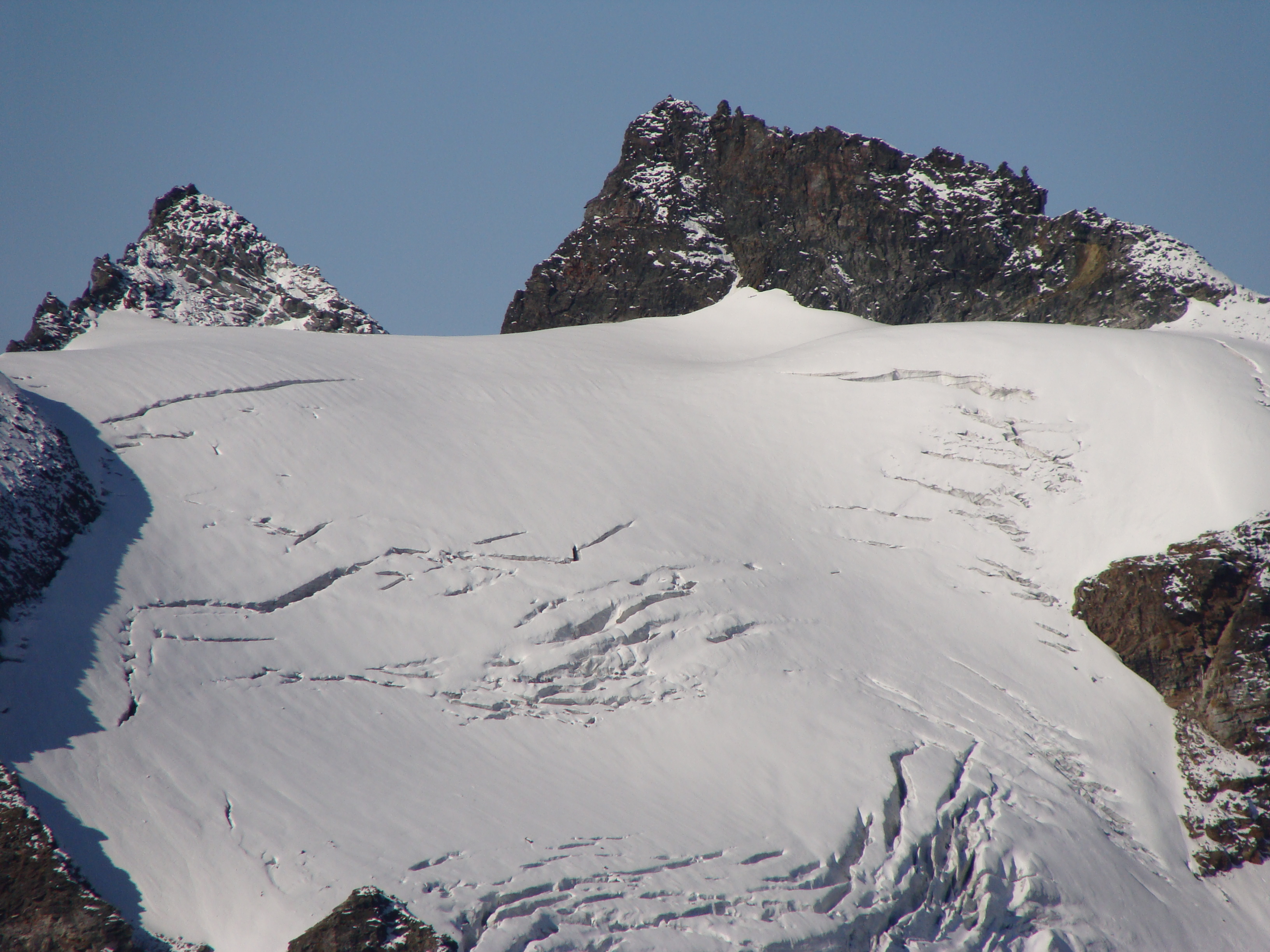
- The Hillehorn and the Hillegletscher (left: Punta Mottiscia, right: main summit)

Highest point
- Elevation: 3,181 m (10,436 ft)
- Prominence: 257 m (843 ft)
- Parent peak: Bortelhorn
- Coordinates: 46°18′11″N 8°8′25″E

Geography
- Location within Switzerland
- Location: Valais, Switzerland (mountain partially in Italy)
- Parent range: Lepontine Alps

The Hillehorn (also spelled Hillenhorn) is a mountain of the Lepontine Alps, located between the Gantertal and the Binntal in the canton of Valais, close to the border with Italy. The main summit has an elevation of 3,181 meters, while the Italian border culminates on the secondary summit named Punta Mottiscia at 3,158 meters. Between the two peaks is the Hillejoch.
