= Albrun Pass =

Alpine pass connecting Switzerland and Italy

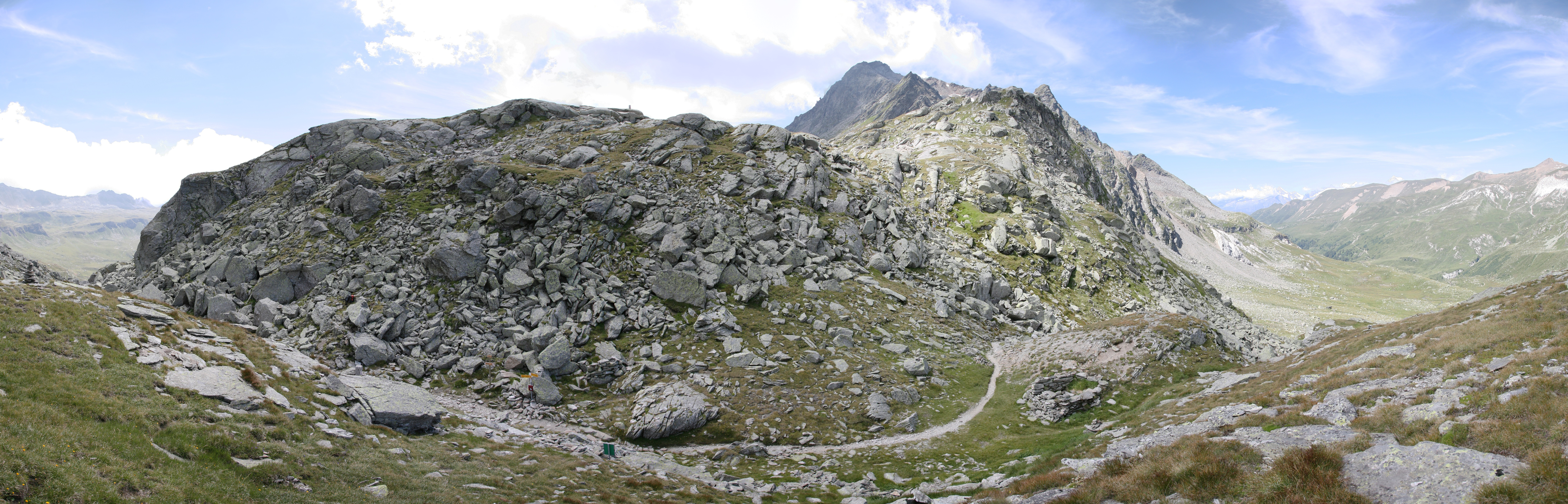
- Albrun Pass, Italian side on the left, Swiss side on the right

- Location within Alps
- Elevation: 2,409 metres (7,904 ft)
- Traversed by: Trail

Third Approach
- Location: Piedmont, Italy/Valais, Switzerland
- Range: Lepontine Alps
- Coordinates: 46°22′17″N 8°17′42″E

The Albrun Pass (German: Albrunpass, Italian: Passo d'Arbola or Bocchetta d'Arbola) is an Alpine pass connecting Switzerland and Italy. It connects Binn in the Binntal on its northern side to Baceno on its southern side. The Albrun Pass is the lowest pass on the main chain of the Alps between the Simplon Pass and the Gotthard Pass.

The pass is located between the Albrunhorn (west) and the Ofenhorn (east).
