= Albrunhorn =

Mountain in Switzerland

- Monte Figascian
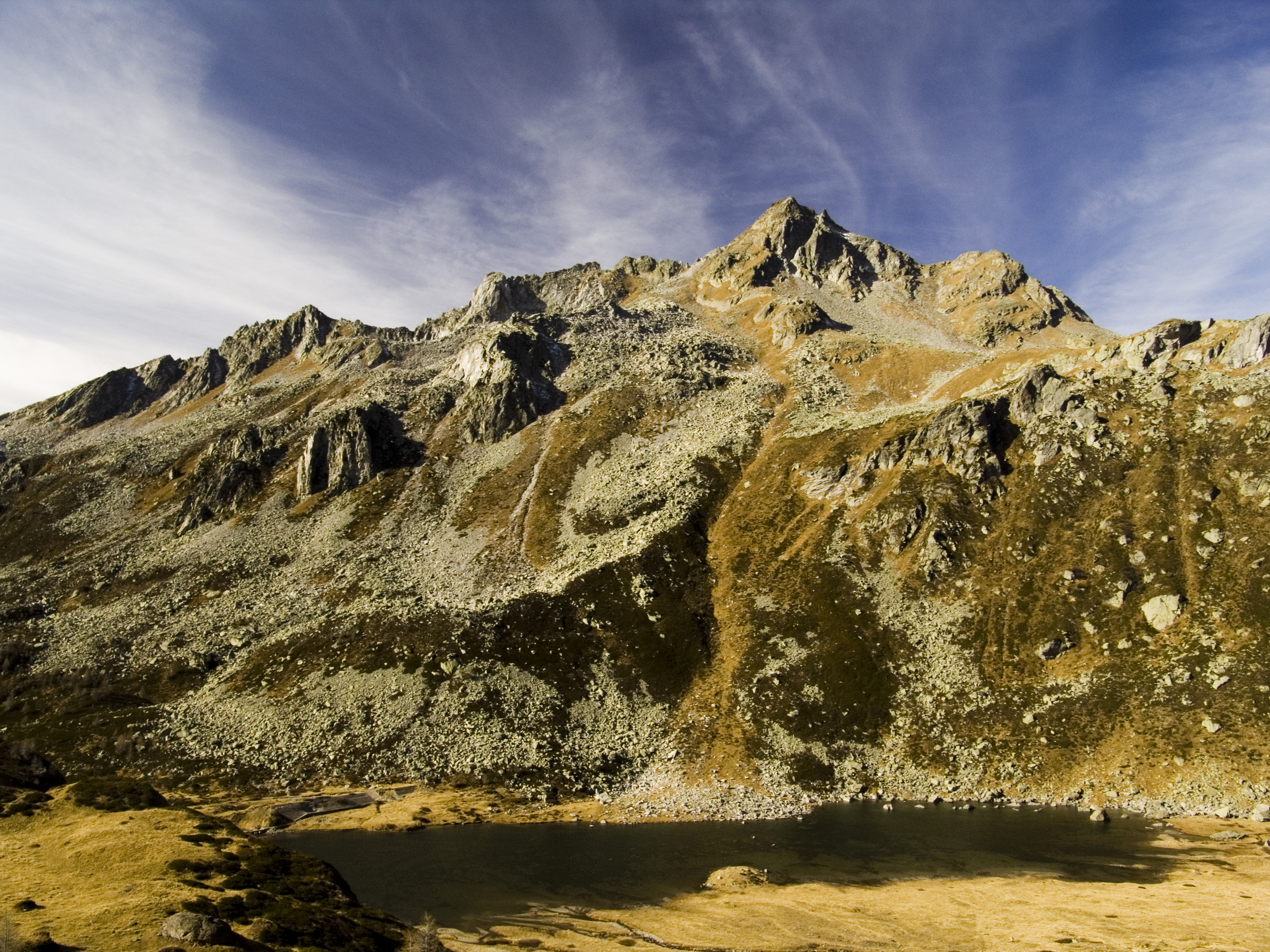

Highest point
- Elevation: 2,885 m (9,465 ft)
- Prominence: 221 m (725 ft)
- Parent peak: Gross Schinhorn
- Coordinates: 46°21′49″N 8°17′01″E

Geography
- Location within Alps
- Location: Piedmont, Italy/Valais, Switzerland
- Parent range: Lepontine Alps

The Albrunhorn (also known as Monte Figascian) is a mountain of the Lepontine Alps on the Swiss-Italian border. It overlooks the Albrun Pass.
