= Cafarsite =

Rare calcium iron arsenite mineral

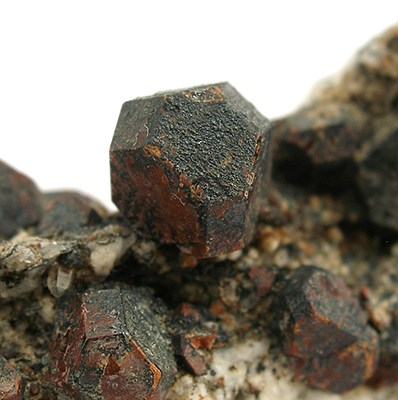
- Cafarsite on granite

General
- Category: Arsenites
- Formula: Ca_{8}(Ti,Fe^{2+},Fe^{3+},Mn)_{6–7}(AsO_{3})_{12}·4H_{2}O
- IMA symbol: Caf
- Strunz classification: 4.JC.05
- Crystal system: Isometric
- Crystal class: Diploidal (m3̅); H–M Symbol (2/m 3̅)
- Space group: Pn3̅
- Unit cell: a = 15.984 Å; Z = 4

Identification
- Formula mass: 2,230.31 g/mol
- Color: Dark brown
- Crystal habit: Cubic/octahedral crystals
- Fracture: Conchoidal
- Mohs scale hardness: 5 1/2 - 6
- Luster: sub-metallic
- Streak: Yellow brown
- Diaphaneity: Translucent to opaque
- Specific gravity: 3.9
- Optical properties: Isotropic
- Refractive index: n = 2.2

Cafarsite (Ca_{8}(Ti,Fe^{2+},Fe^{3+},Mn)_{6–7}(AsO_{3})_{12}·4H_{2}O) is a rare calcium iron arsenite mineral. Manganese and titanium occur with iron in the formula.

It was first described in 1966 for an occurrence in the Binn Valley, Valais, Switzerland. Its name is from the composition, calcium, ferrum (iron), and arsenic. It has also been reported from Piedmont, Italy and the Hemlo gold mine in the Thunder Bay District, Ontario, Canada.
