= Pizzo Cornera =

Mountain in Italy

Coordinates: 46°18′59″N 8°12′54″E

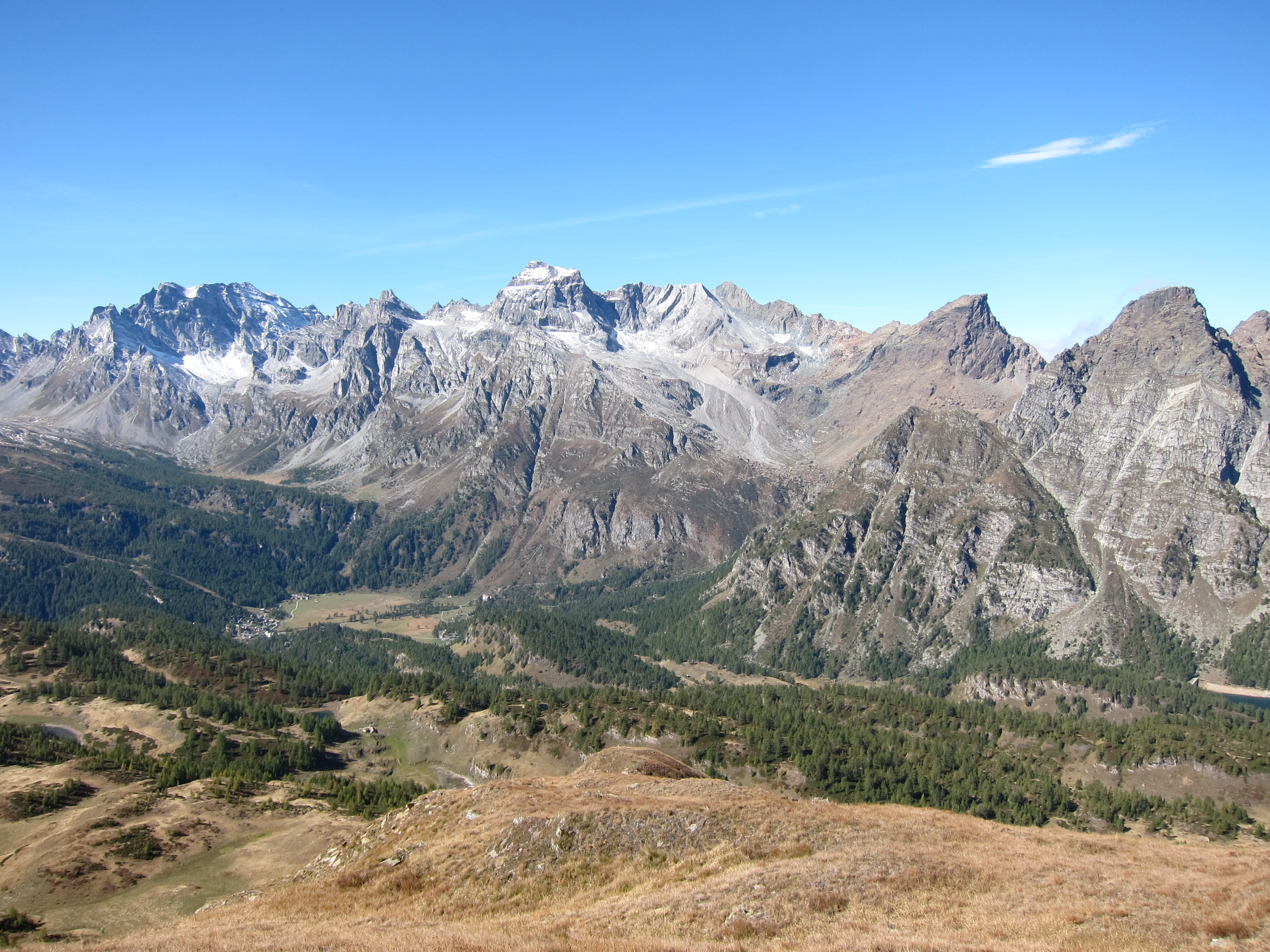
- Valle Devero seen from Monte Corbernas, Pizzo Cornera is the second peak from left.

Highest point
- Elevation: 3,084 m (10,118 ft)

Geography
- Location: Piedmont, Italy; Valais, Switzerland
- Parent range: Lepontine Alps

The Pizzo Cornera, also known as Gischihorn, is a mountain of the Lepontine Alps, with an elevation of 3,084 metres (10,118 ft). Located on the border between Italy and Switzerland, it lies at the head of the Valle Devero, overlooking the Alpe Devero. The peak can be climbed from Bivacco Combi e Lanza.
