= Mässersee =

Lake in Valais, Switzerland

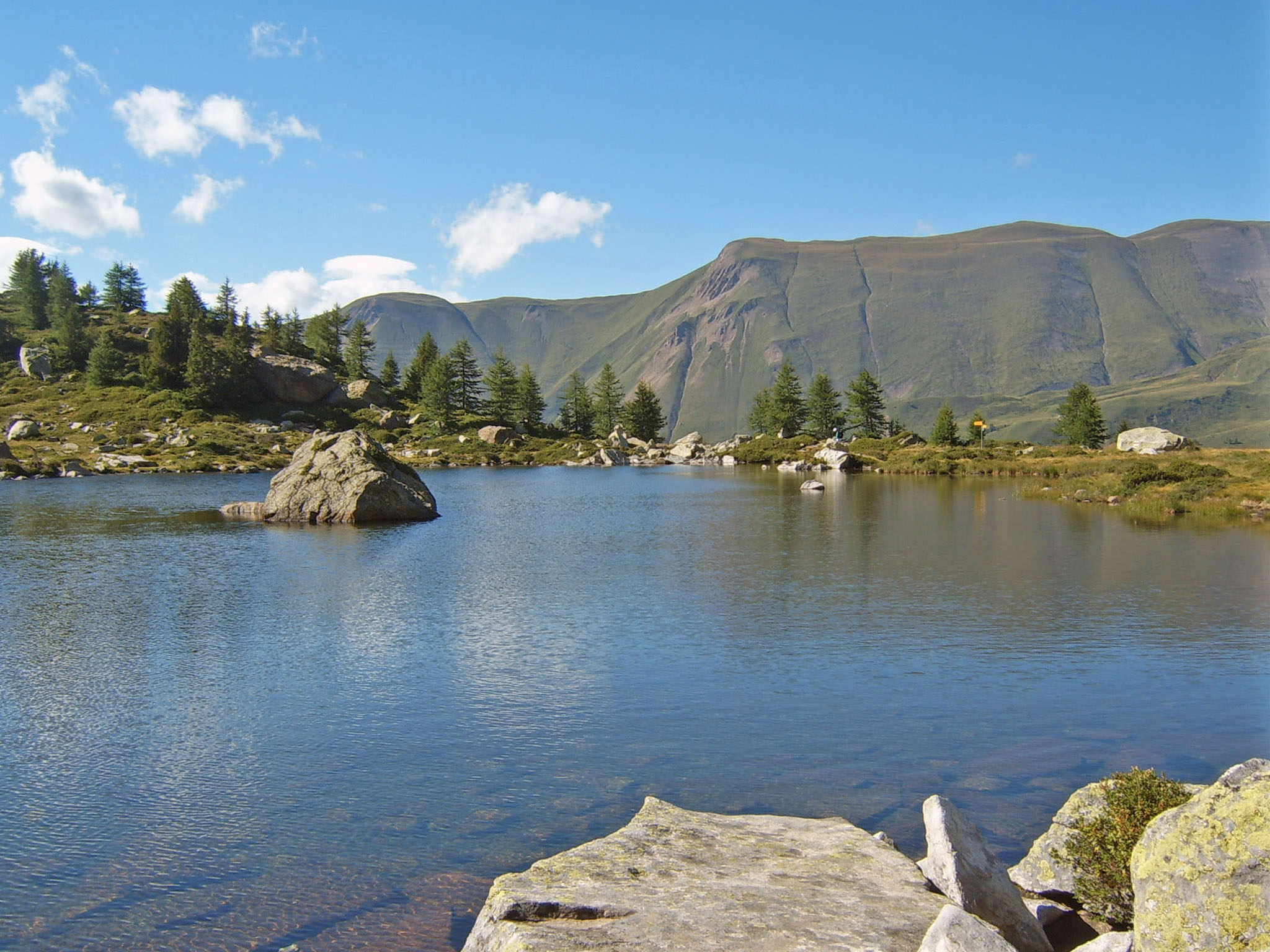
- Mässersee Binntal

- Location within Canton of Valais Location within Piedmont Location within Switzerland Location within Italy Location within Alps
- Interactive map of Mässersee
- Location: Binntal, Valais
- Coordinates: 46.354861°N 8.226944°E
- Primary outflows: Binna
- Basin countries: Switzerland
- Surface elevation: 2,130 m (6,990 ft)

Mässersee is the smallest of four mountain lakes in the upper Binntal (Binn valley) of the canton of Valais, Switzerland.
