= Lake d'Avino =

Artificial lake in Piedmont region, Italy

Lago d'Avino
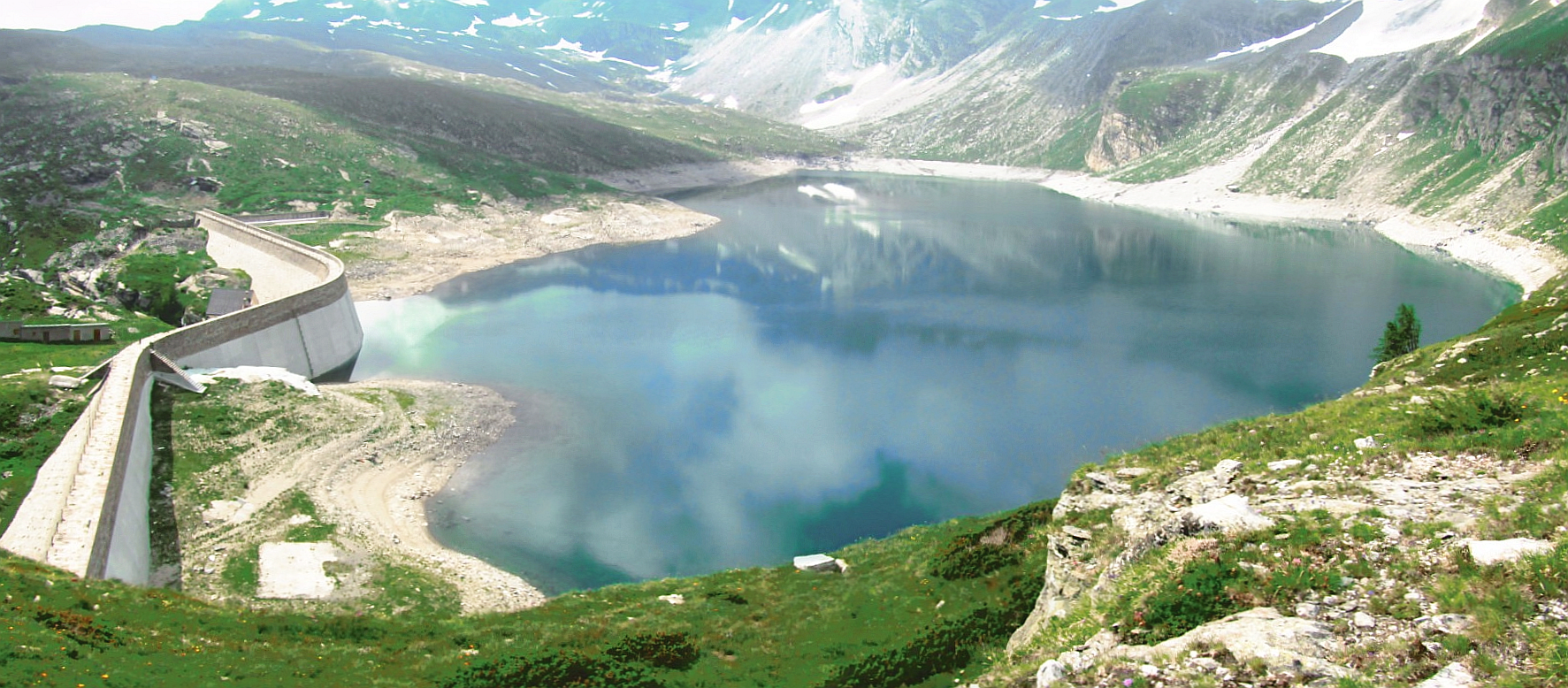
- Overview
- Interactive map of Lago d'Avino
- Location: Varzo, Province of Verbano-Cusio-Ossola, Piedmont, Italy
- Coordinates: 46°14′52″N 8°07′45″E
- Type: Artificial expansion of a natural lake
- Primary outflows: Cianciavero stream
- Basin countries: Italy
- Surface elevation: 2,246 m (7,369 ft)
- Islands: None

The Lago d'Avino is an artificial lake in the Province of Verbano-Cusio-Ossola, located at 2246 m above sea level within the Alpe Veglia and Alpe Devero Natural Park.

== Toponym ==
The current name of the lake likely derives from an original toponym d'Arvina, meaning of the Ruin, due to the rocky debris surrounding the body of water. Over time, it has also been called Lago Divino or Lago da Vino.

== Characteristics ==
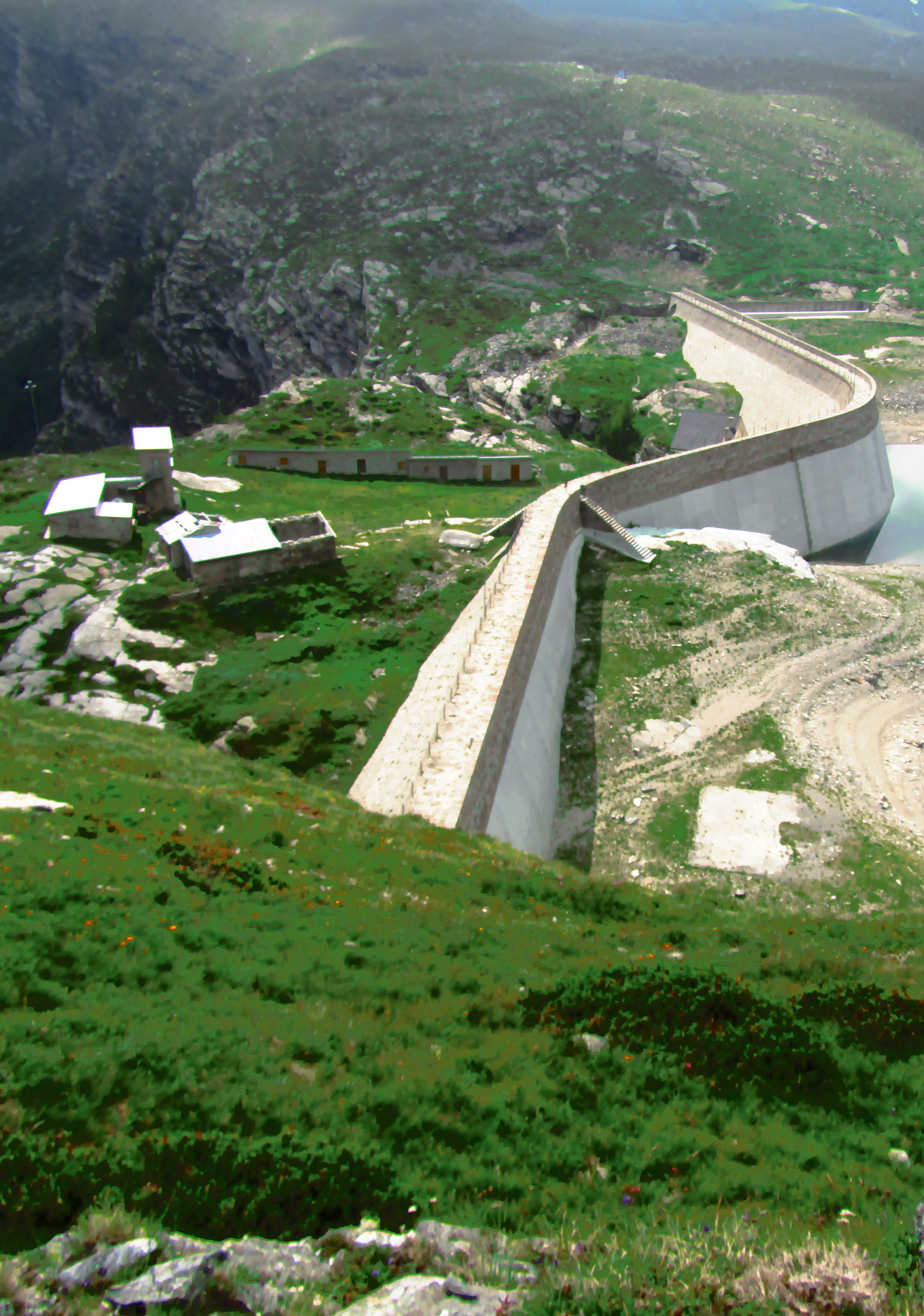
The dam

The body of water lies in a basin bounded to the southeast by the wall of Monte Leone, to the west by the border ridge between Italy and Switzerland, and to the south by the mountain ridge between the Cima di Valgrande and the Pizzo Valgrande. Its outflow, the Cianciavero stream, exits the basin heading north and joins other waterways to form the Cairasca stream. The reservoir is situated directly above the Simplon Tunnel.

== Dam ==
The dam was built to harness the lake's waters for hydroelectric purposes and began operating in 1913; it was later raised between 1917 and 1925. It is a gravity dam with a characteristic S shape formed by straight sections connected by curves. The water is then used to generate electricity at the Varzo hydroelectric power plant.

== Access ==
The ascent to the lake is a classic hike on marked trails and can be completed in about one and a half hours of walking from Alpe Veglia.

== Bibliography ==
- Fortis, Marco; Pavese, Claudio; Quadrio Curzio, Alberto (2003). Il Gruppo Edison, 1883-2003: profili economici e societari [The Edison Group, 1883-2003: Economic and Corporate Profiles] (in Italian). Vol. 2. Il Mulino.
