= Monte Cistella =

Mountain in Italy

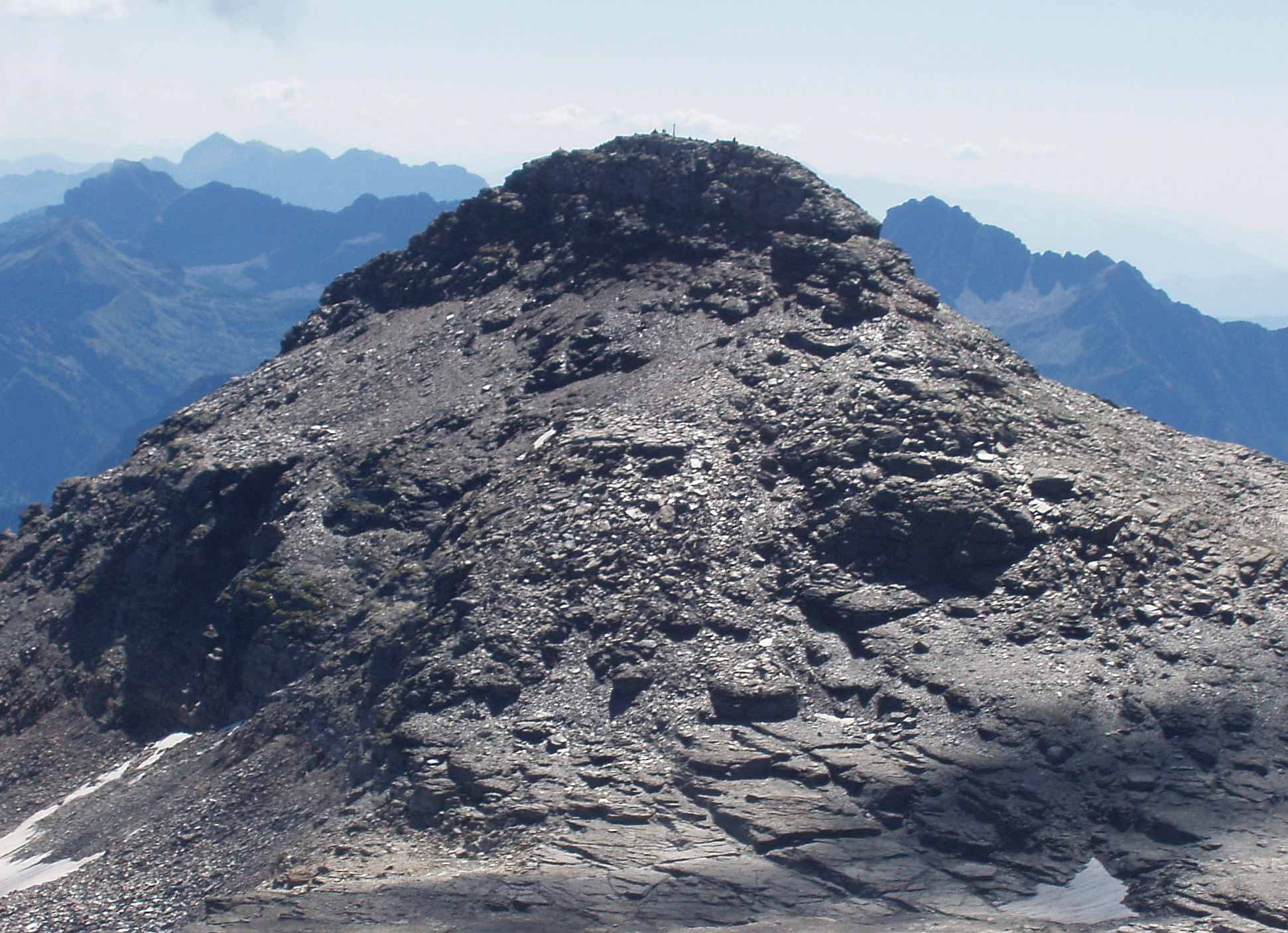
- Monte Cistella seen from Pizzo Diei

Highest point
- Elevation: 2,880 m (9,450 ft)
- Prominence: 109 m (358 ft)
- Parent peak: Pizzo Diei
- Coordinates: 46°15′34.0″N 8°15′11.0″E

Geography
- Location within Alps
- Location: Piedmont, Italy
- Parent range: Lepontine Alps

Monte Cistella is a mountain roughly in the middle of the Lepontine Alps.

== Description ==
It is fully in Ossolan territory and comprises three main peaks: the horn (2780m), the Cistella peak (2880m) and pizzo Diei (2906m). It is unlikely as a mountain such as these three peaks are connected by large relatively flat plateaus at an altitude of over 2600m. It is believed that they were smoothed out by large glaciers and the result is a highly individual mountain that is instantly recognizable (like the Matterhorn which is not far from it). It is the most symbolic mountain of the Ossola valley (not the tallest by far since Mount Rosa is at 4636m). But it is the most appreciated by the Ossolani, especially by the Vate dell'Ossola (maximum poet), Giovanni Leoni, who over one hundred years ago sang its praise. Ul Totorotela (Leoni's nickname) was one of the founders of the local Alpine Club as well as poet and traveller. He and his family have always had a long connection with this mountain and over 100 years ago he campaigned to build a mountain hut, a shelter for keen alpinists that still bear his name.

== SOIUSA classification ==
According to SOIUSA (International Standardized Mountain Subdivision of the Alps) the mountain is classified in the following way:

- main part = Western Alps
- major sector = North-Western Alps
- section = Lepontine Alps
- subsection = Northwestern Lepontine Alps
- supergroup = Catena Monte Leone-Blinnenhorn
- group = Gruppo dello Helsenhorn
- subgroup = Sottogruppo Cistella-Diei
- code = I/B-10.I-A.2.b
