= Geisspfadsee =

Lake in Valais, Switzerland

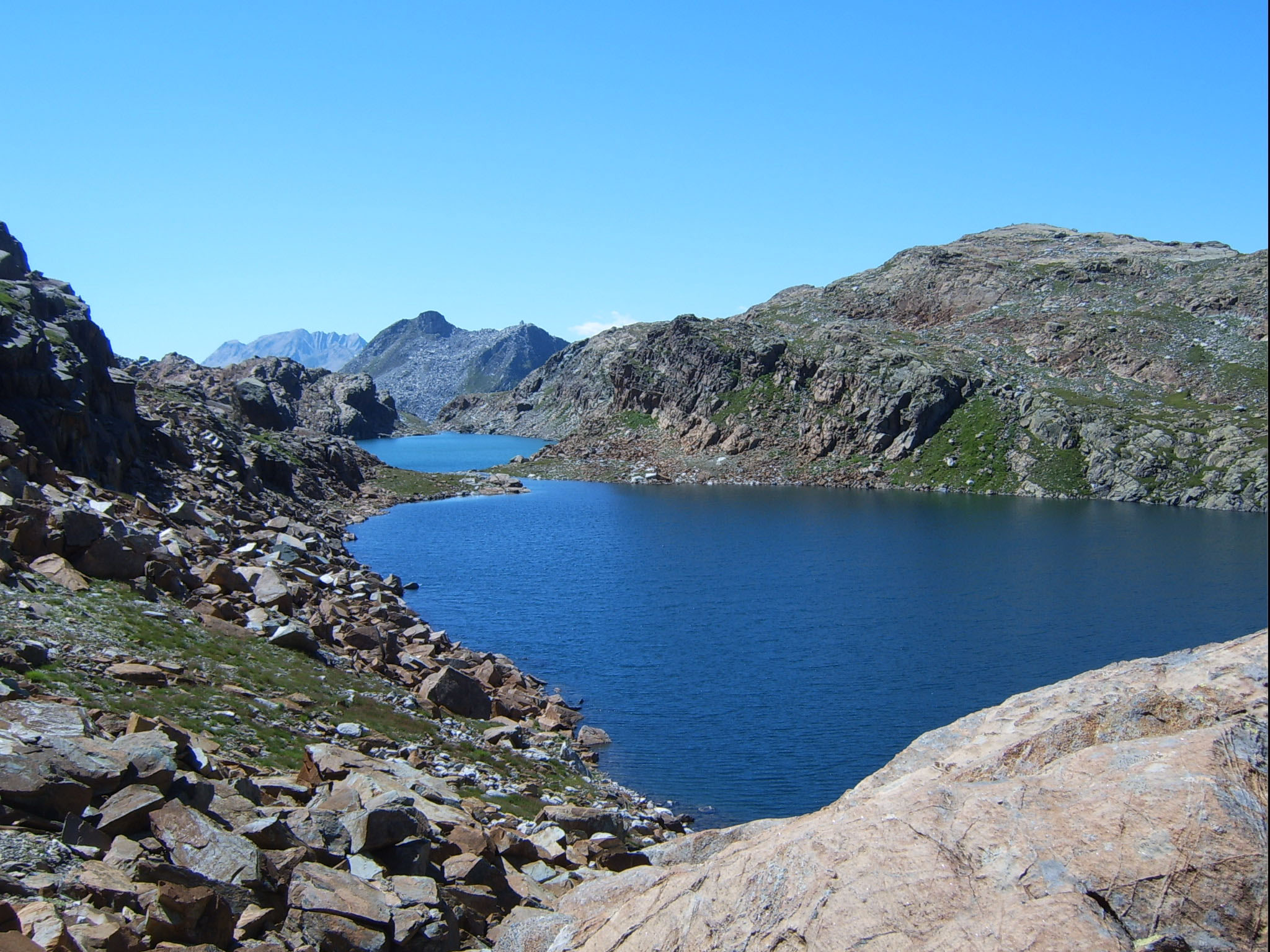
- view from eastern (spring 2004)

- Location within Canton of Valais Location within Piedmont Location within Switzerland Location within Italy Location within Alps
- Interactive map of Geisspfadsee
- Location: Valais
- Coordinates: 46°20′55″N 8°15′12″E
- Basin countries: Switzerland
- Surface area: 18 ha (44 acres)
- Surface elevation: 2,439 m (8,002 ft)

Geisspfadsee is a lake in Valais, Switzerland. Its surface area is 18 ha (44 acres). The lake is located in the municipality of Binn, at an elevation of 2439 m. It drains into Züesee (2420 m). The nearby border to Italy can be crossed at two mountain passes: Geisspfadpass (Passo della Rossa) and Grampielpass (Passo di Crampiolo). The name 'geisspfad' means, only goat may pass. A 'geiss' is a female goat in local mother tongue. Smugglers used this pass in recent times too, but it was never accessible with horses or donkeys for payloads.

== See also ==
- List of mountain lakes of Switzerland
