= Helsenhorn =

Mountain in Switzerland

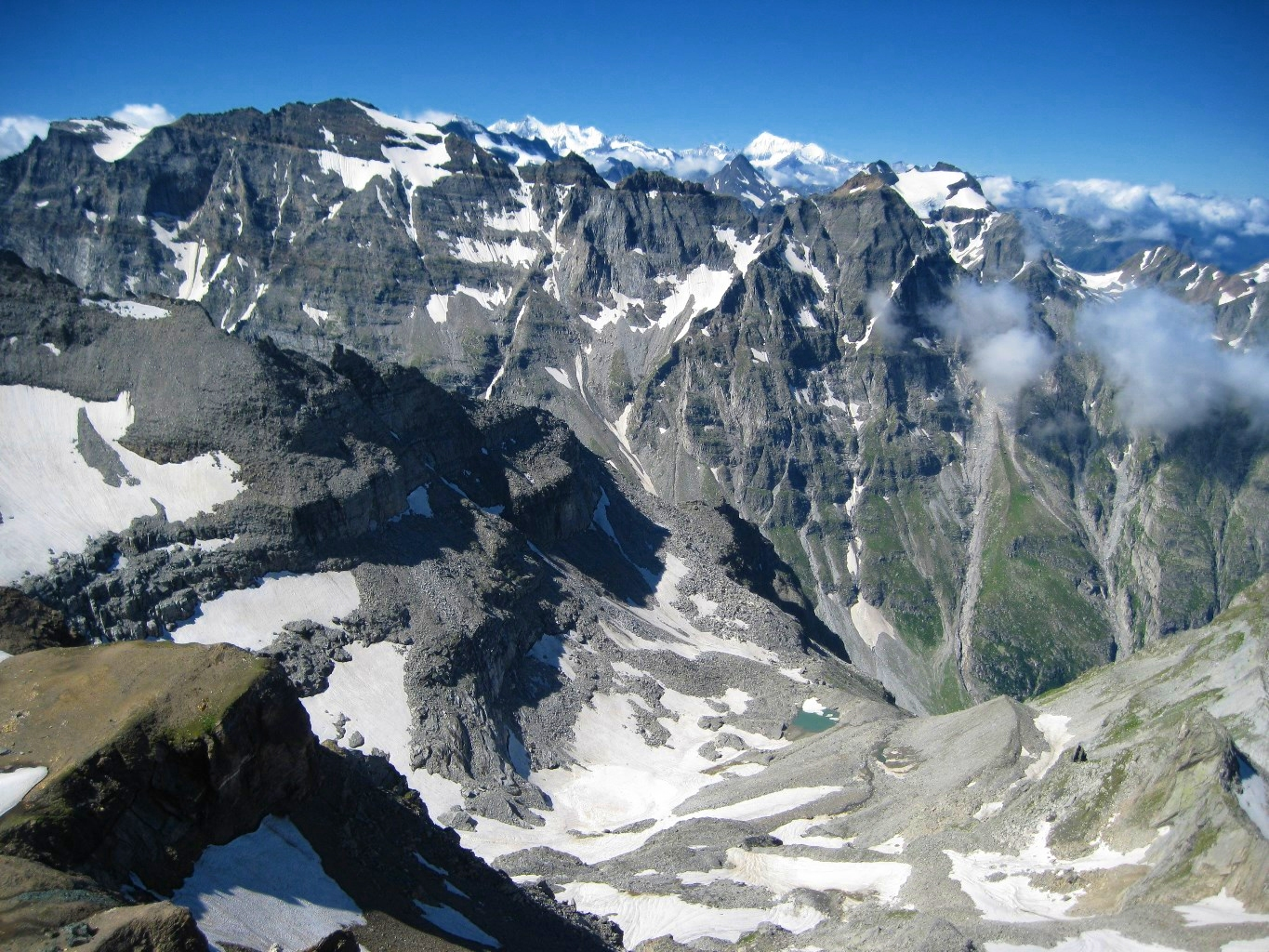
- View from near the Scherbadung (east side)

Highest point
- Elevation: 3,272 m (10,735 ft)
- Prominence: 586 m (1,923 ft)
- Parent peak: Monte Leone
- Listing: Alpine mountains above 3000 m
- Coordinates: 46°18′17″N 8°11′30″E

Geography
- Location within Switzerland
- Location: Valais, Switzerland (mountain partially in Italy)
- Parent range: Lepontine Alps

Climbing
- First ascent: August 1863 by Johann Jakob Weilenmann (solo)

The Helsenhorn is a mountain of the Lepontine Alps, overlooking Binn in the Swiss canton of Valais. With a height of 3,272 metres above sea level, it is the highest summit of the Binntal. The border with Italy runs approximately 200 metres south-east of the summit and culminates at 3,247 metres.

The east side of the Helsenhorn consists of a large face overlooking the Kriegalp Pass (2,494 m). On the west side is a small glacier named Helsengletscher.
