= Monte Corbernas =

Mountain in Italy

Coordinates: 46°19′25″N 8°18′32″E

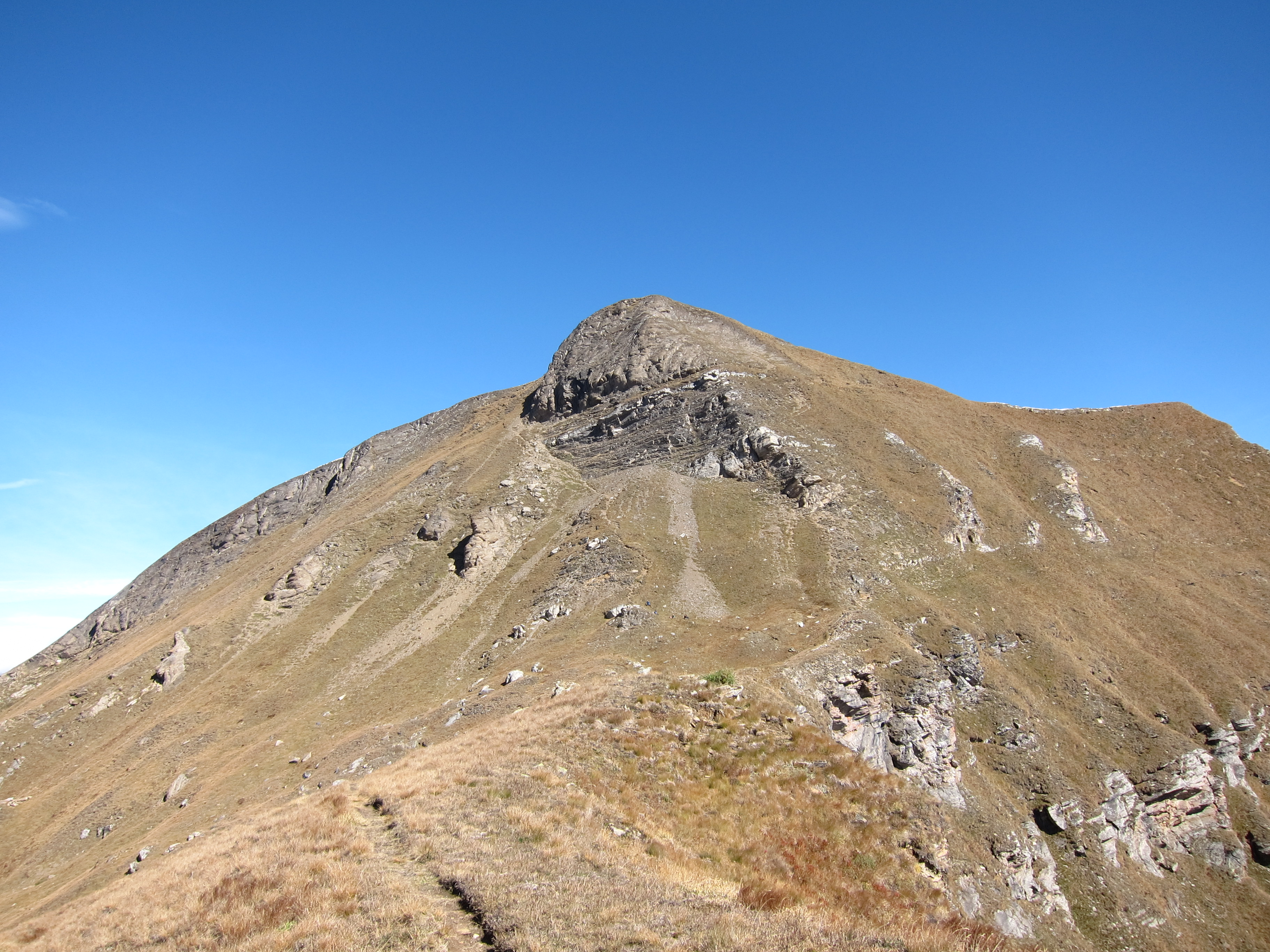
- Monte Corbernas seen from Bocchetta di Scarpia

Highest point
- Elevation: 2,578 m (8,458 ft)

Geography
- Location: Piedmont, Italy
- Parent range: Lepontine Alps

Monte Corbernas is a mountain of Piedmont, Italy, with an elevation of 2,578 metres (8,458 ft). Part of the Lepontine Alps, it is located in the Valle Devero, inside the Alpe Veglia and Alpe Devero Natural Park.

The mountain lies next to Monte del Sangiatto, overlooking the Alpe Devero and Lake Devero. A hiking path reaches the peak from the Alpe Devero.
