= Gross Schinhorn =

Mountain in Switzerland

- Punta di Valdeserta
- Location within Alps

Highest point
- Elevation: 2,939 m (9,642 ft)
- Prominence: 465 m (1,526 ft)
- Parent peak: Monte Leone
- Coordinates: 46°21′39″N 8°15′36″E

Geography
- Location: Piedmont, Italy/Valais, Switzerland
- Parent range: Lepontine Alps

The Gross Schinhorn (also known as Punta di Valdeserta) is a 2,939-metre-high (9,642 ft) mountain of the Lepontine Alps, located on the Swiss-Italian border.

A lower summit (2,917 m) named Klein Schinhorn lies north of the Gross Schinhorn. The two summits are referred as the Schinhörner.
