= Cervandonite =

Sorosilicate mineral

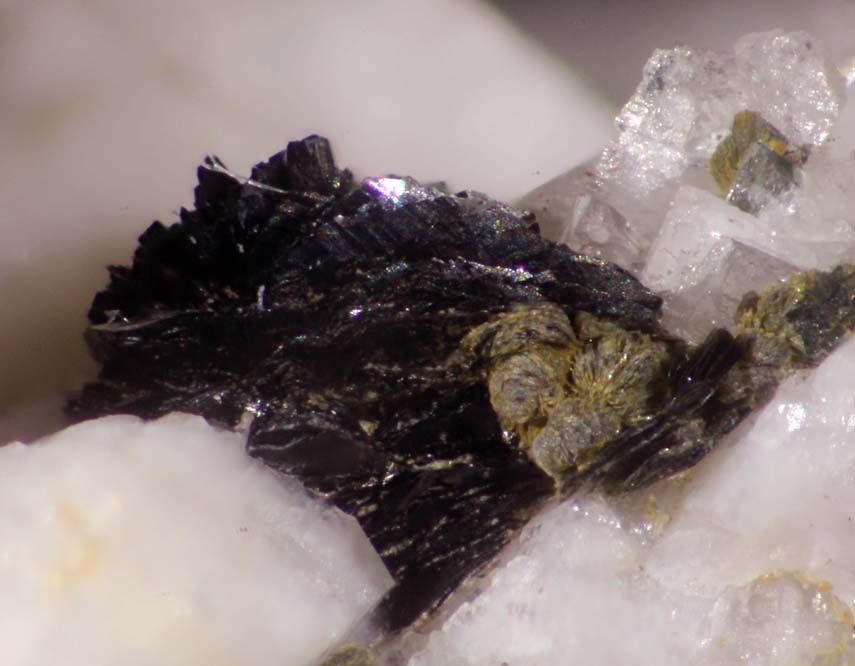
- Cervandonite is a classic and very sought after mineral from Binntal.

General
- Category: Silicate mineral
- Formula: (Ce,Nd,La)(Fe^{3+},Fe^{2+},Ti,Al)_{3}O_{2}(Si_{2}O_{7})(As^{3+}O_{3})(OH)
- Strunz classification: 9.BE.09.2
- Crystal system: Trigonal
- Space group: R3m

Identification
- Color: Black
- Crystal habit: Aggregates and rosettes of tabular crystals
- Cleavage: {001} Indistinct
- Fracture: Conchoidal
- Tenacity: Brittle
- Luster: Adamantine
- Streak: Brownish black
- Diaphaneity: Translucent to opaque
- Specific gravity: 4.9 (calculated)
- Optical properties: Biaxial
- Refractive index: n_{α} = 1.990 n_{γ} = 2.000
- Pleochroism: Yellowish, reddish brown to black

Cervandonite is a rare arsenosilicate mineral. It has a chemical formula (Ce,Nd,La)(Fe^{3+},Fe^{2+},Ti^{4+},Al)_{3}SiAs(Si,As)O_{13} or (Ce,Nd,La)(Fe^{3+},Fe^{2+},Ti,Al)_{3}O_{2}(Si_{2}O_{7})(As^{3+}O_{3})(OH). It has a monoclinic crustal structure with supercell (Z=6), the crystal structure was established as a trigonal subcell, with space group R3m and a = 6.508(1)Ǻ, c = 18.520(3) Ǻ, V 679.4(2) Ǻ^{3}, and Z=3. It was first described by Buhler Armbruster in 1988, but it has proven to be problem due to the extreme scarcity of single crystals and its unusual replacement of silicon and arsenic. Cervandonite is named after the location where it was first described, Pizzo Cervandone (Scherbadung), Italy in the Central Alps.

== Structure ==
The current work is based on a single- crystal fragment of cervandonite measuring 0.08 X 0.03 X 0.02 mm. The exact fragment was re-examined with MoKα radiation using BRUKER Apex II diffractometer equipped with a 2K CCD detector. Through the use of X-ray diffraction, the unusual nature of the As to Si substitution found arsenic to be present as As^{3+} instead of As^{5+}, with the presence of sorosilicate Si_{2}0_{7}^{6−} anions were also established. The original description of the cervandonite mineral, (Ce,Nd,La)(Fe^{3+},Fe^{2+},Ti^{4+},Al)_{3}SiAs(Si,As)O_{13}, was rewritten to (Ce,Nd,La)(Fe^{3+},Fe^{2+},Ti^{4+},Al)_{3}O_{2}(Si_{2}As_{7})_{1−x+y}(AsO_{3})_{1+x−y}(OH)_{3x−3y}. The x and y values are 0.47 and 0.31. Even though the values were derived from a refined and disordered crystal, the new formula matches the charge balance [13 negative versus 12.75 positive charges] for the average chemical composition for the M(1)+M(2) sites. The As-containing silicates, none of which contained the Si_{2}As_{7} composition, or arsenic in the 3+ state, where considered to be examples of As to Si diadochy. After accurate determination of the crystal structure the As and Si atoms where shown to occupy distinct cell sites. So far, the As-Si disorder is unique for the cervandonite mineral, and accounts for the As:Si ratio. Due to the unusual diadochy, the variable composition of cervandonite might consist of an assembly of more or less twinned microdomains. Since cervandonite contains different values of As/Si and unit- cell parameters, has observed one type of superstructure.

== Physical properties ==
Cervandonite- (Ce) has a monoclinic cell with Z=6. The monoclinic structure was refined as a trigonal subcell using 411 reflections with I > 2σ (I), R1=0.320, wR2=0.0887. The R- centered cell can be transformed with, a 6.508 (1), c 18.520 (3) Ǻ, V 679.4(2) Ǻ3, and Z=3. The structure has a space group of R3m, the solution of the cervandonite structure instantly revealed the presence of one eight-coordinated structure, REE-containing M(1) lying on the threefold axis and M(2) which includes Fe, Ti, or Al. The color of the mineral is a black, with transmitted light it will reflect a yellowish, reddish brown to black color. The mineral is brittle, porous, rosettelike aggregate, with adamantine luster, poorest at {001} cleavage, conchoidal fracture with a brownish-black streak, and a hardness= 5.0. Although cervandonite was found in Pizzo Cervandone, it is not the only rare mineral discovered there, much like the crystal fetiasite, which shares common morphology, fetiasite has a thin brown-red alteration layer with the perfect cleavage is on {100}. Cervandonite was discovered in the east region of Pizzo Cervandone, Alpe Devero, on the border of Italy and Switzerland, and on the west region of Cherbadung, Switzerland. This mountain is well known for Alpine excursionists and mineral collectors. It was known the 1960s as a site for rare and new minerals.
