= Bortelhorn =

Mountain in Switzerland

- Punta del Rebbio
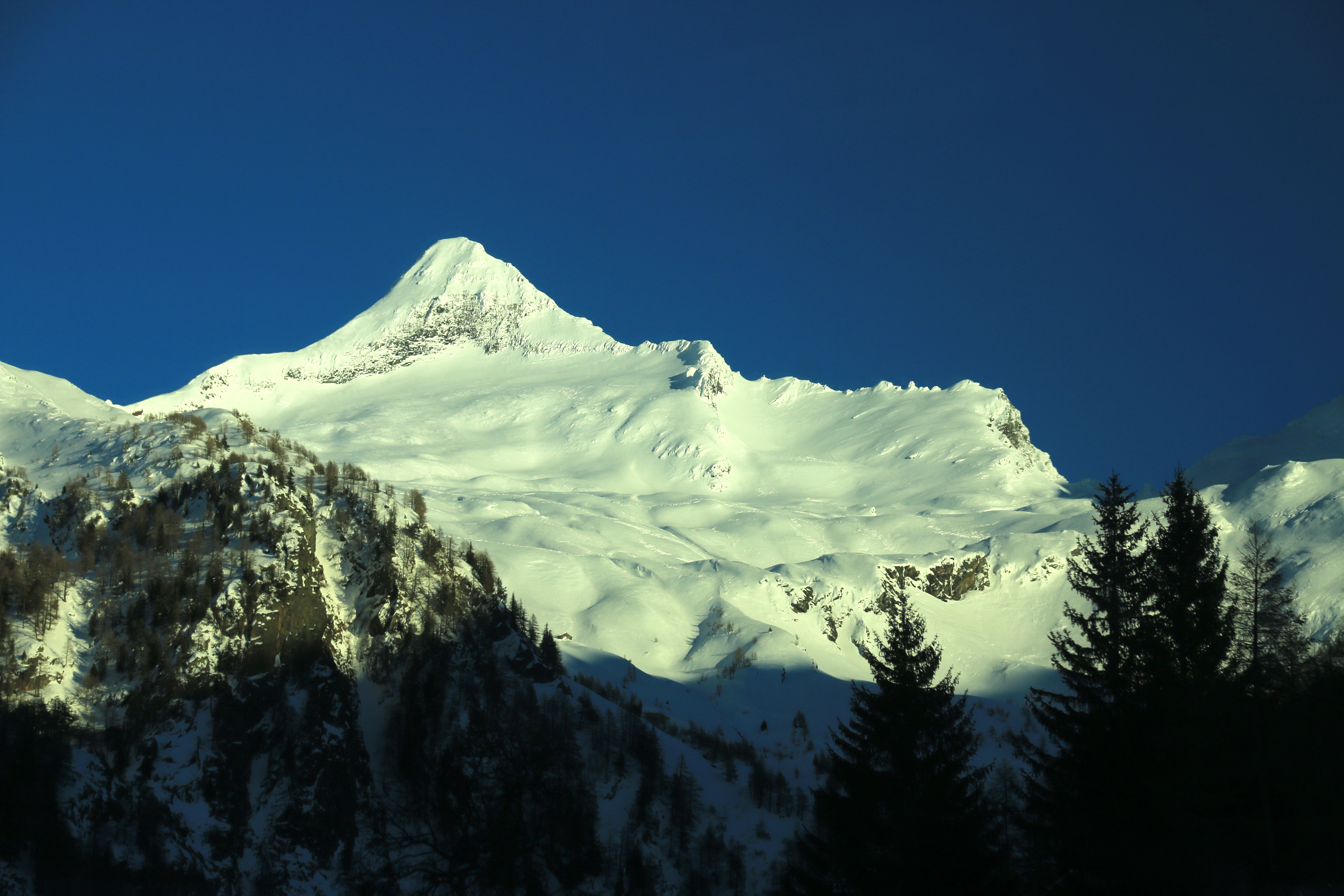
- Bortelhorn

Highest point
- Elevation: 3,194 m (10,479 ft)
- Prominence: 430 m (1,410 ft)
- Parent peak: Helsenhorn
- Listing: Alpine mountains above 3000 m
- Coordinates: 46°17′41″N 8°7′29″E

Geography
- Location within Alps
- Location: Piedmont, Italy/Valais, Switzerland
- Parent range: Lepontine Alps

The Bortelhorn (also known as Punta del Rebbio) is a mountain of the Lepontine Alps on the Swiss-Italian border. On its west side it overlooks the Gantertal.
