= Binn =

- Municipality
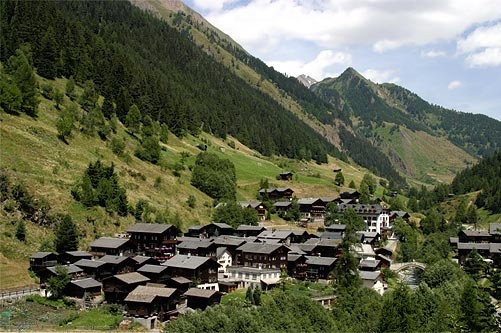

- Flag Coat of arms
- Location of Binn
- Location within Switzerland Location within Canton of Valais
- Coordinates: 46°22′N 8°11′E
- Country: Switzerland
- Canton: Valais
- District: Goms

Government
  - Mayor: Beat Tenisch

Area
  - Total: 65.0 km^{2} (25.1 sq mi)
- Elevation: 1,400 m (4,600 ft)

Population (December 2002)
  - Total: 151
  - Density: 2.32/km^{2} (6.02/sq mi)
- Time zone: UTC+01:00 (CET)
  - Summer (DST): UTC+02:00 (CEST)
- Postal code: 3996
- SFOS number: 6054
- ISO 3166 code: CH-VS
- Surrounded by: Baceno (IT-VB), Ernen, Formazza (IT-VB), Grengiols, Reckingen-Gluringen
- Twin towns: Urtenen-Schönbühl (Switzerland), Arbon (Switzerland)
- Website: www.binn.ch

Binn (Walser German: Bìi) is a municipality in the district of Goms in the canton of Valais in Switzerland.

The Binn Valley is known for its rich mineral deposits, some types of which are unique to the area. The notable Lengenbach Quarry is in Binn.

== History ==
Binn was first mentioned in 1297 as Buen, Buyn, Bun, and Bondolun.

== Geography ==
Binn has an area, as of 2011, of 65 square kilometers (25 mi^{2}). Of this area, 25.7% is used for agricultural purposes, while 16.9% is forested. Of the rest of the land, 0.4% is settled (buildings or roads) and 57.0% is unproductive land.

This village in the Swiss Alps is located at an elevation of 1,400 m (4,600 ft). It consists of the village of Schmidigehischere and the hamlets of Ze Binne, Wilere, Giesse and Fäld as well as part of the pilgrimage site of Heiligkreuz in the Leng Valley.

Geisspfadsee and Züesee are located in the municipality.

=== Lengenbach quarry ===
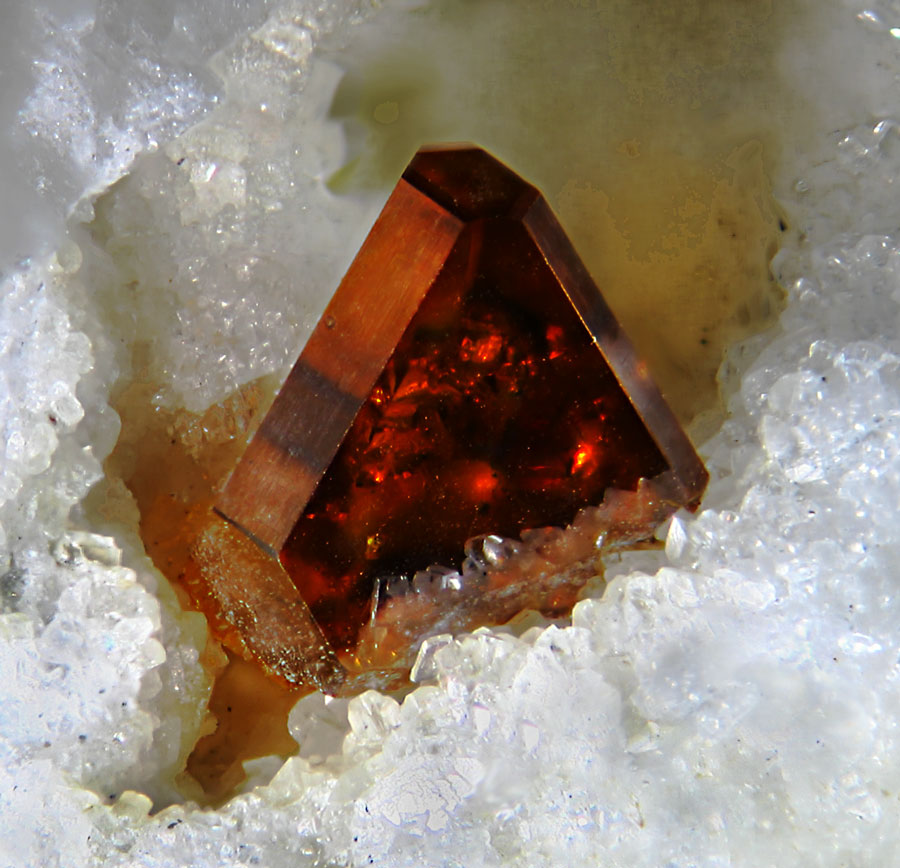
Sphalerite crystal on Dolomite, Lengenbach. Photo and Coll. J. Rosell

The Lengenbach Quarry (LGB) is noted among the mineralogical community for its unusual sulfosalt specimens.

The mineralogy has been studied for nearly 200 years. Lengenbach is the type locality for 29 minerals.

== Coat of arms ==
The blazon of the municipal coat of arms is Azure, issuant from Coupeaux Vert a triple (papal) Cross Or between in Chief two Greek Crosses of the same.

== Demographics ==
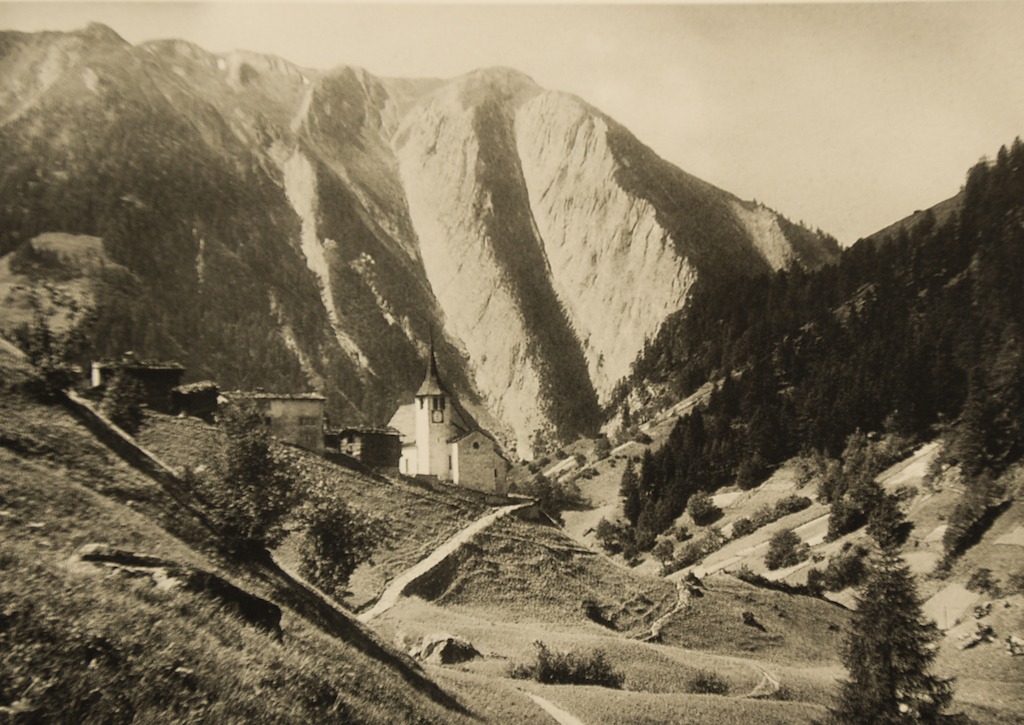
Parts of Binn and Wilere with the Breithorn mountain in the background

Binn has a population (as of December 2020) of 127. As of 2008, 2.7% of the population are resident foreign nationals. Over the last 10 years (1999–2009 ) the population has changed at a rate of -17.4%. It has changed at a rate of -22.1% due to migration and at a rate of 2.9% due to births and deaths.

Most of the population (as of 2000) speaks German (152 or 98.1%) as their first language, Italian is the second most common (2 or 1.3%) and French is the third (1 or 0.6%).

As of 2008, the gender distribution of the population was 52.1% male and 47.9% female. The population was made up of 72 Swiss men (50.7% of the population) and 2 (1.4%) non-Swiss men. There were 66 Swiss women (46.5%) and 2 (1.4%) non-Swiss women. Of the population in the municipality 85 or about 54.8% were born in Binn and lived there in 2000. There were 32 or 20.6% who were born in the same canton, while 26 or 16.8% were born somewhere else in Switzerland, and 10 or 6.5% were born outside of Switzerland.

The age distribution of the population (as of 2000) is children and teenagers (0–19 years old) make up 17.4% of the population, while adults (20–64 years old) make up 59.4% and seniors (over 64 years old) make up 23.2%.

As of 2000, there were 65 people who were single and never married in the municipality. There were 76 married individuals, 10 widows or widowers and 4 individuals who are divorced.

As of 2000, there were 69 private households in the municipality, and an average of 2.2 persons per household. There were 25 households that consist of only one person and 4 households with five or more people. Out of a total of 72 households that answered this question, 34.7% were households made up of just one person. Of the rest of the households, there are 19 married couples without children, 19 married couples with children There were 2 single parents with a child or children. There were 4 households that were made up of unrelated people and 3 households that were made up of some sort of institution or another collective housing.

In 2000 there were 87 single family homes (or 61.3% of the total) out of a total of 142 inhabited buildings. There were 37 multi-family buildings (26.1%), along with 8 multi-purpose buildings that were mostly used for housing (5.6%) and 10 other use buildings (commercial or industrial) that also had some housing (7.0%).

In 2000, a total of 67 apartments (35.8% of the total) were permanently occupied, while 97 apartments (51.9%) were seasonally occupied and 23 apartments (12.3%) were empty. The vacancy rate for the municipality, in 2010, was 0.53%.

The historical population is given in the following chart:

== Heritage sites of national significance ==
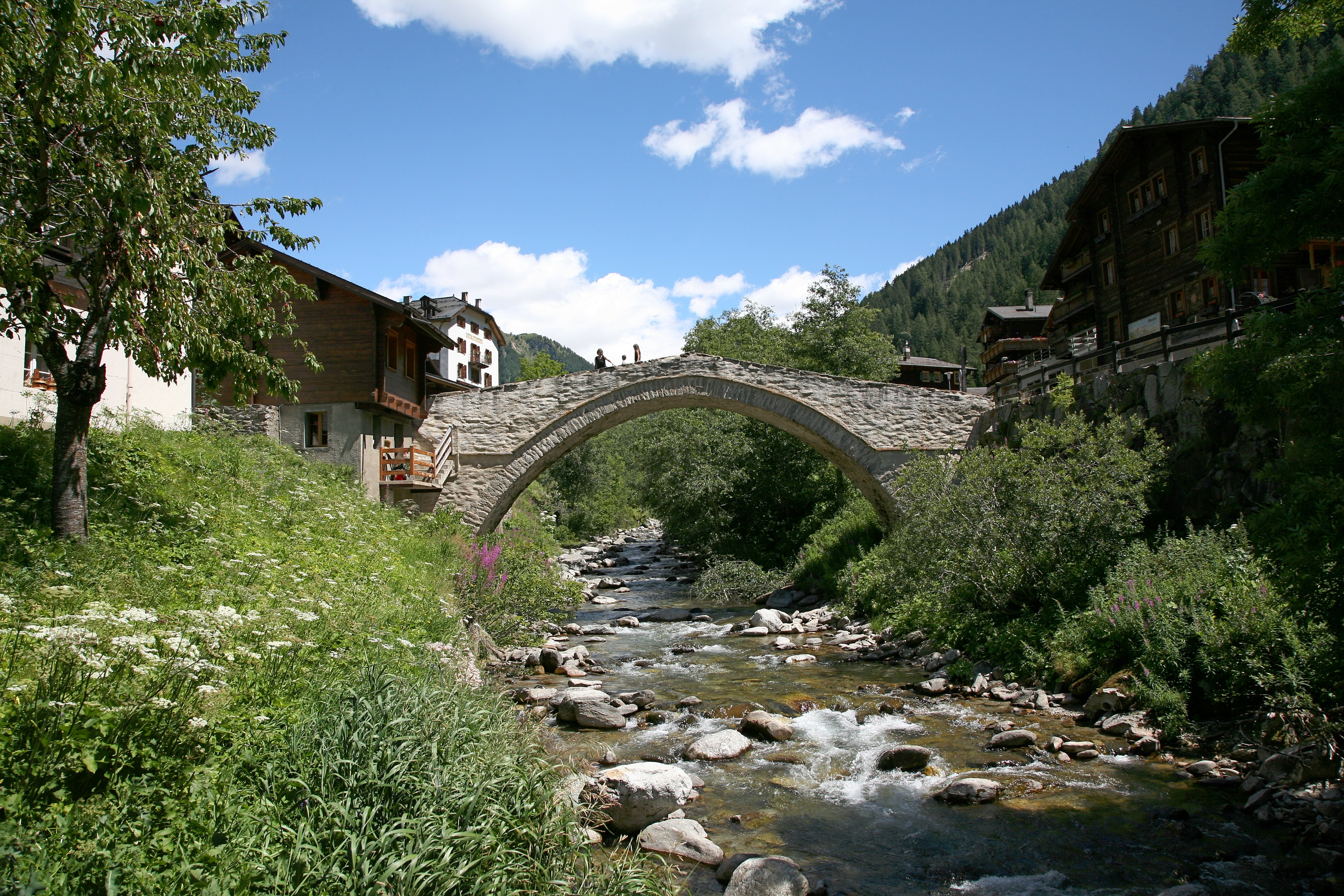
Binn bridge

The Bogenbrücke (Bridge) with the chapel of St. Anton is listed as a Swiss heritage site of national significance. The entire village of Schmidigehischere and the hamlet of Fäld are part of the Inventory of Swiss Heritage Sites.

== Politics ==
In the 2007 federal election the most popular party was the CVP which received 70.68% of the vote. The next three most popular parties were the SVP (19.75%), the SP (7.1%) and the FDP (2.47%). In the federal election, a total of 49 votes were cast, and the voter turnout was 41.9%.

In the 2009 Conseil d'État/Staatsrat election a total of 48 votes were cast, of which 2 or about 4.2% were invalid. The voter participation was 43.2%, which is much less than the cantonal average of 54.67%. In the 2007 Swiss Council of States election a total of 49 votes were cast, of which 2 or about 4.1% were invalid. The voter participation was 41.9%, which is much less than the cantonal average of 59.88%.

== Economy ==
As of 2010, Binn had an unemployment rate of 0.2%. As of 2008, there were 11 people employed in the primary economic sector and about 7 businesses involved in this sector. 7 people were employed in the secondary sector and there were 2 businesses in this sector. 32 people were employed in the tertiary sector, with 9 businesses in this sector. There were 71 residents of the municipality who were employed in some capacity, of which females made up 39.4% of the workforce.

In 2008 the total number of full-time equivalent jobs was 39. The number of jobs in the primary sector was 7, all of which were in agriculture. The number of jobs in the secondary sector was 6, all of which were in manufacturing. The number of jobs in the tertiary sector was 26. In the tertiary sector; 2 or 7.7% were in wholesale or retail sales or the repair of motor vehicles, 18 or 69.2% were in a hotel or restaurant, 1 was a technical professional or scientist, 1 was in education.

In 2000, there were 6 workers who commuted into the municipality and 33 workers who commuted away. The municipality is a net exporter of workers, with about 5.5 workers leaving the municipality for every one entering. Of the working population, 5.6% used public transportation to get to work, and 45.1% used a private car.

== Religion ==
From the 2000 census, 135 or 87.1% were Roman Catholic, while 10 or 6.5% belonged to the Swiss Reformed Church. 5 (or about 3.23% of the population) belonged to no church, are agnostic or atheist, and 5 individuals (or about 3.23% of the population) did not answer the question.

== Weather ==
Binn has an average of 109.9 days of rain or snow per year and on average receives 1,085 mm (42.7 in) of precipitation. The wettest month is October during which time Binn receives an average of 125 mm (4.9 in) of rain or snow. During this month there is precipitation for an average of 8.2 days. The month with the most days of precipitation is May, with an average of 11.2, but with only 122 mm (4.8 in) of rain or snow. The driest month of the year is February with an average of 70 mm (2.8 in) of precipitation over 9.3 days.

== Education ==
In Binn about 45 or (29.0%) of the population have completed non-mandatory upper secondary education, and 12 or (7.7%) have completed additional higher education (either university or a Fachhochschule). Of the 12 who completed tertiary schooling, 75.0% were Swiss men, 25.0% were Swiss women.

During the 2010-2011 school year there were a total of 7 students in the Binn school system. The education system in the Canton of Valais allows young children to attend one year of non-obligatory Kindergarten. During that school year, there were no kindergarten classes (KG1 or KG2) and there were no kindergarten students. The canton's school system requires students to attend six years of primary school. In Binn there was one class and 7 students in the primary school. The secondary school program consists of three lower, obligatory years of schooling (orientation classes), followed by three to five years of optional, advanced schools. All the lower secondary students from Binn attend their school in a neighboring municipality. All the upper secondary students attended school in another municipality.

As of 2000, there were 5 students from Binn who attended schools outside the municipality.
