= Scherbadung =

Mountain in Switzerland

- Monte Cervandone
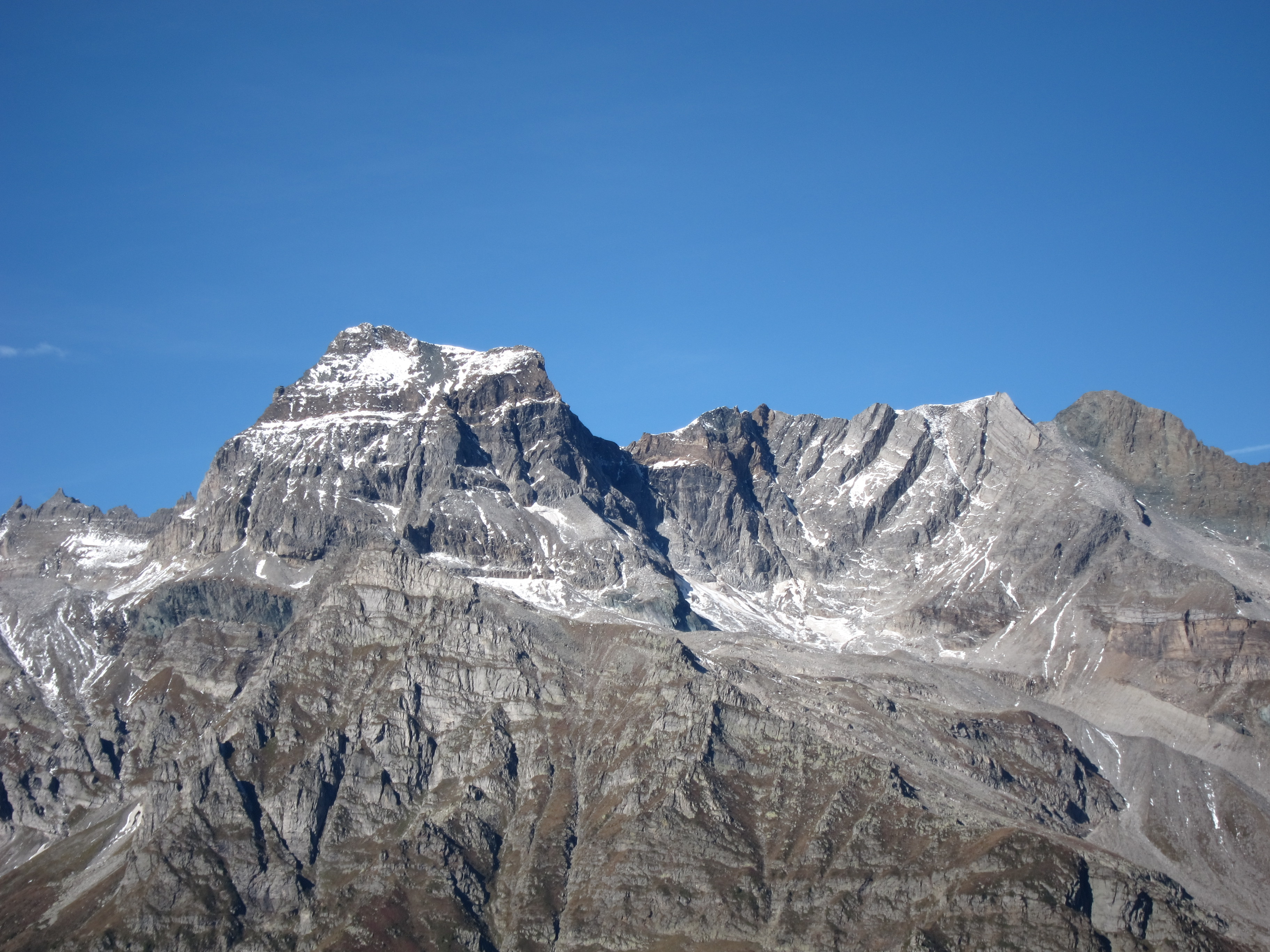
- View from Monte Corbernas (Devero Valley)

Highest point
- Elevation: 3,211 m (10,535 ft)
- Prominence: 717 m (2,352 ft)
- Parent peak: Monte Leone
- Listing: Alpine mountains above 3000 m
- Coordinates: 46°19′27″N 8°13′23″E

Geography
- Location within Alps
- Location: Piedmont, Italy/Valais, Switzerland
- Parent range: Lepontine Alps

The Scherbadung (also known as Pizzo Cervandone or Monte Cervandone) is a mountain of the Lepontine Alps on the Swiss-Italian border. Its Italian name has been used to name the mineral cervandonite which has only been found there (Devero Alp; Devero Valley; Val Devero).

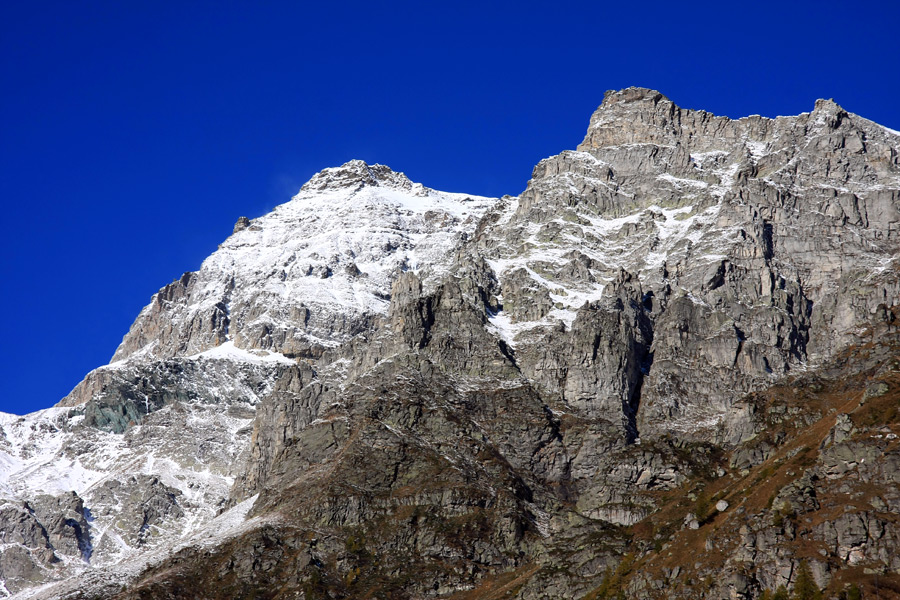
View of the peak from the east side
