= Binntal =

Valley of the Alps

Binn Valley
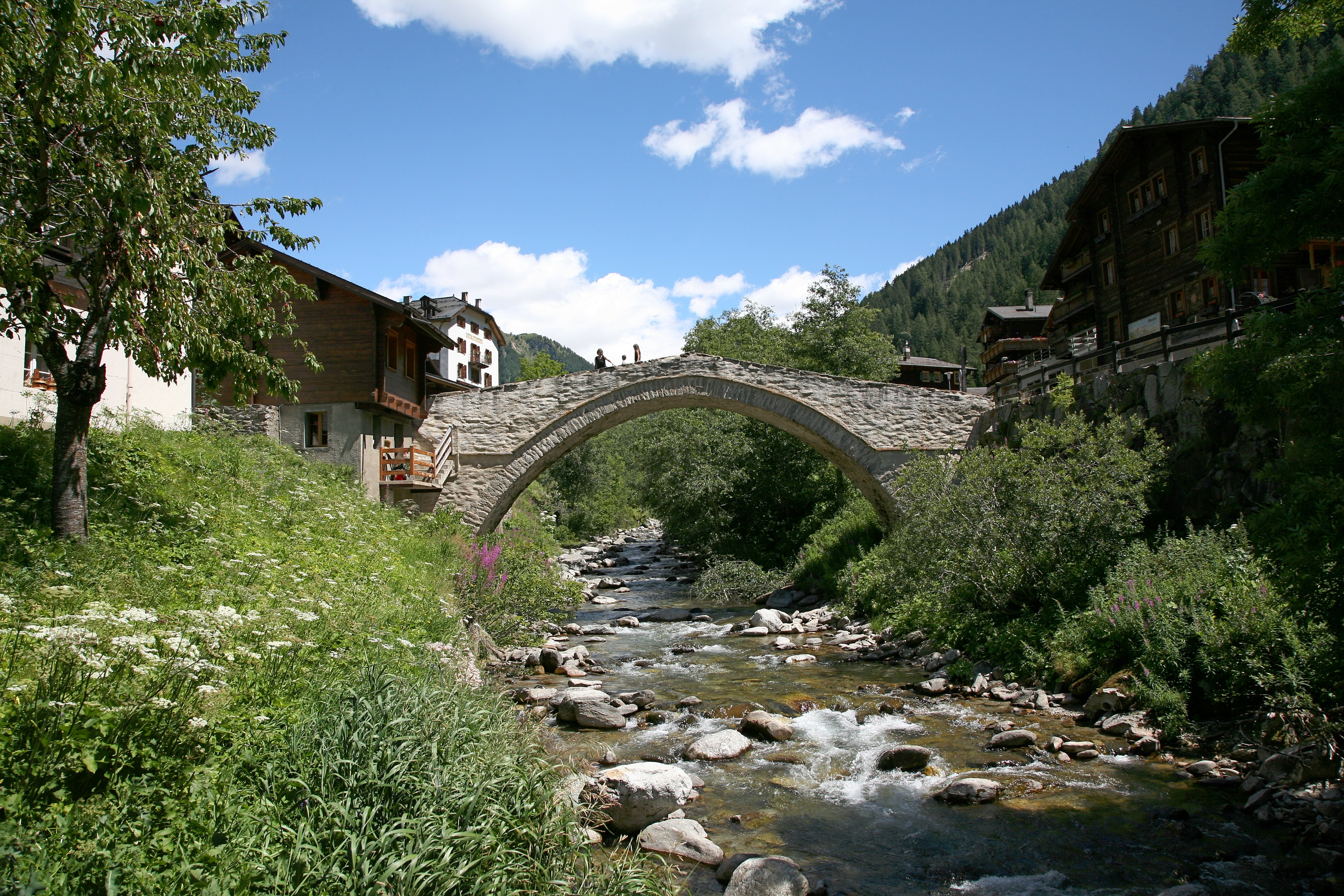
- The Binna at Binn

Naming
- Native name: Binntal (German)

Geography
- Country: Switzerland
- Canton: Valais
- Coordinates: 46°22′00″N 8°11′30″E
- Interactive map of Binn Valley

The Binn Valley (German: Binntal) is a valley of the Alps, located on the north side of the Lepontine Alps in the Swiss canton of Valais. The valley is drained by the Binna, a tributary of the Rhone, at Grengiols. The valley is named after Binn (1,400 m), the main settlement. Other villages or localities are Ausserbinn (1,291 m), Heiligkreuz (1,458 m) and Fäld (1,547 m).

The mountains in the Binntal generally exceed 3,000 metres. The highest are the Helsenhorn, the Turbhorn and the Ofenhorn. On the upper east side of the valley, the Albrun Pass connects it with the Italian Valle Devero.

== See also ==
- Lengenbach Quarry
- Mässersee
- Nature parks in Switzerland
