= Val Devero =

Valley in the Piedmont region of Italy

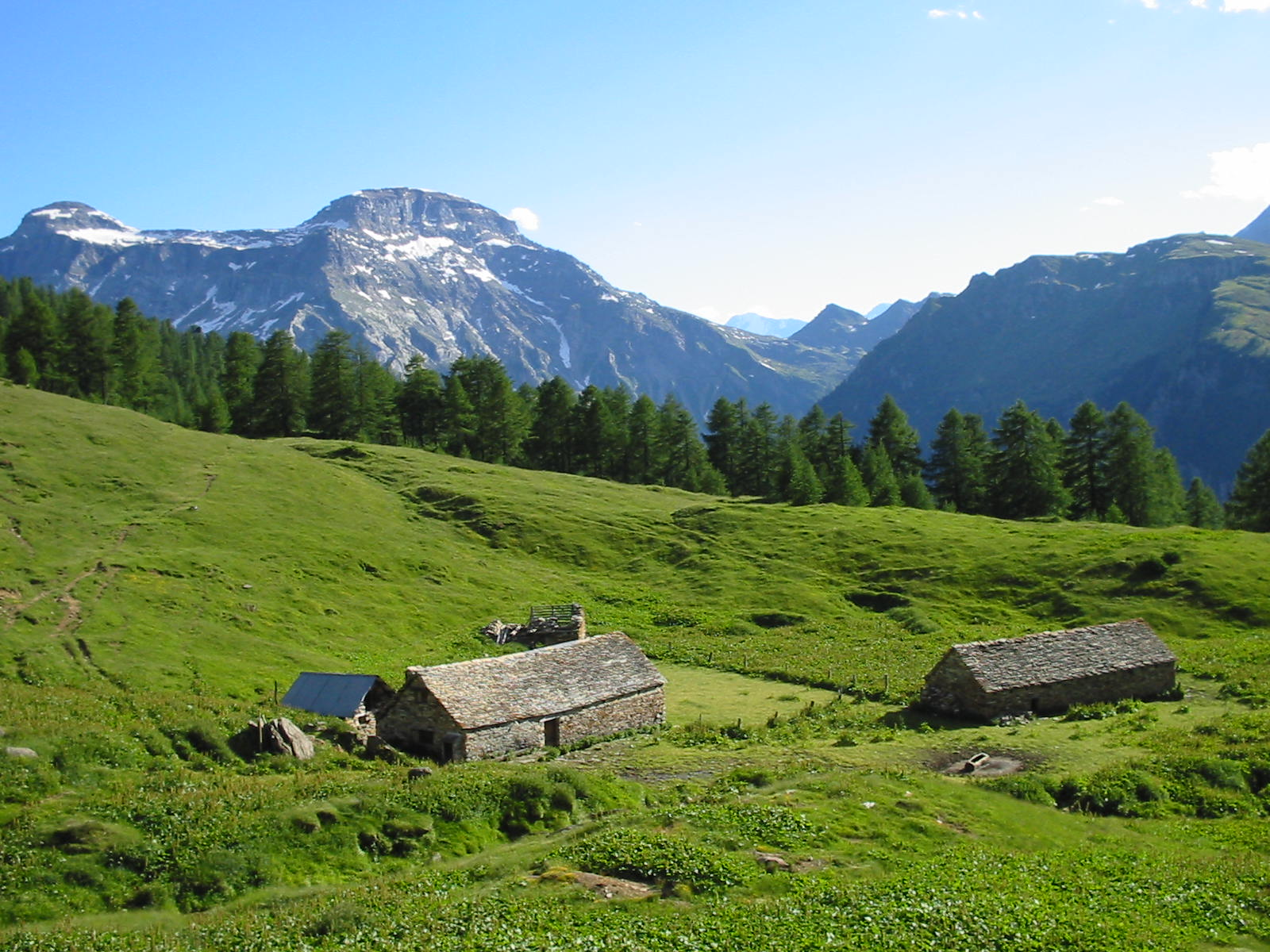
- Alpe Fontane, Devero
- Long-axis direction: Southeast

Geology
- Type: Glacial valley

Geography
- Country: Italy
- State/Province: Piedmont
- District: Province of Verbano-Cusio-Ossola
- Population center: Baceno
- Coordinates: 46°17′N 8°17′E
- Topo map: Lepontine Alps
- River: Devero
- Interactive map of Val Devero

The Val Devero is a valley located in the Val d'Ossola within the Province of Verbano-Cusio-Ossola in the Piedmont region of Italy.

== Geography ==
=== Topography ===
The Val Devero branches off from the Valle Antigorio at the commune of Baceno, its sole municipality, and widens toward its upper reaches. It forms a high-altitude plateau locally known as the Piana di Dèvero, which connects to the Alpe Veglia and Alpe Devero Natural Park.

The valley is renowned for its alpine lakes and artificial reservoirs used for hydroelectric power generation, including the Lago di Agaro, which submerged the former village of the same name, and the Lago di Devero (also known as Codelago), both popular summer tourist destinations.

During winter, the Piana di Dèvero transforms into a haven for cross-country skiing, featuring a 6 km (3.7 mi) circular trail and an 18 km (11 mi) trail leading to the Lago di Devero. Ski lifts are also available on the slopes of Mount Cazzòla.

=== Climate ===
The Val Devero features an alpine climate (Köppen Dfc), characterized by long, cold winters with abundant snowfall and short, cool summers with moderate precipitation. For the reference period 1971–2000 at the Alpe Devero station (elevation 1,634 m), the mean annual air temperature was 3.1°C, with total annual precipitation averaging 1,617mm. Of the approximately 123 rainy days per year, 38 are snowy, with an average maximum snow depth of 48cm and cumulative fresh snowfall of 537cm annually.

Winter (December–March) brings heavy snowfall, with average monthly snow precipitation of 81–85cm in December through February, and peak snow depths of 119cm in February and March. Snow cover typically lasts 183 days per year on average. Summers are mild, with temperatures rarely exceeding 15°C at higher elevations, though lower valley areas can be warmer.

Observational records indicate a warming trend consistent with broader Alpine climate change. The mean maximum temperature rose from 9.0°C (1961–2010) to 10.43°C (2011–2016), while the mean minimum increased from −1.7°C to 0.9°C over the same intervals. This has resulted in fewer frost days (from an average of 205 per year) and reduced snow persistence, despite occasional years of above-average accumulation (e.g., 684cm in 2013).

=== Geology ===
The Val Devero is notable for its diverse mineral deposits, including:

- Andradite
- Apatite
- Diopside
- Calcite
- Ilmenite
- Epidote
- Titanite

Within the valley's gneiss formations, the following minerals are found:

- Quartz
- Hematite
- Anatase
- Adularia
- Kyanite
- Garnet

== See also ==
- Val d'Ossola
- Alpe Veglia and Alpe Devero Natural Park
- Lepontine Alps
- Valle Antigorio
- Toce
- Italian Alps
