= Valle Antigorio =

Valley in Piedmonte, Italy

Coordinates: 46.2500°N 8.3250°E

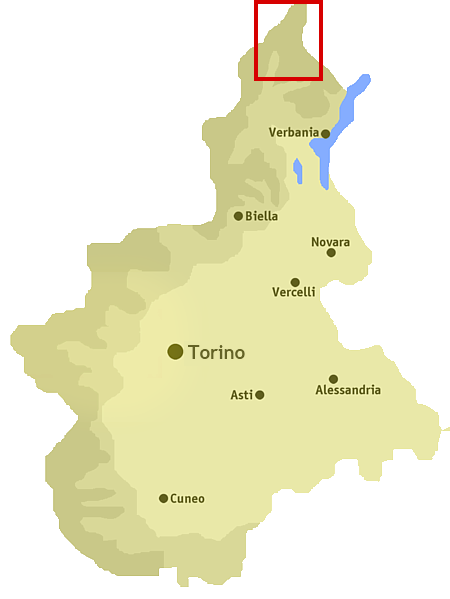
Valle Antigorio's location in the Piedmont region. Valle d'Ossola is immediately below and of similar size.

The Antigorio Valley is one of the Alpine valleys radiating from the Ossola Valley, in the region of Piedmont, northern Italy.

The Ossola Partisan Republic operated in the valley during its "Forty Days of Freedom" and the valley has a strong memory of it, including the massacre of escaping partisans at Goglio on 17 October 1944.

The valley is made up of the cities of: Formazza, Baceno (inside which the hamlet of Croveo is located), Premia, Crodo, Montecrestese, Varzo, Trasquera and Crevoladossola.

== Geography ==
The River Toce flows across the Antigorio Valley. The valley begins to the south, near Domodossola. It rises to the north, includes the towns of Crevoladossola, Crodo, Baceno and Premia, and it ends in the hamlet of Premia Chioso. As the valley continues to the north it is called Val Formazza. From the town of Baceno it opens to the north-west of the Valley Devero, from which Alpe Devero is reachable.

== Lago di Agaro ==
The valley contains the Lago di Agaro, an artificial lake created in 1937 by damming the Agaro River and flooding the former village of Agaro. The dam was built by the Edison company and was part of a larger project to increase regional energy production, as well as being part of the modernist project of the fascist state. Agaro was inhabited by transhumant pastoralists of the Walser ethnic group. They attempted to resist the construction of the dam, writing among other things a surviving letter that reads as follows:

Agaro is our sacred and inviolable domicile, recorded in history for at least seven centuries. This is not only our chosen home, but our only resource (made up of its meadows, fields, pastures and woods) […] If the construction of such a large basin were to be approved it would mean that we, who are submitting this appeal, would have to abandon our homes and our activity to which we are deeply attached because it nurtured us and our children […] How will our rights and interests be protected? Very likely by nobody, because we are poor mountain people and, given the altitude of our village, forgotten
