= Croveo =

Hamlet of Baceno, Italy

- Comune
- Comune di Croveo
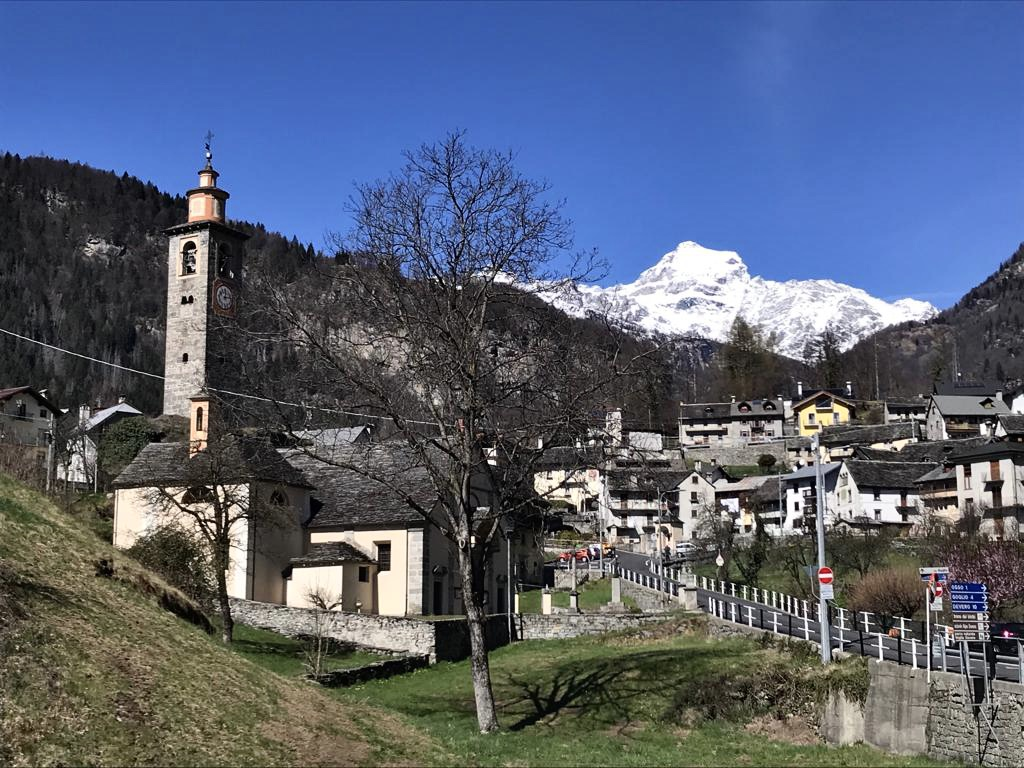
- View of the hamlet of Croveo in Baceno (VCO), Piedmont, Italy.

- Location within Italy Location within Piedmont
- Coordinates: 46°16′N 8°18′E
- Country: Italy
- Region: Piedmont
- Province: Verbano-Cusio-Ossola (VCO)

Government
  - Mayor: Andrea Vicini (Uniti per Baceno)

Area
  - Total: 11 km^{2} (4.2 sq mi)
- Elevation: 818 m (2,684 ft)

Population (1-1-2011)
  - Total: 231
  - Density: 21/km^{2} (54/sq mi)
- Time zone: UTC+1 (CET)
  - Summer (DST): UTC+2 (CEST)
- Postal code: 28861
- Dialing code: 0324
- Patron saint: Natività di Maria
- Saint day: 8 September

Croveo is a frazione of the comune (municipality) of Baceno in the province of Verbano-Cusio-Ossola, in the Italian region of Piedmont. Croveo is located 1.8 kilometres (1.1 mi) from Baceno, 40 kilometres (25 mi) from Verbania, and 113 kilometres (70 mi) from Turin, the capital city of Piedmont.

Croveo is known for its natural landscape, such as its falesia (a cliff used for rock climbing) and many walking trails. Croveo is historically associated with witches and the witch trials that took place there during the 16th century. This earned the hamlet the unofficial names of Paese delle Streghe (Town of the Witches in Italian) "Di Haggse van Croft" in Walser Titsch.

== History ==
=== Prehistory ===
The Balma del Capretto (Shelter of Baby Goat ) in Croveo is one of several prehistoric painted rock shelters in the Ossola valley. The name of the archaeological site comes from the fact that, when discovered, a baby goat was found inside the shelter. The painting represents a hunting scene and its subjects are two quadruped animals and a series of spirals. The exact age of the site is unknown but is presumed to be in the period between the Middle Neolithic and the Middle Copper Age. The red figures painted in the cave have almost completely disappeared: to preserve their heritage, the area is not open to the public.

On 28 November 1958, during the excavations for the creation of the sewage system in the village of Croveo, a tomb dating back to the 2nd century BC was discovered. In the tomb were found ceramic vases, a bronze clasp, an iron ax and sandals with nailed soles suitable for walking on mountain paths. This suggests that the place was already inhabited in that period. One of the reasons why this territory was populated in ancient times was its strategic position in between the two valleys of Devero Antigorio and Formazza. The valleys made the settlement naturally protected.

=== Middle Ages ===
Croveo and other municipal cities were established during the medieval era. The village was officially recognized by the Regnum Italiae in 918 CE.

In 1215, Emperor Otto IV invested the De Rodia family with the Antigorio Valley. Their possessions were later passed to the House of De Baceno, a family whose origins are narrated in Julius Caesar's De Bello Gallico. The De Baceno's domination lasted until 1381 when the Visconti of Milan took power over the entire Ossola Valley as well as a large part of northern Italy.

=== Early Modern Period ===
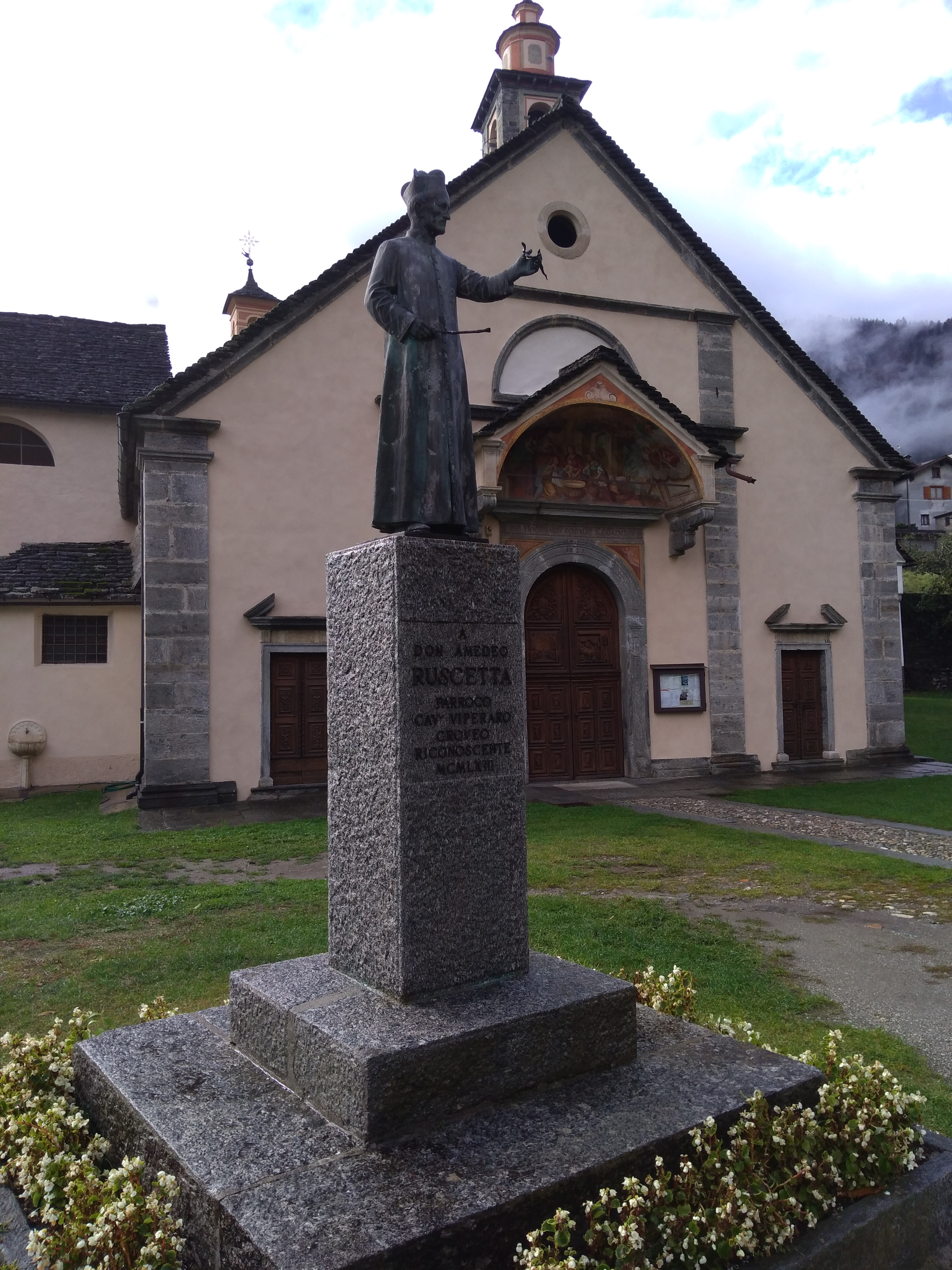
Churchyard of the parish church of Croveo, Italy

In 1450 the possession passed to the House of Sforza. In the 15th and 16th centuries the communitity of Croveo was affected by factional conflicts, plague epidemics and witch trials. In 1595, during the Spanish occupation, the feudal manor was assigned to the House of Borromeo. In 1647 the village of Croveo was declared exempt from enfeoffment.

In 1671 the Parish Church of Croveo was built and dedicated to the patron saint of the city. Its churchyard was later built in honor of Don Amedeo Ruscetta (also known as prete viperaio) and a rock cross was made in memory of the plague epidemic that occurred in 1630.

In the early 18th century the citizens of Croveo used frequent changes in the bishopric to unsuccessfully request independence from the city of Baceno.

==== 16th Century Factional struggles ====
In the 16th century the De Rodis-Baceno family from Croveo sided with the Brenneschi faction in the regional conflict in northern Piedmont between the Guelph and Ghibelline. In 1527, two members of the Brenneschi were assassinated by the Ponteschi and a truce was declared. The guilty were banished from the territory, their property confiscated and the peace of the valley was restored. At the end of the 16th century, the conflict restarted under the Spanish occupation when troops of the kingdom settled in the territory. In 1596, the parish priest Angelo Ronchi was murdered when leaving the church with the bishop Bescapè on a pastoral visit, causing the violence to start again. The situation was exacerbated by the behaviour of occupying Spanish troops.

==== 16th Century Witch Trials ====
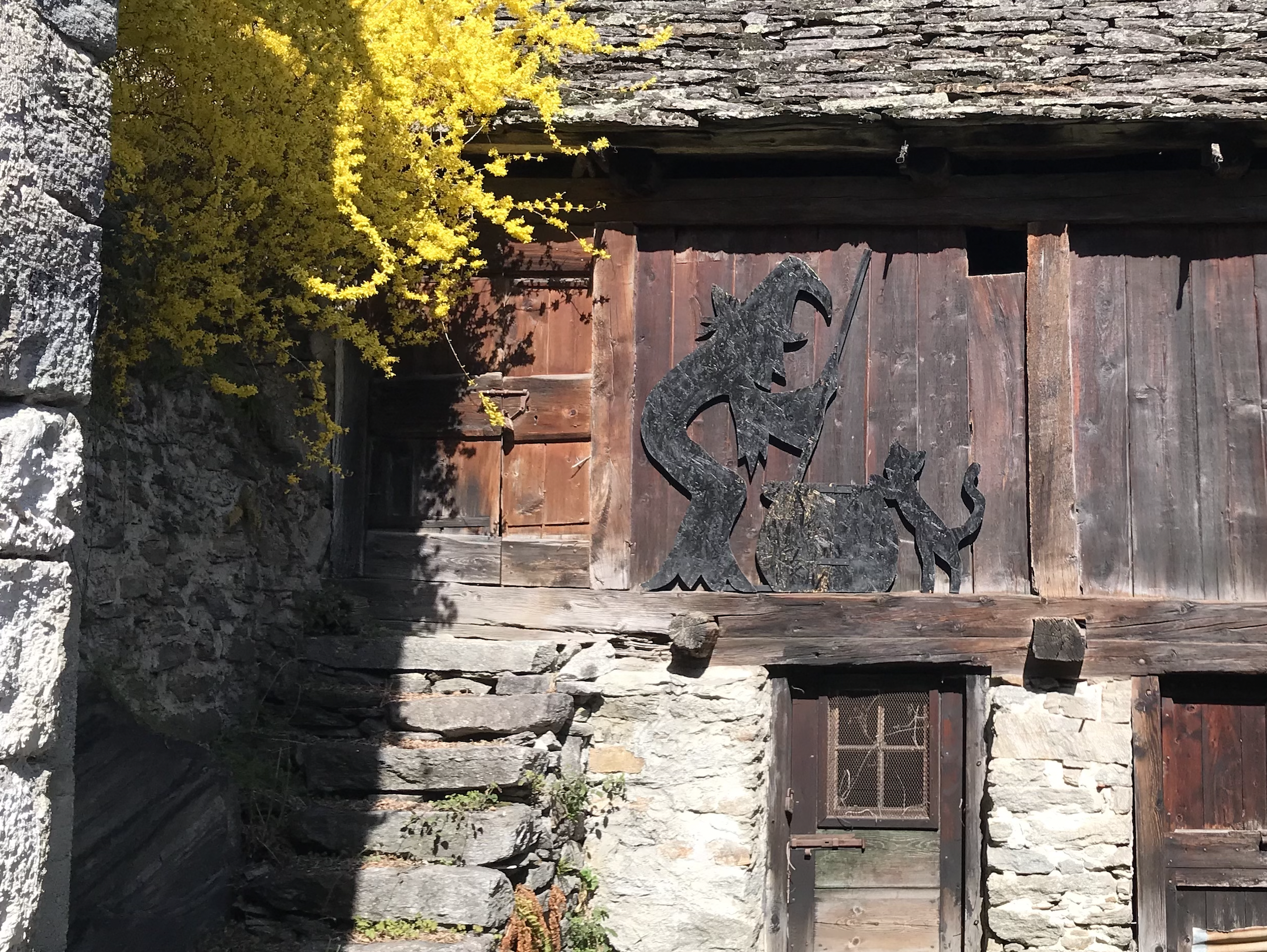
Wrought iron reproduction of a witch on a house in Croveo, Baceno (VCO)

In the 16th century there were a series of witch trials in Croveo. These were revealed in the 20th century by the priest Tullio Bertamini due to the discovery of a copy of one of the trials conducted by the inquisition in Novara in 1591, involving a woman from Montecrestese accused of witchcraft for supposedly bewitching a cow. This trial was later published by Bertamini in the magazine Illustrazione Ossolana.

Some of the more specific examples of witch trials in Croveo include Margherita Turchelli, widow of Jorio di Premia, who on 27 April 1519 was prosecuted by the inquisitor Friar Alberto Bossi of Novara from the Order of Preachers. She was suspected of heretical depravity and labeled as a witch and malevolent individual, and accused based on various prior information and evidence brought against her. She never confessed to the accusations and did not accept the sacrament of the Eucharist; rather, she spat upon it in scorn against God, choosing to worship the Devil instead. Alberto Bossi decreed that Margherita should be taken to the place of execution, bound with a rope, and subjected to torture in order for her to confess her sins. Turchelli ended up admitting her involvement in these activities related to black magic only after she was further tortured by being held up mid-air with a rope for an hour.

==== 16th and 17th Century Plague epidemics ====
From 1513 to 1630, Croveo and the surrounding region was struck by five epidemics of Bubonic plague. Since the territory was a point of reference for mercantile exchanges located almost at the border of Italian territory, many traveling merchants and foreigners facilitated the spread of viral diseases such as the Black Death.
The first plague victim of the epidemic of 1513 was a shepherd from Croveo who was suffering from a strong flu identified as being il castigo di dio (the punishment of God, another name given to the plague). From him the plague spread throughout the valley and caused over three hundred deaths. Further local outbreaks occurred in 1550, 1564, 1612 and during the 1629–1631 Italian plague. The final outbreak, which was also the most damaging, lasted for two years and is narrated in The Betrothed by Alessandro Manzoni.

=== Late Modern Period ===
During the 19th century the population and the economy of the village grew, facilitated by the settlement of pastoral communities throughout the valley. They introduced the production of dairy. The economy developed from agriculture to include manufacturing and mining. In 1860 the extraction of gold and asbestos began. In 1875 the first latteria turnaria (a factory that produced dairy produce) was built.

In 1864 the first musical band of the village was founded. The band started with a dozen instruments and until it reached over 40. Their repertoire includes traditional music, especially related to religion, and modern songs of that time. The band used to perform during popular and religious festivals and village fairs.

=== Contemporary History ===
During World War II, anti-fascist partisans retreated through Croveo and Baceno in an attempt to escape to Switzerland. On 17 October 1944, a group of partisans was massacred by the Nazis after a mechanical failure of a cable car halted their retreat. The few survivors were either captured and taken to concentration camps or managed to escape into the woods. The event is remembered every year by the citizens and a museum was built, in the village of Goglio, in honor of the deceased.

== Climate ==
Croveo is located inside Ossola, which belongs to the Lepontine Alps mountain system. The climate is typical of mountainous regions, especially in the higher region of Piedmont, and it is evident that its location has influenced the local flora and fauna. The climate has shaped and impacted human activities and local architecture, making them focused on withstanding the severe winter conditions and implementing new practices for the agricultural sector due to low average temperatures limiting the growing season for plants.

Croveo is in an "F" climate zone characterized by cold weather, especially during the winter season, with monthly average temperatures falling below freezing and heavy snowfall. Summers are usually cool, with monthly average temperatures rarely exceeding 18 °C (64 °F). Seasonal temperature variations can be significant.

=== Temperatures ===
Average monthly maximum and minimum temperature, Croveo, 2022
	January	February	March	April	May	June	July	August	September	October	November	December
Average maximum temperature	4,2°	4,96°	13,13°	14,1°	22,6°	25,2°	27,13°	26,35°	19,1°	18,1°	11,2°	5,6°
Average minimum temperature	-3°	-0,79°	0,48°	4,6°	11,2°	14,1°	16,58°	14,19°	9,1°	9,0°	3,2°	0,5°

=== Precipitations ===
Average monthly precipitation, Croveo, 2022
	January	February	March	April	May	June	July	August	September	October	November	December
Precipitation (millimiter)	25	5	50	100	100	50	20	150	125	250	100	5

=== Wind ===
Average monthly maximum wind values ( km/h ), Croveo, 2022
Month	January	February	March	April	May	June	July	August	September	October	November	December
Value (km/h)	45,6	60	17,1	32,1	14	20,1	17	17,7	18,5	18,4	31,2	23,8

Average monthly minimum wind values ( km/h ), Croveo, 2022
Month	January	February	March	April	May	June	July	August	September	October	November	December
Value (km/h)	11,2	12,4	3	7,2	2,1	4,5	4	2,3	4,2	1,4	3	2,2

Average monthly wind values ( km/h ), Croveo, 2022
Month	January	February	March	April	May	June	July	August	September	October	November	December
Value (km/h)	20,2	29,5	6	18,7	7,12	11,3	9,1	7,1	11,6	7,1	26,7	9,4

== Nature ==
Croveo is located in the Alpe Veglia and Alpe Devero Natural Park covering a surface area of 8539 hectares and including peaks that range from 1600 to 3553 m.a.s.l.. It is managed by three municipalities: Trasquera, Credo and Baceno. It maintains and preserves a multitude of habitats.

Above 1200 m.a.s.l. the forests are mostly composed of larch and red pine with blueberries and rhododendrons in their brushwood. At lower altitudes around the village, rare chestnut woods have been able to survive in abandoned pasture land.

In the valley floor forests of beech and birch prevail, while at high altitudes, up to about 2,200 meters above sea level, the main species are alders, willows, sorbs and spruces. Inside Croveo's geographical area approximately 320 botanical species have been identified, most of the which are considered rare, such as gentian (Gentiana brachyphylla), astragalus (Astragalus (plant) leontinus) and cobrenia (Kobrenia simpliciscula).

Local fauna includes wild boars, chamois, marmots, sheep, goats and Alpine hares. The valley floor is inhabited by deer, roe deer, foxes and other small mammals, such as badgers and squirrels.

Bird life includes golden eagles and black grouse.

== Demographics ==
=== Population ===
Type of population	Quantity
Total	231
Males	119
Females	112
Married	87
Divorced	1

The official estimated population of Croveo in 2011 was 231, according to ISTAT, the official Italian statistical agency, consisting of 119 males and 112 females, with 87 married and 1 divorced.

=== Age distribution ===
The age distribution of Croveo's citizens can be divided as follows in the table:

Age distribution, Croveo 2011
Age	<5	5-9	10-14	15-19	20-24	25-29	30-34	35-39	40-44	45-49	50-54	55-59	60-64	65-69	70-74	>74
Quantity	9	3	8	11	10	11	12	18	18	26	13	14	17	14	15	32

=== Foreign population ===
Croveo is home to 9 people from foreign countries, divided as follows:

Foreign population, Croveo, 2011
Type	Total	Males	Females
Quantity	9	4	5

With an age distribution divided as follows:

Age distribution, Croveo, 2011
Age	0-29	30-54	>54
Quantity	3	4	2

=== Education ===
Education level, Croveo, 2011
Type of population	Higher education + university and non-university diplomas	High school diploma	Lower secondary education	Elementary school license	Males with university degree	Males with high school diploma	Males with lower secondary education	Males with elementary school license
Quantity	13	66	67	73	4	41	40	33

== Administration ==
Coveo is administered by a mayor, a deputy mayor and a local council, with 10 majority councillors. In 2023 these included:

- Mayor: Andrea Vicini, affiliated with the political party "United for Baceno" and born in Domodossola on 15 April 1972.
- Deputy Mayor: Stefano Costa (responsible for European projects, waste, tourism and local projects)
- Majority councillor: Graziano Villiborghi (oversees Public Works)
- Other majority councillors:

- Elena Beltrami (library, children's welfare)
- Maria Dattrino (culture, interculture and cemetery services)
- Dino Della Maddalena (civil protection, forests and paths)
- Paolo Ferrari (Ente Parco and frazioni)
- Marco Gallacci (agriculture, hunting and wild boar containment)
- Diego Noretta (waste disposal)
- Paolo Sartori (sport, cultural and voluntary associations)
- Martina Signorini (tourism and relationship with Pro Loco).

- Municipal secretary: Giovanni Boggi.

== Buildings and Architecture ==
Most of the buildings in Croveo are over 100 years old, with further new buildings constructed regularly in the period: 1919 - 1980. From the 1980s new building construction declined significantly.

Dates of New Building Construction, Croveo, 2011
Year of construction	Built before 1919	Built between 1919 and 1945	Built between 1946 and 1960	Built between 1961 and 1970	Built between 1971 and 1980	Built between 1981 and 1990	Built between 1991 and 2000	Built between 2001 and 2005	Built after 2005	Total
Quantity	82	30	25	23	18	4	3	2	5	192

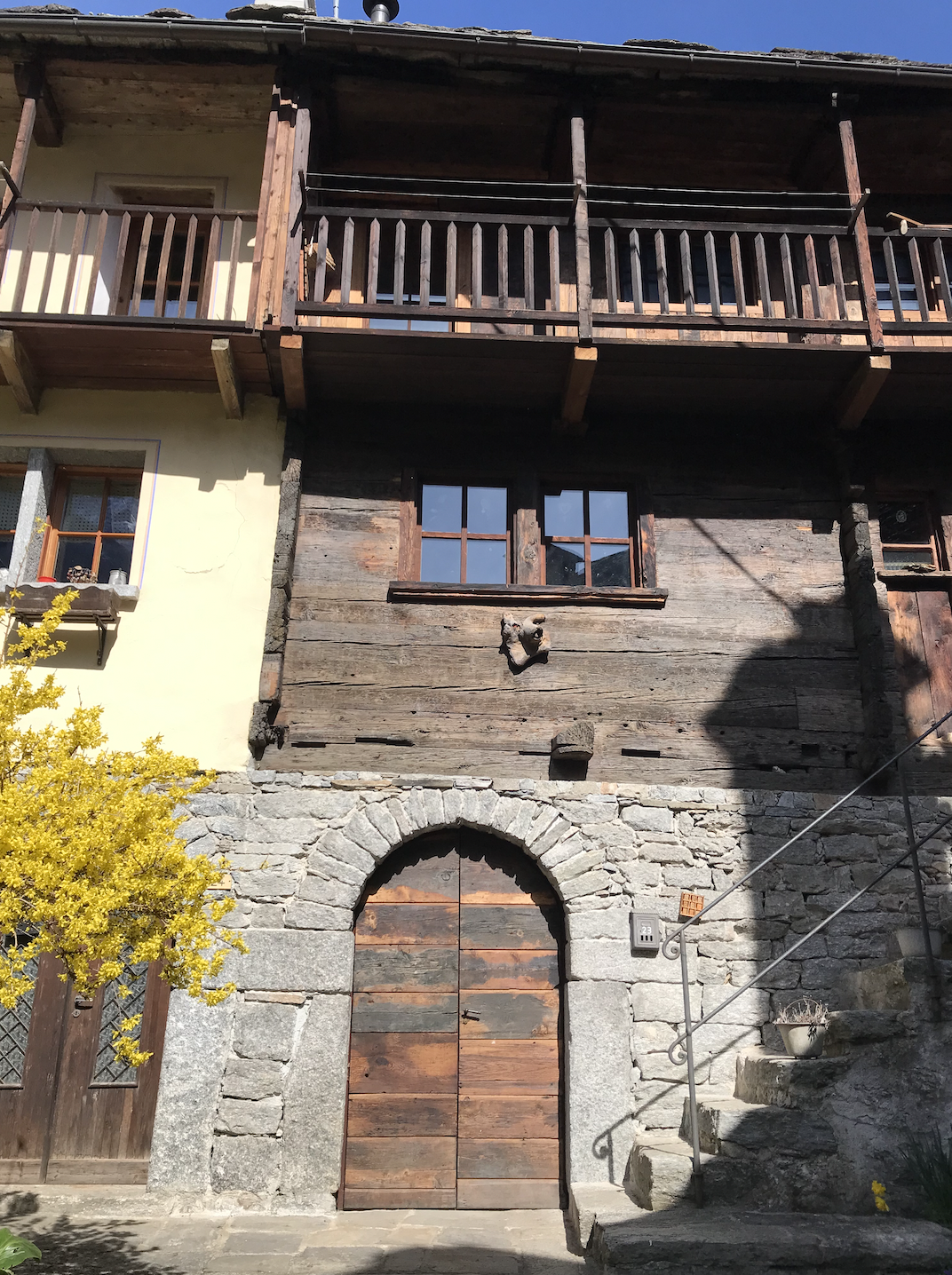
Traditional house in Croveo, Baceno (VCO), Italy

The oldest buildings in Croveo dates from the 16th century to the middle of the 17th century. They are characterised with squared stone elements, including B-type doors and windows. The doors have vertical jambs with a slab of a large stone block at its top, on which the lintel rests. Indicative of this period is a building dated 1564 according to the engraving on the lintel. The building has three floors plus an attic; on the facade of the ground floor there is a B-type portal, next to two symmetrical small windows. The two upper floors have three identical windows each, perfectly aligned with the openings on the ground floor. There are also windows with a rectangular shape but with the major axis horizontal. These windows exhibit the traditional formal characteristics of type B openings but with approximately double the width, associated with canonical-type windows.

The modern use of buildings in Croveo are predominantly residential in purpose.

Buildings by Usage, Croveo, 2011
Type	In use	For residential use	For commercial use (business, tourism, and other purposes )	Total
Quantity	199	192	7	200

== Monuments ==
=== Church of the Nativity of the Virgin Mary ===
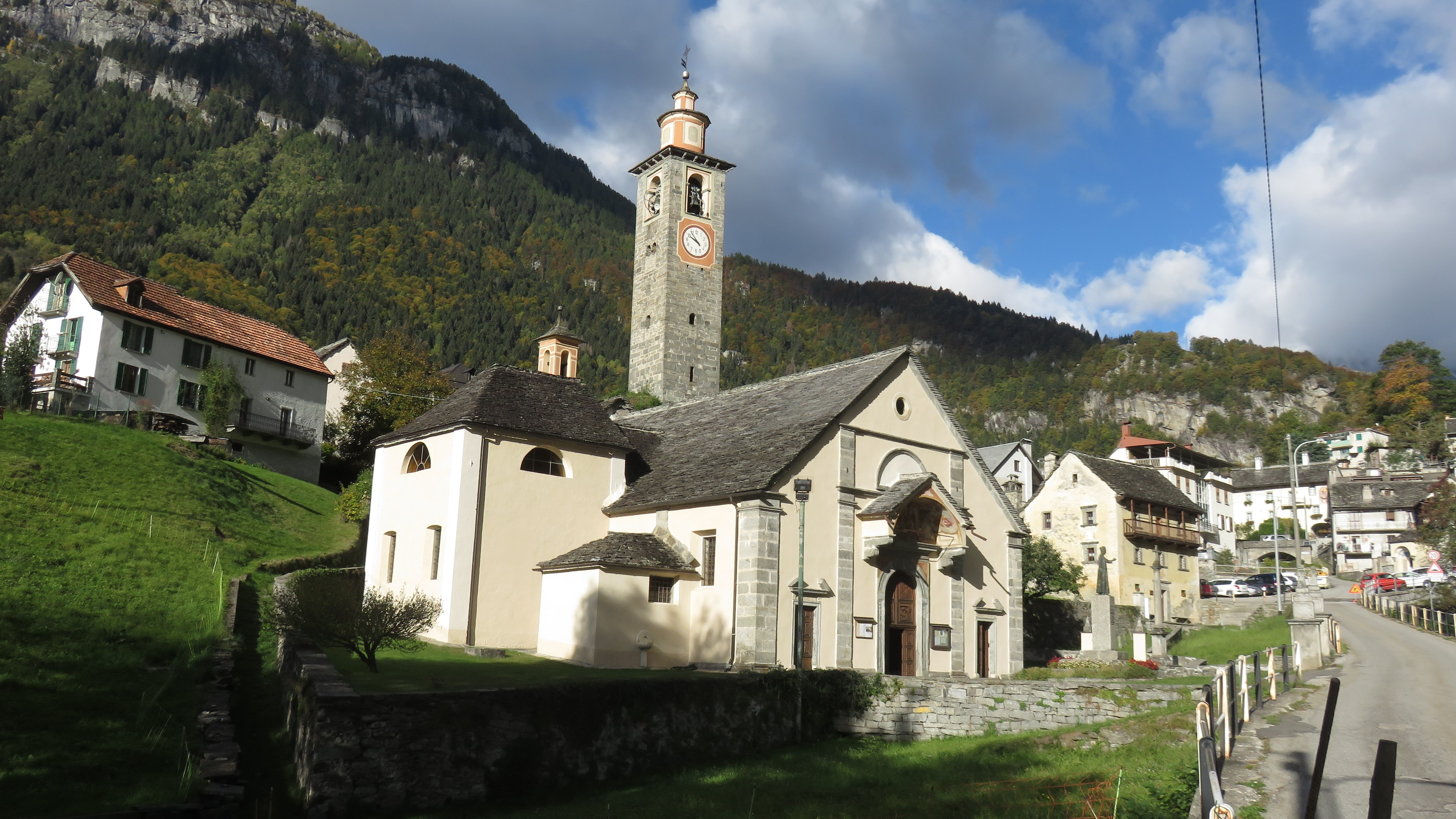
Parish Church of Croveo, Italy

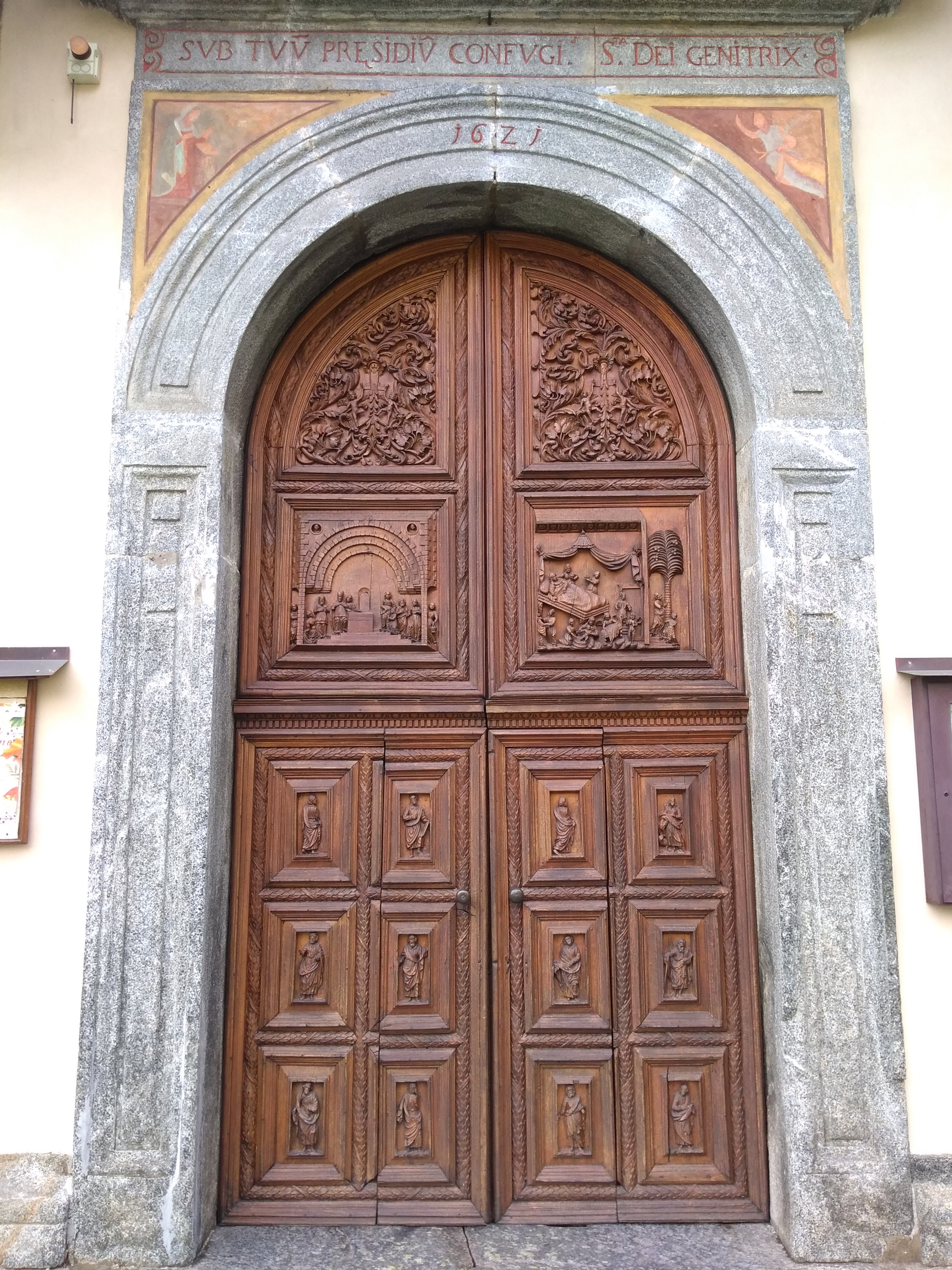
Nativity of the Virgin Mary and the twelve Apostles on the principal wooden door of the Parish Church of Croveo, Italy

The Parish Church of Croveo was built in 1671 and is dedicated to the Nativity of the Virgin Mary.

A characteristic of this church is that its bell tower is built on a rock fallen in a landslide from the hillside above.

The church is structured on three naves, two side chapels and five altars.

The art pieces are:

- The Nativity of the Virgin Mary and the Twelve Apostles carved in wooden doors at the front entrance of the church.
- A cross made of stone commemorating the 1629–1631 Italian plague.

=== Croveo's Torchio ===
Croveo's Torchio (winepress) stands on a stone building leaning against a large rock that forms one of its walls. The structure is formed by a large beam eight meters long, with a grinding stone. It was used for pressing fruits such as grapes, apples and pears.

=== The Croveo Barrier ===
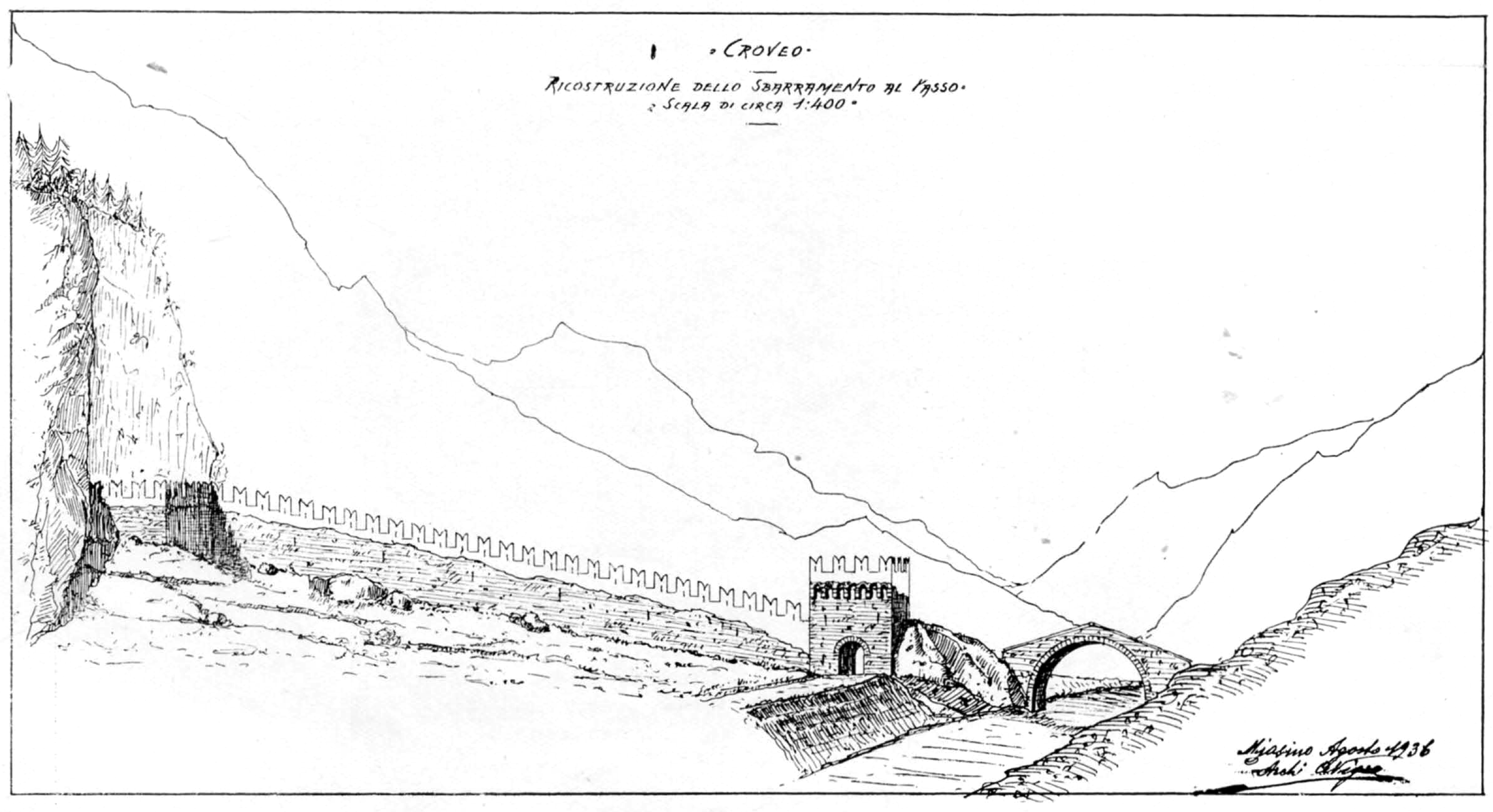
Reconstruction of the barrage of Croveo, Italy

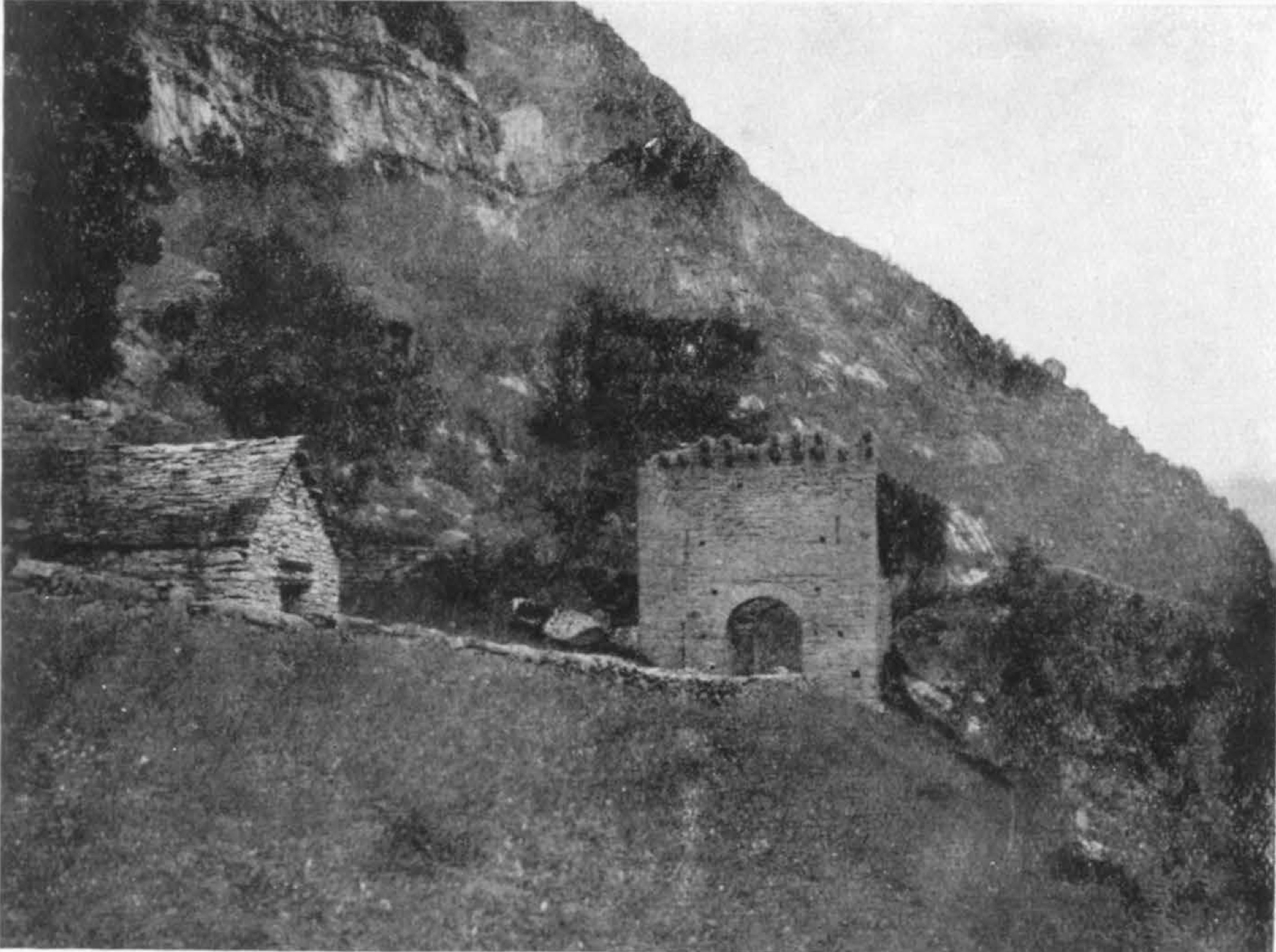
Barrage of Croveo, Italy, facing west

The Croveo Barrier was constructed in the 16th century in the Antigorio Valley as a defensive system for communication with nearby villages. Smoke and fire were used to raise the alarm and prepare for defense. The barrier system had three key points: the Baceno Tower, the bell tower of Croveo and the barricade at the Passo. The barricade at the Passo was built on three floors with a double arched door. It was also used as a checkpoint for collecting goods and payments from caravans of merchants passing Croveo on the way to Switzerland.

=== The House of the Chaplain and the Amedeo Ruscetta Museum ===
The House of the Chaplain ("Chià dul Caplan") is a stone structure dated 1607, situated next to the Parish Church. The building has been restored by the Parish of Croveo in collaboration with the Municipal Administrations of Baceno. Financial and operational support came from the 'Costume Group' of Baceno and the 'CoEUR 'In the Heart of the European Trails' project, an international initiative aimed at connecting major European trails, such as the Via Francigena and the Camino de Santiago de Compostela, with tourist-devotional and diverse spiritual routes within the Italian and Swiss regions.

The building is now used as a museum dedicated to sacred art and rural civilization. On its inauguration on 19 July 2015 it was officially named after Don Amedeo Ruscetta, the priest known for his expertise in handling serpents.

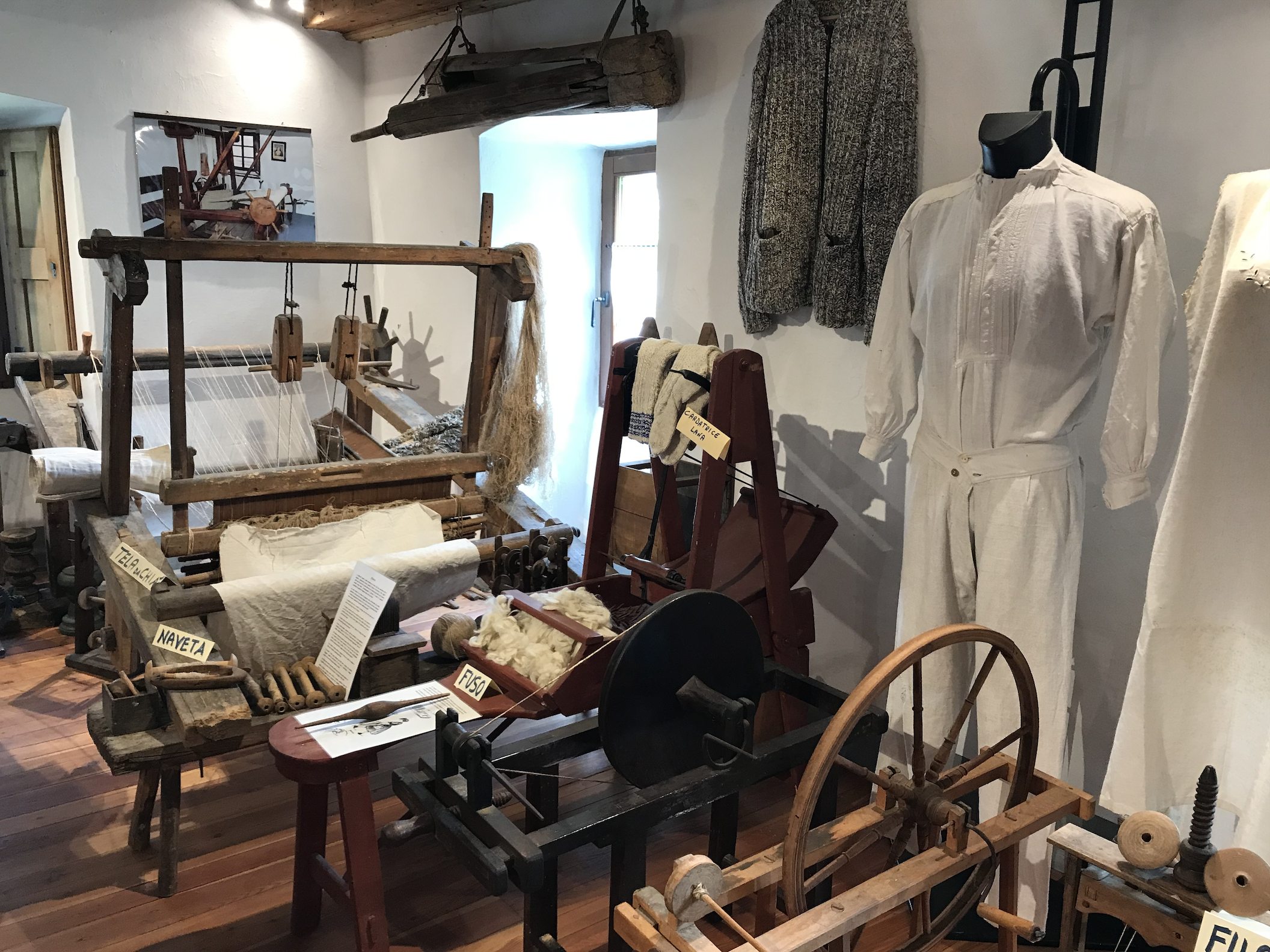
Room inside the House of the Chaplain and the Amedeo Ruscetta Museum in Croveo, Baceno (VCO)

The museum has three floors:

- The first floor contains aspects of rural culture, featuring tools and implements used in local crafts.
- The second floor is dedicated to sacred art. It contains a collection of ancient garments worn by Croveo's women and costumes worn during the village festival processions. It has a collection of sacred vestments, some of which date back to the 17th century and were donated by the Croveo confraternities who had relocated to Rome. It has an exhibition of a Corpus Christi procession, complete with liturgical paraphernalia.
- The third floor is dedicated to Don Amedeo Ruscetta, featuring a reconstructed room resembling the quarters of the former parish priest with his original bed, a gift from Father Carlo. An exhibit showcases preserved specimens of vipers and other animals, which reflect the priest's passion for herpetology.

=== War memorial ===
The memorial was dedicated on April 11, 1920, in memory of the Croveo inhabitants who lost their lives in World War I. It has four sides, each with a panel indicating the names of the 21 fallen soldiers. The sculpture is made of a granite stone obelisk with a pyramidal base and it is surmounted by two sculptures.

== Amenities ==
There is a fire station and two shops: a pharmacy and a boutique. There are two restaurants offering typical northern food. There is also a B&B.

== Tourism and Sport Activities ==
=== Village Festivals ===
There are a range of annual events in Croveo:

- The Festival of the Witches of Croveo (La Festa Delle Streghe Di Croveo).
- The Mele Miele festival, an autumn tourist event where visitors can taste apples and honey picked by local farmers and beekeepers.
- The patronal festival of Croveo, which is held on the second Sunday of September to celebrates the Nativity of Mary.
- The Goat in Croveo - "Craf in Crof"- fair takes place in November where Piedmont's traditional goat and sheep breeds are exhibited alongside the products derived from their breeding.

=== Agritourism ===
Croveo has an agritourism center called "Alpe Crampiolo", which is open to the public to see local dairy production, including cheese making and milk production. There is a resort called "Beola di Croveo".

=== Rock Climbing ===
Croveo has a sports-climbing cliff with a selection of approximately 25 bolted routes in the grades of F5b - F7b. The rock is gneiss. The cliff is south-facing and situated 926 metres (3,038 ft) above sea level. The cliff can be accessed by a 5-minute walk from Croveo village. The climbs are suited to families and also include harder climbs, such as Bianco at the grade of F8a.

The Via Ferrata Walserfall ascends the rocky wall near the Agàro Waterfall, reaching Piodacalva, a cluster of cabins and barns above the rocky bastion. The access trail (code H00 up to Osso) is marked by specific trail markers. The first half of the Via Ferrata has a modest slope, and with a cable acts as a handrail. Later on the trail, there is a long vertical slab called the Muro della Cascata (Waterfall Wall), where footholds make the ascent easier. After completing this slab, there is the Cengia della Cascata (Ledge of the Waterfall), followed by the beginning of the second section of the Via Ferrata, which starts at the Muro dei Tetti (Roof Wall), where the path becomes steep. Following this section, there are two more vertical portions known as the Muro dello Specchio (Mirror Wall) and the Muro del Nano (Dwarf's Wall), both equipped with metal footholds to facilitate climbing.

=== Cycling ===
The mountain bike route Via di Squettar starts at Baceno and continues though Croveo, passing by the hamlet's giant's kettle and its historic centre. This trail is 18 kilometres (11 mi) long and takes 3 to 6 hours to complete.

=== Hiking ===
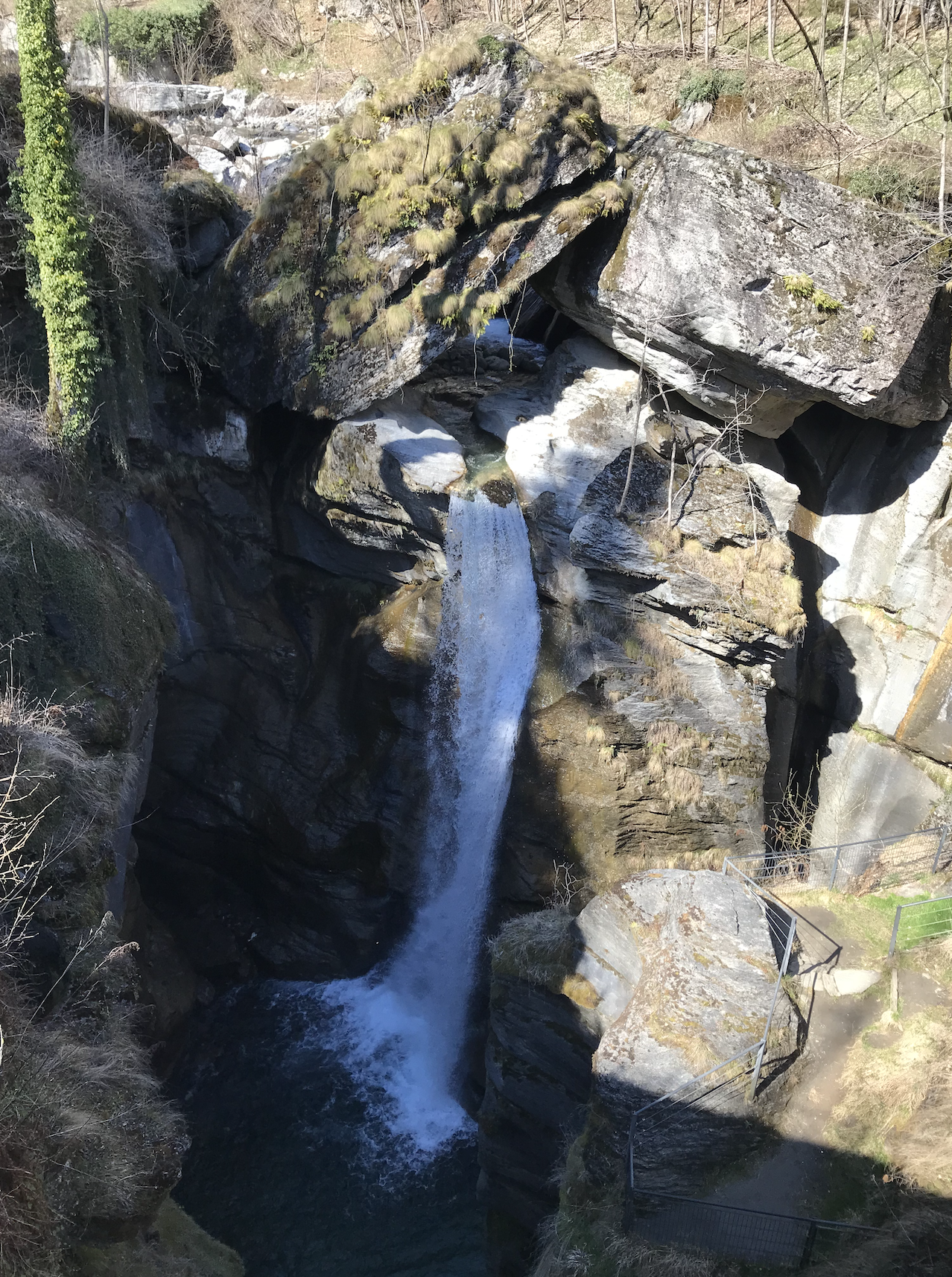
Le Caldaie del Diavolo (The Devil's Cauldrons) in Croveo, Italy

The ancient track Croveo Tour (Giro di Croveo) is 5 kilometres (3.1 mi) long and has an altitude difference of 213 metres (699 ft). The trail ultimately leads to the Arbola Pass and it has fostered trade between the Devero Valley and the Binn Valley throughout the centuries. Carved into the rock, a mule track was established to facilitate the passage of pack animals.

The Witch Trail (Percorso delle Streghe) route, which starts in Baceno, leads to The Devil's Cauldrons (Le Caldaie del Diavolo) and is also accessible in winter with the help of snowshoes. The length of the track is 4.7 kilometres (2.9 mi) and the elevation gain is 250 metres (820 ft). This track is considered suitable for walkers of all abilities.

In the North of Croveo there is a walking route to Agaro Lake, historically known for Agaro village which was submerged by 20 million liters of water. In 1936 Enel, built a dam to create an artificial lake to supply the nearby villages. The track has an elevation gain of 782 metres (2,566 ft), a length of 9 kilometres (5.6 mi) and a duration of 4 hours and 45 minutes.

== Curiosities ==
=== Don Amedeo Ruscetta ===
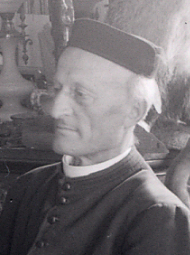
Don Amedeo Ruscetta, Priest of Croveo

Don Amedeo Ruscetta was born shortly after the Unification of Italy, in Artò. In his youth he accidentally discovered vipers while searching for blackbird nests. This encounter sparked his passion for the study and capture of snakes (herpetology).

During the first half of the 20th century, the priest lived and worked in Croveo. After each mass he would gather children round the church and hold lessons on hunting vipers.

His closest collaborator, Diovuole Proletti, recalled in an article in La Stampa, that by the late 1950s they were able to earn up to 500 lire for each specimen of viper venom.

Traditionally, vipers were sent by mail to the Pasteur Institute in Paris. When French customs regulations made it impossible to send live reptiles by post, Ruscetta and Proletti devised a method that involved opening the viper's mouths and having them bite a sponge so that the crystallized venom, once collected, could be sent in accordance with French regulations. This method was also used to supply the Serotherapy Institute of Milan.

On his tombstone, Don Amedeo Ruscetta insisted on having inscribed a specific sentence:

Sacerdote Amedeo Ruscetta – viperaio, parroco di Croveo – operoso leale faceto ospitale: maestro piacevole di fede e scienza attraverso la natura a Dio portò popoli e fedeli. – L’anima preclara – mover si volse tornando al suo regno.

=== The Children's Train ===
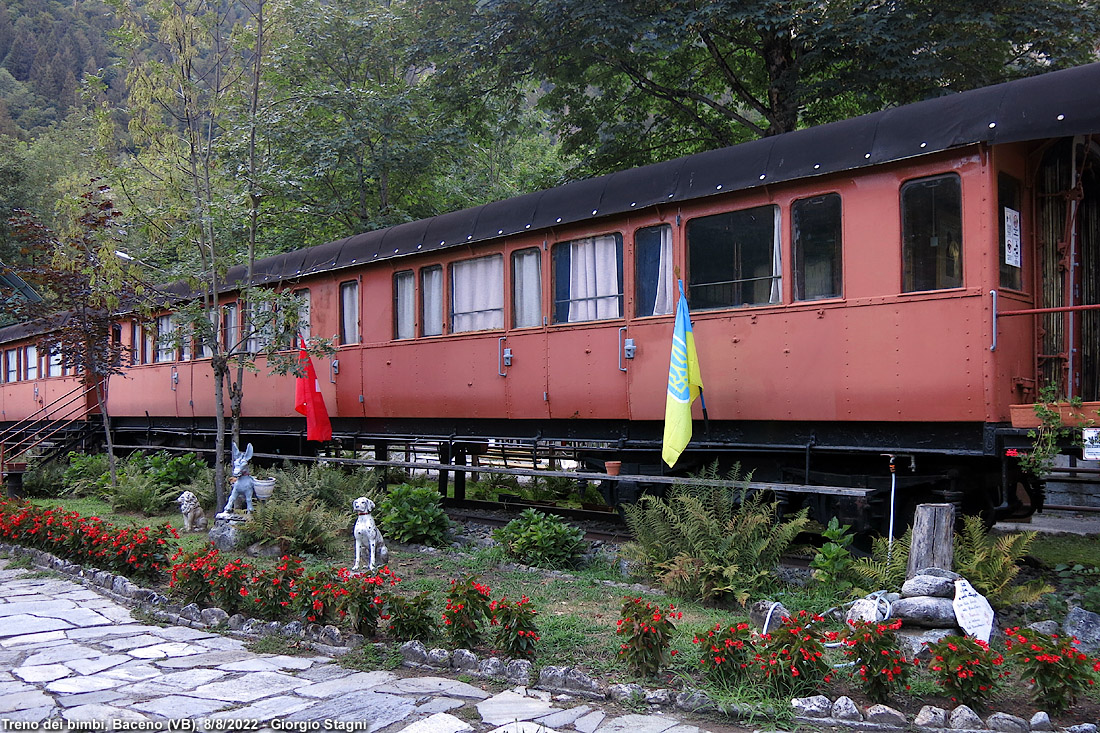
The Children's Train, Croveo, Italy

The "Children's Train" is a tourist village located in the woods of Croveo and it is managed by the Capuchin Friars of Domodossola. The Children's Train village was created in 1966 when the friar Michelangelo Falcioni was looking for a place to spend the summer with the children hosted by the church. The Minister of Transportation Luigi Scalfaro donated the train carriages.

This village is composed of old train carriages that have been transformed into different rooms and now hosts groups, scouts and families from all over Italy. It is managed by volunteers.

== See also ==
- Ossola – Valley in Italy
- Valle Antigorio – Valley in Piedmonte, Italy
- Italian resistance movement – Italian combatant organizations opposed to Nazi-Fascism
- Witch trials – Search for witchcraft or subversive activity

== Gallery ==
Pictures of Croveo
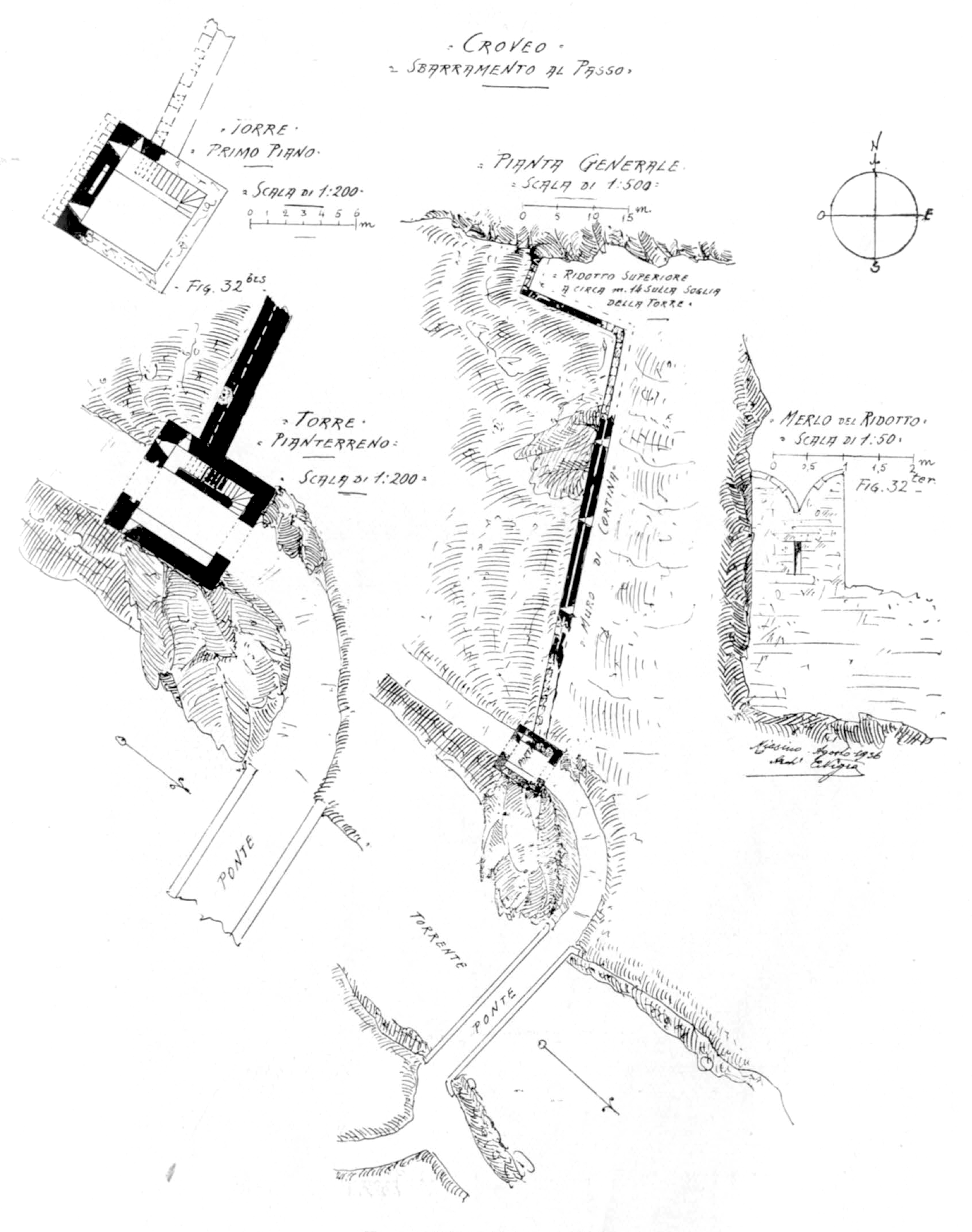
Reconstruction of the barrage of Croveo, Italy (2)

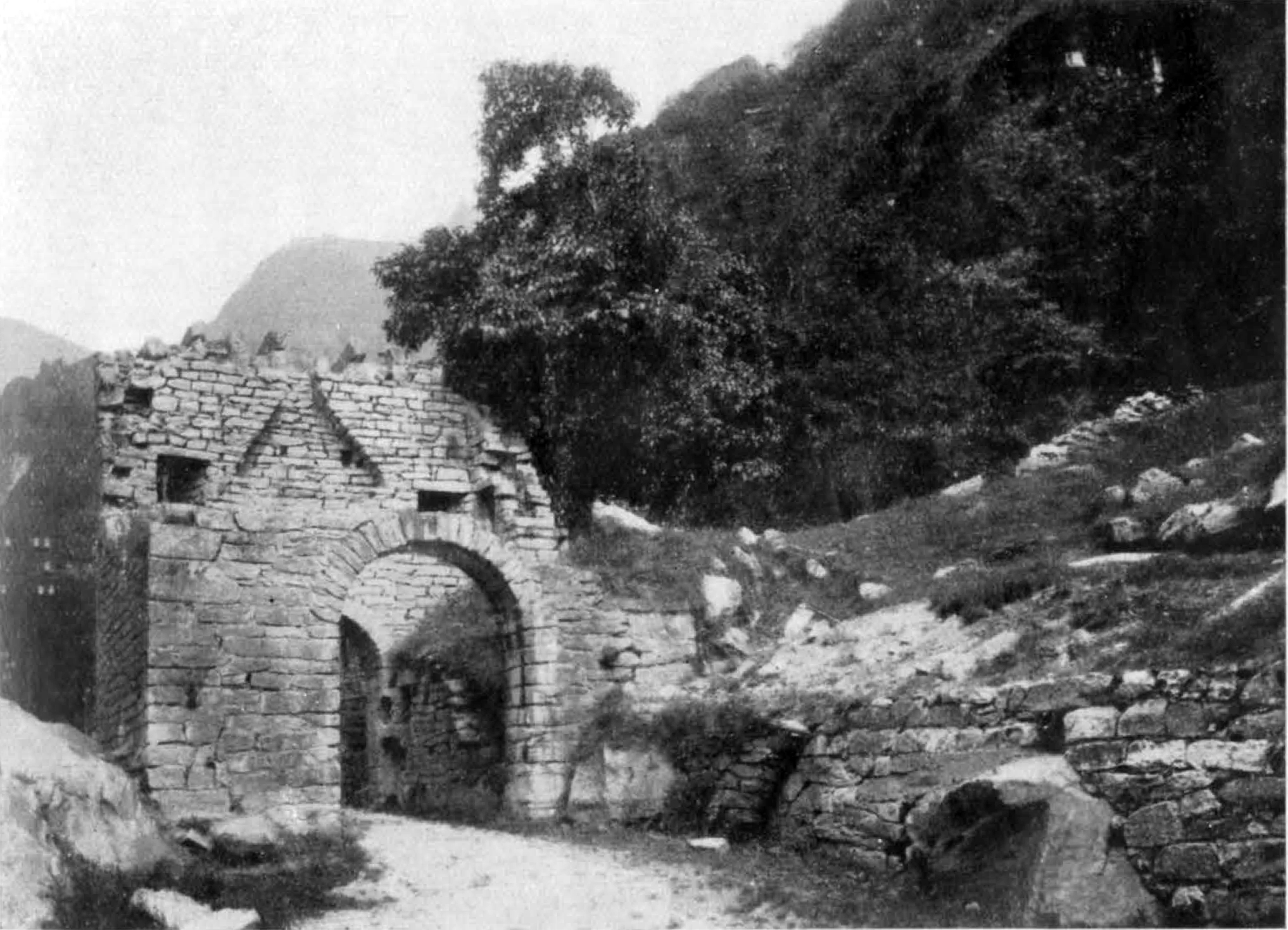
Barrage of Croveo, Italy, facing east

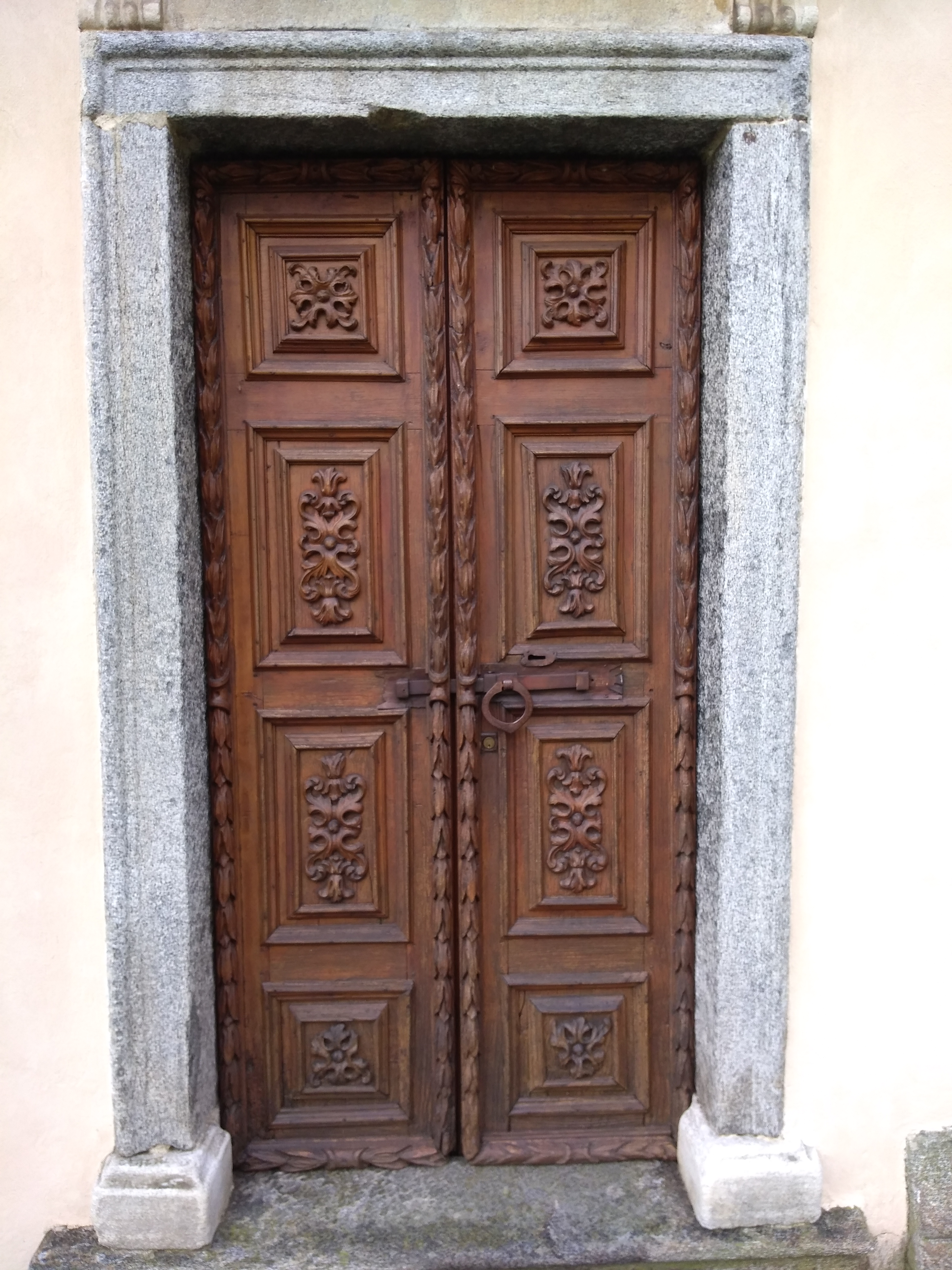
Right side wooden door of the Parish Church of Croveo, Italy, representing the Nativity of Mary
