= Lake Devero =

Artificial lake in Piedmont, Italy

Lake Dévero
- Lago di Dévero
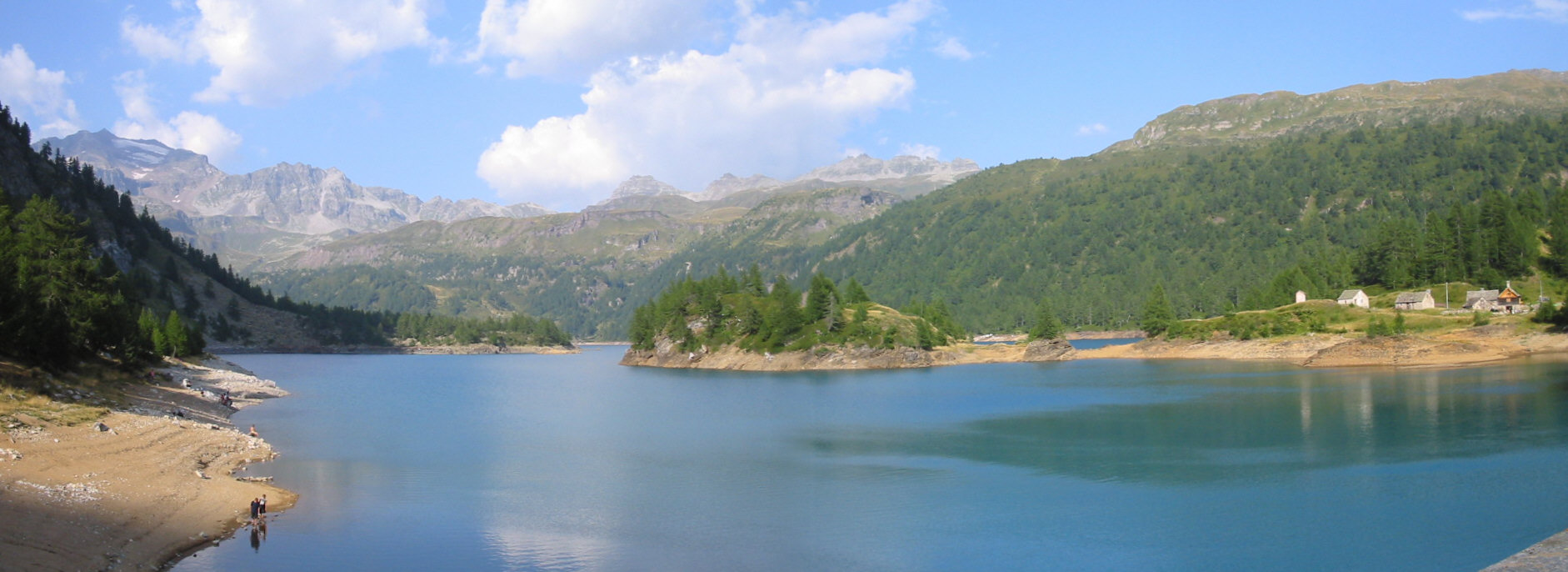
- Interactive map of Lake Dévero
- Location: Baceno, Province of Verbano-Cusio-Ossola, Piedmont, Italy
- Coordinates: 46°18′36″N 8°15′36″E
- Type: Artificial
- Primary inflows: Rio d'Arbola
- Primary outflows: Rio d'Arbola
- Catchment area: 25.73 km^{2} (9.93 sq mi)
- Surface area: 1 km^{2} (0.39 sq mi)
- Average depth: 20 m (66 ft)
- Max. depth: 40 m (130 ft)
- Water volume: 0.016 km^{3} (0.0038 cu mi)
- Surface elevation: 1,856 m (6,089 ft)
- Frozen: In winter
- Islands: Yes

The Lake Dévero or Codelago (from the Ossolano dialect lac d'co d'lag, meaning lake at the head of the lake) is an artificial lake in the Province of Verbano-Cusio-Ossola, located at 1,856 m (6,089 ft) above sea level within the Alpe Veglia and Alpe Devero Natural Park.

== Characteristics ==
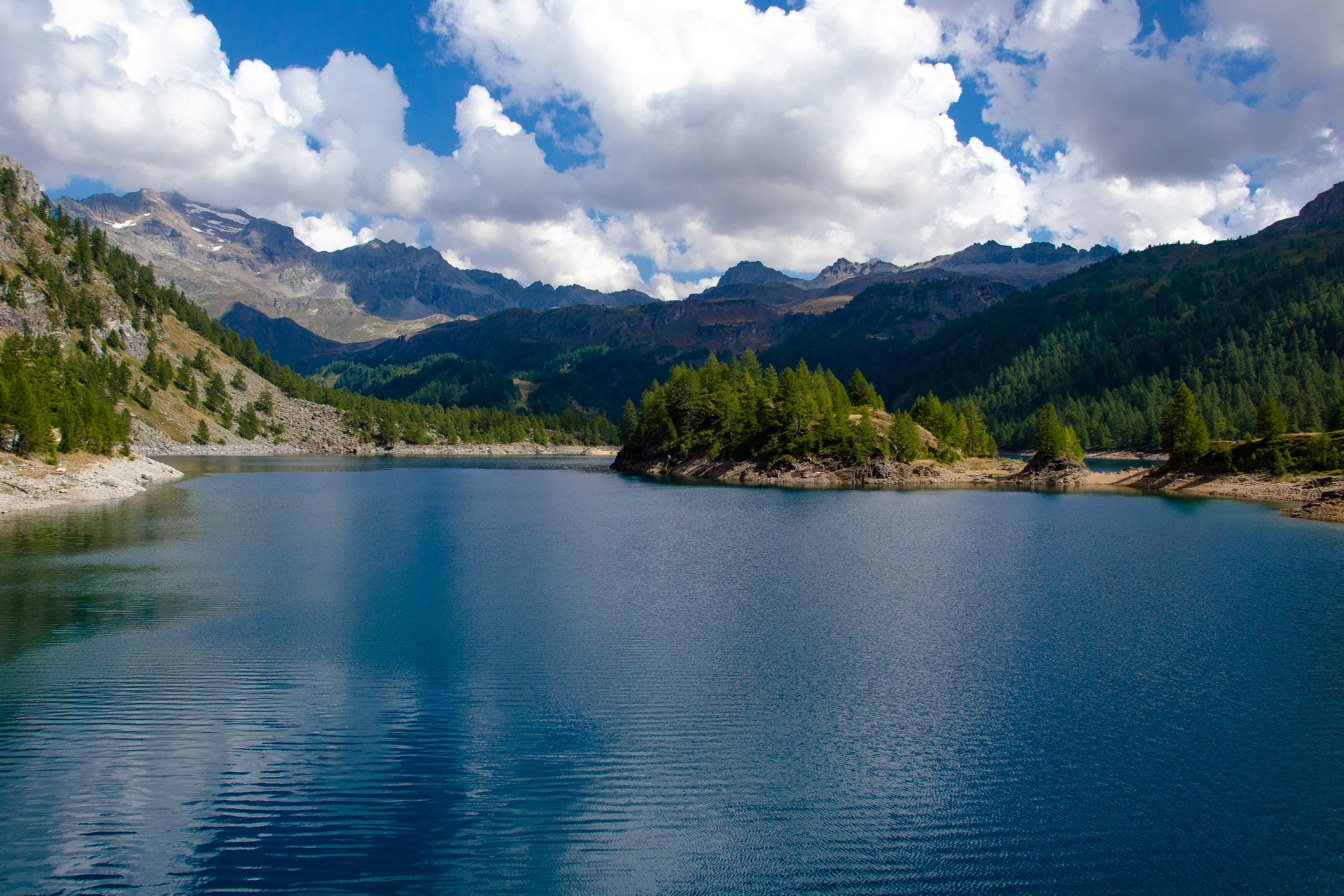
The Lago di Dévero seen from the dam.

It appears today as a large lake basin surrounded by vast forests of larches and is a destination for numerous tourists both during the summer and in the winter period, when it is possible to cross the frozen lake equipped with snowshoes or skis. Several trekking routes are available, starting from Alpe Devero and Crampiolo, which skirt the lake along its entire perimeter.

The basin feeds the Devero hydroelectric plant.

== History ==
The dam was constructed in two phases: between 1908 and 1912 and between 1921 and 1924. On the left orographic side of the Montorfano, during the same years, the small Forcoletta dam was also built.

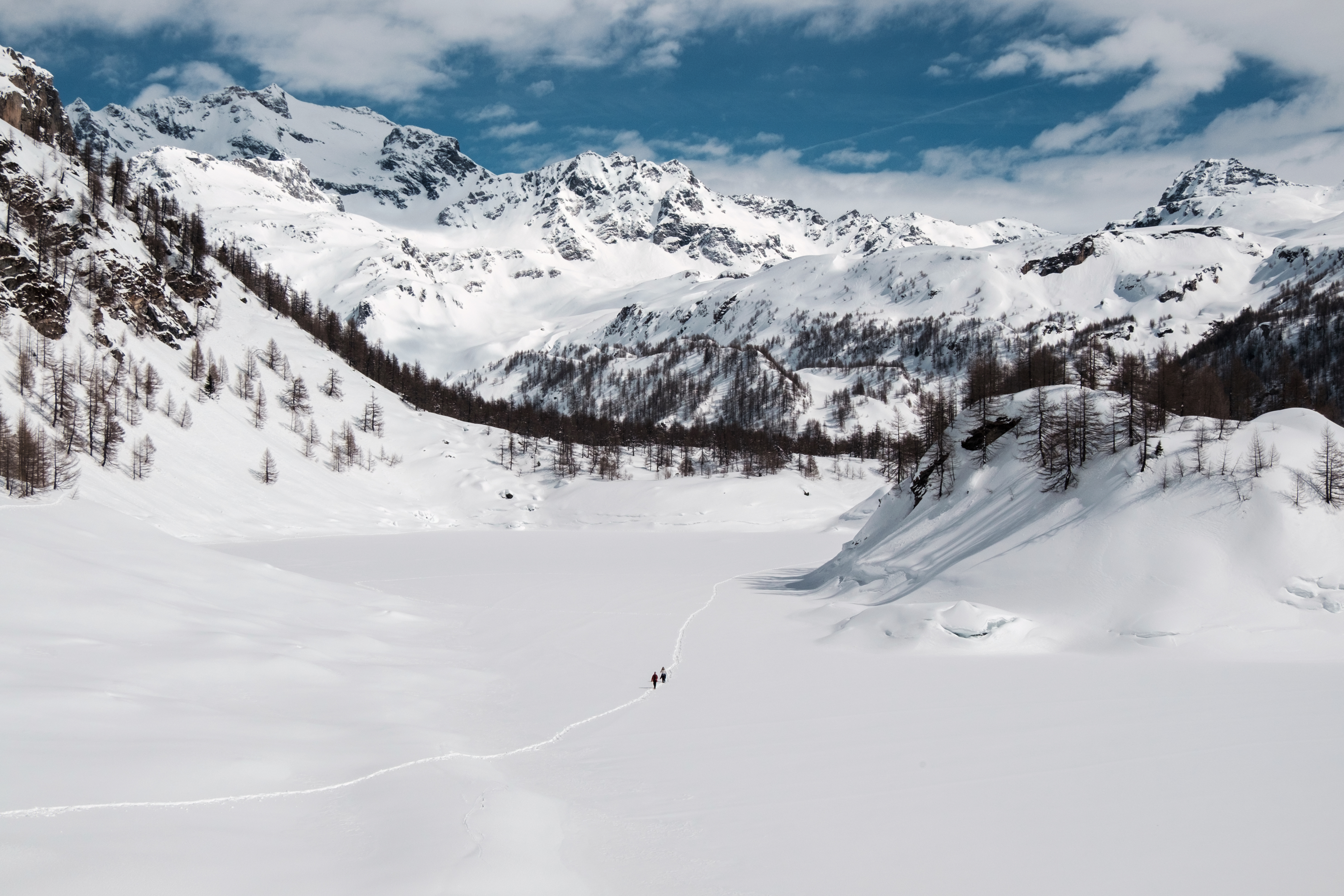
The snow-covered lake

== Bibliography ==
- Mosello, Rosario (1994). Ricerche idrochimiche sui laghi delle valli Ossola e Sesia [Hydrochemical Research on the Lakes of the Ossola and Sesia Valleys] (in Italian). Verbania: Istituto Italiano di Idrobiologia.
- Barbero, Luigi (2006). Codelago, o lago del Devero [Codelago, or Lake Devero] (in Italian). Vol. suppl 62. pp. 62–63.
