= Premia =

- Comune
- Comune di Premia
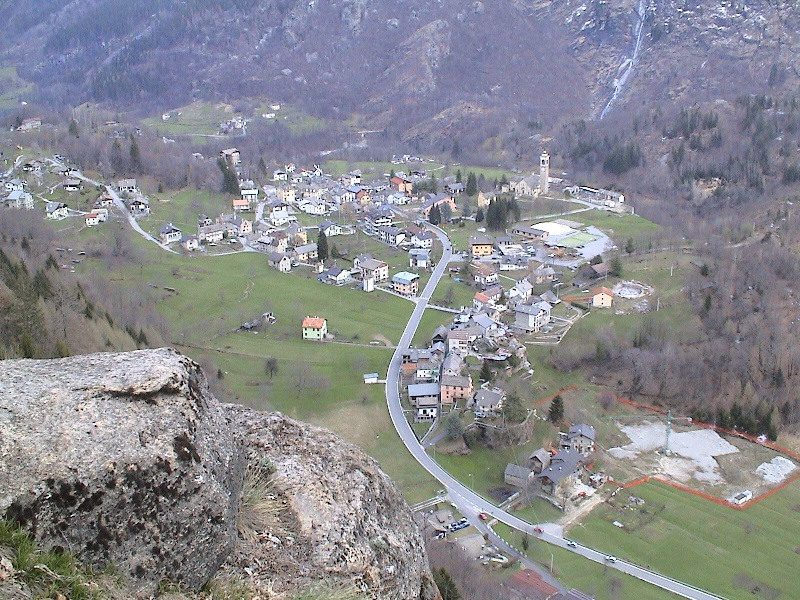
- Premia

- Location within Italy Location within Piedmont
- Coordinates: 46°16′N 8°20′E
- Country: Italy
- Region: Piedmont
- Province: Province of Verbano-Cusio-Ossola (VB)
- Frazioni: Uriezzo, Cresta, Pioda, Rozzaro, Piazza, Altoggio, Albogno, Sagiago, Piedilago, Crego, Cristo, Cadarese, San Rocco, Passo, Salecchio Inferiore, Salecchio Superiore, Case Francoli, Rivasco, Case Cini, Chioso.

Area
  - Total: 88.7 km^{2} (34.2 sq mi)
- Elevation: 800 m (2,600 ft)

Population (Dec. 2005)
  - Total: 614
  - Density: 6.92/km^{2} (17.9/sq mi)
- Time zone: UTC+1 (CET)
  - Summer (DST): UTC+2 (CEST)
- Postal code: 28866
- Dialing code: 0324
- Patron saint: S. Michele
- Saint day: 29 September
- Website: Official website

Premia (Walser German: Saley) is a comune (municipality) in the Province of Verbano-Cusio-Ossola in the Italian region Piedmont, located about 140 kilometres (87 mi) northeast of Turin and about 40 kilometres (25 mi) northwest of Verbania, on the border with Switzerland. As of 31 December 2004, it had a population of 607 and an area of 88.7 square kilometres (34.2 mi^{2}).

Premia borders the following municipalities: Baceno, Bosco/Gurin (Switzerland), Campo (Vallemaggia) (Switzerland), Crodo, Formazza, Montecrestese.

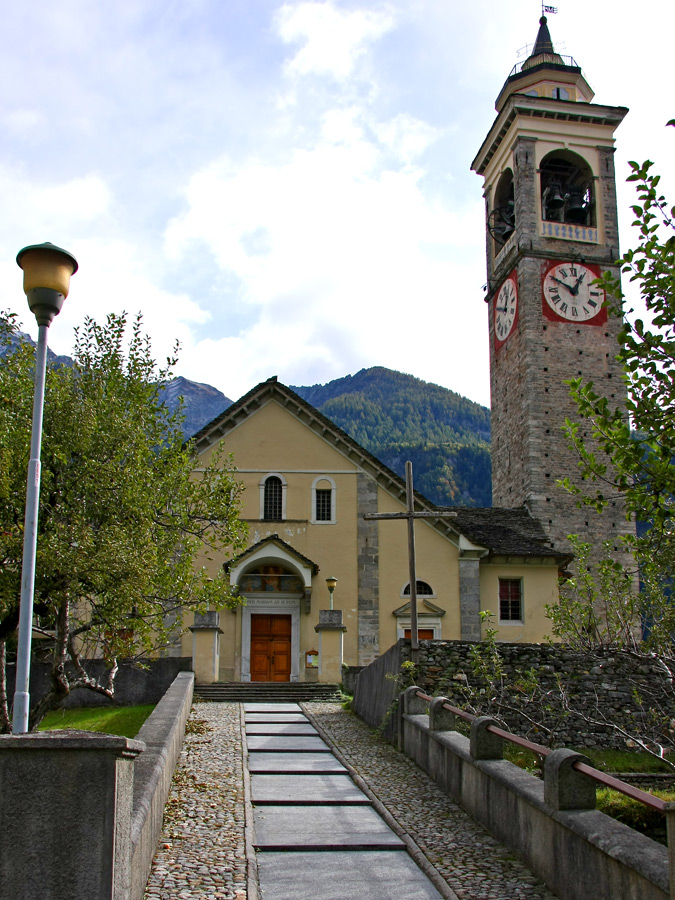
Parish Church

Premia is a thermal spa town.

== Demographic evolution ==
Historical population

Year	Pop.	±%
1861	1,403	—
1871	1,526	+8.8%
1881	1,516	−0.7%
1901	1,129	−25.5%
1911	1,166	+3.3%

Year	Pop.	±%
1921	1,399	+20.0%
1931	1,289	−7.9%
1936	1,246	−3.3%
1951	1,128	−9.5%
1961	1,028	−8.9%

Year	Pop.	±%
1971	867	−15.7%
1981	724	−16.5%
1991	660	−8.8%
2001	603	−8.6%

Source: Data from ISTAT
