= Crodo =

- Comune
- Comune di Crodo
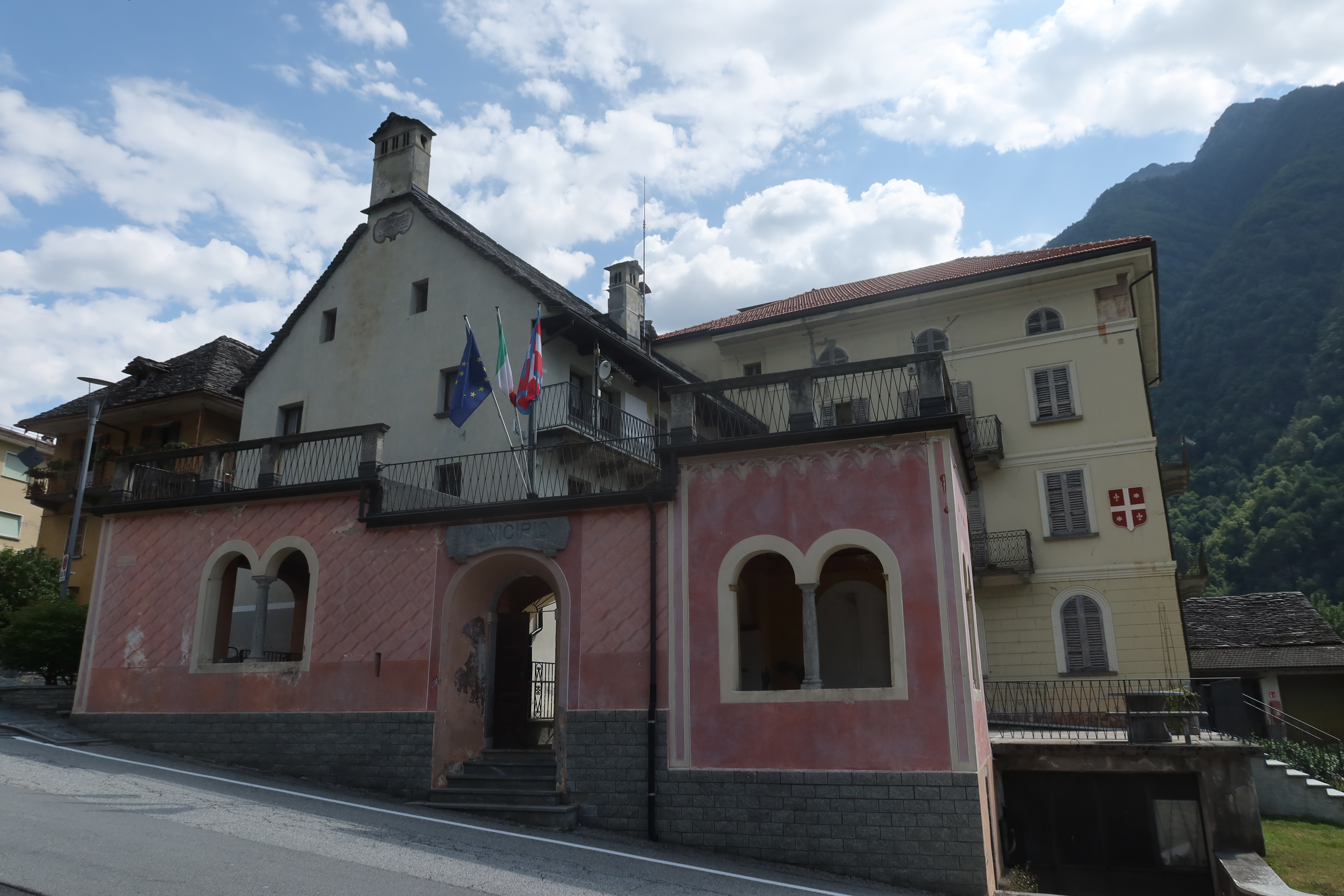

- Location within Italy Location within Piedmont
- Coordinates: 46°13′N 8°19′E
- Country: Italy
- Region: Piedmont
- Province: Province of Verbano-Cusio-Ossola (VB)
- Frazioni: Alpiano, Rencio, Molinetto, Salecchio (o Bagni), Cravegna, Vegno, Emo, Mozzio, Viceno, Mondei, Rovallo, Cuga, Foppiano, Quategno, Braccio, Maglioggio, Prepiana, Garina

Government
  - Mayor: Ermanno Savoia

Area
  - Total: 61.8 km^{2} (23.9 sq mi)
- Elevation: 508 m (1,667 ft)

Population (Dec. 2004)
  - Total: 1,487
  - Density: 24.1/km^{2} (62.3/sq mi)
- Demonym: Crodesi
- Time zone: UTC+1 (CET)
  - Summer (DST): UTC+2 (CEST)
- Postal code: 28862
- Dialing code: 0324
- Website: Official website

Crodo is a comune (municipality) in the Province of Verbano-Cusio-Ossola in the Italian region Piedmont, located about 140 kilometres (87 mi) northeast of Turin and about 35 kilometres (22 mi) northwest of Verbania. As of 31 December 2004, it had a population of 1,487 and an area of 61.8 square kilometres (23.9 mi^{2}).

The municipality of Crodo contains the frazioni (subdivisions, mainly villages and hamlets) Alpiano, Rencio, Molinetto, Salecchio (o Bagni), Cravegna, Vegno, Emo, Mozzio, Viceno, Mondei, Rovallo, Cuga, Foppiano, Quategno, Braccio, Maglioggio, Prepiana, Garina.

Crodo borders the following municipalities: Baceno, Crevoladossola, Montecrestese, Premia, Varzo.

== Geography ==
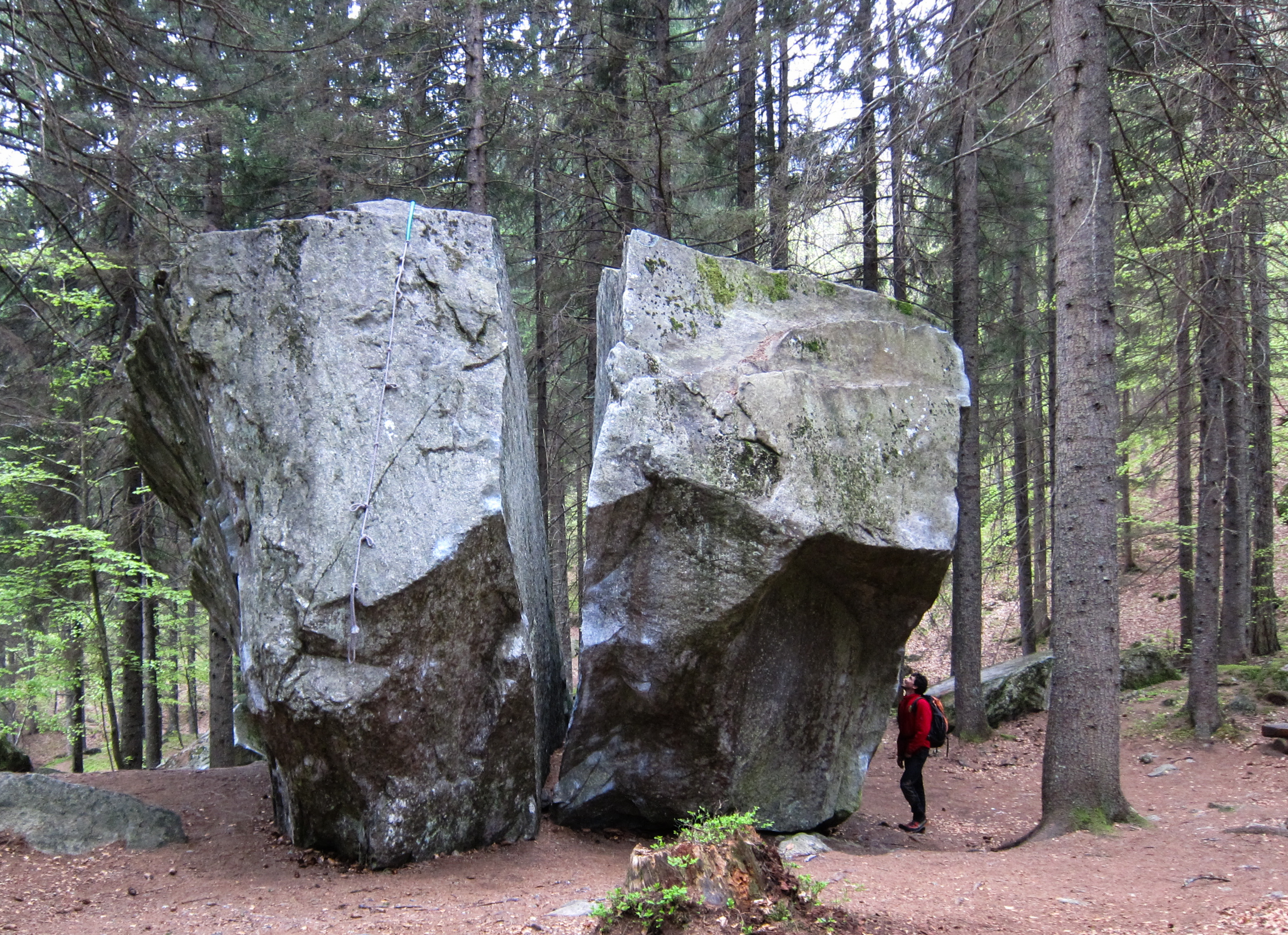
A view of the famous Sass Fendù

In the Foppiano district of Crodo there is a woodland that is famous for the many boulders that are found among the trees. In fact, the area is a notorious climbing spot among bouldering climbers, and the boulder "Sass Fendù" has become a symbol of this place. The valley has been known for climbing since the late 1990s, mostly because of the many gatherings and competitions that have been held there.

== Demographic evolution ==
Historical population

Year	Pop.	±%
1861	1,762	—
1871	1,841	+4.5%
1881	1,840	−0.1%
1901	1,621	−11.9%
1911	1,482	−8.6%

Year	Pop.	±%
1921	1,628	+9.9%
1931	1,647	+1.2%
1936	1,641	−0.4%
1951	1,611	−1.8%
1961	1,633	+1.4%

Year	Pop.	±%
1971	1,653	+1.2%
1981	1,736	+5.0%
1991	1,614	−7.0%
2001	1,483	−8.1%

Source: Data from ISTAT
