= Montecrestese =

- Comune
- Comune di Montecrestese
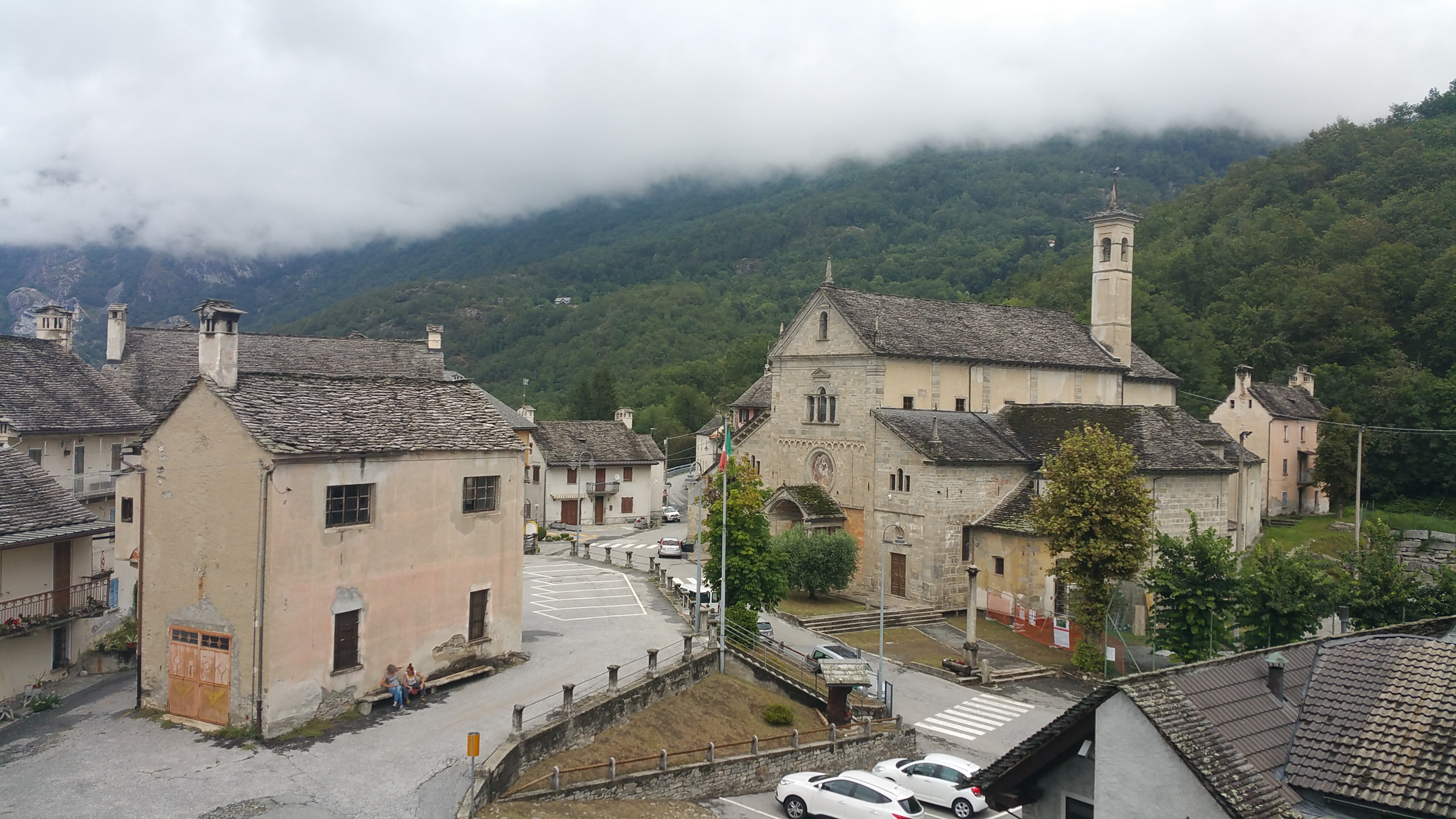

- Location within Italy Location within Piedmont
- Coordinates: 46°13′N 8°19′E
- Country: Italy
- Region: Piedmont
- Province: Province of Verbano-Cusio-Ossola (VB)

Government
  - Mayor: Angelo Tanferani

Area
  - Total: 86.4 km^{2} (33.4 sq mi)

Population (Dec. 2004)
  - Total: 1,197
  - Density: 13.9/km^{2} (35.9/sq mi)
- Time zone: UTC+1 (CET)
  - Summer (DST): UTC+2 (CEST)
- Postal code: 28030
- Dialing code: 0324

Montecrestese is a comune (municipality) in the Province of Verbano-Cusio-Ossola in the Italian region Piedmont, located about 140 kilometres (87 mi) northeast of Turin and about 35 kilometres (22 mi) northwest of Verbania, on the border with Switzerland. As of 31 December 2004, it had a population of 1,197 and an area of 86.4 square kilometres (33.4 mi^{2}).

Montecrestese borders the following municipalities: Campo (Vallemaggia) (Switzerland), Crevoladossola, Crodo, Masera, Premia, Santa Maria Maggiore.

== Demographic evolution ==
Historical population

| Year | Pop. | ±% |
|---|---|---|
| 1861 | 1,357 | — |
| 1871 | 1,444 | +6.4% |
| 1881 | 1,427 | −1.2% |
| 1901 | 1,126 | −21.1% |
| 1911 | 1,103 | −2.0% |

| Year | Pop. | ±% |
|---|---|---|
| 1921 | 1,187 | +7.6% |
| 1931 | 1,155 | −2.7% |
| 1936 | 1,274 | +10.3% |
| 1951 | 1,289 | +1.2% |
| 1961 | 1,320 | +2.4% |

| Year | Pop. | ±% |
|---|---|---|
| 1971 | 1,256 | −4.8% |
| 1981 | 1,247 | −0.7% |
| 1991 | 1,233 | −1.1% |
| 2001 | 1,209 | −1.9% |

Source: Data from ISTAT
