= Baceno =

- Comune
- Comune di Baceno
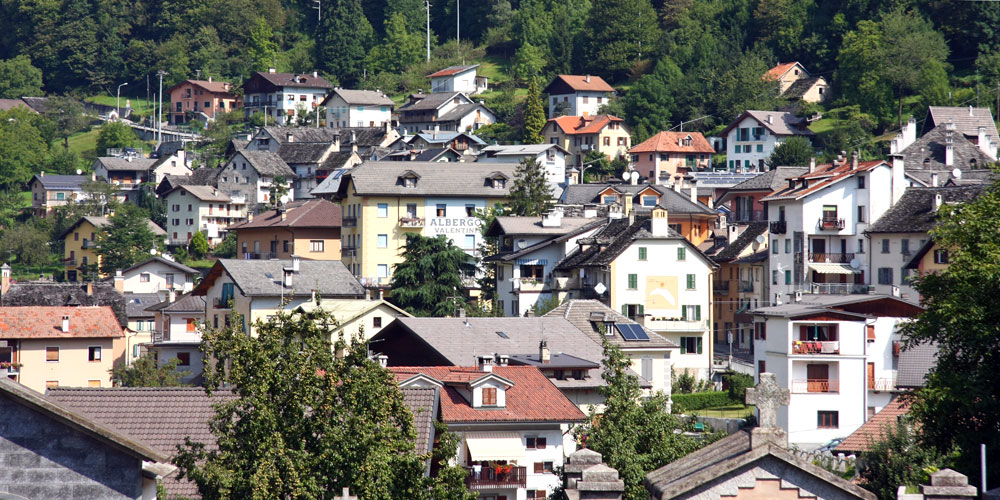

- Location within Italy Location within Piedmont
- Coordinates: 46°16′N 8°19′E
- Country: Italy
- Region: Piedmont
- Province: Province of Verbano-Cusio-Ossola (VB)
- Frazioni: Alpe Devero, Croveo, Goglio, Rifugio Castiglioni E. all'Alpe Devero, Rifugio Sesto Calende all'Alpe Devero

Government
  - Mayor: Andrea Vicini

Area
  - Total: 77.27 km^{2} (29.83 sq mi)
- Elevation: 655 m (2,149 ft)

Population (30 April 2017)
  - Total: 916
  - Density: 11.9/km^{2} (30.7/sq mi)
- Demonym: Bacenesi
- Time zone: UTC+1 (CET)
  - Summer (DST): UTC+2 (CEST)
- Postal code: 28050
- Dialing code: 0323
- Website: Official website

Baceno (Lombard Bascén, Walser German: Aager) is a comune (municipality) in the Province of Verbano-Cusio-Ossola in the Italian region Piedmont, located about 140 kilometres (87 mi) northeast of Turin and about 40 kilometres (25 mi) northwest of Verbania, on the border with Switzerland.

Baceno is divided into frazioni: Crampiolo, Crino, Croveo, Devero, Goglio, Graglia, Osso, Uresso.

Baceno borders the following municipalities: Binn (Switzerland), Crodo, Formazza, Grengiols (Switzerland), Premia, Varzo.
