= Siedel Rothorn =

Mountain of the Lepontine Alps

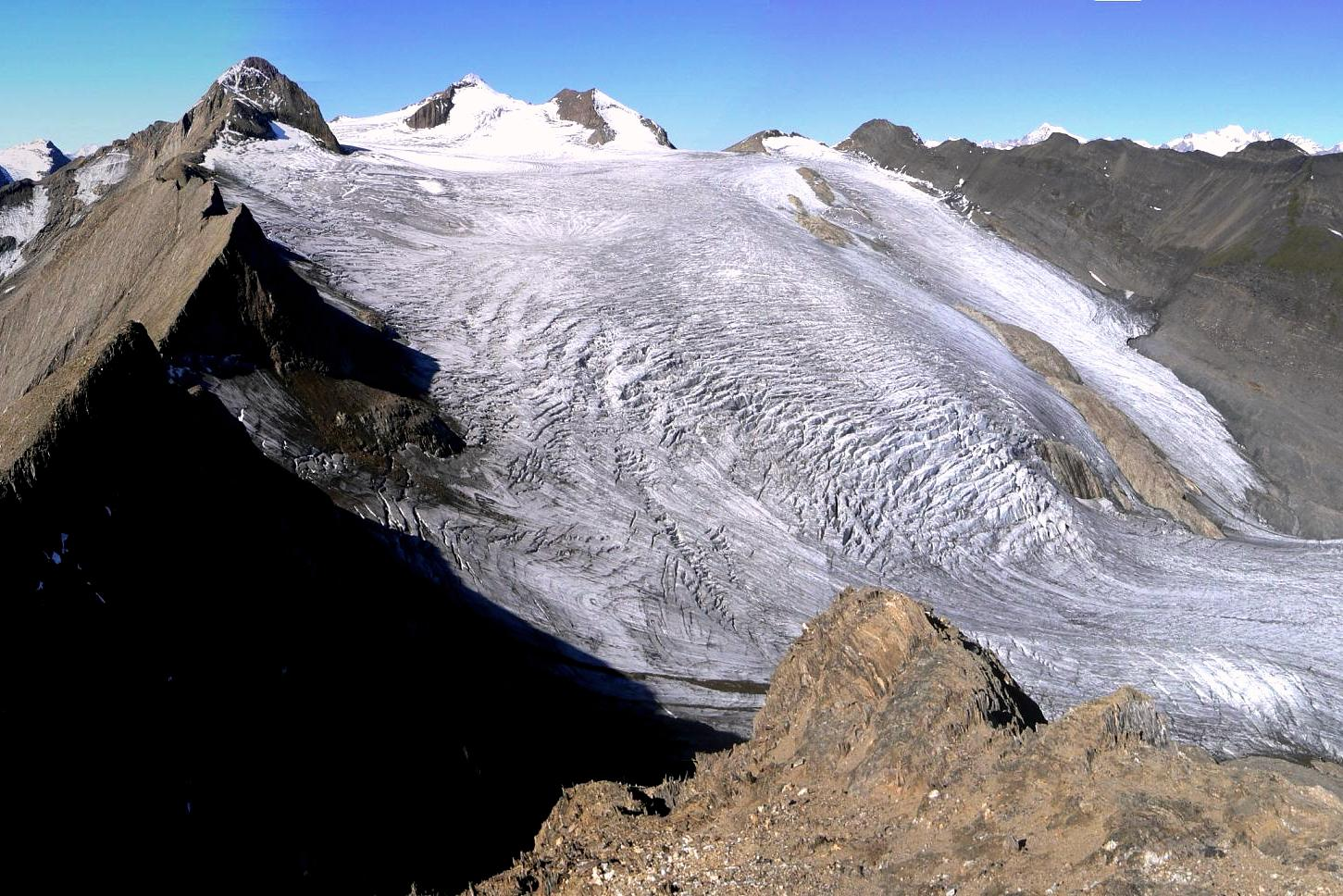
- Siedel Rothorn seen from Punta dei Camosci. Blinnenhorn is on the right

Highest point
- Elevation: 3,289 m (10,791 ft)

Geography
- Location: Piedmont, Italy; Valais, Switzerland
- Parent range: Lepontine Alps

The Siedel Rothorn, also known as Rothorn or Corno Rosso, is a mountain of the Lepontine Alps, with an elevation of 3,289 metres (10,791 ft).

== Details ==
It is located on the Swiss-Italian border, between the Piedmontese Province of Verbano-Cusio-Ossola in Italy and Canton Valais in Switzerland.

Its Italian side is rocky and steep, containing the small Siedel glacier, whereas the Swiss side is party covered by the Gries glacier. The Siedel Rothorn lies between the Blinnenhorn (to the north) and the Bättelmatthorn (to the south), to which it is linked by ridges.

Although less famous than Ofenhorn or Basòdino, the Siedel Rothorn is taller, the second tallest peak of Val Formazza after the nearby Blinnenhorn. The peak can be climbed from Rifugio 3A or Rifugio Città di Busto.
