= LeClaire Historic District =

Historic district in Illinois, United States

- U.S. National Register of Historic Places
- U.S. Historic district
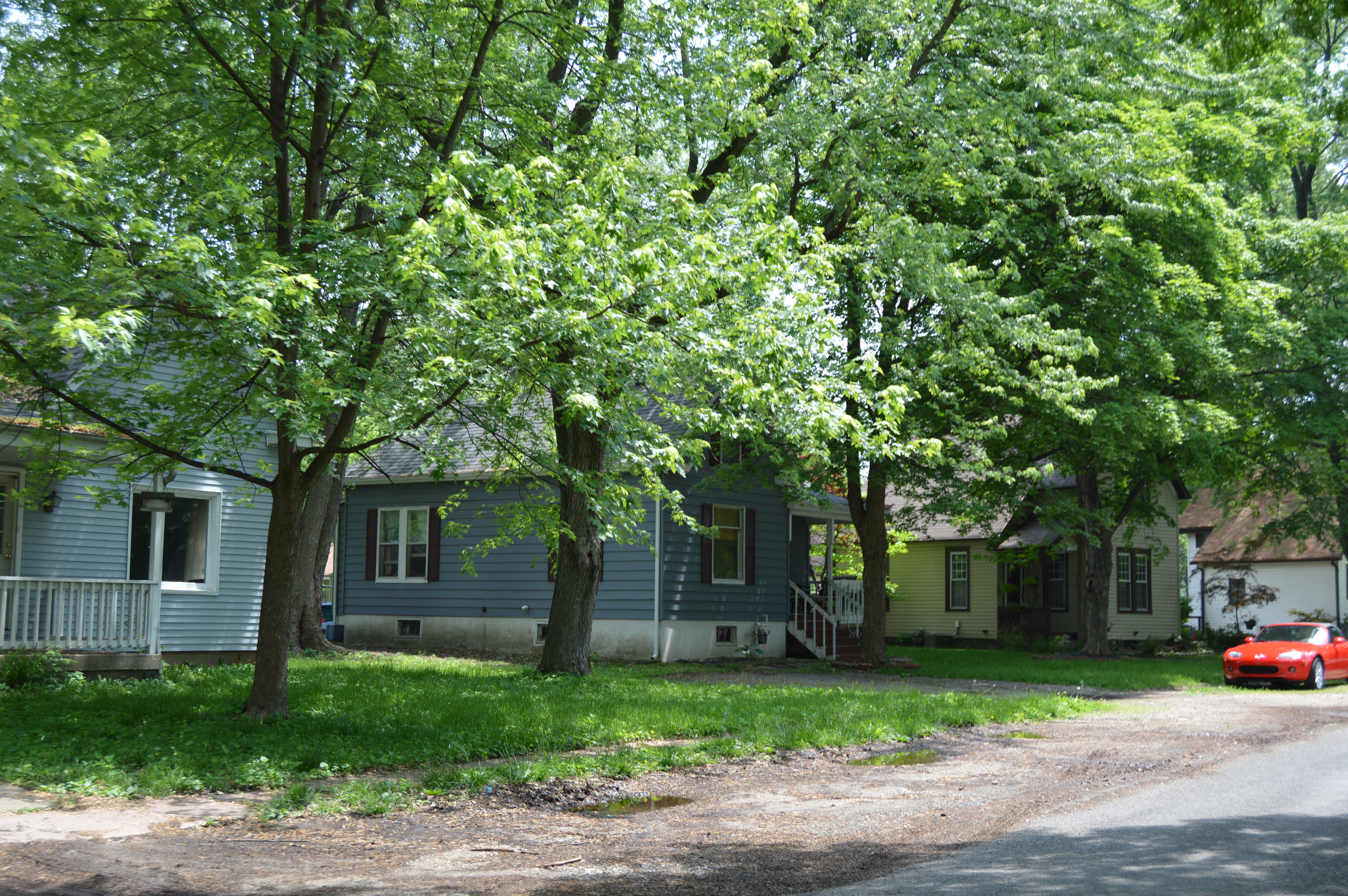
- Holyoake Road

- Location within Illinois Location within the United States
- Location: Roughly bounded by RR tracks, Wolf St., Hadley and Madison, Edwardsville, Illinois
- Coordinates: 38°48′01″N 89°57′00″W
- Area: 200 acres (81 ha)
- Built: 1890-95
- NRHP reference No.: 79000855
- Added to NRHP: August 8, 1979

LeClaire Historic District is a historic district located in Edwardsville, Illinois. The community was added to the National Register of Historic Places on August 8, 1979.

N. O. Nelson, the owner of the Nelson Manufacturing Company, established the town between 1890 and 1895 on donated land. A factory complex was built for his company to provide jobs for the residents of Leclaire. Each building had working electricity, a sprinkler system, and featured large arched windows to provide natural light for the workers. Nelson planned the town to be an intentional community inspired by ideals such as Edward Bellamy's novel Looking Backward and the Ethical Culture movement. The community included an academy which offered free adult education and reading rooms, which was inspired by a self-culture hall in St. Louis.

Nelson also established a profit sharing system in the community. The system was derived from a concept used at the Maison LeClaire in Paris, from which the community took its name.

As LeClaire was an open community, its residents were not all company employees, nor were employees required to live in the community. However, the company provided utilities and public facilities to LeClaire residents. Journalist Nellie Bly compared the community favorably to Pullman in Chicago, and Ida Tarbell also wrote about the community.

The historic LeClaire water tower, also known as 'Tin Man,' was constructed in 1931. By 1993, it was no longer providing water service.

In 1933, LeClaire was annexed within the Edwardsville city limits.

== Factory Complex ==
The factories were built some time between 1890 and 1895. Designed by St. Louis architect E. A. Cameron. The state of the art building was fully electrified, had large windows for natural lighting, and a working sprinkler system in case of fires. The complex's buildings housed specialized workshops, including a machine shop, marble shop, brass shop, cabinet shop, and varnish shop.

== Related reading ==
- Rygg, Andreas Nilsen. "A Norwegian Settlement in Missouri". The Norwegian-American Historical Association.
- Stephens, G. W. (1928–1990). "Nelson, Nelson, Olsen". Dictionary of American Biography. Vol. 13. New York: Charles Scribner's Sons. pp. 419–420.
- Taylor, Sedley; Briggs, Archibald; Briggs, Henry Currer (1884). Profit-sharing between capital and labour six essays ... to which is added a memorandum on The industrial partnership at the Whitwood Collieries (1865-1874). K. Paul, Trench & Co. ISBN 9781177996792. OCLC 682190565.
