= Val Formazza =

Alpine valley in Piedmont, Italy

Coordinates: 46°19′22″N 8°23′13″E

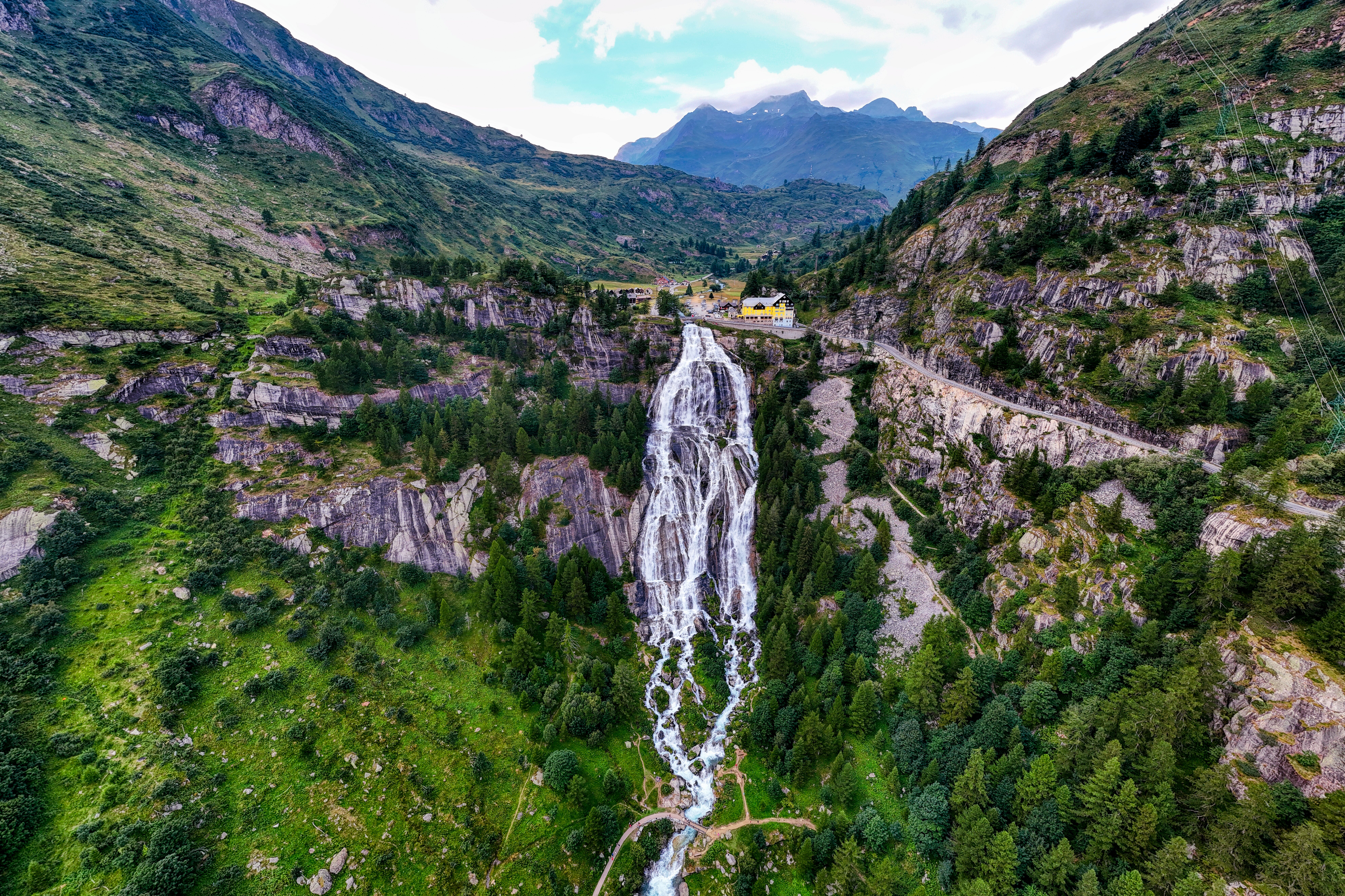
Toce waterfall

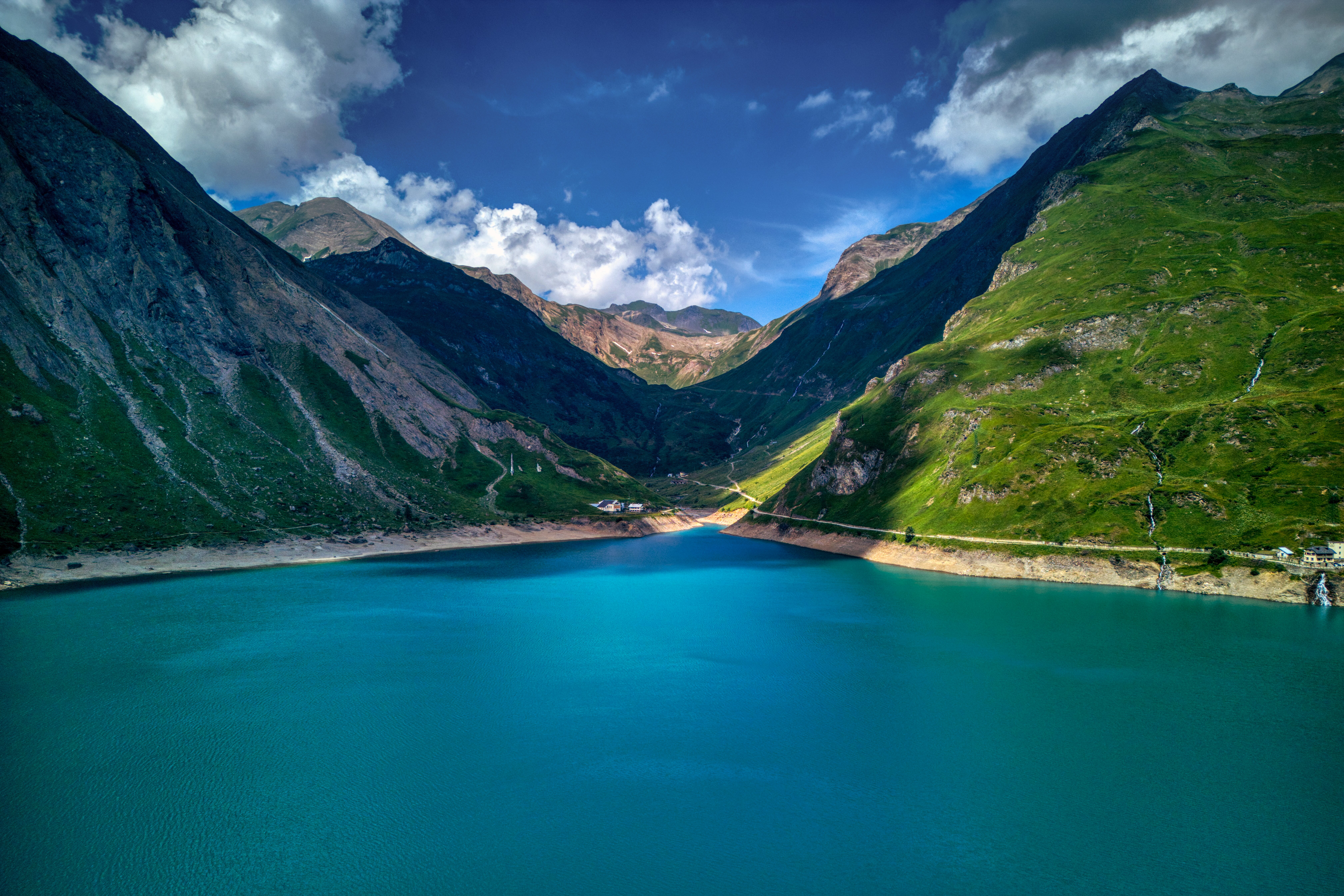
Morasco Lake

The Val Formazza (Walser: Pomattertal; Ossolano: Val Formassa) is a valley in the Lepontine Alps, in the Piedmontese province of Verbano-Cusio-Ossola, Italy. Bordering Switzerland, it represents the northernmost part of Val d'Ossola and Piedmont.

The river Toce flows through the valley, forming the Toce waterfall. Seven hydroelectric reservoirs were built in the valley in the 20th century: lakes Morasco, Sabbione, Toggia, Vannino, Castel, Busin, and Sruer.

The valley is surrounded by several three-thousanders, the highest of which is the Blinnenhorn, followed by the Siedel Rothorn, Basòdino, Ofenhorn, Punta del Sabbione, Kastelhorn, Punta dei Camosci, Corno di Ban and Monte Giove. Ten mountain huts are located on its mountains.

Two municipalities are located in the valley, Premia and Formazza, the latter of which is home to a Walser community.

Much of the valley (22,233 hectares) is covered by a Special Protection Area as part of the Natura 2000 network.
