= N. O. Nelson =

American industrialist and businessman (1844–1922)

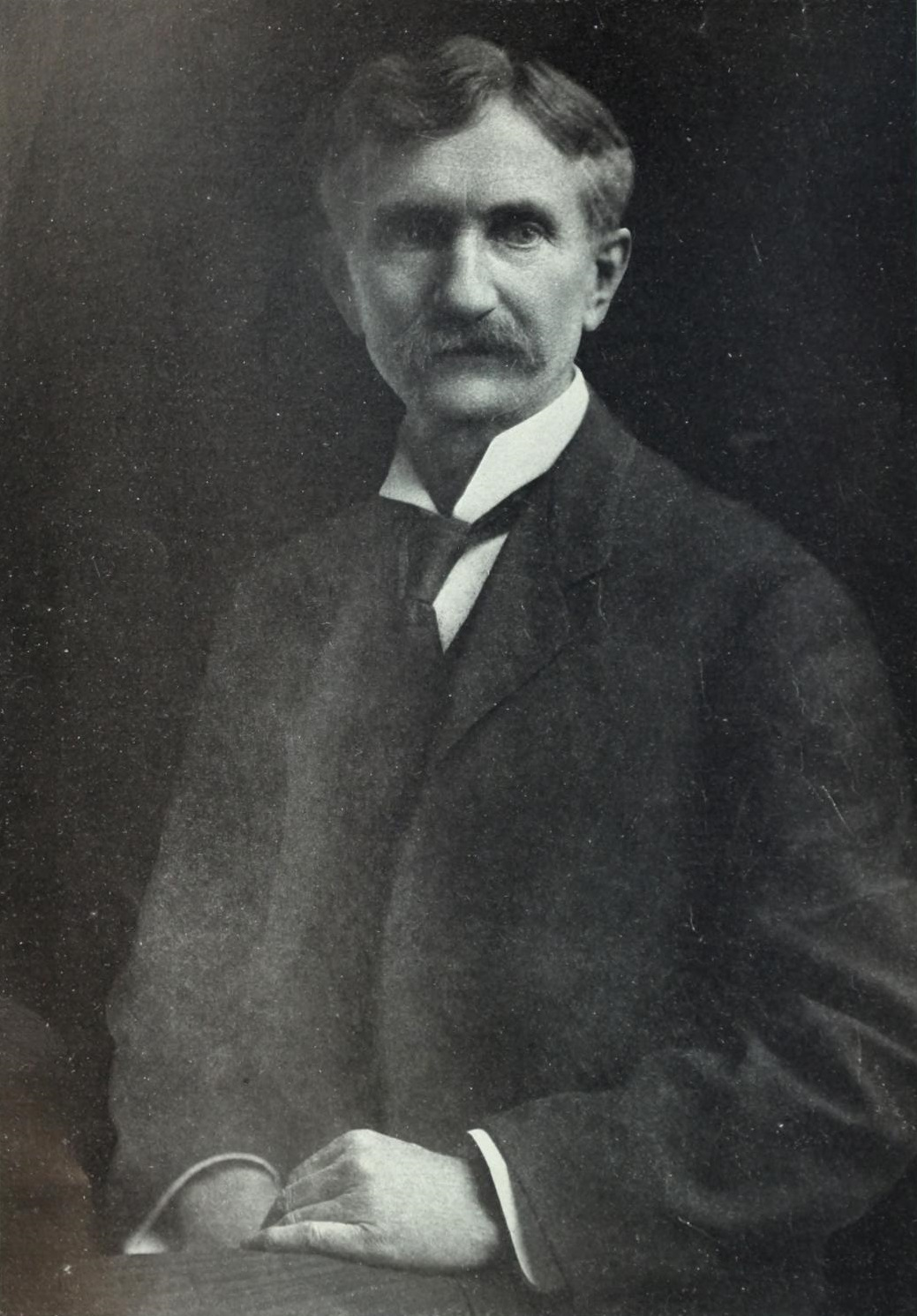
N. O. Nelson

Nils Olas Nelson (September 11, 1844 – October 5, 1922) was an American industrialist and businessman who was the founder of the N. O. Nelson Manufacturing Company.

== Background ==
Nelson was born the son of Anders Nelson at Lillesand in Nedenes, Norway. His family immigrated to the United States in 1847. He grew up on his parents' farm near St. Joseph, Missouri. After serving in the American Civil War, he was introduced into a career in accounting. He became a bookkeeper for a plumbing fixtures firm in St. Louis, Missouri.

== N. O. Nelson Manufacturing Co. ==
In 1877, he started the N. O. Nelson Manufacturing Company in St. Louis, Missouri. Once he had established his business, he moved from simply wholesaling items to manufacturing items dealing with the area of plumbing. The company manufactured and distributed plumbing supplies of all kinds, including faucets, water closets, water heaters, valves, and fire hydrants. In 1888, Nelson decided to relocate the manufacturing facility from St. Louis to a rural area. In 1890 a suitable location was found across the Mississippi River in Madison County, Illinois. The complex was designed by St. Louis architect Edward A. Cameron (1861–1899) specifically for the Nelson Manufacturing Company.

== Leclaire, Illinois ==
In 1890, N. O. Nelson founded the village of Leclaire as a model company town. The development of Leclaire started with the original plat design by engineer, surveyor and city planner Julius Pitzman (1837–1923). Nelson named the community after French economist and businessman Edme-Jean Leclaire, who had inaugurated employee profit sharing in France. Leclaire was a model cooperative offering affordable homes, free education, opportunities for recreation, and employment at the N. O. Nelson Manufacturing Company. Nelson implemented profit sharing and employee benefits. For a short time, Nelson lived in a Federal-Style home within the heart of Leclaire, residing amongst and socializing with his own factory workers. In 1902, he founded a cooperative store in Leclaire.

Nelson's vision was influenced by the progressive theory of his era, including that of Sedley Taylor, professor at Trinity College, Cambridge and his 1885 essays On Profit Sharing Between Capital and Labor. In 1895, Nelson had been a delegate to the meeting in London, England of the Co-operation and Profit Sharing Associations of the World. Nelson was also responsible for the organization within the Greater St. Louis area of many recreational and cultural activities for the underprivileged.

In 1934, the city of Edwardsville, Illinois annexed the village. Today the LeClaire Historic District is composed mostly of original structures and has been placed on the National Register of Historic Places since 1979. The renovated N. O. Nelson factory buildings are now the historic N. O. Nelson Campus of Lewis and Clark Community College. The complex is host to college classes, the Confluence Fab lab, and the Leclaire Room reception venue.

== Personal life ==
He was married in 1868 to Almeria Posegate (1844–1918). They were the parents of five children, only two of whom survived to adulthood: Julia (1869–1960) and Charlotte (1878–1963). N. O. Nelson died in Los Angeles, California at the age of 78. Both N. O. and Almeria Nelson were buried in the Bellefontaine Cemetery in St. Louis, Missouri.

== Other sources ==
- Rygg, Andreas Nilsen (1943) A Norwegian Settlement in Missouri (Norwegian-American Historical Association. Volume XIII: Page 108)
- Stephens, G. W. (1934) Nelson Olsen Nelson (Dictionary of American Biography, 13:419-420)

== Related reading ==
- Taylor, Sedley (1885) Profit Sharing between Capital and Labour
