= Punta dei Camosci =

Mountain in Italy

Coordinates: 46.442°N 8.351°E

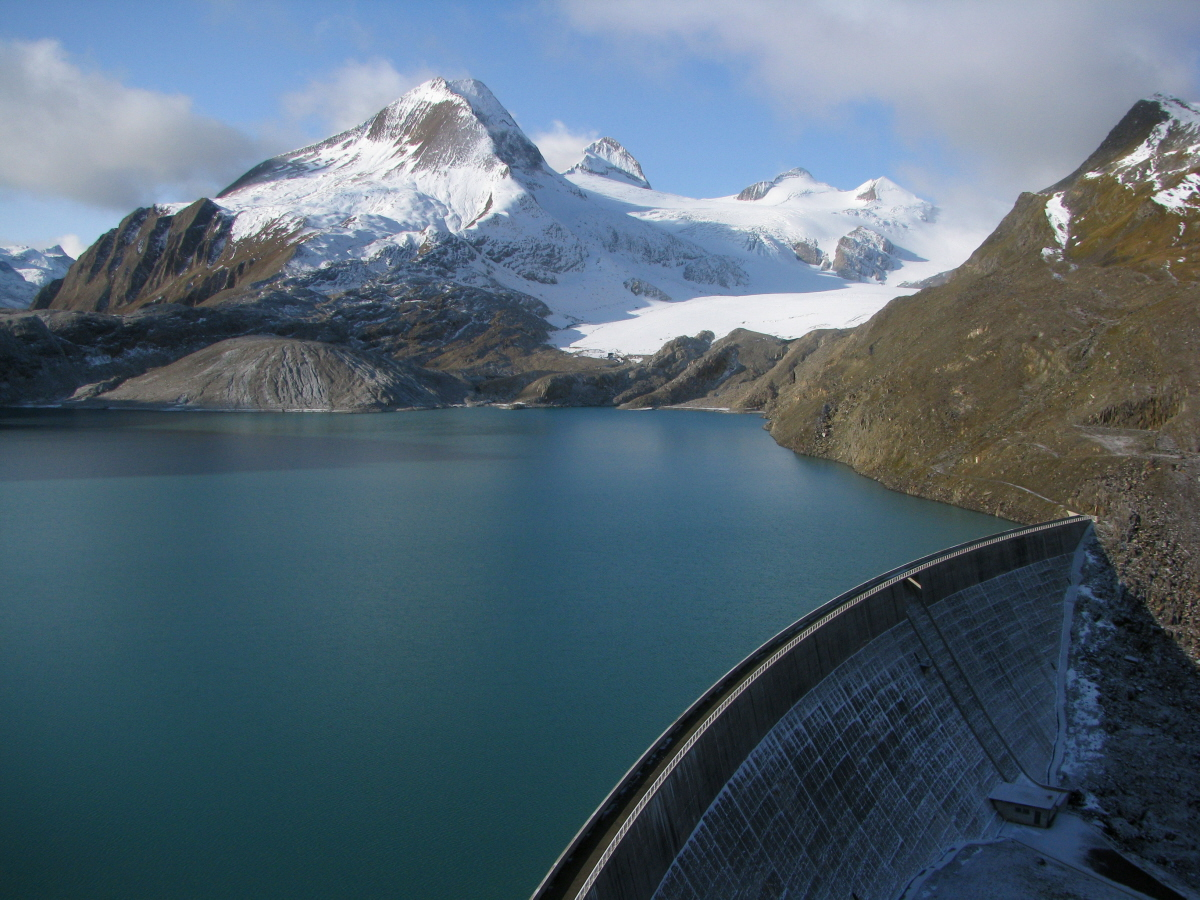
- Punta dei Camosci (left) with Siedel Rothorn (center) and Blinnenhorn (right). Griessee in the foreground

Highest point
- Elevation: 3,046 m (9,993 ft)

Geography
- Location: Piedmont, Italy; Valais, Switzerland
- Parent range: Lepontine Alps

The Punta dei Camosci, or Bättelmatthorn, is a mountain of the Lepontine Alps, with an elevation of 3,046 metres (9,993 ft). It is located on the Italy–Switzerland border, between the Piedmontese Province of Verbano-Cusio-Ossola in Italy and Canton Valais in Switzerland.

Its Italian side is rocky and bare, whereas the Swiss side is party covered by the Gries glacier. The Siedel Rothorn lies to the north, linked to the Bättelmatthorn by a ridge; the Blinnenhorn is farther north.

The peak can be reached from Rifugio 3A or Rifugio Città di Busto in Italy, and from Nufenen Pass in Switzerland.
