= Casa del Fanciullo =

Italian residential institution for children of Italian migrants in Switzerland

- Casa del Fanciullo
- Formation: 1962
- Founder: Capuchins
- Type: Residential care
- Affiliations: Sisters of Saint Joseph

The Casa del Fanciullo ("House of the Child") was a residential institution for children founded by the Capuchins in 1962 in Domodossola, a town in Piedmont, northern Italy, near the border with the Swiss canton of Valais. It was established primarily to house boys—mostly from Italian families working in Switzerland—who became known as "border orphans" (orfani di frontiera). The institution remained active into the early 2000s, subsequently sheltering young women in difficulty with children until 2010, and then housing migrants until 2024.

== Background and founding ==
The Casa del Fanciullo was built in a peripheral district of Domodossola, stigmatized as "Abissinia," a name reflecting the perception of its population: southern Italian immigrant families who had settled there from the 1950s onward. The institution was part of a broader set of social initiatives developed by the Capuchins during the same period, including primary schools, a nursery, a kindergarten, and a recreational center, all supported by donations and by local municipal and ecclesiastical authorities.

At its founding in 1962, the institution accommodated around forty boys aged between four and ten, either permanently, periodically, or on a day basis, who had been separated from their families for various reasons including the death, illness, or absence of parents due to work. Demand for space led to the opening of a second site in 1966, when the recreational space (Casa San Francesco) was converted to house older children.

== "Border orphans" and Swiss migration policy ==
Most residents came from families whose parents worked in Switzerland, either continuously or as cross-border or seasonal workers holding permits valid for nine months per year. Their placement reflected several logics tied to family migration strategies. The proximity to Switzerland facilitated weekend or holiday visits. Because Italian emigration to Switzerland was conceived as a temporary project—by both the migrants and Swiss authorities—the Casa del Fanciullo allowed families to school their children in Italian rather than German or French, in anticipation of an eventual return to Italy.

Placement at Domodossola was also frequently an indirect consequence of the prohibition on family reunification imposed on seasonal workers, which affected approximately 500,000 children of Italian origin between 1949 and 1975 (other nationalities were also affected). The combination of Swiss-side restrictions with the Italian state's failure to protect its emigrants made the border zone a space of precarity in which the Church intervened to fill the gap in social protection. During the same period, another strategy for circumventing the reunification ban was to keep children in Switzerland: around 50,000 of them, known as "cupboard children" (bambini dell'armadio) or "hidden children," lived clandestinely with their parents. Other solutions included placement with relatives or in institutions in the family's region of origin, or with families or in establishments in Switzerland. Parents often combined several strategies, illustrating the complexity of situations produced by the family reunification ban and other restrictive migration policies. These strategies applied to girls as well; female institutions were reserved for them in border regions (notably in Domodossola) and in many other Italian localities such as Como and Milan.

== Daily life and operations ==
Residents attended local schools. Despite limited documentary sources, estimates suggest the institution housed more than 1,000 boys aged 3 to 18 between 1962 and the early 2000s. It was managed by the Capuchins in collaboration with the Sisters of Saint Joseph, whose mother superior was a qualified educator. Daily life was strict and shaped by Catholic education. In general, children maintained regular contact with their families and visits were commonly permitted. Some residents, even young ones, could travel alone by train across the border to visit their parents in Switzerland; during school holidays, some were allowed to join their families. Each summer, a holiday camp was organized at Osso, in the Piedmontese municipality of Baceno (Val Formazza). From 1962, children were housed in disused railway carriages donated by Oscar Luigi Scalfaro, then a future Minister of Transport and later President of Italy.

== Testimonies and demands for recognition ==
Around the 2020s, several former residents expressed feelings of having been victims of injustice and anger toward Swiss migration policies and the failure of Italian authorities to provide protection. Their testimonies, gathered by the press, media, and academic researchers, also revealed that they had been subjected to severe punishments and psychological, physical, and sexual violence during their time at the institution.

While many parents eventually returned to live in Italy, several former residents chose to settle in Switzerland as adults. An association called Tesoro, bringing together Italians affected by the restrictions of Swiss migration policy—including "hidden children" and others—was founded in 2021. The association demands official apologies from the Swiss Confederation, a process of historical memory work concerning the criminalization of families subject to seasonal and annual resident statutes, and financial compensation for the suffering endured.

== Bibliography ==
- Frigerio Martina, Marina; Burgherr, Simone: Versteckte Kinder. Zwischen Illegalität und Trennung. Saisonnierkinder und ihre Eltern erzählen, 1992.
- Ricciardi, Toni: "I figli degli stagionali: bambini clandestini", in: Studi Emigrazione, 47 (180), 2010, pp. 872–886.
- Shaukat, Saffia Elisa: "Les 'orphelins de frontière' à la Casa del fanciullo de Domodossola: des familles migrantes désagrégées", in: Furrer, Markus; Heiniger, Kevin et al. (eds.): Entre assistance et contrainte: le placement des enfants et des jeunes en Suisse 1850–1980, 2014, pp. 113–122.
- Ricciardi, Toni: Breve storia dell'emigrazione italiana in Svizzera. Dall'esodo di massa alle nuove mobilità, 2018.
- Ricciardi, Toni: "L'enfance niée en Suisse: perspectives historiques", in: Blais, Nathalie; Fois, Marisa; Roblain, Antoine (eds.): Dynamiques de formalisation et d'informalisation dans l'étude des migrations, 2019, pp. 193–207.
- Les saisonniers.ères en Suisse. Travail, migration, xénophobie et solidarité, 2022 (Traverse, 29/3).
- Nardone, Marco: "Le misure coercitive a scopo assistenziale e i collocamenti extrafamiliari nei confronti delle famiglie italiane (1945–81)", in: Mignano, Silvio; Ricciardi, Toni (eds.): Più svizzeri, sempre italiani. Mezzo secolo dopo l'«iniziativa Schwarzenbach», 2022, pp. 79–96.
- Ricciardi, Toni: "Infanzia e genitorialità negata nella Svizzera del miracolo economico", in: Mignano, Silvio; Ricciardi, Toni (eds.): Più svizzeri, sempre italiani. Mezzo secolo dopo l'«iniziativa Schwarzenbach», 2022, pp. 61–78.
- Hörler, Daniela: "'Migrantin, Arbeiterin und Mutter'. Die Säuglingsheime der Stadt Zürich und die ambivalente Konfiguration rund um die Herkunftsfamilien von 1970–1979", in: Revue suisse de travail social, 32, 2024.
- Ricciardi, Toni; Nardone, Marco; Cattacin, Sandro: "Familles italiennes en Suisse. Entre placements extrafamiliaux et enfances niées", in: Knüsel, René; Grob, Alexander; Mottier, Véronique (eds.): Placements et destinée. Décisions des autorités et conséquences sur les parcours de vie, 2024, pp. 161–172.
