= Monte Giove =

Mountain in Italy

Coordinates: 46°21′41″N 8°23′17″E

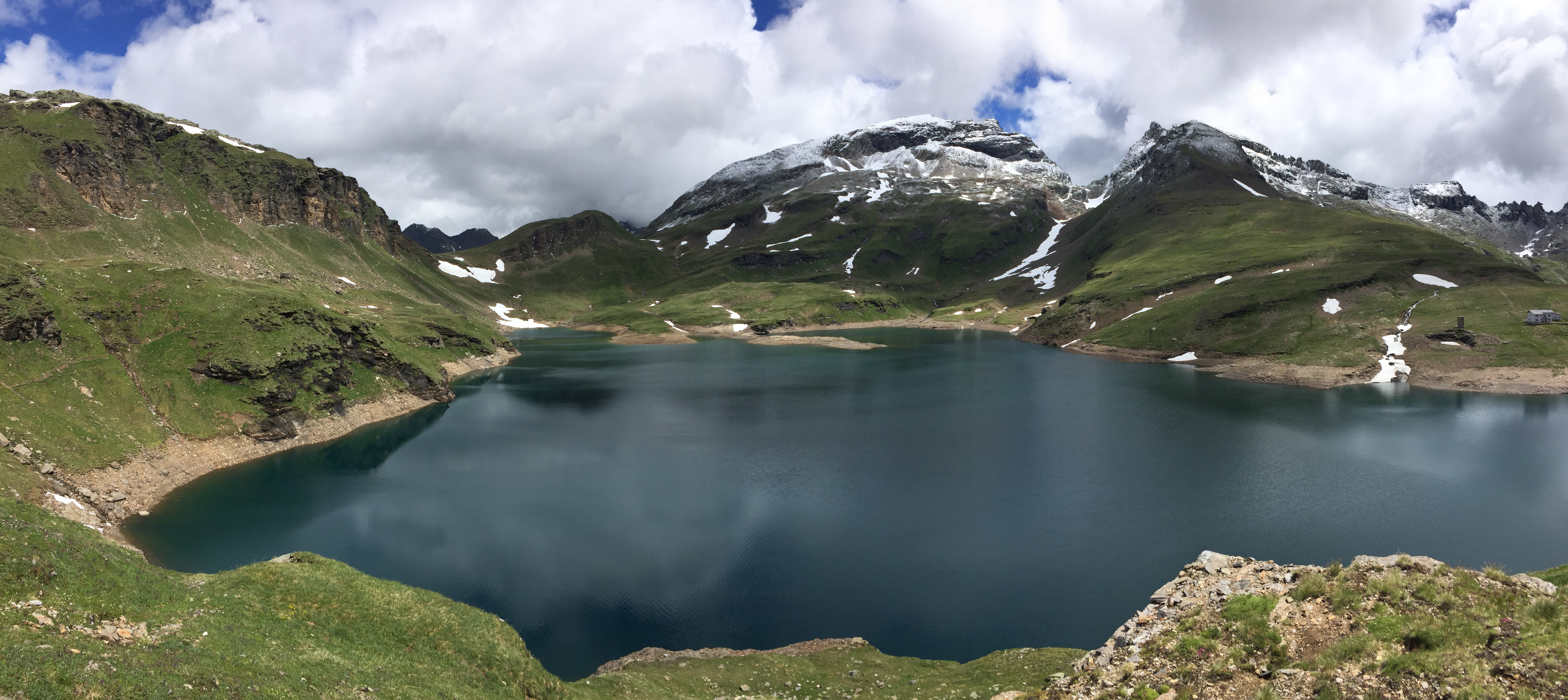
- Lake Busin with Monte Giove in the background

Highest point
- Elevation: 3,009 m (9,872 ft)
- Prominence: 516 m (1,693 ft)
- Isolation: 6.01 km (3.73 mi)

Geography
- Location: Piedmont, Italy
- Parent range: Lepontine Alps

Monte Giove is a mountain of Piedmont, Italy, with an elevation of 3,009 metres (9,872 ft). It is located in the Lepontine Alps, in the Province of Verbano-Cusio-Ossola.

An excellent viewpoint over most of the Val Formazza owing to its isolated position, it can be reached via a hiking path starting from the village of Ponte (Formazza).
