= Sedley Taylor Road =

Road in Cambridge, England

Coordinates: 52.1817°N 0.1338°E

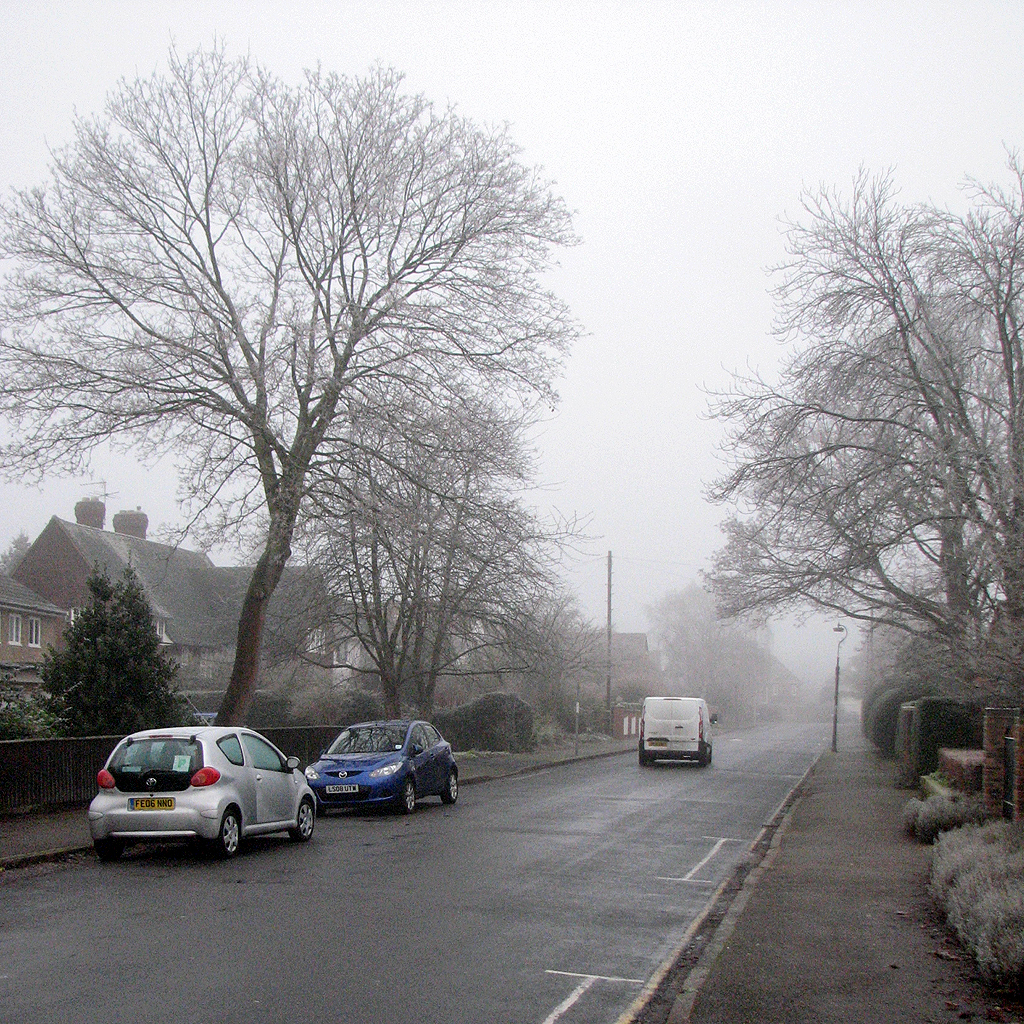
Sedley Taylor Road

Sedley Taylor Road is a road in west Cambridge, England. It is reputedly one of the most expensive in the UK and the most expensive in East Anglia. The road was built on land owned by Trinity College and named after one of its professors, Sedley Taylor (1834–1920).

No 31 was the home of Nobel Prize-winning physicists Sir Nevill Mott and Sir John Cockcroft. No 12 (Tretherbyn) was home to explorer and archaeologist Tom Lethbridge. Alcantara, a house near the South end of the street, is grade II listed.

No 22 was built by architect S E Urwin for his own use.

The street numbering is consecutive, starting at 1 on the West side at the North end counting to 23 at the South end. 24 to 44 are on the East side of the road, but until 2009 there was no number 30. The postcode on the planning consent for No 30 also illustrates that postcodes in the road were changed in 2007, from CB2 2xx to CB2 8xx, and older documents referring to the street may therefore not use a correct postcode. The East side houses formerly had direct access to the Perse School playing fields but that ended when a rabbit fence was erected in the playing fields in 2011. Speed reduction measures including "gates" (limiting the road to half-width) and humps were installed in 2009.

In 2012, residents unsuccessfully opposed plans for a new sports pavilion in the land to the West of the road.

Sedley Taylor Road is mentioned in Tom Sharpe's book Grantchester Grind as the home of the widow of local solicitor, Waxthorne.
