= Ofenhorn =

Mountain in Switzerland

- Punta d'Arbola
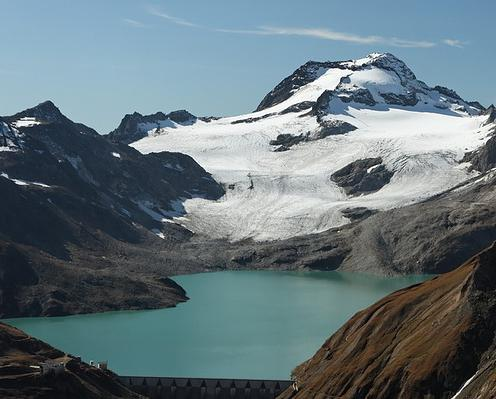
- The Ofenhorn from Lago del Sabbione

Highest point
- Elevation: 3,235 m (10,614 ft)
- Prominence: 334 m (1,096 ft)
- Parent peak: Blinnenhorn
- Listing: Alpine mountains above 3000 m
- Coordinates: 46°23′13″N 8°19′07″E

Geography
- Location within Alps
- Location: Piedmont, Italy/Valais, Switzerland
- Parent range: Lepontine Alps

The Ofenhorn (also known as Punta d'Arbola) is a mountain of the Lepontine Alps on the Swiss-Italian border. It is located between the valleys of Binn and Formazza.
