= Andreas Nilsen Rygg =

Norwegian-American writer

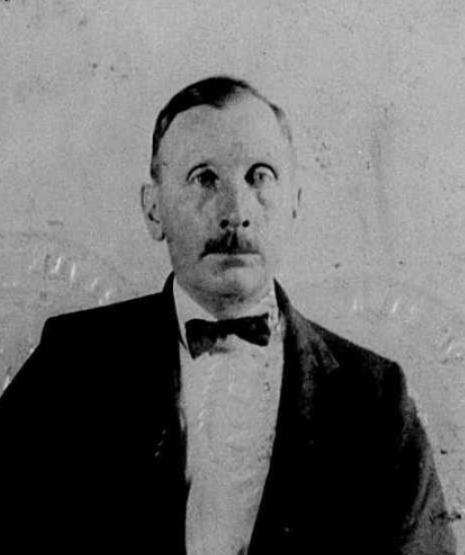
Norwegian-American journalist, newspaper editor and author Andreas Nilsen Rygg in 1923

Andreas Nilsen Rygg (15 August 1868 – 21 September 1951) was a Norwegian-American journalist, newspaper editor and author. He is most associated with his 1941 study, Norwegians in New York 1825–1925.

== Background ==
Andreas Nilsen Rygg was born in Stavanger in Rogaland, Norway. He was a brother of Nicolai Rygg, Governor of the Central Bank of Norway. In 1888, the 20-year-old Rygg immigrated to the United States and located in Chicago.

== Selected works ==
- Norwegians in New York 1825–1925 (1941)
- A Survey of American Relief Work For Norway During and After The Second World War (1947)
