= Gries Glacier =

Glacier in Switzerland

- Griesgletscher
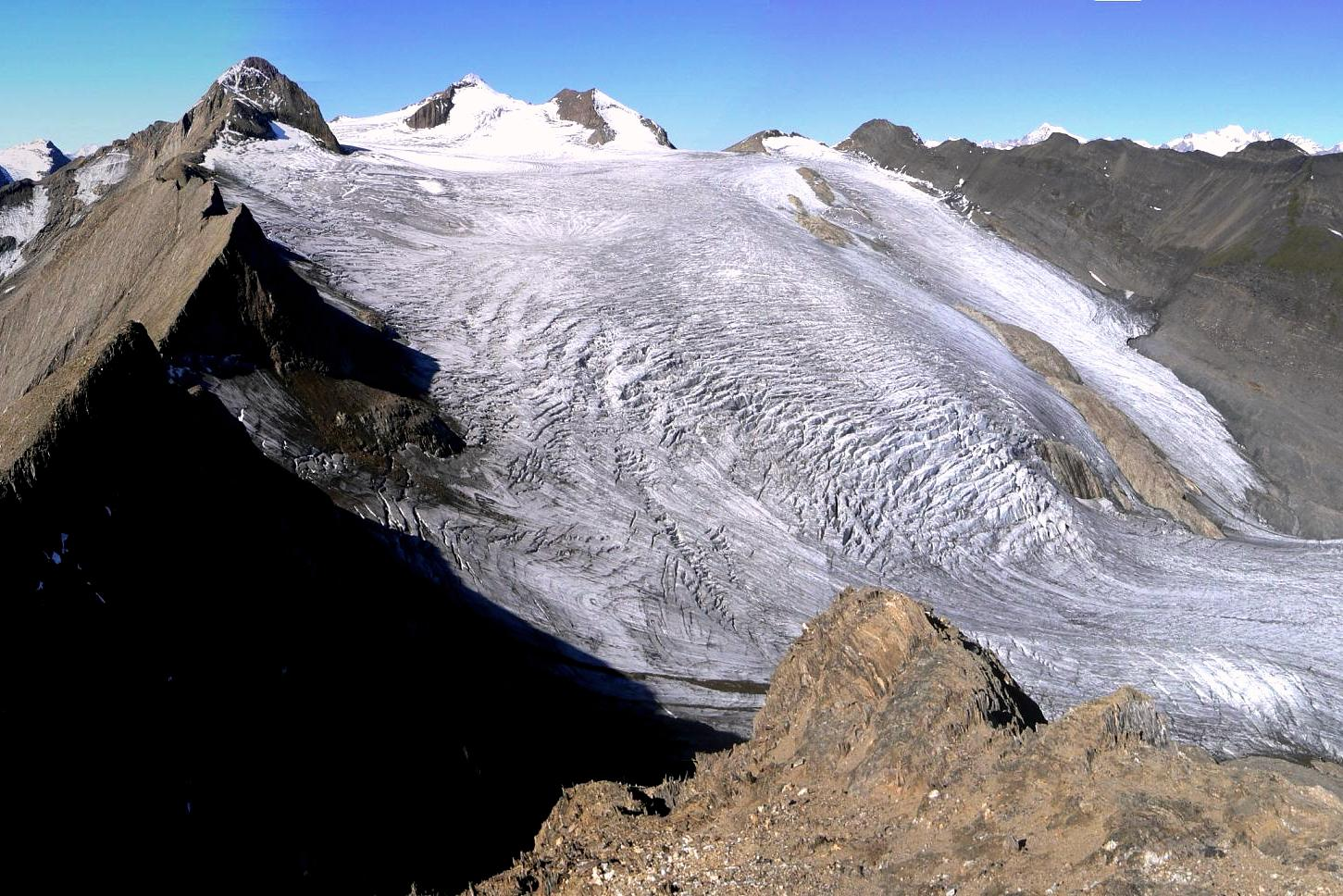
- The Blinnenhorn and Griesgletscher
- Interactive map of Gries Glacier
- Location: Valais, Switzerland
- Coordinates: 46°26′40″N 8°20′25″E
- Length: 5 km

The Gries Glacier (German: Griesgletscher) is a 5 km long glacier (2005) situated in the Lepontine Alps in the canton of Valais in Switzerland. In 1973 it had an area of 6.23 km^{2}. In 2008 it had an area of 5.26 km^{2}.

== History ==
Griesgletscher as well as the many surrounding Swiss Alpine glaciers have played an important role in the cultural and economic development of the Swiss Alps. During the Second World War owing to its proximity to the Swiss/Italian frontier the Swiss Army constructed a series of look-out posts and foxholes to reinforce this relatively undefined border area and as part of Switzerland hydro-electric building programme. A dam was built in front of the glacier, however the resulting dam contributed to the increased retreat of the glacier thanks to the glacier becoming decoupled from the bedrock as water levels in the dam increased.

== Scientific research ==
Over the years there has been a great deal of scientific research undertaken on Griesgletscher thanks to its accessibility and its unique ability to display a wide range of glaciological features within such a small manageable area. Some of the first studies of Griesgletcher were undertaken by M.J. Hambrey and were published in 1977 and 1980. The first was an investigation into the structures of ice cliffs at the snout of Griesgletscher. Griesgletscher was described as being relatively simple in shape, yet the structures being complex in detail. The 1980 study was on the dynamics and structure in which the velocity, rate of ice deformation with movement, and cumulative strains at various points on the glacier were investigated to determine how the glacier behaved as it moved. Other scientific research has been climate/glacier based in which the amount of glacier melting was correlated to local climatic variables such as sunlight, humidity, wind direction.

== Other geological and scientific features ==
However, Griesgletscher has been rapidly retreating over the last decade – a retreat that has been monitored through extensive geological and glaciological research. The glacier, despite its size, is one of the most interesting and most widely studied in the Swiss Alps and during the last Ice Age was the source of a large tributary glacier that once fed into the main glacier that once flowed down the valley known today as Goms The glacier has a very well developed supra glacial and sub glacial drainage system, which becomes very evident during the summer months and before the recent rapid glacial retreat the glacier terminated in the man-made dam, with high ice cliffs. Surface features include glacial moraines as the glacier releases debris that has been eroded and then entrained by the glacier. The profile of the glacier is a very convex terminus, which progresses into a very gentle concave mid profile with very crevassed ice field near to the upper accumulation zone - an area which is highly dangerous and difficult to traverse.

== See also ==
- List of glaciers in Switzerland
- Swiss Alps
