= Blinnenhorn =

Mountain in Switzerland

- Corno Cieco
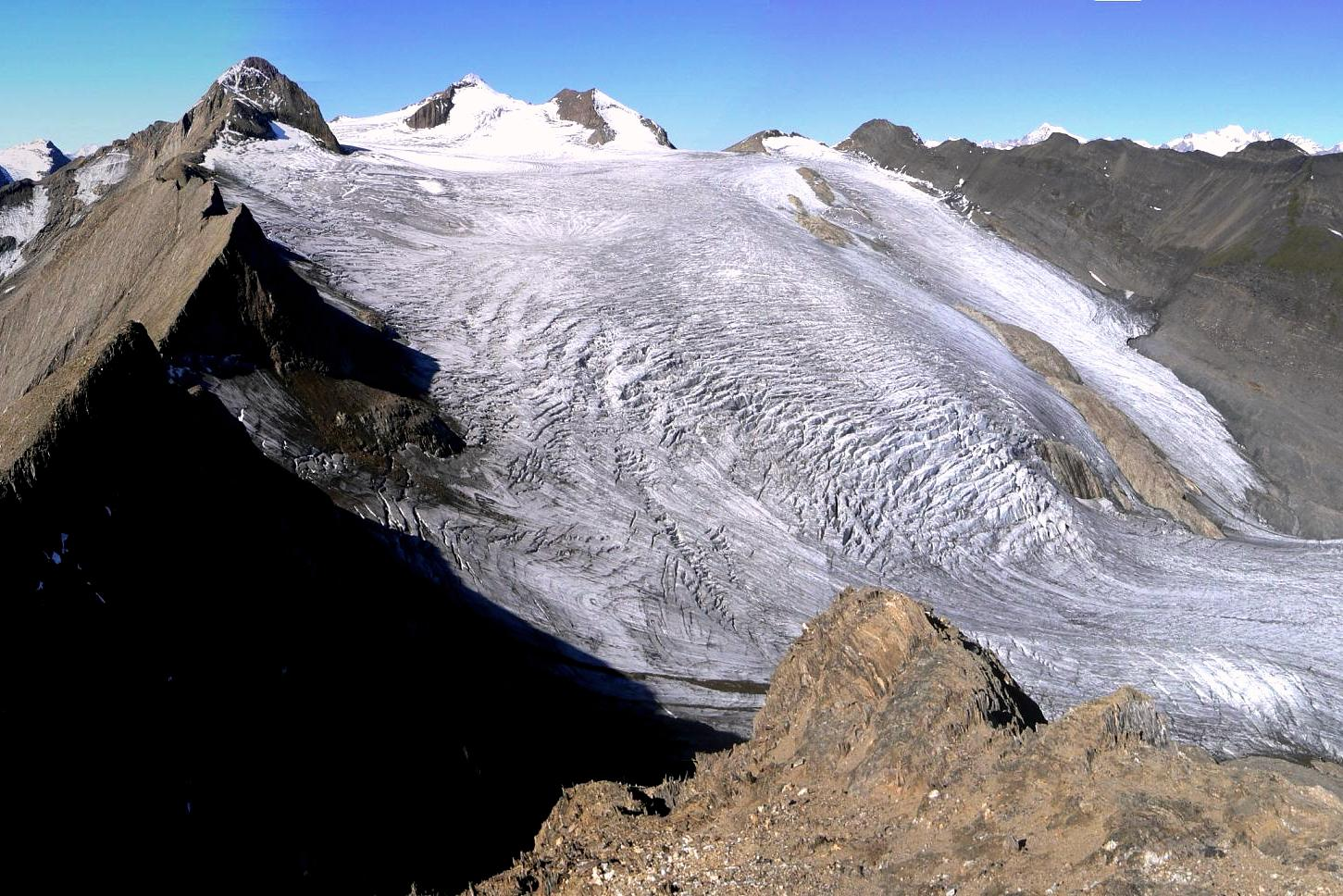
- The north-east side of the Blinnenhorn with the Gries Glacier

Highest point
- Elevation: 3,374 m (11,070 ft)
- Prominence: 945 m (3,100 ft)
- Parent peak: Dammastock
- Isolation: 12.8 km (8.0 mi)
- Listing: Alpine mountains above 3000 m
- Coordinates: 46°25′33.4″N 8°18′28.9″E

Geography
- Location within Alps
- Location: Valais, Switzerland/Piedmont, Italy
- Parent range: Lepontine Alps

Climbing
- First ascent: 5 September 1866 by Sedley Taylor, Johann Tännler, and Franz Guntern (or Guntren)

The Blinnenhorn (German) or Corno Cieco (Italian) is a mountain in the Lepontine Alps, located on the border between Italy and Switzerland. On the north-east side lies the Gries Glacier.

== See also ==
- List of mountains of Valais
- List of most isolated mountains of Switzerland
