= Sedley Taylor =

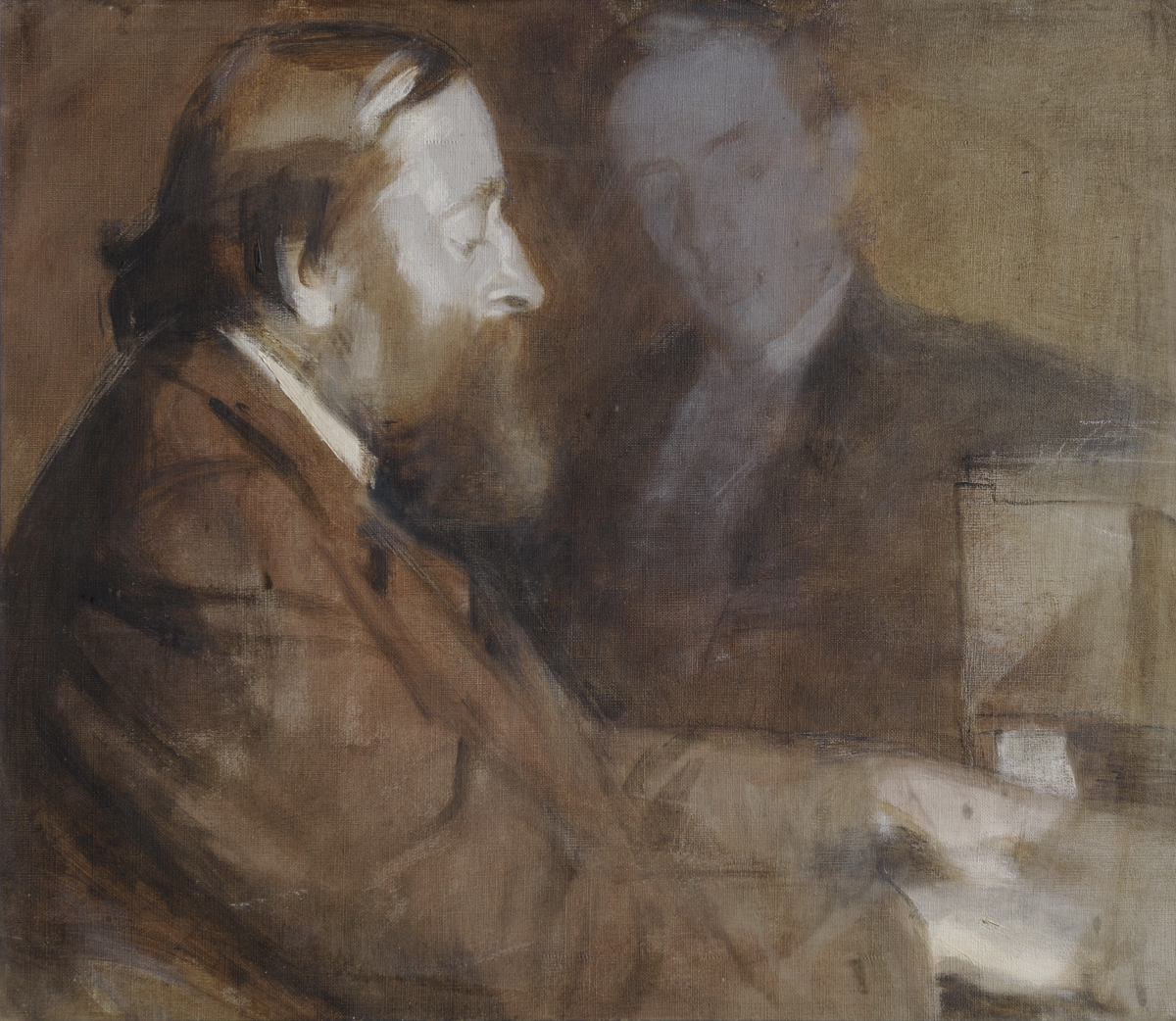
Sedley Taylor painted by Margaret Bernadine Hall, 1898

Sedley Taylor (29 November 1834 – 14 March 1920) was a British academic, librarian and one of the Professors at the Trinity College in Cambridge, England. He is known for his works on the science of music and on profit-sharing in industry.

== Biography ==
Born at Kingston upon Thames, Surrey as the son of a surgeon, Taylor attended the University College School in London, and received his BA in theology in 1859 and his MA in 1862.

Taylor was ordained to a curacy near Birmingham, but withdrawal from active theological pursuits in 1863. He was a proponent of the movement for greater academic freedom at Cambridge. Taylor became a Fellow at the Trinity College in Cambridge, but gave up his fellowship about the same time Henry Sidgwick (1869) and Leslie Stephen (1862) gave up theirs.

Taylor kept affiliated with the Trinity College without a post in College, and expended his research interests from theology, mathematics, physical science, practical economics to preeminently music.

== Work ==
=== Sound and Music, 1873 ===
In 1873 Taylor published the "Sound and Music." According to Cyril Rootham (1920):

"Sound and Music," was... the earliest general exposition in short compass by a writer competent on both sides of the subject. An event which his characteristic energy rendered prominent was his invention of an apparatus which he named the phoneidoscope. It consisted essentially of a resonant cavity, with an aperture over which a soap-film was stretched: when the operator sang to it a note nearly in unison with the cavity, the aerial vibrations revealed themselves visibly in whirling movement of the coloured striations of the liquid film.

=== Helmholtz’s classical treatise on the sensations of tone, 1875 ===
Taylor's translated into English Hermann von Helmholtz's 1862 classical treatise on the sensations of tone. The work was published by A. J. Ellis in 1875, and increased its reaction in Britain "both on the physical theory of sound and on the aesthetic principles of music, which it for the first time brought into detailed, reasoned connection."

=== Profit-Sharing between Capital and Labour, (1884) ===
In 1884 Taylor published "Profit Sharing between Capital and Labour." This was a series of six essays on the topic supplemented by a memorandum on the Industrial Partnership at the Whitwood Collieries (1865–1874) by Archibald Briggs and Henry C. Briggs. According to Hugo Diemer (1904):

These essays give an account of the work of the French house-painter, Leclaire, who, in 1842, started a cooperative system from which the present methods of profit-sharing in France have developed. It also includes a description of the work of the society established in 1879 to promote the study of the system and to extend its use. The essays include: Profit Sharing in the Maison Leclaire, Profit Sharing in Industry, Profit Sharing in the Paris and Orleans Railway Company, Profit Sharing in Agriculture, and Profit Sharing in Distributive Enterprise; these all relating to applications in French industry. The Briggs memorandum describes the practical operation of the experiment in profit-sharing at the Whitwood Colliery between 1865 and 1874.

== Municipal work ==
In 1907 Sedley Taylor offered £500 to Cambridge Borough Council to pay for the dental inspection of every school child at a council-funded school. This led to the founding of the first municipal dental clinic in the country. Around 1,300 children had had their teeth checked by a qualified dentist at the new Cambridge Dental Institute in the first year.

Sedley Taylor Road in west Cambridge is named after him.

== Selected publications ==
- Sedley Taylor. The system of clerical subscription in the Church of England: its unjustifiable character and injurious results examined The system of clerical subscription in the Church of England: its unjustifiable character and injurious results. first published in 1869.
- Sedley Taylor. The science of music: or, The Physical basis of musical harmony. 1875; 2ns ed. 1883,
- Sedley Taylor. The Earl of Beaconsfield and the Conservative reform bill of 1867: A lecture, delivered at the Cambridge Reform Club, on Monday, November 13, 1876. The National Press Agency, 1877.
- Sedley Taylor. The participation of labour in the profits of enterprise: paper read before the Society of Arts on Wednesday, 16 February 1881 by Sedley Taylor, M.A., late fellow of Trinity College, Cambridge, together with report of the discussion at the above meeting and at the adjourned meeting on Friday, 25 February 1881. 1881.
- Sedley Taylor. Profit Sharing between Capital and Labour, Six Essays; 1885.
- Sedley Taylor. The life of John Sebastian Bach in relation to his work as a church musician and composer, Macmillan & Bowes, 1897.
- Taylor, Sedley. The indebtedness of Handel to works by other composers: a presentation of evidence. University Press, 1906.

Articles, a selection

- Taylor, Sedley. "IV. On variations of pitch in beats." The London, Edinburgh, and Dublin Philosophical Magazine and Journal of Science 44.290 (1872): 56–64.
- Taylor, Sedley. "Experiments on the Colours Shown by Thin Liquid Films under the Action of Sonorous Vibrations." Proceedings of the Royal Society of London 27.185–189 (1878): 71–76.
