= Tiefenbach DFB railway station =

Railway station in Switzerland

Tiefenbach DFB
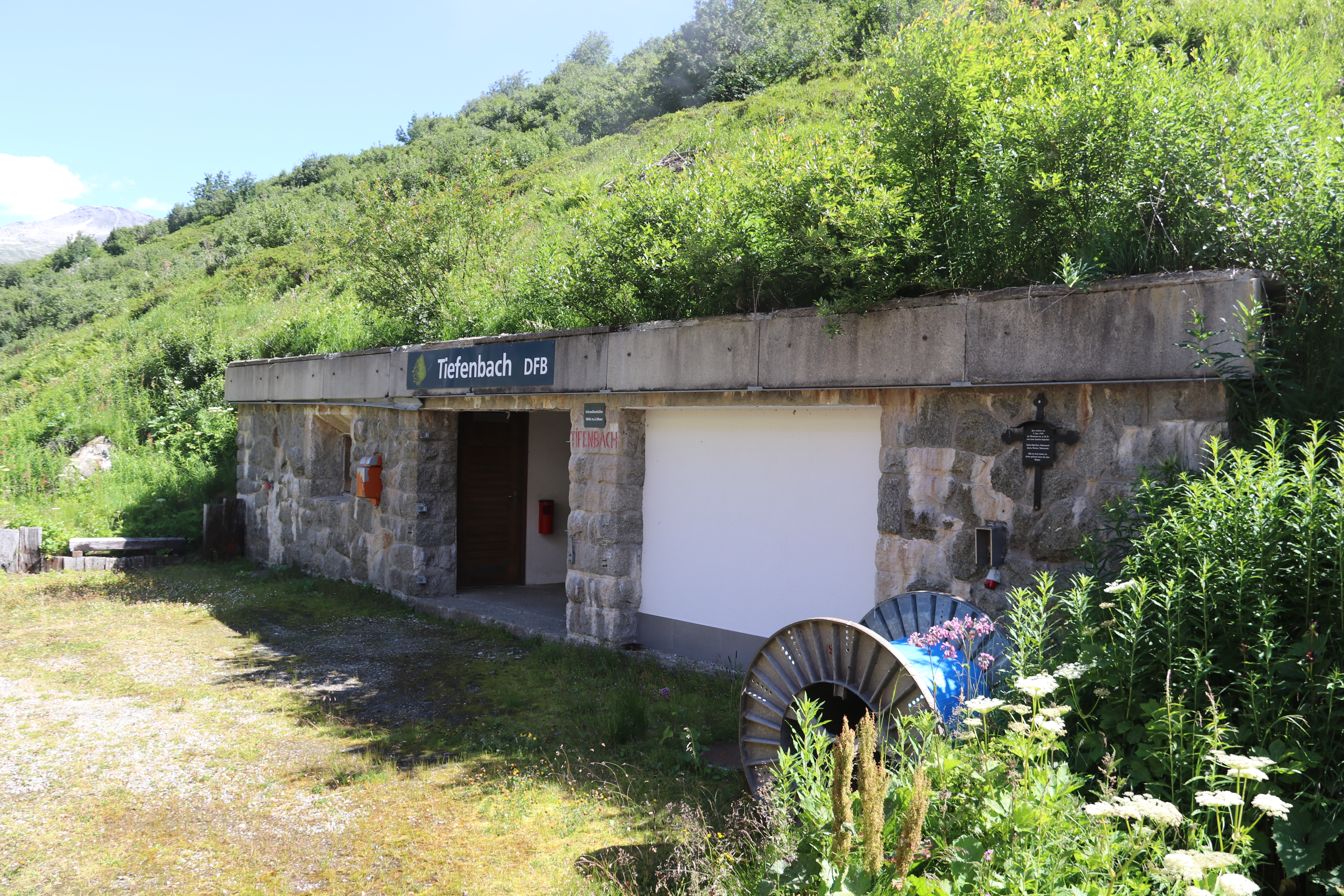
- Facilities at the station in 2020

General information
- Location: Realp; Switzerland
- Coordinates: 46°35′N 8°28′E
- Elevation: 1,846 m (6,056 ft)
- Owner: Furka Steam Railway
- Line: Furka Steam Railway
- Train operators: Furka Steam Railway

History
- Opened: 3 July 1926
- Electrified: 1 July 1942

Services
Preceding station	Furka Steam Railway	Following station
Furka DFB towards Oberwald	Oberwald to Realp	Realp DFB Terminus
Location
- Location within Switzerland

Tiefenbach DFB railway station (Alemannic German: Haltestelle Tiefenbach) is a metre gauge railway passenger facility, on the eastern side of the Furka Pass, in the Canton of Uri, Switzerland.

In the Swiss German dialect, the expression Haltestelle normally refers to a railway facility without points or switches, where scheduled trains are allowed to stop, depart or terminate. Tiefenbach is not strictly a facility of that kind, because it is actually a crossing loop, with a point or switch at each end. Nevertheless, the word Haltestelle is the expression most often used to describe it, perhaps because for such a rudimentary facility, Haltestelle seems more appropriate than Bahnhof.

Between 1926 and 1981, Tiefenbach formed part of the Furka Oberalp Bahn (FO). The portion of the FO on which it is located was then replaced by the Furka Base Tunnel in 1982. Since being reopened in 1992, Tiefenbach has been owned and operated by a heritage railway, the Furka Steam Railway (German: Dampfbahn Furka-Bergstrecke) (DFB).

== History and description ==
Tiefenbach was first opened in 1926. Nominally, it serves the village of Tiefenbach UR, which consists essentially of the Hotel Tiefenbach and some outbuildings. However, the village is located on the Furka Pass road, about 265 metres (869 ft) higher in altitude than the railway halting point. The back of the Tiefenbach station building is built into the side of the mountain, to give the building some protection from the annual avalanches. For that reason, only the façade of the station building is visible.

Between 1926 and 1981, Muttbach-Belvédère was owned and operated by the FO, which connects Brig in Valais, via Andermatt in Uri, with Göschenen, Uri, and Disentis/Mustér, Graubünden. In 1982, the original portion of the FO between Oberwald in Valais and Realp in Uri, including Muttbach-Belvédère, was replaced by an FO line passing through the then new Furka Base Tunnel. The superseded portion of the FO line was abandoned.

Since 11 July 1992, the abandoned portion of the FO line has been progressively reopened from Realp, as a heritage railway operated by the DFB. The first portion to be reopened was the section between Realp and Tiefenbach. On 30 July 1993, the DFB was extended from its then temporary terminus at Tiefenbach to Furka, which is 3.34 kilometres (2.08 mi) further up the DFB line. It has since been further extended, and will shortly be extended again.

Immediately to the west of Tiefenbach, westbound trains operating on the DFB line begin an 11.0% climb towards Furka, with the assistance of an Abt rack rail system.

== See also ==
- Realp railway station
- Furka railway station
- Furka Summit Tunnel
- Furka Base Tunnel
- Furka Oberalp Bahn
- Furka Steam Railway
