= Muttbach-Belvédère railway station =

Railway station in Obergoms, Switzerland

Muttbach-Belvédère
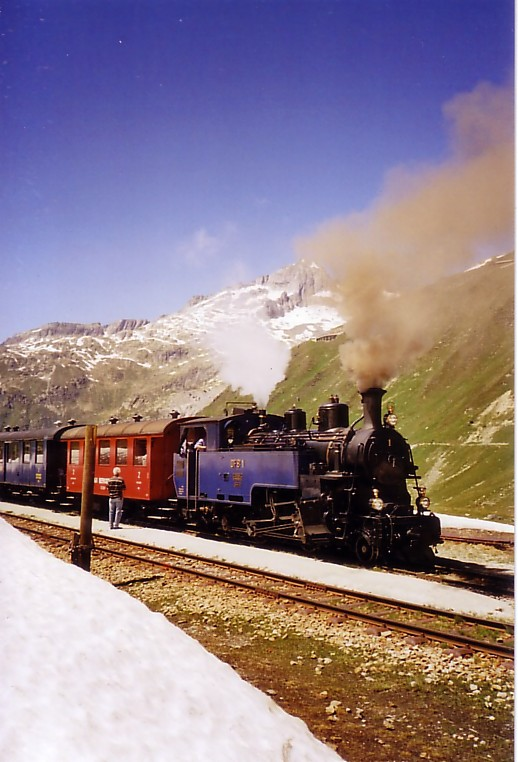
- DFB train at Muttbach-Belvédère, July 2006.

General information
- Location: Obergoms; Switzerland
- Coordinates: 46°34′02″N 8°24′16″E
- Elevation: 2,118 m (6,949 ft)
- Owner: Furka Steam Railway
- Line: Furka Steam Railway
- Distance: 9.206 km (5.720 mi) from Realp DFB
- Platforms: 2
- Tracks: 2
- Train operators: Furka Steam Railway

Other information
- Station code: 8501634

History
- Opened: 3 July 1926
- Electrified: 1 July 1942

Services
Preceding station	Furka Steam Railway	Following station
Gletsch towards Oberwald	Oberwald to Realp	Furka DFB towards Realp DFB
Location

Muttbach-Belvédère railway station (Alemannic German: Haltestelle Muttbach-Belvédère) is a metre gauge railway passenger facility, at the western portal of the Furka Summit Tunnel, in the Canton of Valais, Switzerland.

In the Swiss German dialect, the expression Haltestelle normally refers to a railway facility without points or switches, where scheduled trains are allowed to stop, depart or terminate. Muttbach-Belvédère is not strictly a facility of that kind, because it is actually a crossing loop, with a point or switch at each end. Nevertheless, the word Haltestelle is the expression most often used to describe it, perhaps because for such a rudimentary facility, Haltestelle seems more appropriate than Bahnhof.

Between 1926 and 1981, Muttbach-Belvédère formed part of the Furka Oberalp Bahn (FO). The portion of the FO on which it is located was then replaced by the Furka Base Tunnel in 1982. Since being reopened in 2000, Muttbach-Belvédère has been owned and operated by a heritage railway, the Furka Steam Railway (German: Dampfbahn Furka-Bergstrecke) (DFB).

== History ==
Muttbach-Belvédère was opened in 1926, upon the opening of the portion of the FO between Gletsch and Realp. It is located in a scenic and environmentally significant location, and was constructed on top of spoil that had been excavated from the Summit Tunnel.

The first part of its name, "Muttbach", is also the name of the adjacent stream that drains from the Mutt Glacier. "Belvédère", the rest of its name, refers to a well known hotel and lookout situated nearby, on the Furka Pass high above the Rhone Glacier. (Part of the James Bond movie Goldfinger was filmed between the Belvédère Hotel and the small curved part of the Pass above Realp.)

Between 1926 and 1981, Muttbach-Belvédère was owned and operated by the FO, which connects Brig in Valais, via Andermatt in Uri, with Göschenen, Uri, and Disentis/Mustér, Graubünden. In 1982, the original portion of the FO between Oberwald in Valais and Realp in Uri, including Muttbach-Belvédère, was replaced by an FO line passing through the then new Furka Base Tunnel. The superseded portion of the FO line was abandoned.

Since 11 July 1992, the abandoned portion of the FO line has been progressively reopened from Realp, as a heritage railway operated by the DFB. On 14 July 2000, the DFB was extended from its then temporary terminus at Furka to Gletsch, via the Summit Tunnel and Muttbach-Belvédère, which was simultaneously reopened.

Immediately to the west of Muttbach-Belvédère, westbound trains operating on the DFB line begin an 11.8% descent towards Gletsch, with the assistance of an Abt rack rail system.

== Services ==
As of the December 2023 timetable change, the following services stop at Gletsch:

- DFB heritage train services between Oberwald and Realp, only between June and October.

== See also ==
- Furka railway station
- Gletsch railway station
- Furka Summit Tunnel
- Furka Base Tunnel
- Furka Oberalp Bahn
- Furka Steam Railway
- List of highest railway stations in Switzerland
