= Furka DFB railway station =

Railway station in Switzerland

Furka DFB
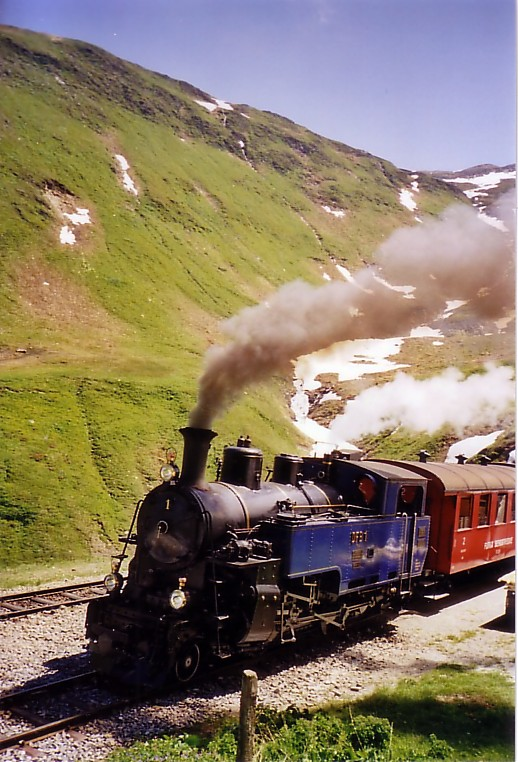
- DFB train at Furka, July 2006.

General information
- Location: Realp; Switzerland
- Coordinates: 46°34′34″N 8°25′42″E
- Elevation: 2,163 m (7,096 ft)
- Owner: Furka Steam Railway
- Line: Furka Steam Railway
- Distance: 6.996 km (4.347 mi) from Realp DFB
- Train operators: Furka Steam Railway

History
- Opened: 3 July 1926
- Electrified: 1 July 1942

Services
Preceding station	Furka Steam Railway	Following station
Muttbach-Belvédère towards Oberwald	Oberwald to Realp	Tiefenbach DFB towards Realp DFB
Location
- Location within Switzerland

Furka DFB railway station is a metre gauge railway station at the eastern portal of the Furka Summit Tunnel, in the Canton of Uri, Switzerland. The station was opened in 1926. It was then owned and operated from that point until 1981 by the Furka Oberalp Bahn (FO), which connects Brig in Valais, via Andermatt in Uri, with Göschenen, Uri, and Disentis/Mustér, Graubünden.

In 1982, the original portion of the FO between Oberwald in Valais and Realp in Uri, including the Furka railway station, was replaced by an FO line passing through the then new Furka Base Tunnel. The superseded portion of the FO line was abandoned.

Since 11 July 1992, the abandoned portion of the FO line has been progressively reopened from Realp, as a heritage railway operated by the Furka Steam Railway (DFB). On 30 July 1993, the DFB was extended from its then temporary terminus at Tiefenbach to Furka via the Steinstafel Viaduct, and the station at Furka was reopened. The station building, reconstructed for the reopening, houses a small restaurant, public conveniences, and a modern block system to control safeworking in the Summit Tunnel.

On 14 July 2000, the DFB was extended further, from Furka to Gletsch, via the Furka Summit Tunnel.

Furka is the summit of the DFB line, as well as the highest railway station in the canton of Uri. As a general rule, DFB steam locomotives travel downhill with the driving cab facing in the direction of travel, to optimise water levels in the locomotives' boilers. A DFB steam locomotive operating a train between Realp and Gletsch therefore usually needs to be turned on Furka's restored turntable, in preparation for its descent.

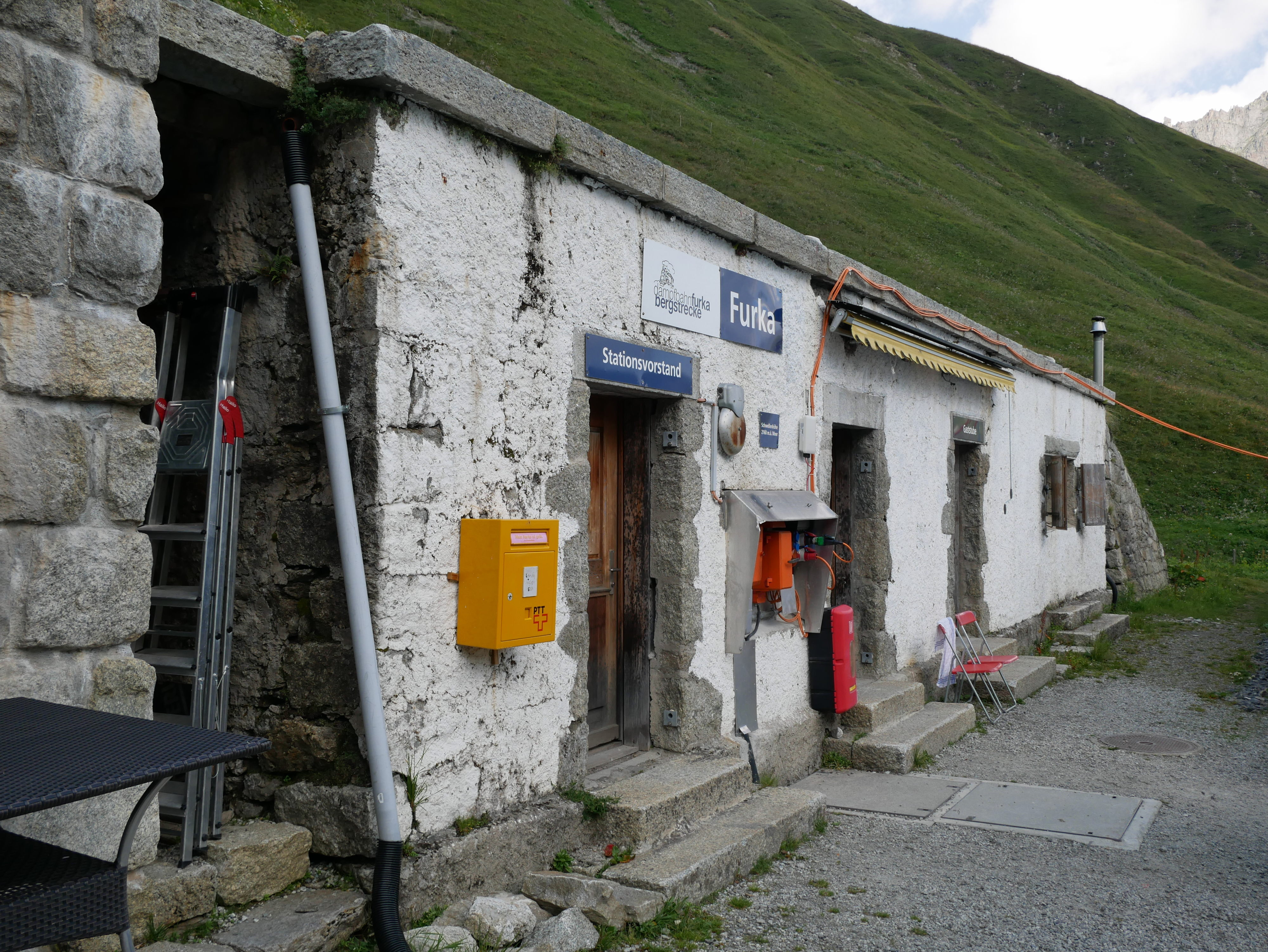
station building (2021)

== See also ==
- Tiefenbach halting point, Switzerland
- Furka Summit Tunnel
- Furka Base Tunnel
- Furka Oberalp Bahn
- Furka Steam Railway
- List of highest railway stations in Switzerland
