= Realp DFB railway station =

Railway station in Switzerland

Realp DFB
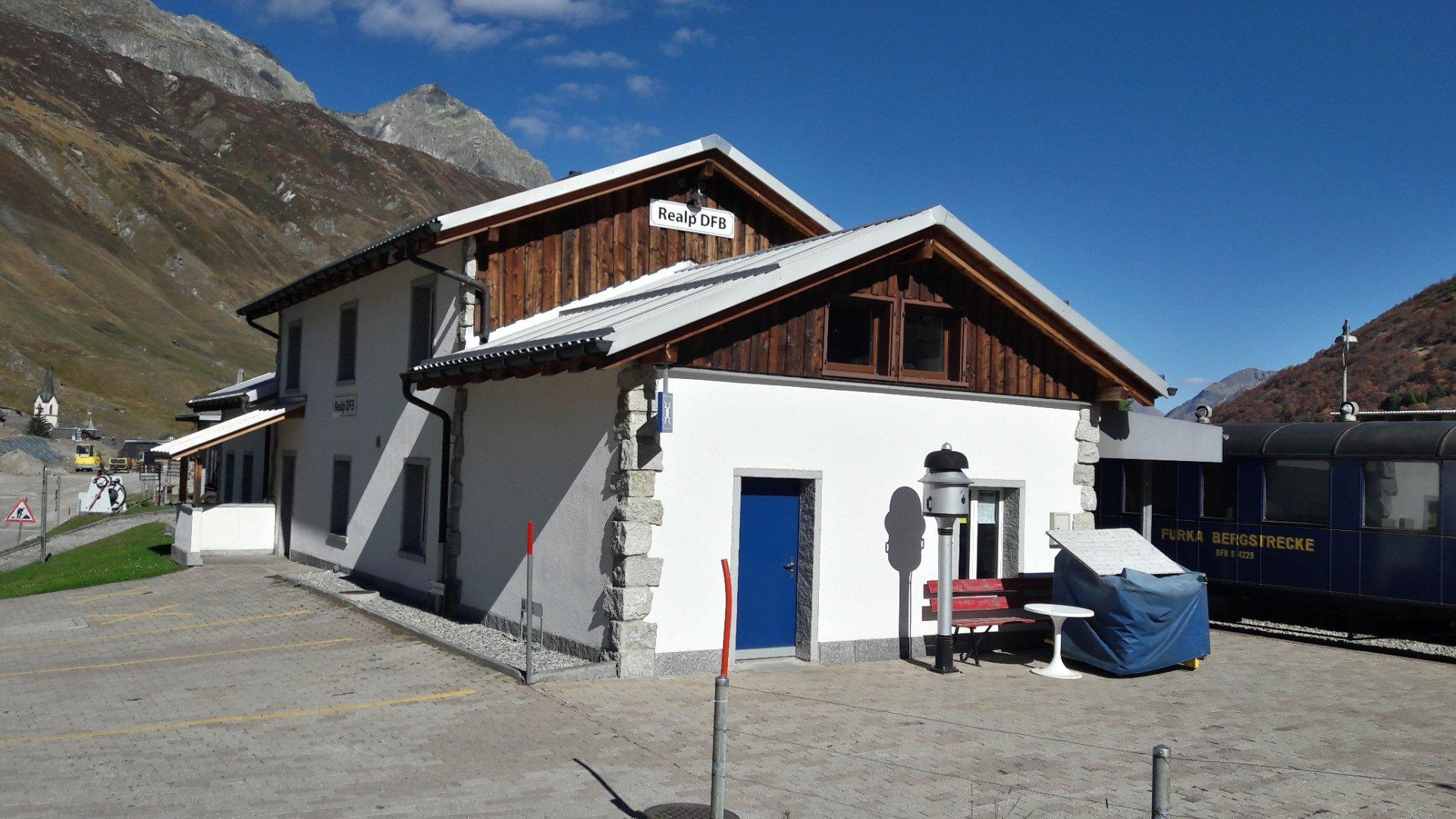
- The station building in 2018

General information
- Location: Realp; Switzerland
- Coordinates: 46°35′44″N 8°30′05″E
- Owner: Furka Steam Railway
- Line: Furka Steam Railway
- Train operators: Furka Steam Railway

Services
| Preceding station | Furka Steam Railway | Following station |
|---|---|---|
| Tiefenbach DFB towards Oberwald | Oberwald to Realp | Terminus |
Location
- Location within Switzerland Location within Canton of Uri

Realp DFB railway station (German: Bahnhof Realp DFB) is a railway station in the municipality of Realp, in the Swiss canton of Uri. It is the eastern terminus of the Furka Steam Railway, a heritage railway that operates over the Furka Pass route. Regular service through the Furka Base Tunnel uses Realp railway station, roughly 400 metres (1,300 ft) to the north.

== History ==
Following the opening of the Furka Base Tunnel in 1982, the original FO line over the Furka Pass between Realp and Oberwald was abandoned. However, that line has been progressively reopened since 1992, as a heritage railway operated by the DFB.

The first portion to be reopened was the section between Realp and Tiefenbach, which has been operational once again since 11 July 1992, with its Realp terminus being at Realp DFB. On 30 July 1993, the DFB was extended from its then temporary terminus at Tiefenbach to Furka. It has since been further extended, through the Furka Summit Tunnel and Muttbach-Belvédère to Gletsch.

At a ceremony to be held on 12 August 2010, the rest of the superseded ex-FO line will return to operation, following the completion of another DFB extension, this time from Gletsch to Oberwald. The formal reopening of that portion of the line followed the driving of a gold spike at a ceremony on June 18, 2010, to mark its physical reconnection.

Scheduled DFB services between Gletsch and Oberwald will then commence on 13 August 2010. From that point onwards, there will once again be a train service from Realp all the way over the Furka Pass to Oberwald and return.

== Services ==
The following services stop at Realp DFB:

- From June–September, three round trips on weekends and holidays to Oberwald.
