= Gletsch railway station =

Railway station in canton of Valais, Switzerland

Gletsch
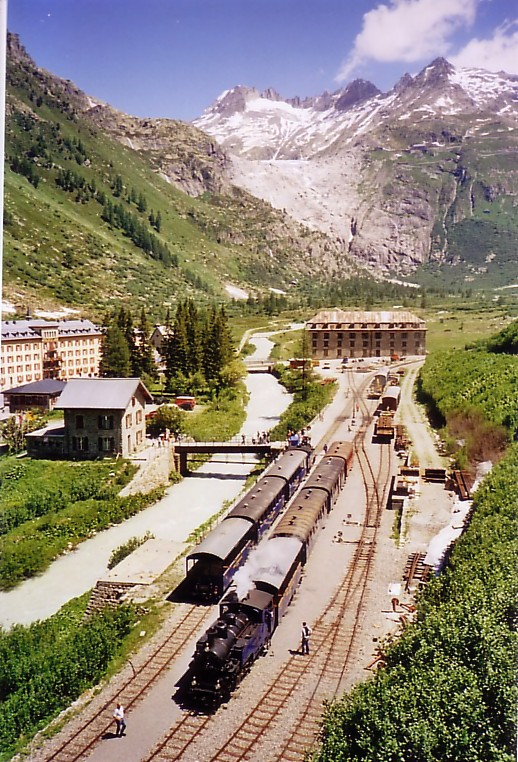
- Two DFB trains at Gletsch, July 2006.

General information
- Location: Obergoms; Switzerland
- Coordinates: 46°33′41″N 8°21′41″E
- Elevation: 1,757 m (5,764 ft)
- Owner: Furka Steam Railway
- Line: Furka Steam Railway
- Distance: 12.90 km (8.02 mi) from Realp DFB
- Tracks: 3
- Train operators: Furka Steam Railway
- Connections: PostAuto AG buses

Other information
- Station code: 8501635

History
- Opened: 30 June 1914
- Electrified: 1 July 1942

Services
| Preceding station | Furka Steam Railway | Following station |
|---|---|---|
| Oberwald Terminus | Oberwald to Realp | Muttbach-Belvédère towards Realp DFB |
Location

Gletsch railway station is a 1,000 mm (3 ft 3 3/8 in) metre gauge metre gauge railway station serving the village of Gletsch, in the Canton of Valais, Switzerland.

== History and operations ==
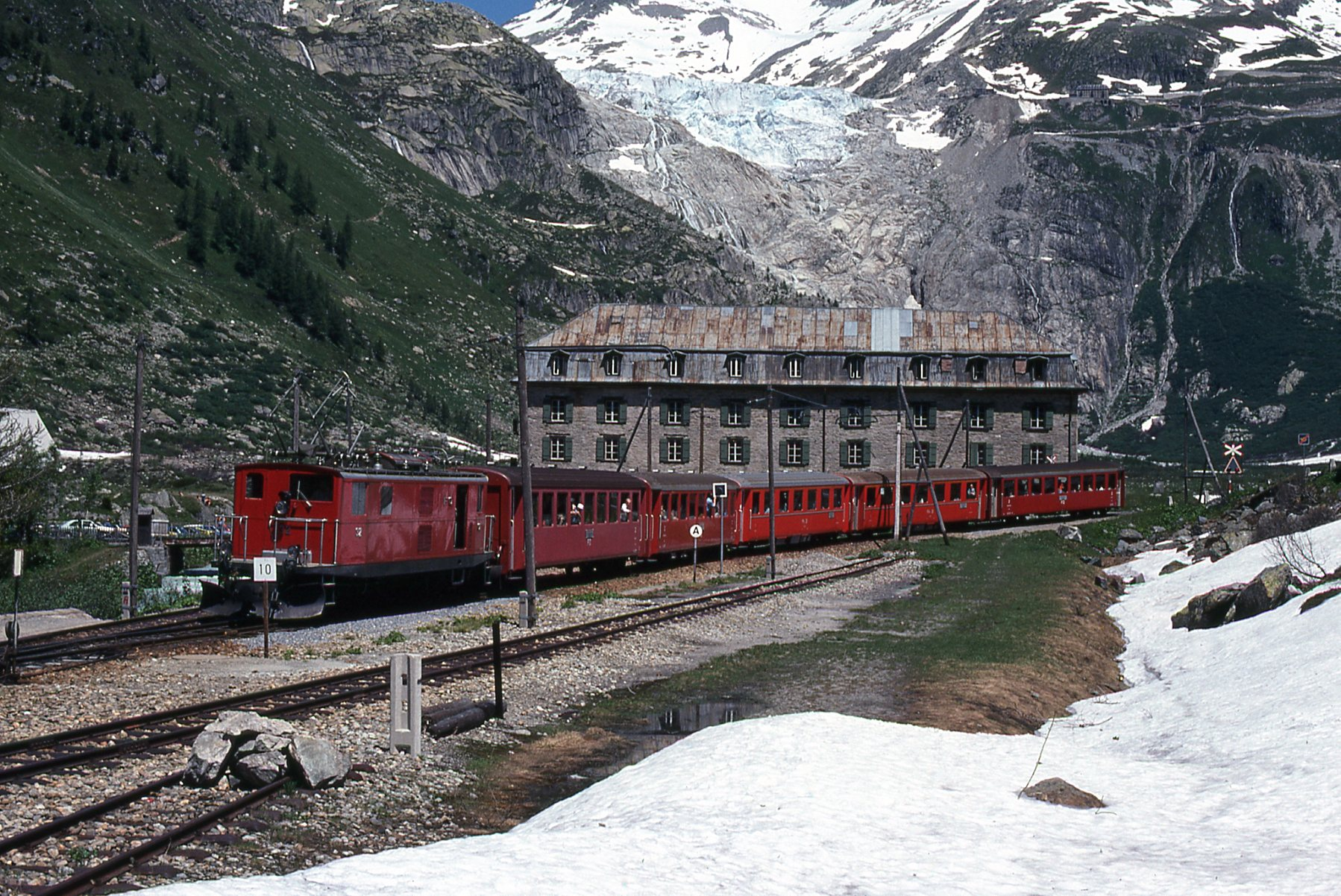
Gletsch railway station, ca 1980.

The station was opened in 1914, and owned and operated from then until 1981 by the Furka Oberalp Bahn (FO), which connects Brig in Valais, via the base tunnel and Andermatt in Uri, with Göschenen, Uri, and Disentis/Mustér, Graubünden.

In 1982, the original portion of the FO between Oberwald in Valais and Realp in Uri, including the Gletsch railway station, was replaced by an FO line passing through the then new Furka Base Tunnel. The superseded portion of the FO line was abandoned.

Since 11 July 1992, the abandoned portion of FO line has been progressively reopened from Realp, as a heritage railway operated by the Furka Steam Railway (DFB). On 14 July 2000, the DFB was extended from its then temporary terminus at Furka to Gletsch via the Furka Summit Tunnel, and the station at Gletsch was reopened.

At a ceremony held on 12 August 2010, the rest of the superseded ex-FO line was formally reopened, following the completion of another DFB extension, this time from Gletsch to Oberwald. At an earlier ceremony on 18 June 2010, a gold spike had been driven to mark the physical reconnection. Scheduled DFB services between Gletsch and Oberwald commenced on 13 August 2010.

== Services ==
As of the December 2023 timetable change, the following services stop at Gletsch:

- DFB heritage train services between Oberwald and Realp, only between June and October.

== See also ==
- History of rail transport in Switzerland
- Rail transport in Switzerland
