= Furka Tunnel =

Furka Tunnel may refer to either of the following railway tunnels between Uri and Valais in Switzerland:

- Furka Base Tunnel (opened 1982), between Realp and Oberwald, on the Furka Oberalp Bahn (now part of the Matterhorn Gotthard Bahn)
- Furka Summit Tunnel (opened 1925), between Furka and Muttbach-Belvédère (now part of a heritage railway, the Furka Cogwheel Steam Railway)
