= List of mountain railways in Switzerland =

Overview of high-altitude train lines in the Central European country

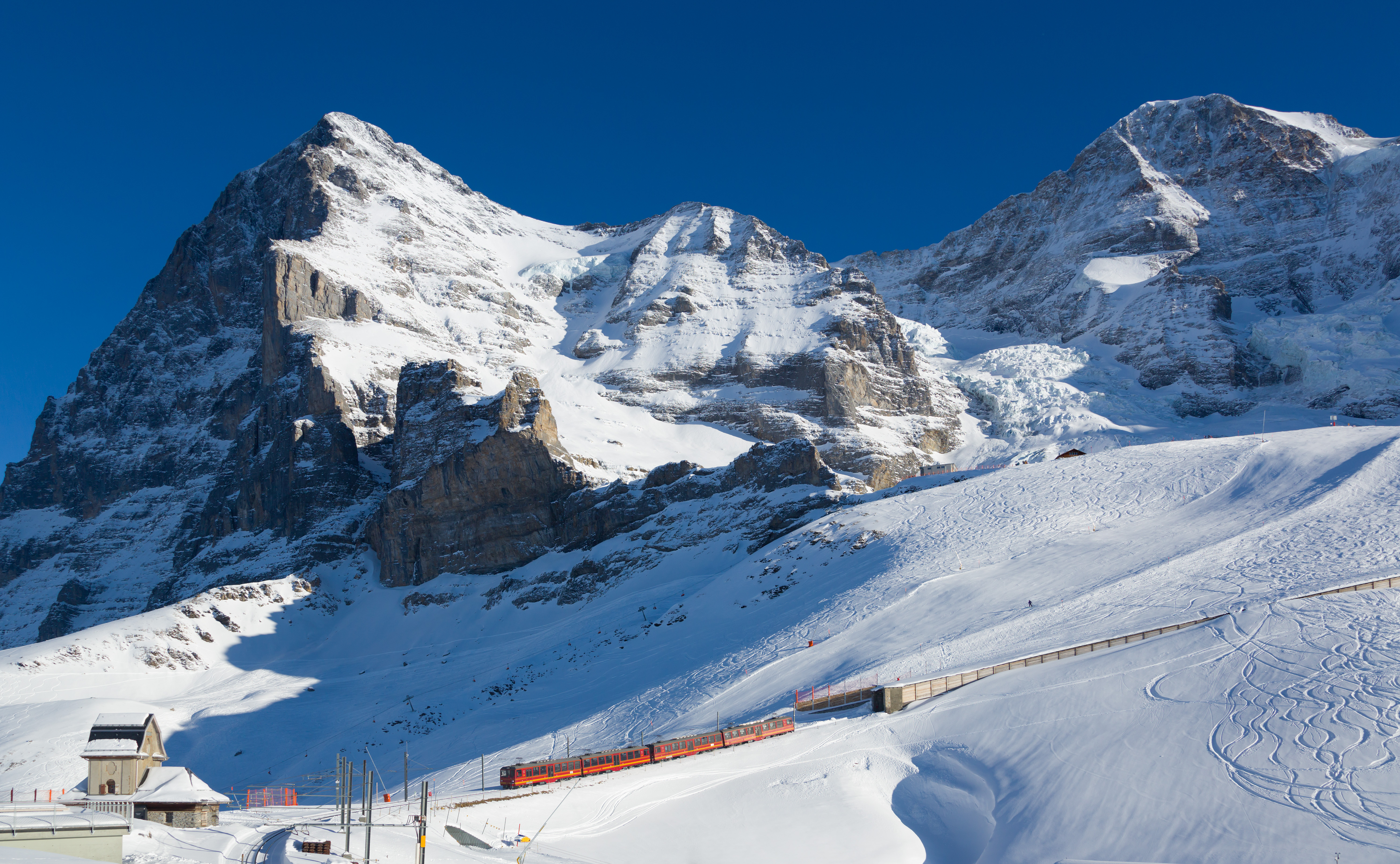
A train on the open-air section of the Jungfrau Railway, the highest in Europe

This is a list of mountain railways in operation in Switzerland. It includes railways that overcome steep gradients (over 5%) or whose culminating point is over 800 m (2,600 ft) above sea level. Most of them are located in the Alps, which include the highest European railways, both dead-end railways, such as the Jungfrau and Gornergrat, and railway crossings, such as the Bernina and Furka. Many of these railways converge on mountain railway hubs, notably Lucerne, Interlaken, Montreux, Aigle, Brig and Chur.

Lines that are both adhesion and standard gauge railways and part of the main Swiss (and European) rail network are boldfaced in the list. Cantons where the line continues but does not fit the aforementioned criteria are indicated in small letters.

This list only includes non-cable railways. For a list of funiculars, see List of funiculars in Switzerland, for a list of aerial tramways, see List of aerial tramways in Switzerland. For a list of individual railway stations, see List of highest railway stations in Switzerland.

== List ==
Railway	Canton(s)	Range	Highest point	Highest elevation	Maximum incline	Gauge	Rack railway	Type	Notes
Jungfrau	Bern/Valais	Alps	Jungfraujoch	3,454 m (11,332 ft)	25%	1,000 mm	Yes	Dead-end rail	Underground above 2,350 m, highest railway in Europe, one of the highest railways in the world at the opening
Gornergrat	Valais	Alps	Gornergrat	3,090 m (10,138 ft)	20%	1,000 mm	Yes	Dead-end rail	Highest open-air railway in Europe
Bernina	Graubünden	Alps	Ospizio Bernina	2,253 m (7,392 ft)	7%	1,000 mm	No	Rail crossing	Highest railway crossing in Europe
Brienz–Rothorn	Bern	Alps	Brienzer Rothorn	2,244 m (7,362 ft)	25%	800 mm	Yes	Dead-end rail	Highest unelectrified line in Europe
Riffelalp	Valais	Alps	Riffelalp Resort	2,222 m (7,290 ft)	5%	800 mm	No	Dead-end rail	Not electrified, highest tram line in Europe
Furka Steam Railway	Valais/Uri	Alps	Furka railway station	2,163 m (7,096 ft)	11.8%	1,000 mm	Yes	Rail crossing	Longest unelectrified line in Switzerland (18 km), seasonal operations
Pilatus	Obwalden	Alps	Pilatus	2,073 m (6,801 ft)	48%	800 mm	Yes	Dead-end rail	Steepest railway in the world
Lauterbrunnen–Kleine Scheidegg–Grindelwald	Bern	Alps	Kleine Scheidegg	2,061 m (6,762 ft)	25%	800 mm	Yes	Rail crossing	Rail crossing usually involves change of train at Kleine Scheidegg
Andermatt–Chur	Uri/Graubünden	Alps	Oberalp Pass	2,033 m (6,670 ft)	11%	1,000 mm	Yes	Rail crossing	
Montreux–Glion–Rochers-de-Naye	Vaud	Alps	Rochers de Naye	1,968 m (6,457 ft)	22%	800 mm	Yes	Dead-end rail	
Schynige Platte	Bern	Alps	Schynige Platte	1,967 m (6,453 ft)	25%	800 mm	Yes	Dead-end rail	
Les Montuires–Emosson	Valais	Alps	Les Montuires	1,822 m (5,978 ft)	1.46%	600 mm	No	Dead-end rail	Part of the Parc d'attractions du Châtelard
Albula	Graubünden	Alps	Albula Tunnel	1,820 m (5,971 ft)	3.5%	1,000 mm	No	Rail crossing	
Bex–Villars–Bretaye	Vaud	Alps	Bretaye	1,806 m (5,925 ft)	20%	1,000 mm	Yes	Dead-end rail	
Pontresina–Scuol-Tarasp	Graubünden	Alps	Pontresina	1,774 m (5,820 ft)	2.5%	1,000 mm	No	Dead-end rail	Lowest point at the terminus station (Scuol-Tarasp)
Rigi	Lucerne/Schwyz	Alps	Rigi Kulm	1,752 m (5,748 ft)	25%	1,435 mm	Yes	Rail crossing at Rigi Staffel, dead-end rail to the summit	Oldest mountain rack railway in Europe (1873), highest standard gauge in Europe, rail crossing involves change of train at Rigi Staffel
Chur–Arosa	Graubünden	Alps	Arosa	1,739 m (5,705 ft)	6%	1,000 mm	No	Dead-end rail	
Grütschalp–Mürren	Bern	Alps	Mürren	1,639 m (5,377 ft)	5%	1,000 mm	No	Dead-end rail	Accessible only by cable car
Landquart–Klosters–Davos	Graubünden	Alps	Davos Wolfgang	1,625 m (5,331 ft)	4.5%	1,000 mm	No	Rail crossing	
Visp–Zermatt	Valais	Alps	Zermatt	1,605 m (5,266 ft)	12.5%	1,000 mm	Yes	Dead-end rail	
Monte Generoso	Ticino	Alps	Generoso Vetta	1,601 m (5,253 ft)	22%	800 mm	Yes	Dead-end rail	
Brig–Andermatt	Valais/Uri	Alps	Realp	1,538 m (5,046 ft)		1,000 mm	Yes	Rail crossing	
Aigle–Leysin	Vaud	Alps	Leysin Grand Hôtel	1,450 m (4,757 ft)	23%	1,000 mm	Yes	Dead-end rail	
Göschenen–Andermatt	Uri	Alps	Andermatt	1,436 m (4,711 ft)	17.9%	1,000 mm	Yes	Rail crossing	
Vevey–Les Pléiades	Vaud	Alps	Les Pléiades	1,360 m (4,462 ft)	20%	1,000 mm	Yes	Dead-end rail	
Montbovon–Zweisimmen	Vaud/Fribourg/Bern	Alps	Saanenmöser Pass	1,279 m (4,196 ft)	7%	1,000 mm	No	Rail crossing	
**Lötschberg**	Bern/Valais	Alps	Lötschberg Tunnel	1,240 m (4,068 ft)	2.7%	1,435 mm	No	Rail crossing	Highest adhesion and standard gauge railway in Switzerland
Nyon–St-Cergue–La Cure	Vaud	Jura Mountains	Col de la Givrine	1,228 m (4,029 ft)	6%	1,000 mm	No	Dead-end rail	Highest railway in the Jura Mountains
Martigny–Châtelard	Valais	Alps	Finhaut	1,224 m (4,016 ft)	20%	1,000 mm	Yes	Rail crossing	International line
Aigle–Sépey–Diablerets	Vaud	Alps	Les Diablerets	1,155 m (3,789 ft)	6%	1,000 mm	No	Dead-end rail	
**Gotthard**	Uri/Ticino/Schwyz	Alps	Gotthard Tunnel	1,151 m (3,776 ft)	2.7%	1,435 mm	No	Rail crossing	
La Chaux-de-Fonds–Ponts-de-Martel	Neuchâtel	Jura Mountains	Above L'Abbaye	1,120 m (3,675 ft)		1,000 mm	No	Dead-end rail	
Montreux–Montbovon	Vaud/Fribourg	Alps	Les Cases	1,111 m (3,645 ft)	7%	1,000 mm	No	Rail crossing	
La Chaux-de-Fonds–Le Noirmont–Glovelier	Neuchâtel/Bern/Jura	Jura Mountains	Hotel de Bellevue	1,071 m (3,514 ft)		1,000 mm	No	Rail crossing	
Zweisimmen–Lenk	Bern	Alps	Lenk	1,068 m (3,504 ft)		1,000 mm	No	Dead-end rail	
Yverdon–Ste-Croix	Vaud	Jura Mountains	Sainte-Croix	1,066 m (3,497 ft)	4.4%	1,000 mm	No	Dead-end rail	
**Vallorbe–Le Brassus**	Vaud	Jura Mountains	Le Lieu	1,050 m (3,445 ft)	2.3%	1,435 mm	No	Dead-end rail	
**Neuchâtel–La Chaux-de-Fonds–Col-des-Roches**	Neuchâtel	Jura Mountains	Les Convers	1,048 m (3,438 ft)	3.1%	1,435 mm	No	Rail crossing	
Monthey–Champéry	Valais	Alps	Champéry (north station)	1,044 m (3,425 ft)	13.5%	1,000 mm	Yes	Dead-end rail	
Interlaken–Grindelwald	Bern	Alps	Grindelwald	1,034 m (3,392 ft)	12%	1,000 mm	Yes	Rail crossing	
Brünig	Bern/Obwalden	Alps	Brünig	1,002 m (3,287 ft)	12%	1,000 mm	Yes	Rail crossing	
Lucerne–Engelberg	Obwalden/Nidwalden	Alps	Engelberg	999 m (3,278 ft)	10.5%	1,000 mm	Yes	Dead-end rail	
St. Gallen–Gais–Altstätten	Appenzell A./St. Gallen	Alps	Hebrig	972 m (3,189 ft)		1,000 mm	Yes	Rail crossing	
St. Gallen–Trogen	Appenzell A./St. Gallen	Alps	Schützengarten	956 m (3,136 ft)	7.6%	1,000 mm	No	Dead-end rail	
**Spiez–Zweisimmen**	Bern	Alps	Zweisimmen	941 m (3,087 ft)	2.5%	1,435 mm	No	Rail crossing	
**Goldau–Pfäffikon**	Schwyz	Alps	Sattel Pass	932 m (3,058 ft)		1,435 mm	No	Rail crossing	
Gossau–Appenzell–Wasserauen	Appenzell A./Appenzell I./St. Gallen	Alps	Gonten	904 m (2,966 ft)	3.7%	1,000 mm	No	Dead-end rail	
**Martigny–Orsières**	Valais	Alps	Orsières	901 m (2,956 ft)	4%	1,435 mm	No	Dead-end rail	
**Zurich–Uetliberg**	Zurich	Albis	Uetliberg	813 m (2,667 ft)	7.9%	1,435 mm	No	Dead-end rail	
Rorschach-Heiden	Appenzell A./St. Gallen	Alps	Heiden	791 m (2,595 ft)	9%	1,435 mm	Yes	Dead-end rail	
Rheineck–Walzenhausen	Appenzell A./St. Gallen	Alps	Walzenhausen	672 m (2,205 ft)	25%	1,200 mm	Yes	Dead-end rail	
Dolderbahn	Zurich	Adlisberg	Dolder Grand	606 m (1,988 ft)	19.6%	1,000 mm	Yes	Dead-end rail	Opened as a funicular railway and converted to rack operation later
Centovalli	Ticino	Alps	Càmedo	549 m (1,801 ft)	6%	1,000 mm	No	Rail crossing	International line

== See also ==
- Rail transport in Switzerland
- List of heritage railways and funiculars in Switzerland
- List of highest paved roads in Switzerland
- List of mountains of Switzerland accessible by public transport
- Lists of tourist attractions in Switzerland
