= Furka Summit Tunnel =

Railway tunnel in southern Switzerland

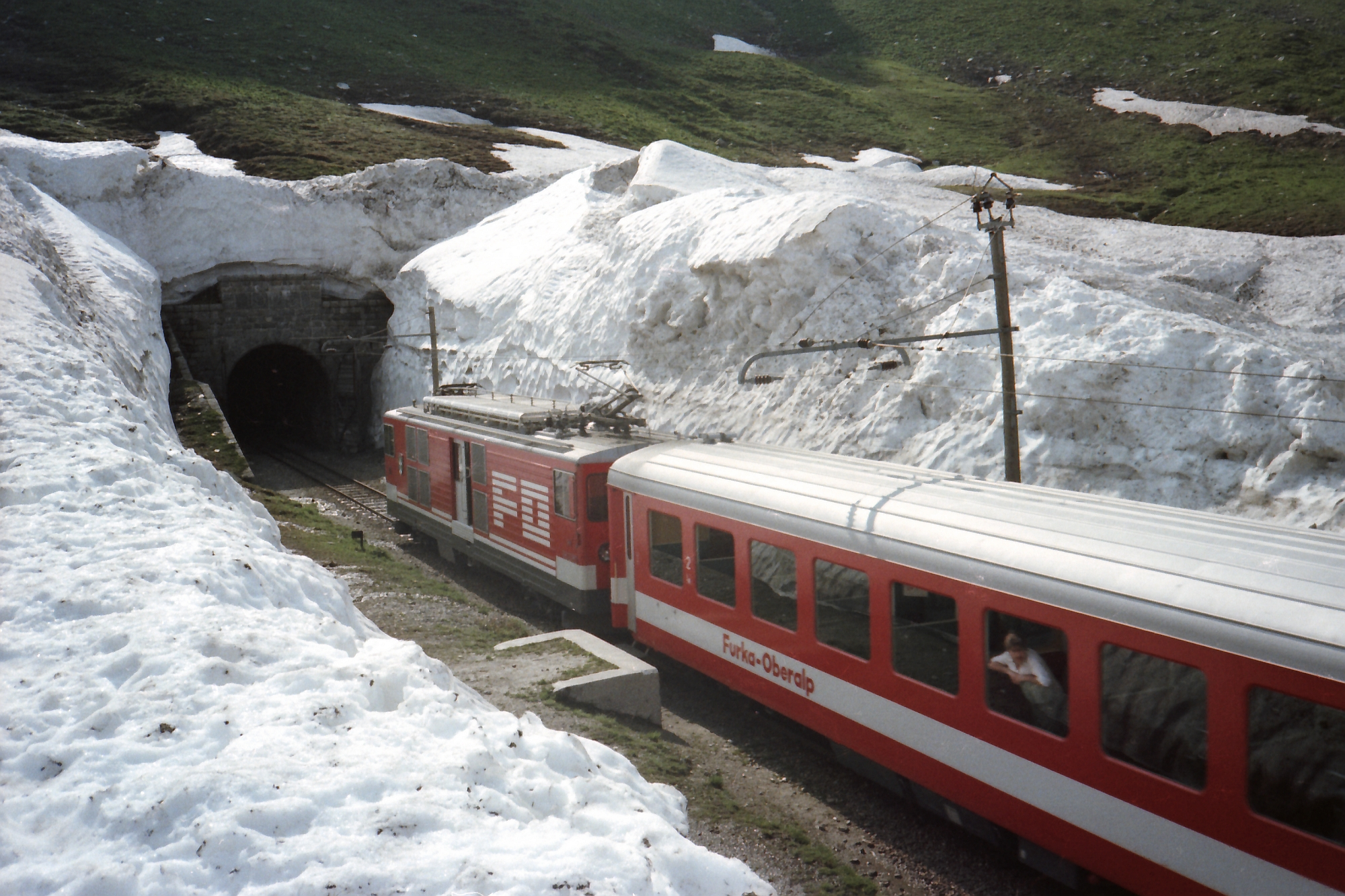
- FO train at Muttbach-Belvédère portal, 1981.
- Interactive map of Furka Summit Tunnel

Overview
- Line: Furka Oberalp Bahn (FO) (to 1981); Furka Cogwheel Steam Railway (DFB) (since 2000)
- Location: Valais / Uri, Switzerland
- Status: Open
- Start: Furka, Uri; 46°34′34″N 8°25′42″E
- End: Muttbach-Belvédère, Valais; 46°34′02″N 8°24′14″E

Operation
- Opened: 3 July 1926
- Closed: 11 October 1981
- Reopened: 14 July 2000
- Owner: Furka Cogwheel Steam Railway
- Operator: Furka Cogwheel Steam Railway
- Traffic: Train
- Character: Passenger

Technical
- Length: 1,858 m (1.155 mi)
- Line length: 1,858 m (1.155 mi)
- No. of tracks: Single track
- Track gauge: 1,000 mm (3 ft 3 3/8 in) metre gauge
- Electrified: Overhead catenary, 11 kV AC 16 2/3 Hz (1942-1981)
- Max elevation: 2,160 m (7,090 ft) above the Sea

The Furka Summit Tunnel (German: Furka-Scheiteltunnel) is a 1.86 kilometres (1.16 mi) long railway tunnel in southern Switzerland. It lies at an altitude of 2,160 metres (7,090 ft). The summit tunnel was completed in 1925, and first opened on 3 July 1926. It links the Furka railway station, in Uri, with the Muttbach-Belvédère halting point, in Valais.

Until 1982, when the summit tunnel was replaced by the Furka Base Tunnel, the railway line passing through the summit tunnel was part of the Furka Oberalp Bahn (FO). However, that line, which, along with the summit tunnel, was closed in 1981 and reopened in 2000, is now part of the Furka Cogwheel Steam Railway, a heritage railway operating in summer only.

== Furka Oberalp Bahn (FO) operations ==
Between 1926 and 1981, the FO allocated three schedule periods to the line passing through the summit tunnel. The summer schedule corresponded with the then European summer timetable. The other seasons, covered by the then European winter timetable, were divided by the FO into autumn and winter periods, because traffic over the Furka Pass could be operated only until mid October.

As soon as snow started falling, the FO had to be ready to place individual items of rolling stock on either side of the Furka, according to demand. Then, during the years commencing with electrification of the line in 1942, the electrical contact wire had to be dismantled over a nearly 15 kilometres (9.3 mi) long section of line, and the line made "avalanche ready". Everything more than 1 metre (3 ft 3 in) above ground level had to be removed, necessitating a huge annual expenditure.

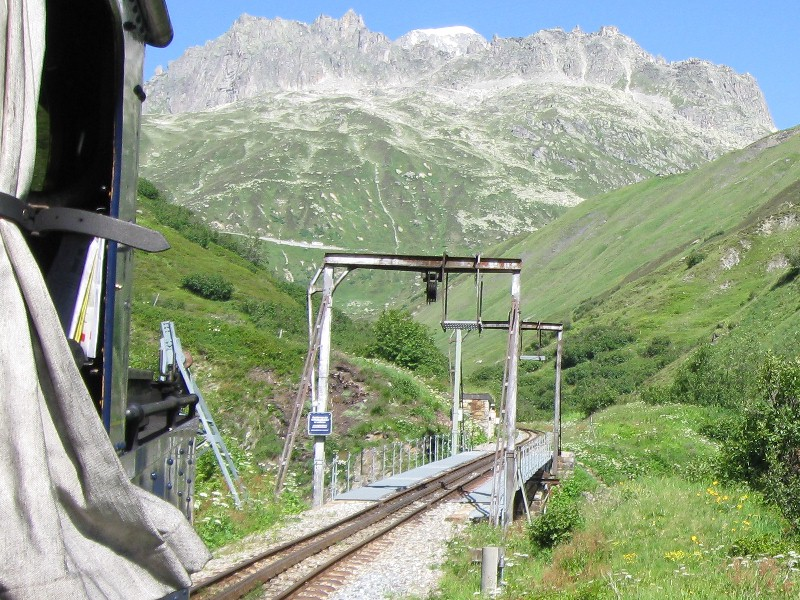
Steffenbach bridge viewed from a train going uphill.

The Steffenbach bridge, on the Uri side of the summit tunnel, was built initially as a viaduct. However, as early as the first year following its construction, it became the victim of an avalanche. A folding bridge was then installed in its place. To this day, the 30 tonne folding bridge, which can carry a payload of up to 200 tonnes (200 long tons; 220 short tons), is made safe each autumn by drawing it back to its abutments, in three pieces. Originally it took 20 men 8 hours to set it up or withdraw it but with the installation of hydraulic winches after the restoration of the railway it takes 10 men six hours.

Some early onsets of winter brought distress to the FO. On those occasions, staff members had to clear the track. For that work, steam locomotives of type HG 3/4 were used until 1968. They were then replaced with modern diesel electric locomotives of class HGm 4/4. In the years when winter came early, locomotives and railcars sometimes had to be loaded onto standard gauge vehicles, to be transported from either Göschenen or Chur to Brig or vice versa, on the side of the pass where they were needed.

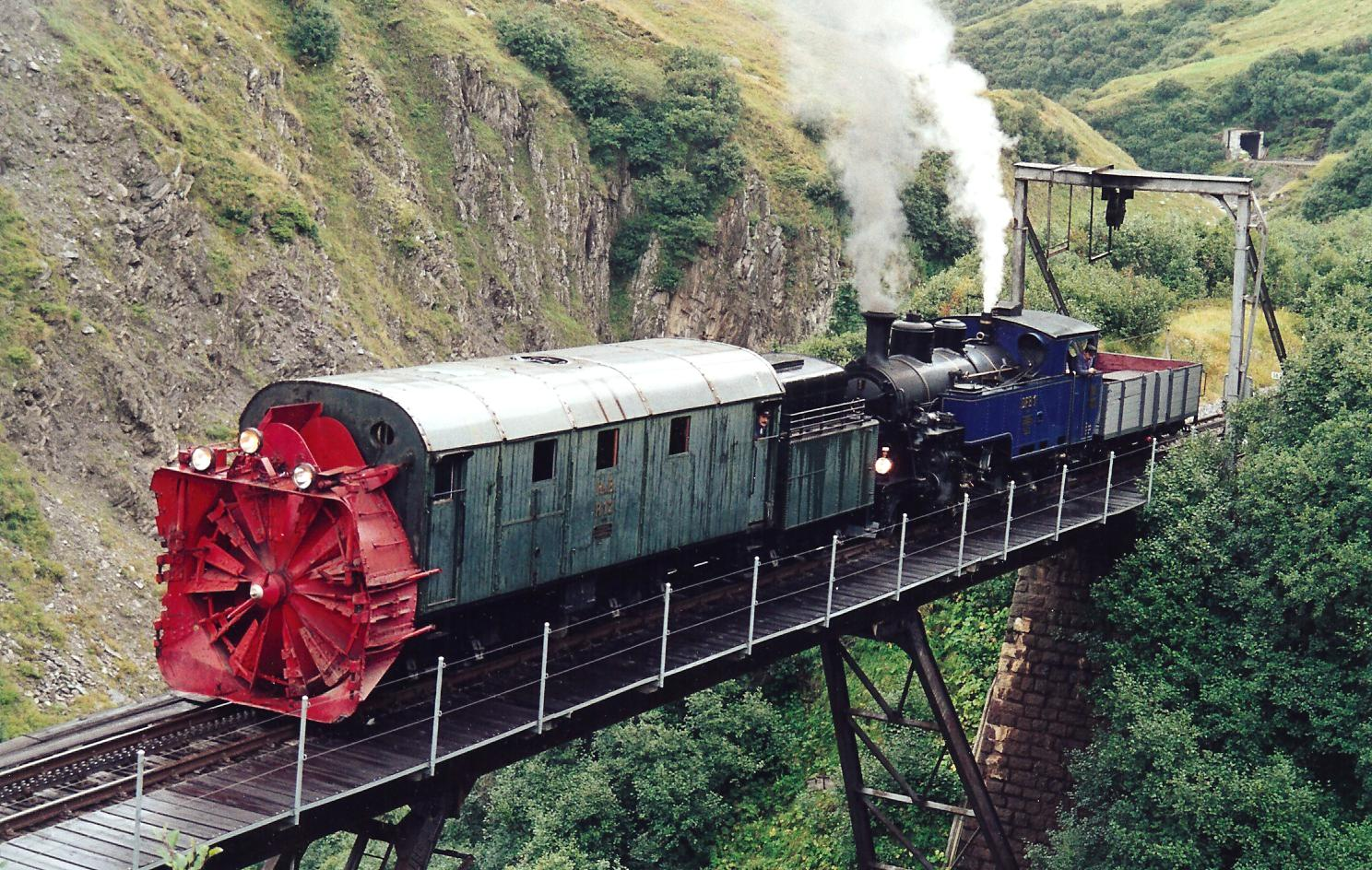
Rotary snow plough and steam locomotive on their way from Gletsch to Realp, crossing the Steffenbach bridge

At the start of June each year, the line could be reopened. Snow ploughs and blowers needed to be used for that purpose. On many occasions, the snow depths in the narrow alpine valleys were so great that the snow had to be removed by hand over many shifts, and with heavy construction equipment, until the FO's snow removal vehicles could be used. The construction equipment had to be transported on open rail wagons to the places where they were required. By these means, the line could be reopened two weeks earlier, but at a high price.

In 1963, the FO endured the most difficult of all its reopenings of the line. A team working with a steam locomotive on the snow front was hit and swept away by an avalanche. The incident cost several lives, including that of a journalist who had been along, which spurred the construction of the Furka Base Tunnel.

== Closure and reopening ==
In 1982, the original portion of the FO between Oberwald in Valais and Realp in Uri, including the summit tunnel, was replaced by an FO line passing through the then new Furka Base Tunnel. The superseded portion of the FO line was abandoned. However, strong public protests against the removal of the abandoned tracks led to the foundation 2 years later of the Furka Cogwheel Steam Railway (DFB), to preserve and operate the abandoned line.

Since 11 July 1992, the abandoned line has been progressively reopened from Realp, as a heritage railway operated by the DFB. On 14 July 2000, the DFB was extended from its then temporary terminus at Furka to Gletsch, via the Summit Tunnel, which was simultaneously reopened, and Muttbach-Belvédère.

== See also ==
- Furka railway station
- Muttbach-Belvédère halting point
- Furka Base Tunnel
- Furka Oberalp Bahn
- Furka Cogwheel Steam Railway
