= Oberwald railway station =

Railway station in Oberwald, Switzerland

Oberwald
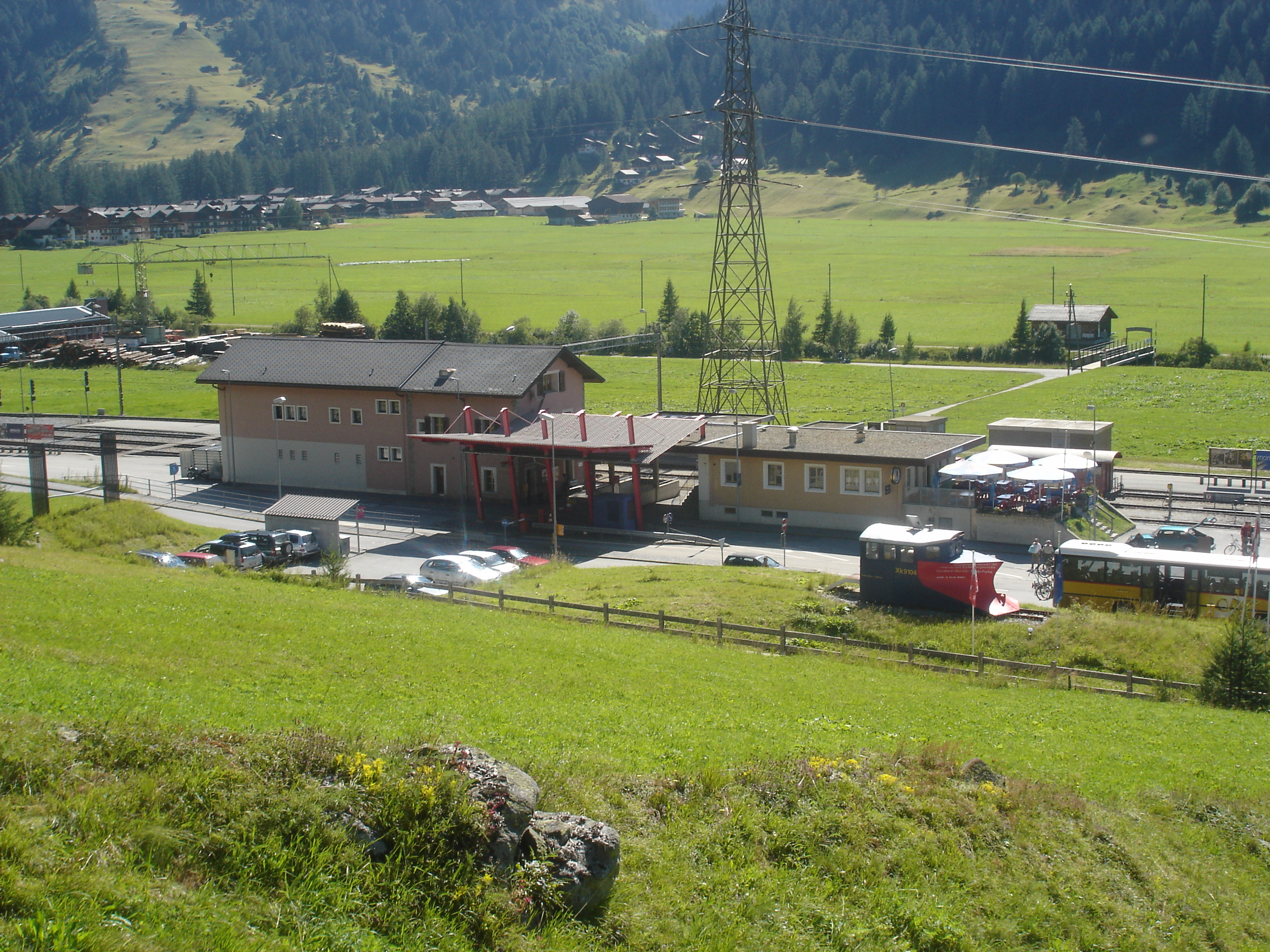
- The station in 2007

General information
- Location: Furkastrasse; Obergoms; Switzerland
- Coordinates: 46°31′51″N 8°20′35″E
- Elevation: 1,366 m (4,482 ft)
- Owner: Matterhorn Gotthard Bahn
- Lines: Furka Oberalp line; Furka Steam Railway
- Distance: 41.3 kilometres (25.7 mi) from Brig Bahnhofplatz; 17.838 kilometres (11.084 mi) from Realp DFB
- Platforms: 4
- Tracks: 6
- Train operators: Furka Steam Railway; Matterhorn Gotthard Bahn
- Connections: PostAuto AG buses

Construction
- Accessible: No

Other information
- Station code: 8501661 (OBW)

History
- Opened: 1 July 1914

Passengers
- 2023: 630 per weekday (MGB)

Services
Preceding station	Matterhorn Gotthard Bahn	Following station
Obergesteln towards Visp	R 43	Realp towards Andermatt
Terminus	Furka car shuttle train	Realp Terminus
Preceding station	Furka Steam Railway	Following station
Terminus	Oberwald to Realp	Gletsch towards Realp DFB
Location

Oberwald railway station is a railway station serving the village of Oberwald, in the Canton of Valais, Switzerland. The station is close to the western portal of the Furka Base Tunnel, on the metre gauge Furka Oberalp Bahn (FO), which connects Brig in Valais, via the base tunnel and Andermatt in Uri, with Göschenen, Uri, and Disentis/Mustér, Graubünden. Since 1 January 2003, the FO has been owned and operated by the Matterhorn Gotthard Bahn (MGB), following a merger between the FO and the Brig-Visp-Zermatt railway (BVZ).

At ceremony held on 12 August 2010, Oberwald station also became a station on the Furka Steam Railway (DFB), a heritage railway operating in summer over the FO section that was replaced by the Furka Base Tunnel in 1982. The portion of the DFB between Oberwald and Gletsch was formally reopened that day, following the driving of a gold spike at a ceremony on 18 June 2010 to mark the physical reconnection of that portion of the line. Scheduled DFB services commenced on 13 August 2010.

== Services ==
As of the December 2023 timetable change, the following services stop at Oberwald:

- Regio: hourly service between Visp and Andermatt.
- Frequent car shuttle trains through the Furka Base Tunnel between Oberwald and Realp.
- DFB heritage train services between Oberwald and Realp via the traditional mountain route operate only between June and October.

The long-distance Glacier Express passes through Oberwald without stopping; the Glacier Express ceased stopping at Oberwald in late 2014. Construction of the proposed Grimsel Tunnel would provide a fourth metre gauge railway link northwards under the Grimsel Pass towards Meiringen railway station.

== See also ==
- Glacier Express
- Car shuttle train
- Matterhorn Gotthard Bahn
- Furka Base Tunnel
- Furka Oberalp Bahn
- Furka Steam Railway
