= Furka Steam Railway =

Heritage railway line in Switzerland

Coordinates: 46°33′41″N 8°21′43″E

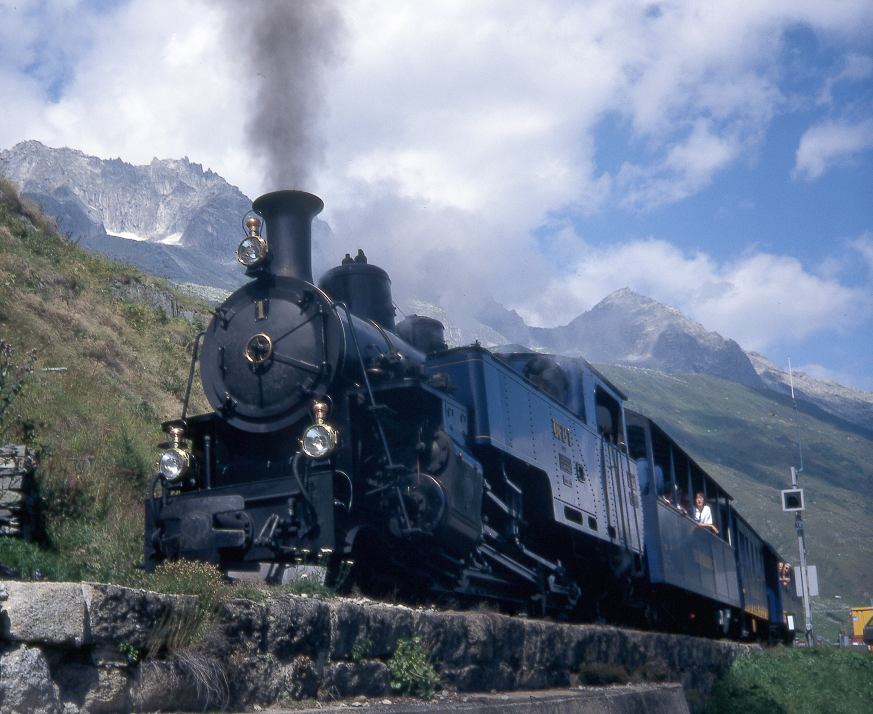
- The Furka Steam Railway

Overview
- Native name: Dampfbahn Furka-Bergstrecke DFB
- Status: Operating during summer and autumn season
- Owner: Verein Furka-Bergstrecke
- Locale: Uri / Valais, Switzerland
- Termini: Realp; Oberwald
- Stations: 6
- Website: Furka Steam Railway

Service
- Type: Heavy rail
- Services: 1
- Operator: Verein Furka-Bergstrecke
- Depot: Realp

History
- Opened: 1925
- Closed: 1981
- Reopened: 1992

Technical
- Line length: 17.838 km (11.084 mi)
- Character: Heritage railway
- Rack system: Abt
- Track gauge: 1,000 mm (3 ft 3 3/8 in) metre gauge
- Highest elevation: 2,160 m (7,090 ft)
- Maximum incline: 3.5% (adhesion); 11.8% (rack rail)

The Furka Steam Railway (German: Dampfbahn Furka-Bergstrecke (DFB)) is a largely volunteer-operated heritage railway which operates a partially rack and pinion-operated line across the Furka Pass, between Realp in Uri and Oberwald in Valais. Culminating at 2,160 metres (7,087 ft), above sea level, it is an old mountainous section of the Furka Oberalp Bahn (FO) that was abandoned after the construction of the Furka Tunnel. It has been gradually brought back into service by the Verein Furka-Bergstrecke with the use of only steam locomotives, with the entire line completed in 2010. As a result, the nearly 18 kilometre-long Furka Railway is the longest operated unelectrified line in Switzerland. It is also the second highest rail crossing in Europe, after the Bernina Railway. The Uri side of the line also constitutes the highest railway in Central Switzerland.

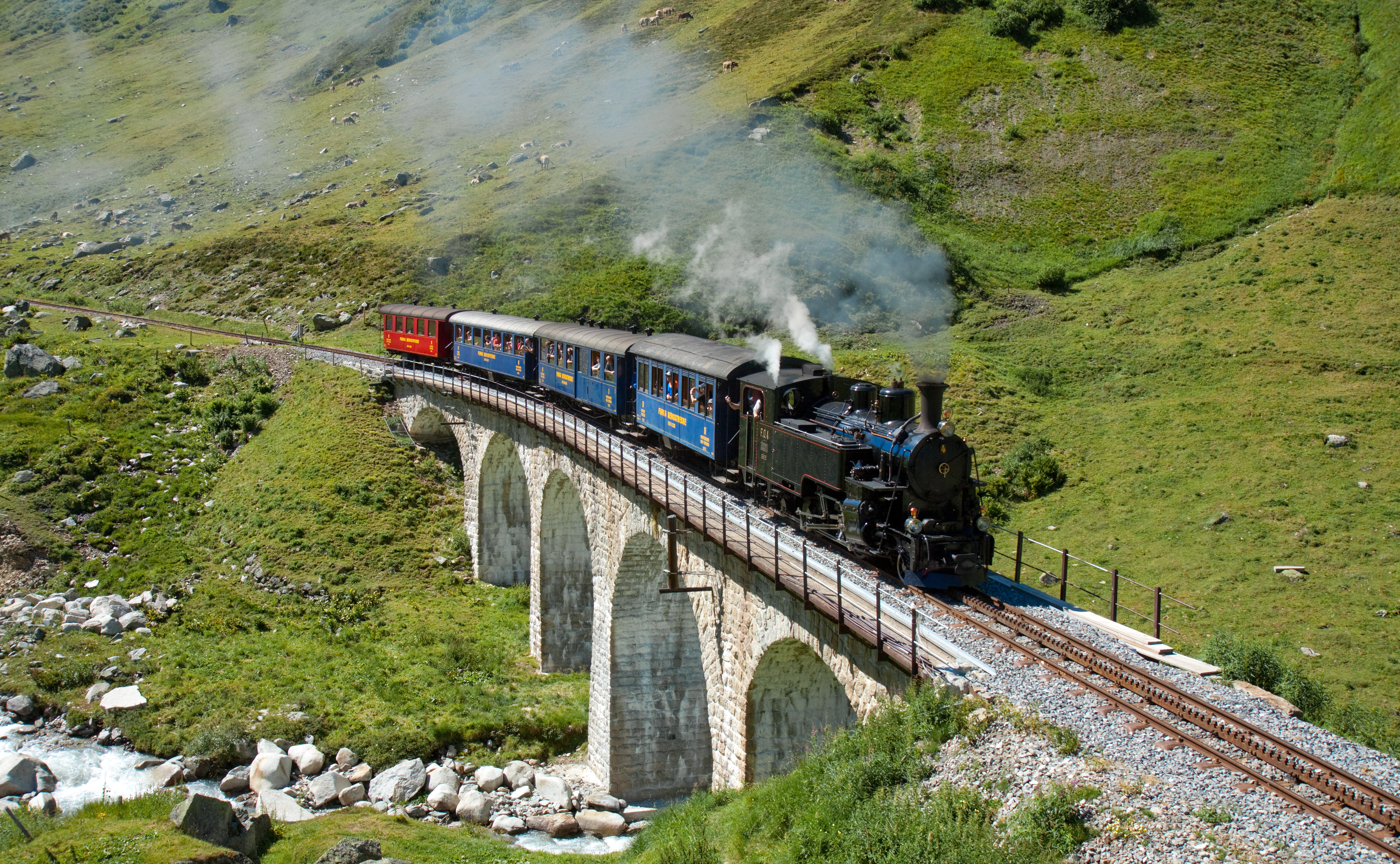
At the Steinstafel bridge

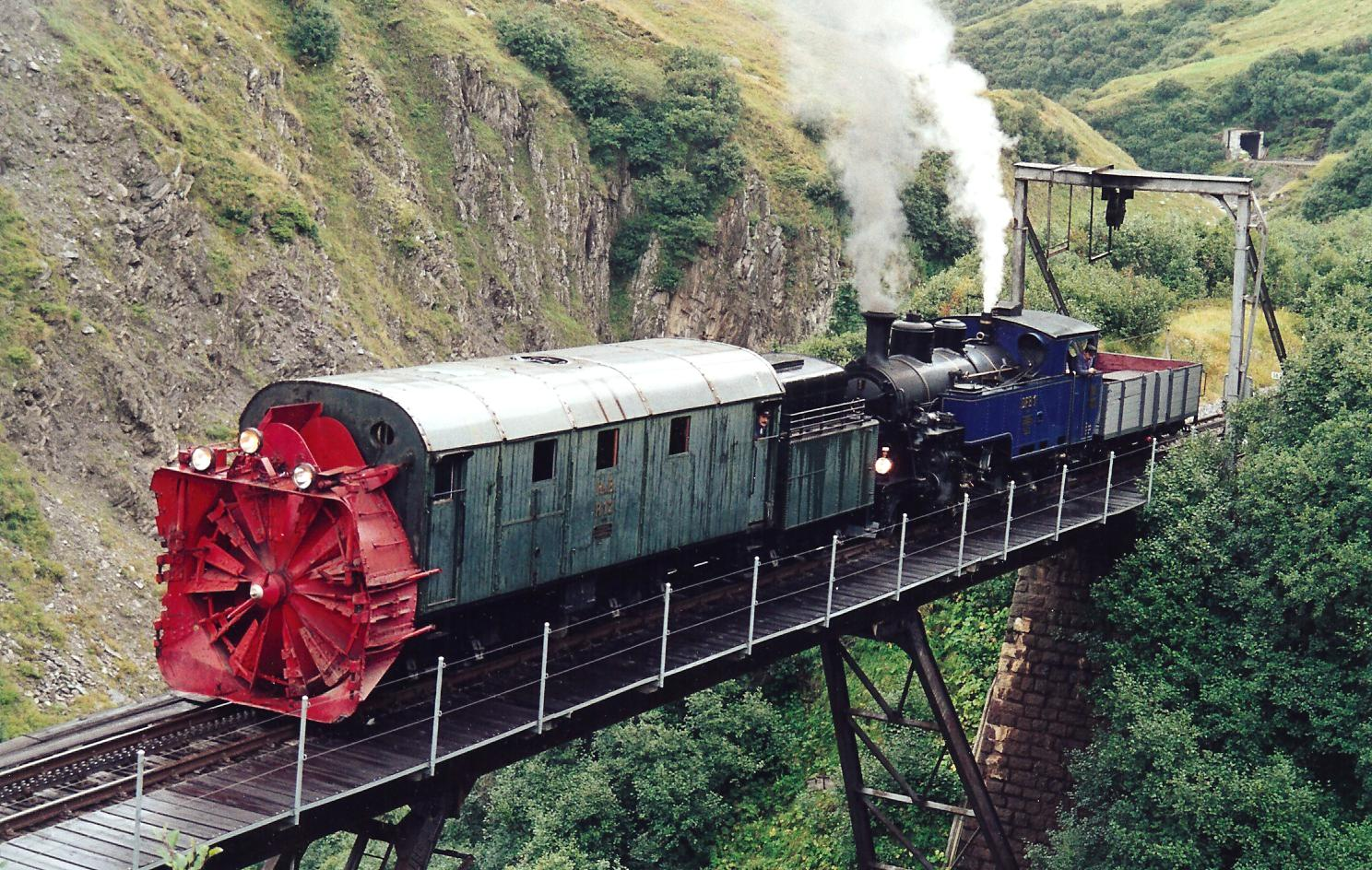
Rotary snowplough at the Steffenbach bridge

The section of line was always a severe operational difficulty for the FO as its high altitude rendered it impassable due to snow and ice for much of the winter season, hence its being abandoned and a tunnel constructed. This has remained a headache for the DFB, as every year it must be closed down and then reopened, an expensive process which involves the removal and replacement of a specially folding transportable bridge that would otherwise be damaged by the snow every year.

The rebuilding of the line has also not been without new difficulties. Requiring to cross a busy main road on a rack operated section, the rack over the road is retractable, actuated to raise at the same time as the level crossing barriers by radios fitted to the line's locomotives. Another section, running through a forested nature reserve, has had to be fitted with a sprinkler system that operates before and after trains pass, again actuated by the radios aboard. Relays allow the system to cascade up or down the section in line with the train, to save water which is supplied by natural water supplies near the summit of the line.

== Current and future plans ==
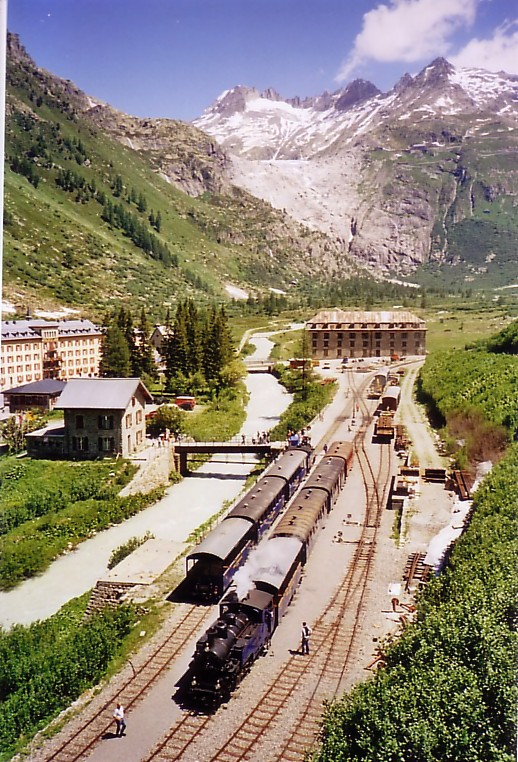
Gletsch railway station

The organisation has restored 2 HG 4/4 "D" Steam Locomotives. These 0-8-0 locos were built in Switzerland for use in Vietnam, and were repatriated along with locomotives from the Furka Oberalp Bahn that had been exported to Vietnam after their use in Switzerland. The organisation raised approximately Swiss Fr. 1,700,000 for the work required. The cost of a new firebox, one of the components the HG 4/4s require, is about Swiss Fr. 110,000. The first restored locomotive, 704, was handed over in June 2018, with the second, 708, being commissioned in June 2023.

Another successful project was the restoration of a steam-powered rotary snowplough to deal with the heavy snowfall that needs to be cleared from the route before services can commence each year.

The fundraising foundation Stiftung Furka - Bergstrecke (Furka Mountain Line Foundation), which is separate to the operating company, was providing for the reconstruction of the 2 HG 4/4 locomotives and now provides to maintain the infrastructure of the line.

There are videos on YouTube of the line running, with the snowplough.

== See also ==
- List of heritage railways and funiculars in Switzerland
- List of mountain railways in Switzerland
