= Göschenen railway station =

Railway station in Göschenen, Switzerland

Göschenen
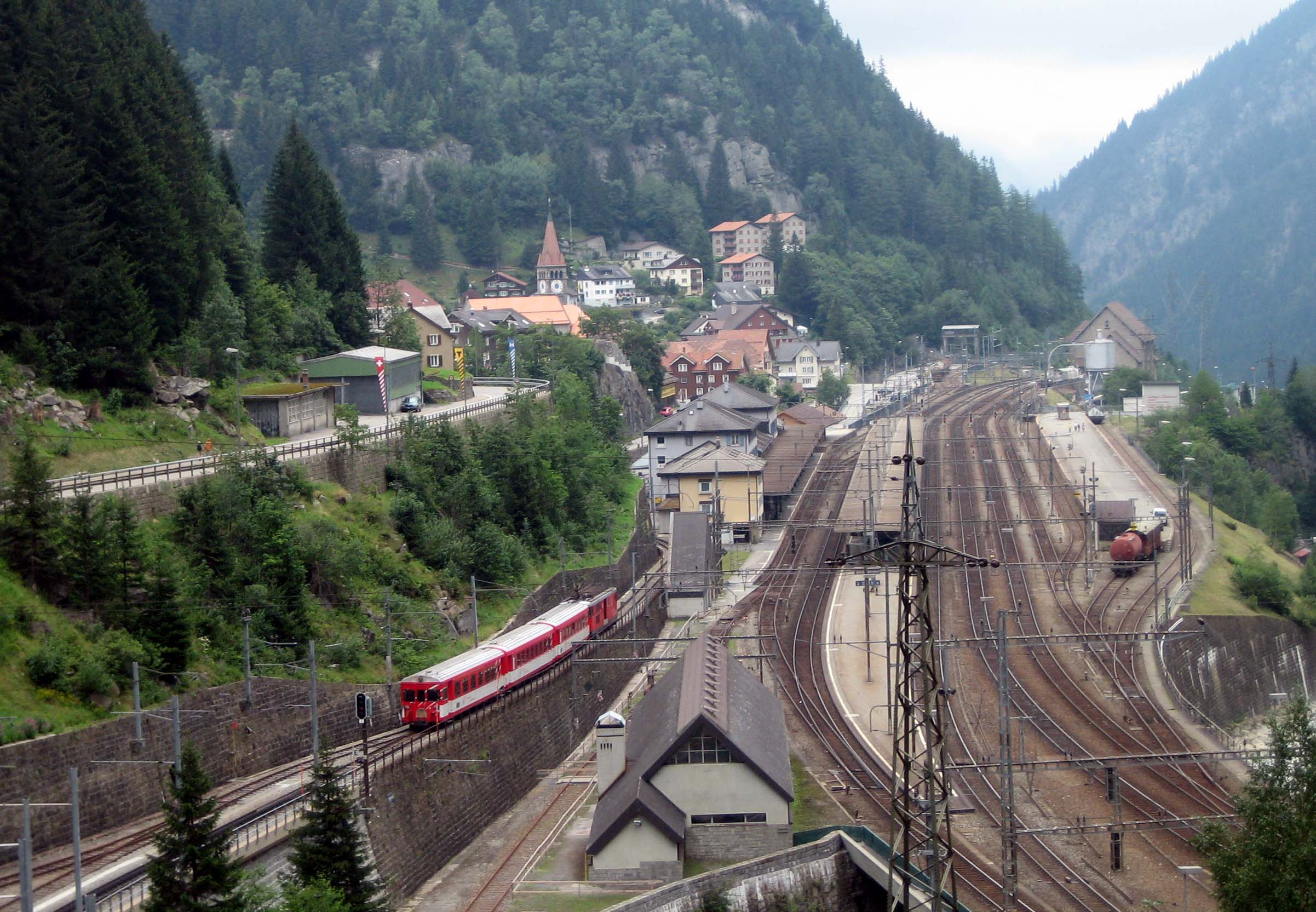
- Göschenen station with MGB train at centre left and Swiss Federal Railways tracks at centre right.

General information
- Location: Bahnhofplatz 1 Göschenen; Switzerland
- Coordinates: 46°39′57″N 8°35′20″E
- Elevation: 1,106 m (3,629 ft)
- Owner: Swiss Federal Railways
- Lines: Gotthard line; Schöllenenbahn
- Distance: 70.5 km (43.8 mi) from Immensee; 3.75 km (2.33 mi) from Andermatt
- Train operators: Matterhorn Gotthard Bahn; Südostbahn
- Connections: Auto AG Uri and PostAuto Schweiz bus lines

History
- Opened: 1 June 1882
- Electrified: 18 October 1920

Passengers
- 2018: 1,600 per weekday

Services
| Preceding station | Südostbahn | Following station |
|---|---|---|
| Erstfeld towards Basel SBB | IR 26 | Airolo towards Locarno |
| Erstfeld towards Zürich HB | IR 46 | Airolo towards Locarno |
| Preceding station | Matterhorn Gotthard Bahn | Following station |
| Andermatt towards Realp | R 44 | Terminus |
Location

Göschenen railway station is a railway station in the Swiss canton of Uri and municipality of Göschenen. Situated on the original line of the Gotthard railway, at the northern mouth of the Gotthard Tunnel, the station is also the junction point with the Schöllenenbahn. Most trains on the Gotthard route now use the Gotthard Base Tunnel and do not pass through Göschenen station.

The Gotthard railway connects Göschenen via Immensee with Zürich in the north, and via the Gotthard Rail Tunnel and Chiasso with Milan in the south. The importance of the line decreased in the 2010s with the opening of the Gotthard Base Tunnel (2016) and Ceneri Base Tunnel (2020), creating a new fast route between Central Switzerland and Ticino. Südostbahn now runs hourly InterRegio service over the route.

The Schöllenenbahn, a very short metre gauge branch line, operates between Göschenen and Andermatt, just 3.75 kilometres (2.33 mi) to the south. It is operated by the Matterhorn Gotthard Bahn (MGB), and connects the Gotthard railway with southern Switzerland's metre gauge railway network.

== Services ==
As of the December 2020 timetable change, the following services stop at Göschenen:

- InterRegio: hourly service between Locarno and Arth-Goldau; trains continue to Basel SBB or Zürich Hauptbahnhof.
- Regio: two trains per hour to Andermatt.
- Gotthard Panorama Express: daily tourist oriented service between Lugano and Arth-Goldau, with connecting boat service on Lake Lucerne to Lucerne.
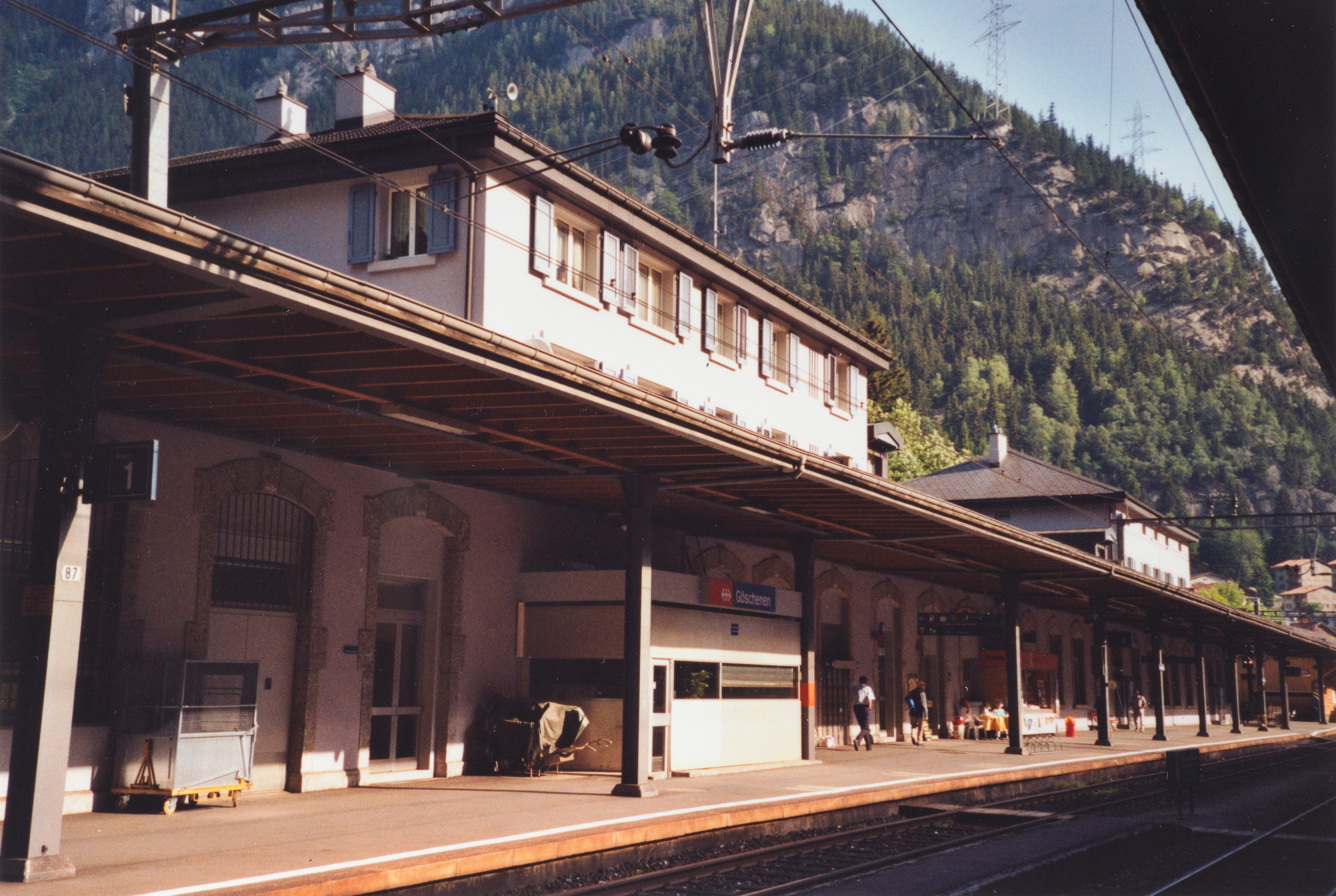
station building (2003)

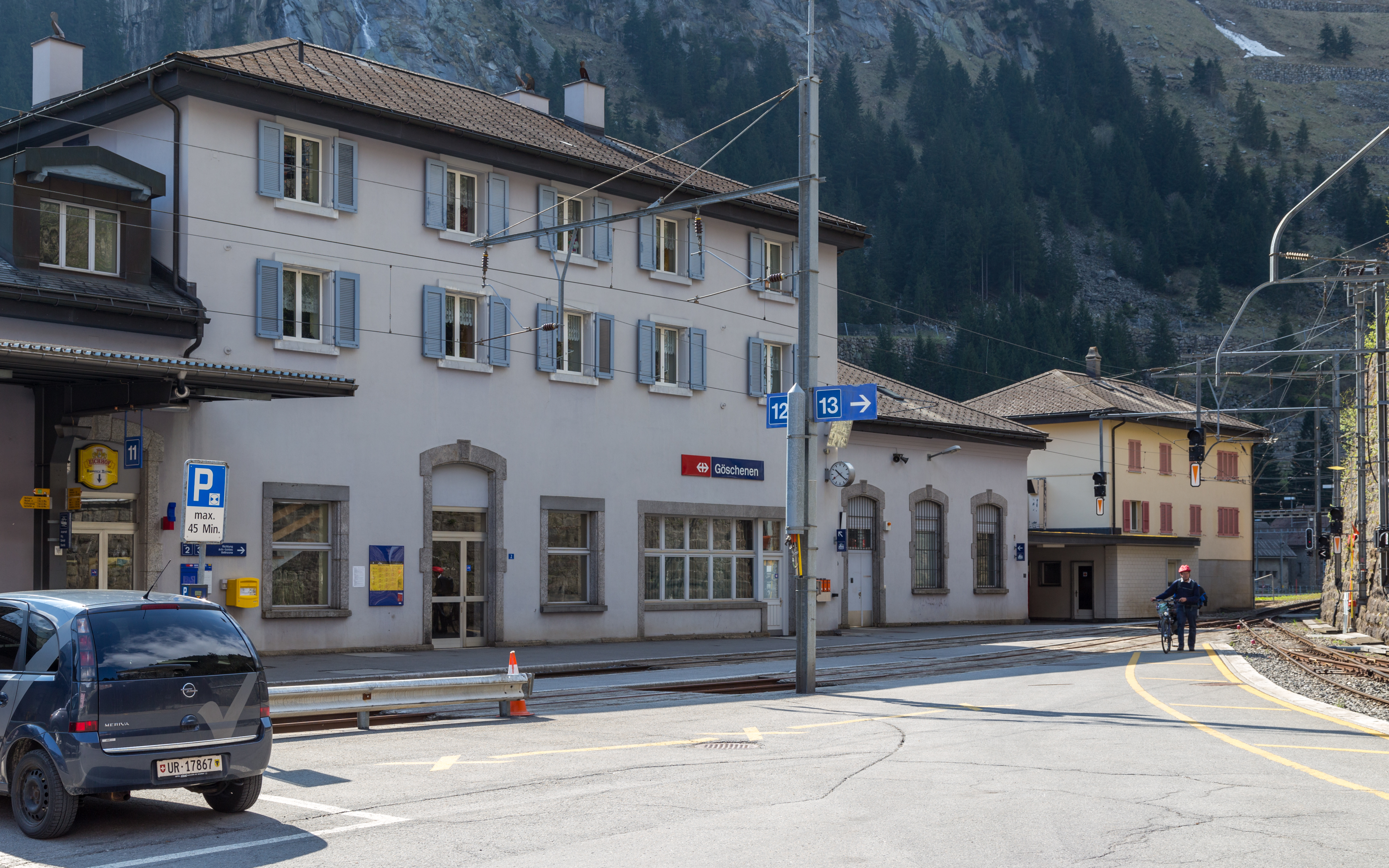
station square with tracks of Schöllenenbahn (2014)

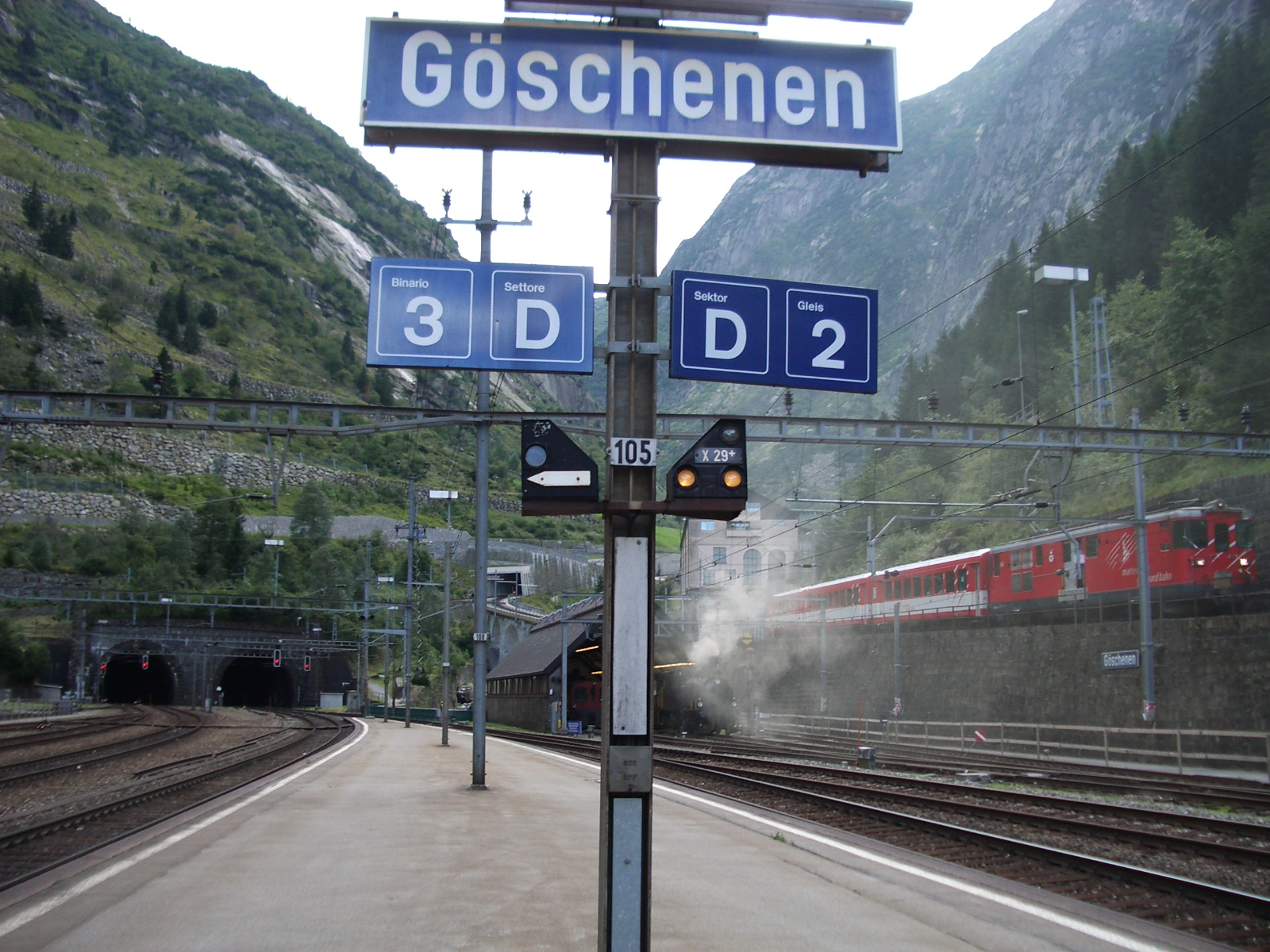
Gotthard tunnel portal north of the station (2007)

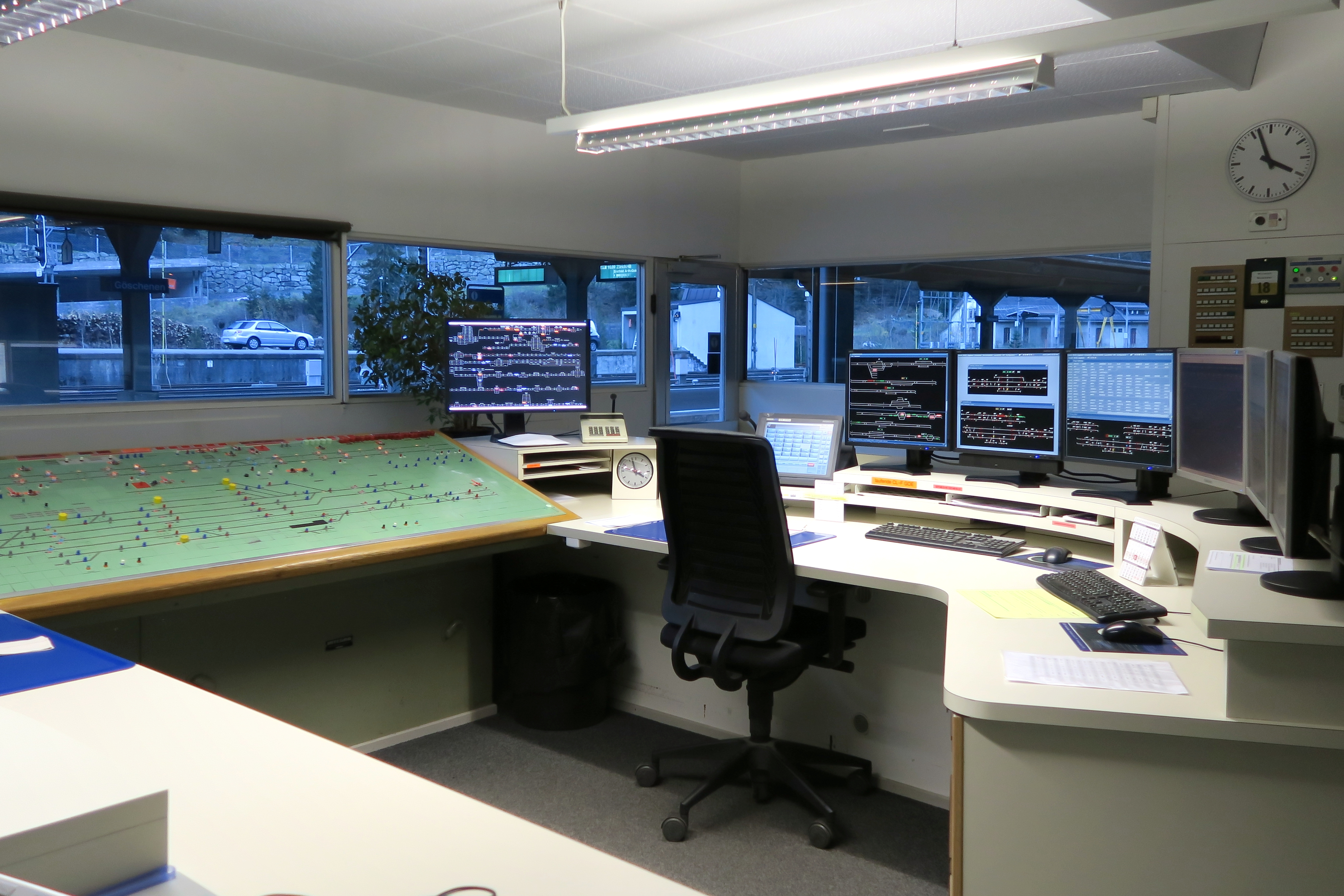
Gotthard tunnel signal box (2015) in use until 2021

== See also ==
- Rail transport in Switzerland
