= Furka Base Tunnel =

Railway tunnel in central Switzerland

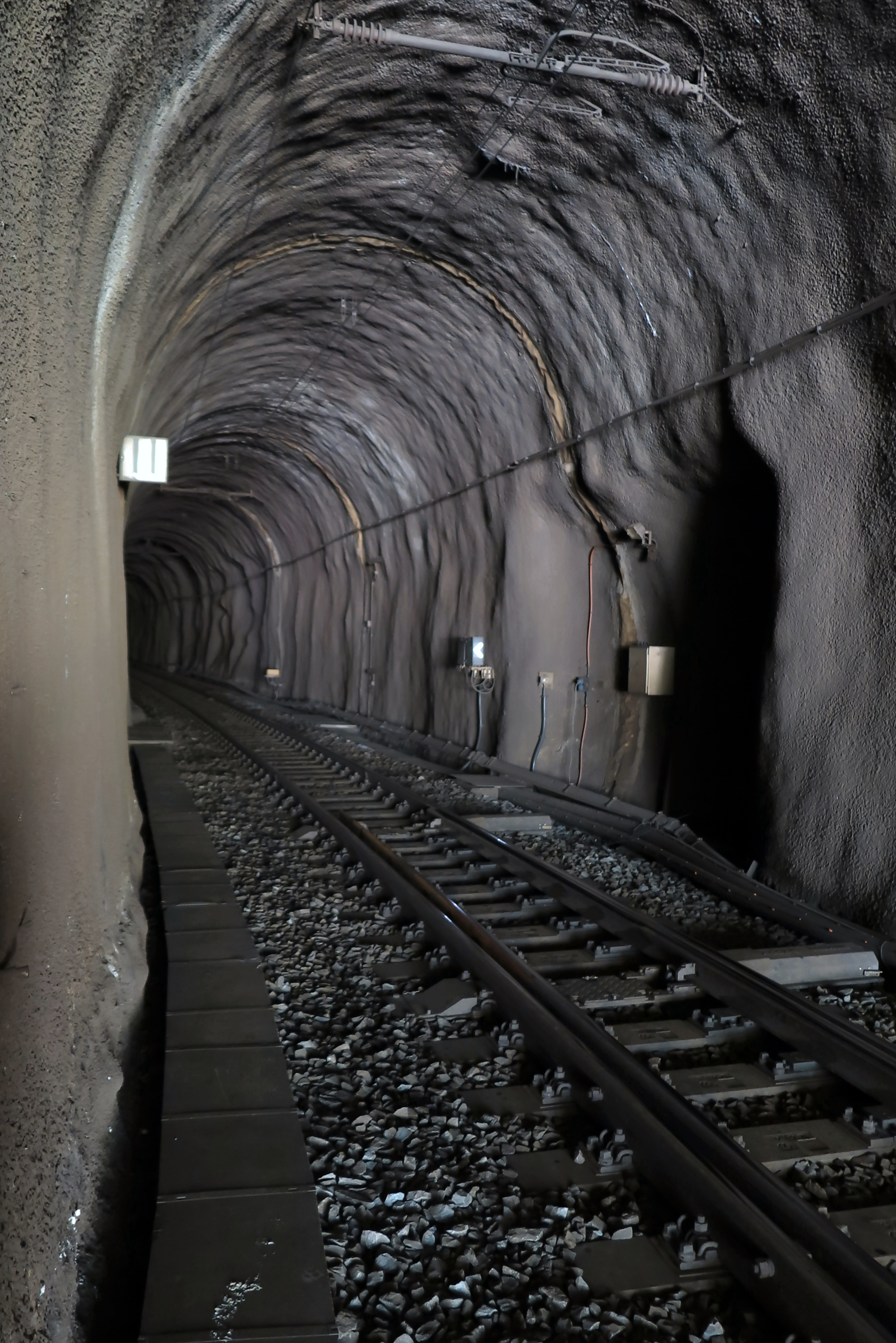
- Tunnel near the Realp portal

Overview
- Line: Furka Oberalp Bahn
- Location: Valais / Uri, Switzerland
- Coordinates: 46°32′7″N 8°27′12″E
- Status: Open
- System: Matterhorn Gotthard Bahn
- Start: Oberwald, Valais, Switzerland
- End: Realp, Uri, Switzerland

Operation
- Opened: 25 June 1982
- Owner: Matterhorn Gotthard Bahn
- Operator: Matterhorn Gotthard Bahn
- Traffic: Train
- Character: Passenger and freight

Technical
- Length: 15.407 km (9.573 mi)
- Line length: 15.407 km (9.573 mi)
- No. of tracks: Single track
- Track gauge: 1,000 mm (3 ft 3 3/8 in) metre gauge
- Electrified: Overhead catenary, 11 kV AC 16 2/3 Hz
- Max elevation: 1,564 m (5,131 ft) above the Sea
- Min elevation: 1,390 m (4,560 ft)

The Furka Base Tunnel is a Swiss railway base tunnel on the Matterhorn Gotthard Bahn's Furka–Oberalp line, an east–west railway connecting the cantons of Valais and Uri. Its west portal lies east of Oberwald (VS), at 1,390 m (4,560 ft) above sea level and its east portal lies south of Realp (UR), at 1,550 m (5,090 ft).

Prior to its construction, all traffic had to use the historic high-level route via the 1.8 km (1.1 mi) long Furka Summit Tunnel, which was only available seasonally due to the threat posed by heavy snowfalls. Construction commenced during 1971, taking ten years to complete. An innovative permanent support system was used, comprising rock anchors and a shotcrete coating, which included the first use of polyurethane-based grouting within a railway tunnel. The tunnel has a relatively narrow cross section, which has been attributed with slowing the construction effort somewhat. The interconnecting Bedretto tunnel was used during the Furka Base Tunnel's construction for the removal of excavating spoil as well as to moving supplies inwards; it has since been reused for ventilation.

The Furka Base Tunnel is 15,407 m (16,849 yd) in length, and replaced the previous track that climbed to an apex of 2,160 m (7,090 ft) above sea level, thus allowing year-round through service on the Furka–Oberalp line. In the middle of the base tunnel, is a 5,221-metre-long (5,710 yd) access tunnel to Bedretto in the canton of Ticino (elevation 1,480 m (4,860 ft)); some proponents of the project hoped to eventually build a Y-shaped tunnel connecting all three locations. The Furka Base Tunnel is completed by a bypass tunnel around Oberwald.

== History ==
=== Background ===
Prior to the opening of the Furka Base Tunnel, all railway traffic on the Furka–Oberalp line traversed the challenging terrain between Valais and Uri via the historic high-level route using the 1.8 km (1.1 mi) long Furka Summit Tunnel. This section of the line was particularly challenging to operate, its closure being necessary during the winter months due to the risks associated with heavy snowfalls. These seasonal cycles of closures and reopenings required civil engineering works each time, as large sections of the railway's overhead electrical lines had to be dismantled and reinstated as well.

The replacement of the Furka Summit Tunnel with a base tunnel had long been identified as an attractive solution, but the prospects for constructing such a tunnel were complicated by multiple factors in both its design and construction. Initial authorisation from the Federal Council for preparatory work was given in 1971. During 1976, the Parliament of Switzerland passed a comprehensive bill for the base tunnel's construction, sponsored by Roger Bonvin; the total cost of its construction had been initially estimated to be 76 million francs. However, these estimates proved to be drastically inadequate as the project proceeded, with figures in excess of 300 million francs being reached prior to the base tunnel's completion. There was substantial political tensions surrounding these cost overruns, which have been said to have contributed to Bonvin's ill health toward the end of the project; Bonvin died just prior to its opening in 1982. A plaque commemorating Roger Bonvin is installed as the base tunnel's entrance in Oberwald.

=== Construction ===
During 1971, work commenced on the boring of the Bedretto tunnel, which functioned as an annex tunnel for the Furka Base Tunnel. Excavated by conventional techniques, including both drilling and blasting, it was a relatively narrow tunnel through the bare rock. It was used during the Furka Base Tunnel's construction for the removal of excavating spoil as well as to convey supplies into the construction site. The Bedretto tunnel was abandoned for a time following the completion of the Furka tunnel, being used neither for emergency access nor for maintenance purposes, in part due to three separate collapses. During the 2010s, it was restored to accommodate a new ventilation system for the Furka tunnel, intended to supply fresh air in the event of a major fire within the latter tunnel.

The construction techniques used for the Furka Base Tunnel were relatively innovative for the era. One such technique involved the application of a recently developed polyurethane-based grouting to make the rock surrounding the tunnel portals impermeable. It was reportedly the first use of such material within a railway tunnel. The permanent support for the tunnel consisted only of rock anchors and a shotcrete lining along the majority of its length. Areas of particularly high rock pressure were addressed via the excavation of an elliptical or circular profile and the application of steel ribs. Engineers were guided in the use of support measures by a series of geological studies, along with construction experience, to predict and monitor systematic deformation.

In spite of the presence of multiple complex geological features along the bore, work typically proceeded at a steady pace. Typically 400 metres of the tunnel were lined each month, this rate being supported via five individual shotcrete machines that were operated simultaneously. By the end of its construction, roughly 70,000 m^{3} of dry aggregate and cement mixture had been used, while 115,000 rock bolts have been applied.

The completed Furka Base Tunnel accommodates a single track throughout, its cross section varying between 26 and 42 m^{2} throughout its length. This often narrow cross section has been attributed as one reason for the tunnel's construction requiring ten years, as it hindered the movement of bulky construction equipment.

== Service life ==
During 1982, the Furka Base Tunnel was opened to traffic. During its initial year of operation, the tunnel was used to transport in excess of 75,000 passenger cars, trucks and buses. As of 2009, the base tunnel serves both an hourly regional train and ten daily Glacier Express trains between Zermatt and the ski resort town of St. Moritz. During the winter skiing season, traffic in the tunnel has consistently approached its maximum capacity.

While the older high level route was initially closed following the diversion of all regular services through the new Furka Base Tunnel, this line has since been reopened by the Furka Heritage Railway, which routinely put on tourist trains through the historic Furka Pass, including the Furka Summit Tunnel.

During August 2018, a comprehensive modernisation of the Furka Base Tunnel's infrastructure commenced. This programme, costed at CHF 190 million, largely revolves around the refurbishment of the tunnel's structure, the wholesale replacement of the track and trackbed, as well as the incorporation of various safety measures. The tunnel is typically kept operational throughout the process by performing the majority of the work at night. Particular attention has been paid to the tunnel ventilation, intended to control threats such as fires. However, the study of several operational scenarios points out the weaknesses of the existing ventilation system and difficulties to dissipate the smokes without modifying the ventilation system.

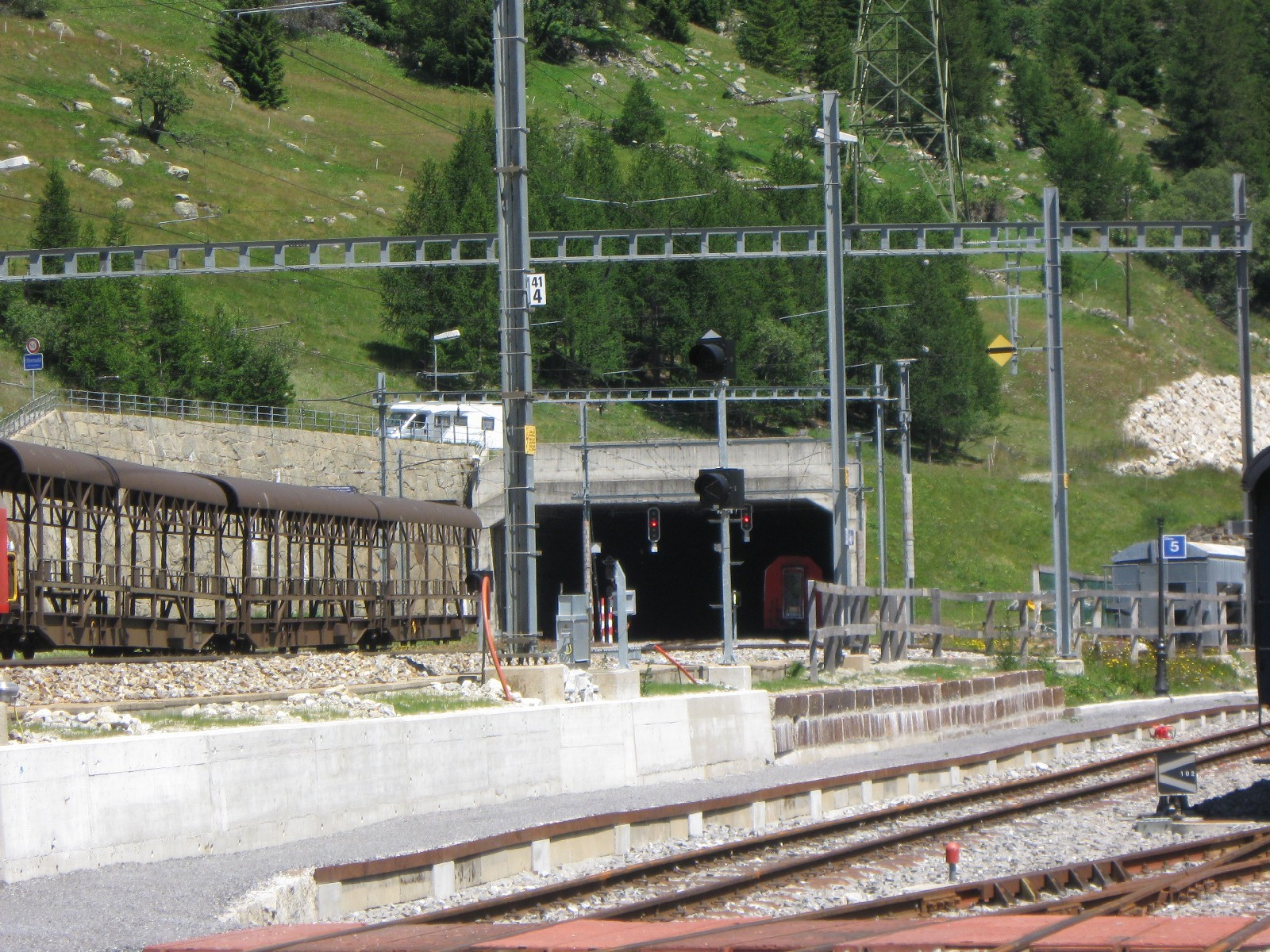
Oberwald bypass tunnel (1366 m a.s.l.)

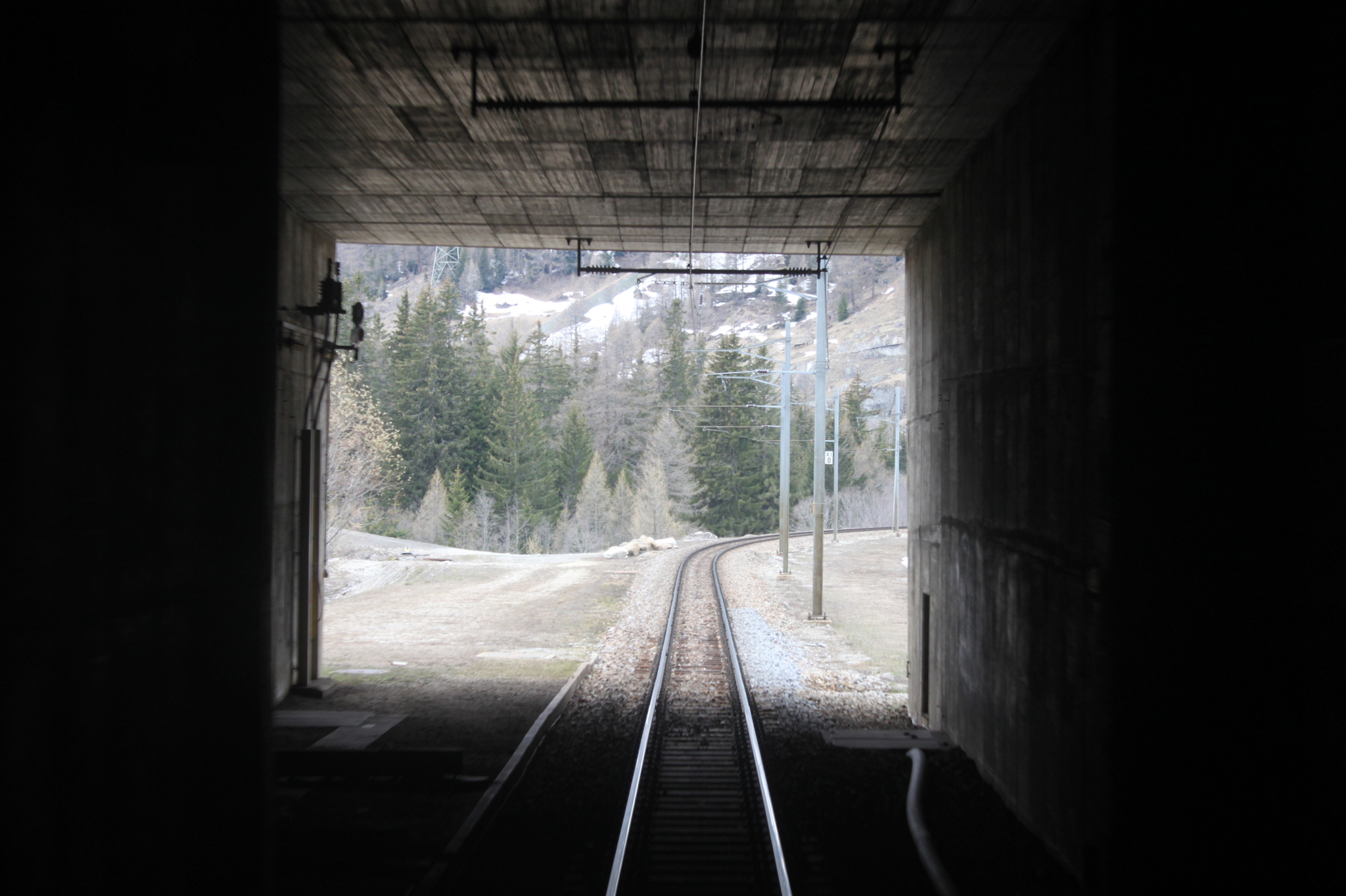
West portal (1390 m a.s.l.)

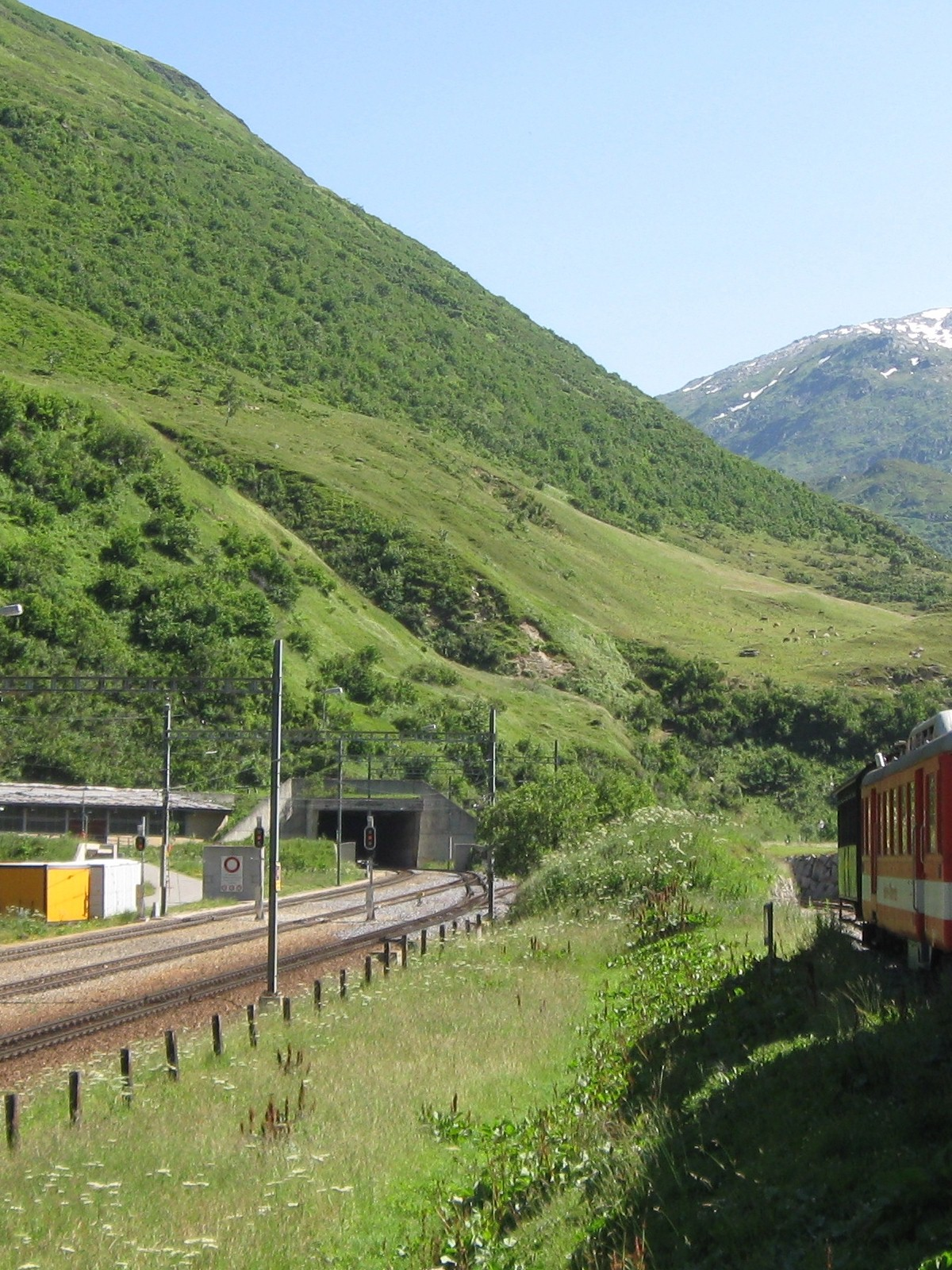
East portal (1550 m a.s.l.)

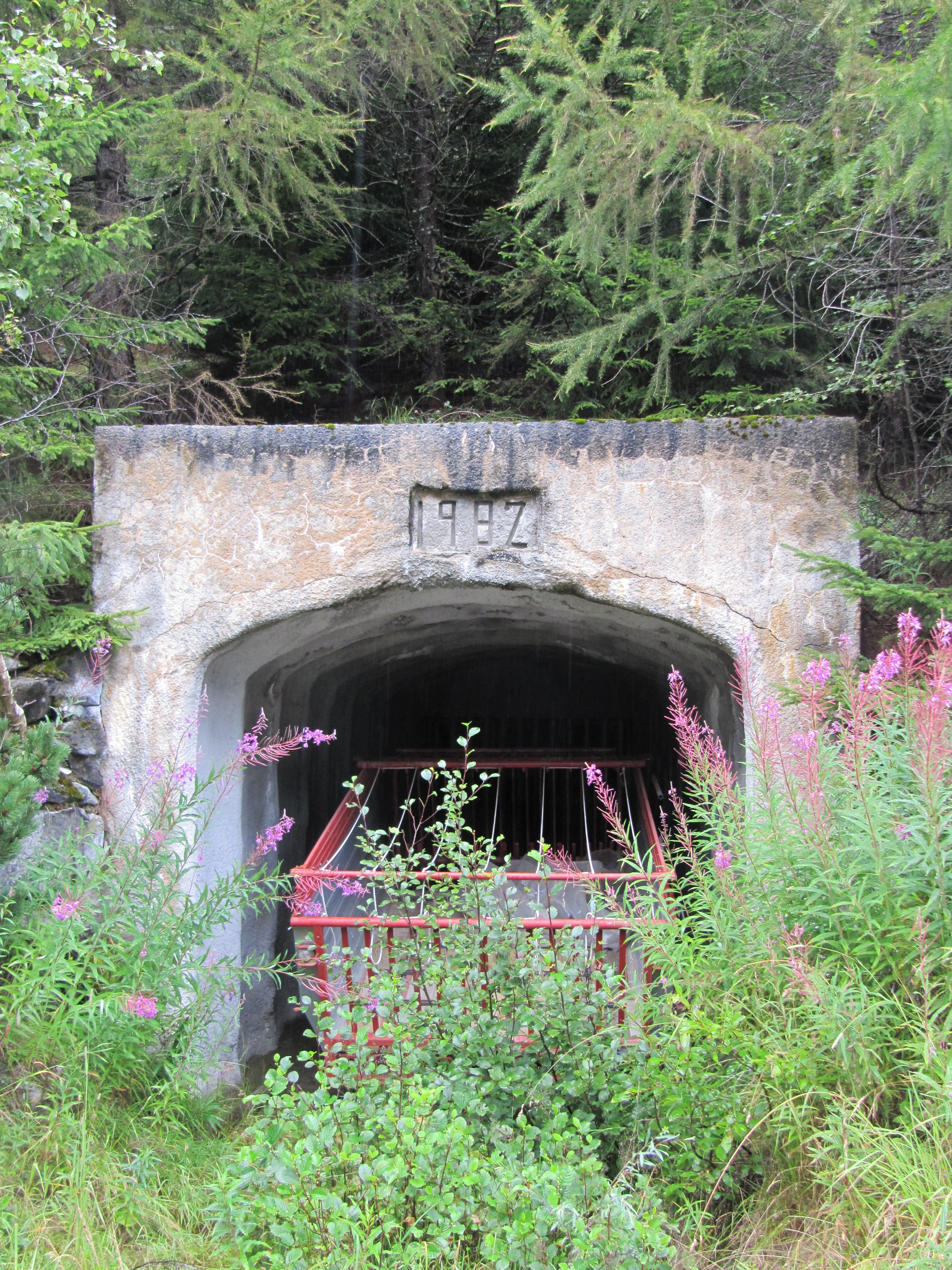
Bedretto window (1480 m a.s.l.)

== See also ==
- Bedretto Underground Laboratory for Geoenergies
- Rotondo Granite
