= Furka Oberalp Railway =

Railway line in Switzerland

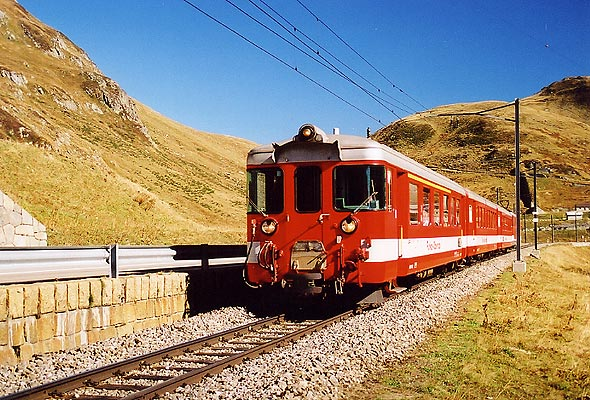
- A train on the Oberalp Pass

Overview
- Native name: Furka Oberalp Bahn

Technical
- Rack system: Abt
- Track gauge: 1,000 mm (3 ft 3 3/8 in) metre gauge
- Electrification: 11,000 V 16.7 Hz AC
Route map
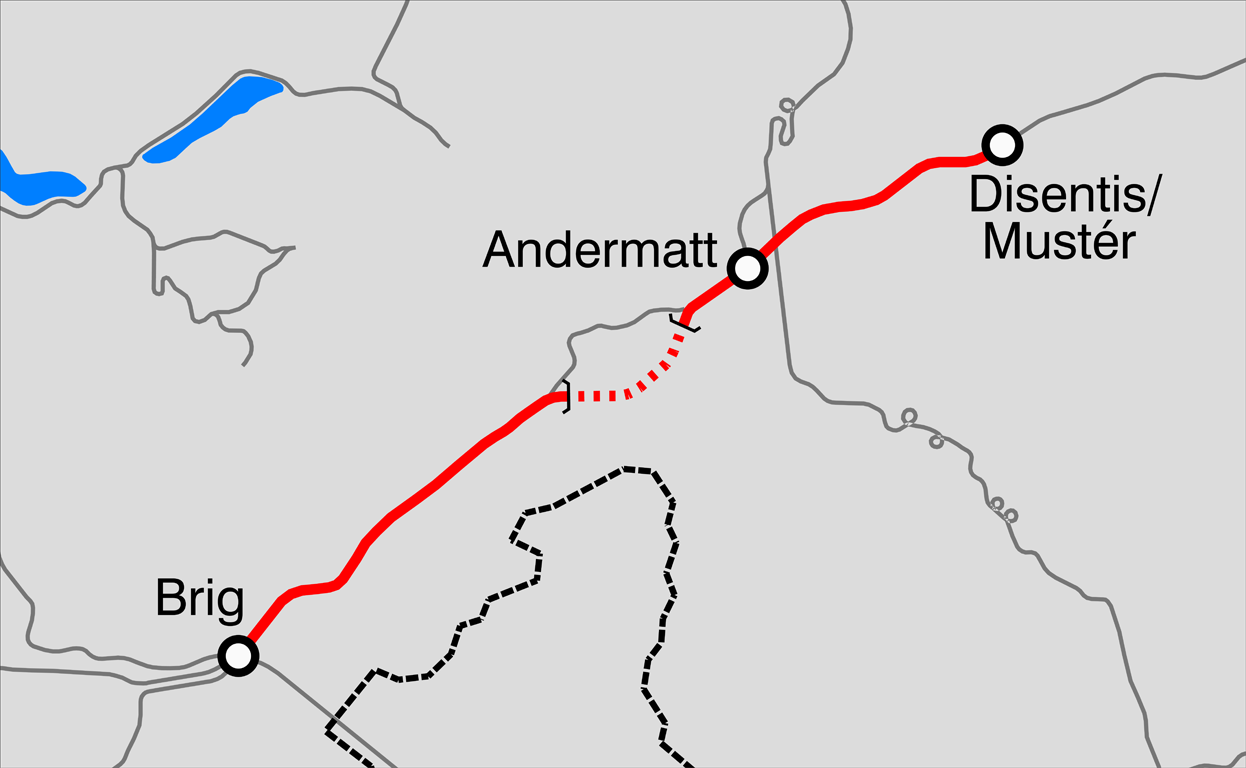
- Source: Swiss railway atlas

Loco 32 type HGe 4/4 at Gletsch, August 1956

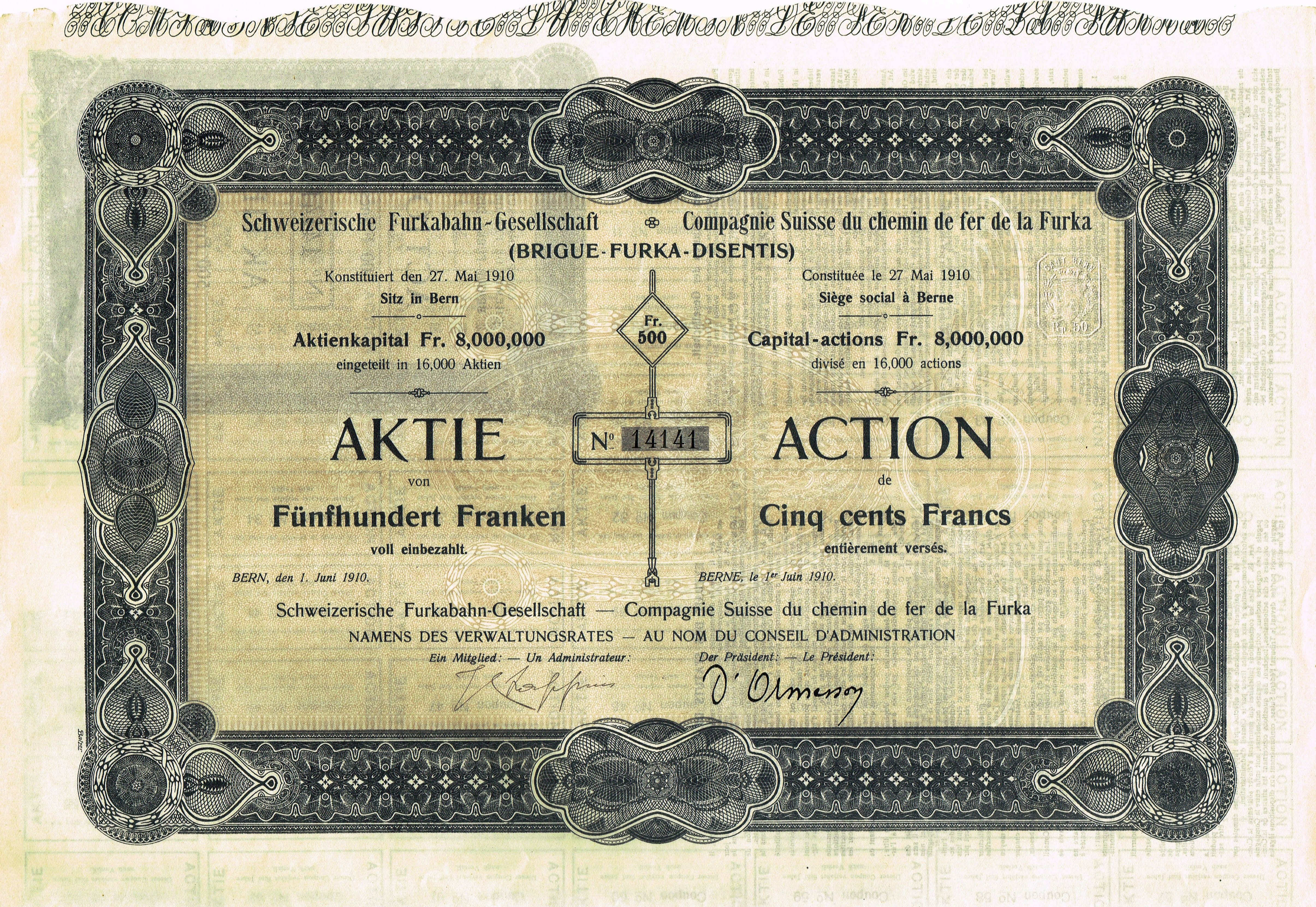
Share of the Compagnie Suisse du Chemin de fer de la Furka (Brig-Furka-Disentis – BFD)

The Furka Oberalp Railway (German: Furka Oberalp Bahn) is a narrow gauge mountain railway in Switzerland with a gauge of 1,000 mm (3 ft 3 3/8 in). It runs in the Graubünden, Uri and Canton of Valais. Since January 1, 2003, it is part of the Matterhorn Gotthard Bahn when it merged with the BVZ Zermatt-Bahn.

The line begins in Disentis in the canton of Graubünden, where there is a connection to the Rhätische Bahn (RhB). It then runs over the Oberalp Pass to Andermatt in the canton of Uri. Through the Furka Base Tunnel it reaches the Goms District area and Brig in the canton of Valais. In Brig, it connects to the BVZ Zermattbahn since 1930.

The first half of the line was opened by the French company Brig-Furka-Disentis Bahn (BFD) in 1914. Trains could go as far as Gletsch, starting from Brig. Construction of the second part over the Furka Pass and Oberalp Pass was well under way when the war situation in France halted all works by 1915. The company lingered on, but was finally bankrupt in 1923. Two years later the railway had a new owner, called Furka Oberalp Bahn, founded by the cantons and the neighbouring railway companies. Construction work resumed, now with important federal funds, and on July 4, 1926 regular through services between Brig and Disentis could start. RhB trains reached Disentis under electric traction in 1922.

In 1930 the tracks of the newly electrified BVZ reached Brig, which gave birth to the famous Glacier Express. The oncoming crisis and the war limited the number of tourists. Nevertheless the FO line was considered to be of strategic importance. This finally made funds available to electrify the line and purchase the necessary motive power. At the same time the Andermatt–Disentis line was protected against avalanches to allow winter services.

== Schöllenenbahn ==
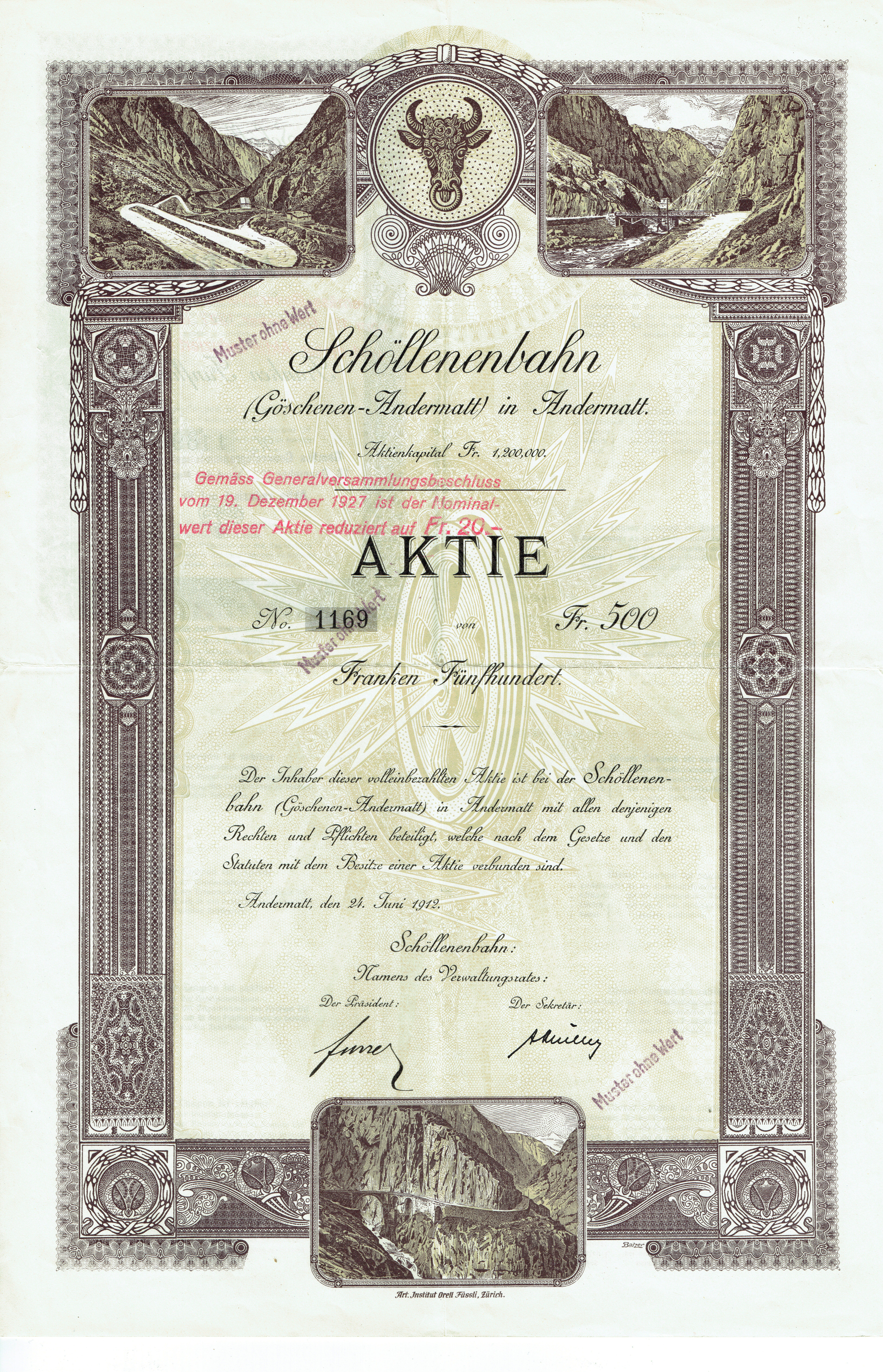
Share of the Schöllenenbahn, issued June 24, 1912

The Schöllenenbahn (SchB) was opened in 1917 from Göschenen up to Andermatt. It has a station connecting with the Gotthard railway line of the Swiss Federal Railways. Initially it was electrified with 1,200 V DC. In 1941, when electrification of FO started, SchB was converted to 11,000 V AC. In 1961, it merged with the Furka Oberalp Bahn.

== Furka Bergstrecke ==
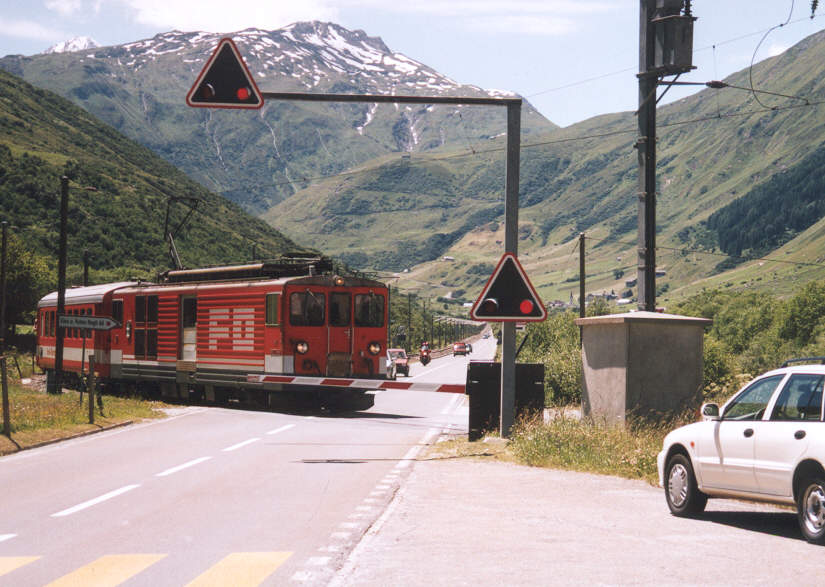
A train near Realp

There are many avalanches between Realp and Oberwald. The section over the Furka Pass used to be closed during winters. The mountain section was closed in the winter of 1981 and was replaced by a tunnel (length: 15.381 km or 9.557 mi) in 1982. The association called Verein Furka-Bergstrecke and the company Dampfbahn Furka-Bergstrecke now run a heritage railway with steam locomotives on the old route.

== Rolling stock ==
When FO was founded in 1925, it came in possession of the BFD rolling stock, introduced in 1914 and consisting of

- 10 steam locomotives HG 3/4 1–10, built by SLM
- 40 wooden coaches, of which 30 with bogies, including 10 luggage and mail vans, all built by SIG, Neuhausen
- 30 goods wagons, including 10 covered wagons, 10 open wagons and 10 flat cars, all built by Chantiers de la Buire at Lyon, France
- 17 goods wagons, purchased from RhB for the construction work on the line, originally built in 1888/89 by SIG and S.A. Nicaise & Delcuve, La Louvière, Belgium

For a long time, FO couldn't afford to buy new coaches and wagons and rebuilt many of these vehicles. Some of the large luggage and mail vans were rebuilt as passenger coaches, some became covered goods wagons. Two axle coaches got luggage compartments to provide for a well adapted transport capacity. When some coaches got new bogies from SWS, Schlieren in 1947, the old bogies were reused to build 4 covered wagons. During the Second World War, three flat wagons had been built using underframes from coaches. 1949 these coaches came back to service with new underframes and bogies from SIG. FO always suffered from not having really enough vehicles but was lucky having two neighbouring companies where additional rolling stock could be leased for peak traffic.

Electrification during the Second World War necessarily brought new rolling stock. SLM delivered together with

- MFO 5 locomotives HGe 4/4 31–35 and
- BBC 4 motor coaches BCFeh 2/4 42–43 and CFeh 2/4 44–45; number 41 had been delivered to Schöllenenbahn
- MFO and SIG 3 electric rotary snow ploughs Xrot e 1021–23 (later 4931–33)

Six of the steam locomotives were after the War sold to France (two) and Vietnam (four) while four locomotives remained. In 1946 a small electric shunter Te 2/2 1041 (later 4926) was built by SLM and SAAS for Brig station. Later, two more locomotives were delivered by SLM and MFO

- HGe 4/4 36 1948
- HGe 4/4 37 1956

The 1961 merger with Schöllenenbahn enlarged stock by

- 4 two-axle electric locomotives HGe 2/2 21–24
- 1 motor coach 41 (see above)
- 7 wooden coaches with bogies, all built in 1917 by SWS, Schlieren
- 6 goods wagons from 1917 (SWS)
- 5 goods wagons from 1943/44 (SWS)

Finally, after the merger, FO could begin with the modernisation of its rolling stock and took delivery of

- 3 luggage vans F4 (later D) 4341–43 by FFA/SIG 1961 which also served for a military rescue train
- 12 covered goods wagons K3s (later Gb-v) 4433–4444 by J. Meyer, Rheinfelden, 1964
- 10 cement silo wagons OB1 (later Uce) 4861–70 by J. Meyer, Rheinfelden, 1964/65
- 10 FFA1-type second class coaches B 4263–72 1965/68
- 2 flat cars O7s (later R-w) 4791–92 by J. Meyer, Rheinfelden, 1967
- 2 diesel locomotives HGm 4/4 61–62 to finally replace the last steam locomotives, delivered 1968 by SLM, BBC and MFO with Cummins diesels.

1971/72 FO took delivery of 4 push-pull consists with motor luggage vans, one additional motor to compensate for the loss of locomotive 35, destroyed in a head-on collision, and four additional driving trailers to form small push-pull consists with the existing motor coaches 41–45. The coaches were of SIG1-type, also introduced on BVZ, SBB-Brünigbahn, BOB and MOB.

- motor luggage van Deh 4/4 51–55, built by SIG and BBC
- second-class coaches B 4251–58
- composite driving trailers ABt 4151–54
- composite driving trailers ABt 4191–94

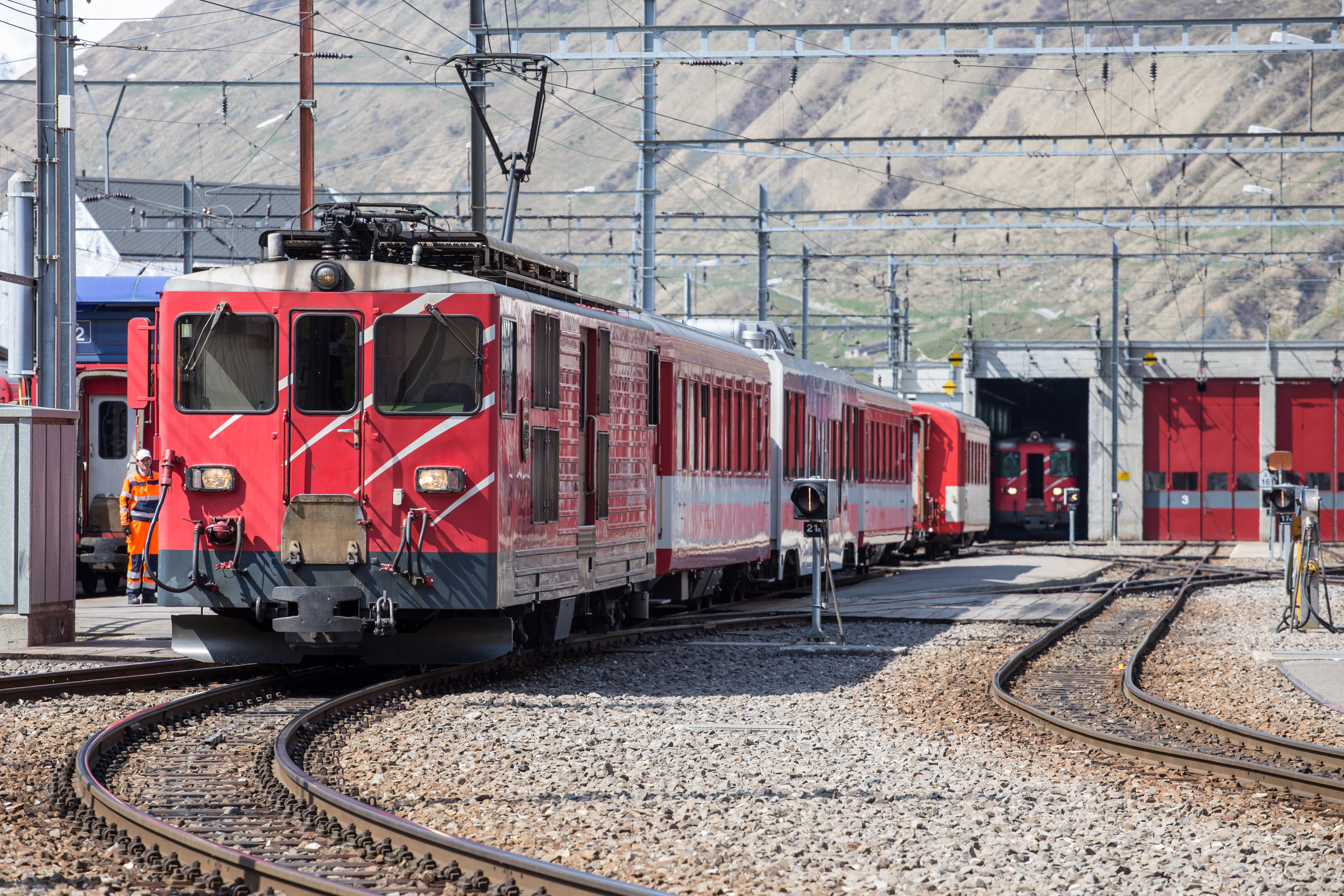
Deh 4/4 93 in Andermatt

All this rolling stock was, for motive power and coaches, all red with a simple FO inscription. With the opening of the new Furka tunnel approaching, the wooden coaches had to be replaced and the number of vehicles extended. The number of push-pull consists was extended to 9 long and 5 short ones. The coaches were of SIG2 type, also delivered to MOB. But now, the all-red-status should be left. A new livery in red with a white stripe was introduced and within a few years extended to existing modern rolling stock.

- 4 motor luggage vans Deh 4/4 91–94 built by SLM and BBC
- 16 second-class coaches B 4273–88
- 5 composite driving trailers ABt 4155–59
- 1 composite driving trailer ABt 4195
- 4 first-class coaches A 4063–66

For the Furka tunnel car shuttle trains, FO took delivery of

- 2 electric adhesion locomotives Ge 4/4 81–82
- 2 driving trailers with passenger and cycle compartment BDt 4361–62
- 5 end wagons Skl-tv 4801–05
- 12 car transporters with roof Skl-tv 4811–22

A little addition could be made some years later, but the coaches now came from ACMV Vevey

- 2 motor luggage vans Deh 4/4 95–96, delivered 1984 by SLM and BBC
- 7 car transporters Skl-tv 4806–07 and 4823–27, delivered 1984
- 1 car shuttle driving trailer BDt 4363, delivered 1985
- 2 composite coaches AB 4171–72, delivered 1987
- 2 composite driving trailers ABt 4181–82, delivered 1987

Finally FO got panoramic coaches as developed by MOB

- 4 Ramseier+Jenzer coaches on preused underframes PS 4011–14
- 10 Breda-built As 4021–30 on SIG bogies

There was no departmental stock for a long time except for one snow plough, introduced 1917. 1943 and 55 some tram wagons were bought and added to service stock. With modern stock arriving, many coaches and wagons were reused in departmental stock.

== See also ==
- Rail transport in Switzerland
- List of railway companies in Switzerland
