= List of highest railway stations in Switzerland =

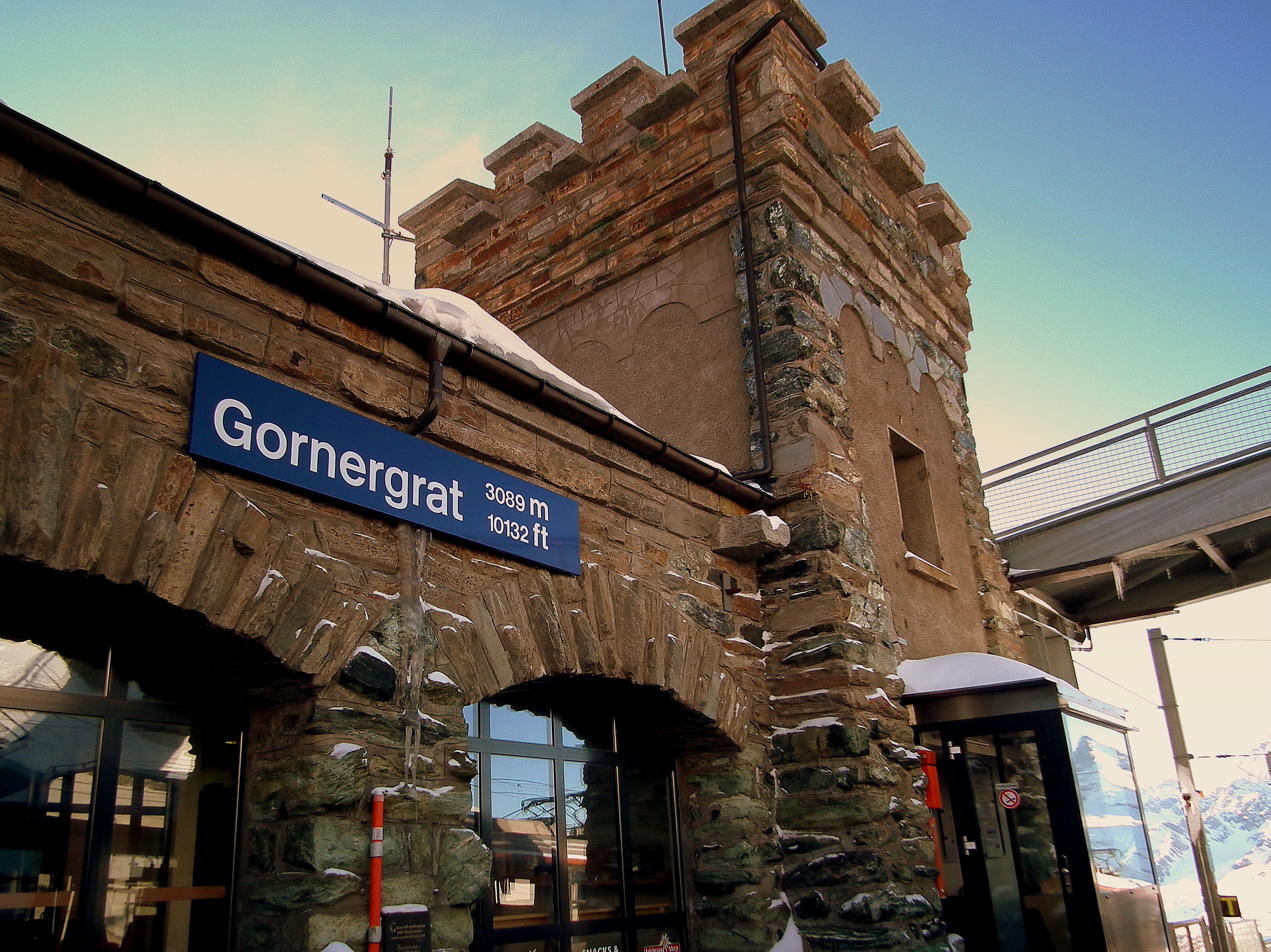
The Gornergrat railway station, the highest (open-air) railway station building on the continent

This is a list of railway stations in Switzerland located at an elevation over 1,200 metres above sea level. Switzerland includes most of the highest railways of Europe and therefore also includes its highest railway stations, both underground and open-air, on dead-end rail and on rail crossing. With the notable exception of the region of Graubünden, where are some of the highest European towns connected to railways, most of these stations are on railways that primarily carry tourists and are not used by commuters.

In the list are indicated the elevation, municipality, canton, railway and nearest location, inhabited or not.

For a list of the highest railways, see List of mountain railways in Switzerland. Note that this list does not include funicular nor any cable transport related facilities. For a list of funiculars, see List of funiculars in Switzerland. For a list of aerial tramways, see List of aerial tramways in Switzerland.

== Main list ==
Station	Elevation	Canton	Municipality	Railway	Location	Notes
Jungfraujoch	3,454 m (11,332 ft)	Valais	Fieschertal	Jungfrau	Jungfraujoch	Terminus, underground, highest station in Europe
Eismeer	3,160 m (10,367 ft)	Bern	Grindelwald	Jungfrau	Eismeer	Underground, second highest station in Europe
Gornergrat	3,090 m (10,138 ft)	Valais	Zermatt	Gornergrat	Gornergrat	Terminus, third highest station in Europe, highest open-air station in Europe
Eigerwand	2,865 m (9,400 ft)	Bern	Grindelwald	Jungfrau	Eiger north face	Underground
Rotenboden	2,815 m (9,236 ft)	Valais	Zermatt	Gornergrat	Rotenboden	Second highest open-air station in Europe
Riffelberg	2,582 m (8,471 ft)	Valais	Zermatt	Gornergrat	Riffelberg	Third highest open-air station in Europe
Eigergletscher	2,320 m (7,612 ft)	Bern	Lauterbrunnen	Jungfrau	Eiger Glacier	
Ospizio Bernina	2,253 m (7,392 ft)	Graubünden	Poschiavo	Bernina	Ospizio Bernina	Rail crossing (summit), highest rail mountain pass in Europe, highest station in Eastern Switzerland
Brienzer Rothorn	2,244 m (7,362 ft)	Bern	Brienz	Brienz–Rothorn	Brienzer Rothorn	Terminus
Riffelalp Resort	2,222 m (7,290 ft)	Valais	Zermatt	Riffelalp tram	Riffelalp Resort	
Riffelalp	2,211 m (7,254 ft)	Valais	Zermatt	Gornergrat/Riffelalp tram	Riffelalp	Highest station in Europe with two distinct railways
Furka	2,163 m (7,096 ft)	Uri	Realp	Furka Cogwheel Steam Railway	East portal of Furka Summit Tunnel	Rail crossing (summit), highest station in Central Switzerland
Muttbach-Belvédère	2,118 m (6,949 ft)	Valais	Obergoms	Furka Cogwheel Steam Railway	West portal of Furka Summit Tunnel	
Bernina Lagalb	2,100 m (6,890 ft)	Graubünden	Pontresina	Bernina	Bernina Lagalb	
Bernina Diavolezza	2,093 m (6,867 ft)	Graubünden	Pontresina	Bernina	Bernina Diavolezza	
Alp Grüm	2,091 m (6,860 ft)	Graubünden	Poschiavo	Bernina	Alp Grüm	
Bernina Suot	2,046 m (6,713 ft)	Graubünden	Pontresina	Bernina	Bernina Suot	
Pilatus Kulm	2,073 m (6,801 ft)	Obwalden	Alpnach	Pilatus	Pilatus	Terminus
Kleine Scheidegg	2,061 m (6,762 ft)	Bern	Lauterbrunnen	Wengernalp/Jungfrau	Kleine Scheidegg	Rail crossing (summit), highest railway hub in Switzerland (and Europe)
Oberalp Pass	2,033 m (6,670 ft)	Uri	Andermatt	Andermatt–Chur	Oberalp Pass	Rail crossing (summit)
Rochers de Naye	1,968 m (6,457 ft)	Vaud	Veytaux	Montreux–Glion–Rochers-de-Naye	Rochers de Naye	Terminus
Schynige Platte	1,967 m (6,453 ft)	Bern	Gündlischwand	Schynige Platte	Schynige Platte	Terminus
Morteratsch	1,896 m (6,220 ft)	Graubünden	Pontresina	Bernina	Morteratsch	
Wengernalp	1,874 m (6,148 ft)	Bern	Lauterbrunnen	Wengernalp	Wengernalp	
Tiefenbach	1,845 m (6,053 ft)	Uri	Realp	Furka Cogwheel Steam Railway	Tiefenbach	
Nätschen	1,842 m (6,043 ft)	Uri	Andermatt	Andermatt–Chur	Nätschen	
Surovas	1,822 m (5,978 ft)	Graubünden	Pontresina	Bernina	Pontresina (Surovas)	
Les Montuires	1,822 m (5,978 ft)	Valais	Finhaut	Les Montuires–Emosson	Les Montuires	Terminus
Pied du Barrage	1,820 m (5,971 ft)	Valais	Finhaut	Les Montuires–Emosson	Emosson Dam base	Terminus
Spinas	1,815 m (5,955 ft)	Graubünden	Bever	Albula	Spinas	
Bretaye	1,806 m (5,925 ft)	Vaud	Ollon	Bex–Villars–Bretaye	Col de Bretaye	Terminus
La Perche	1,795 m (5,889 ft)	Vaud	Montreux	Montreux–Glion–Rochers-de-Naye	La Perche	
Preda	1,789 m (5,869 ft)	Graubünden	Bergün	Albula	Preda	
St. Moritz	1,775 m (5,823 ft)	Graubünden	St. Moritz	Albula/Bernina	St. Moritz	Highest town station in Europe (Note: The term "town" refers here to urban areas with a significant population. Other higher railway stations may be connected to several buildings such as restaurants or hotels.)
Pontresina	1,774 m (5,820 ft)	Graubünden	Pontresina	Bernina/Pontresina–Scuol-Tarasp	Pontresina	
Findelbach	1,770 m (5,807 ft)	Valais	Zermatt	Gornergrat	Findelbach	
Gletsch	1,762 m (5,781 ft)	Valais	Obergoms	Furka Cogwheel Steam Railway	Gletsch	
Bouquetins	1,759 m (5,771 ft)	Vaud	Ollon	Bex–Villars–Bretaye	Bouquetins	
Rigi Kulm	1,752 m (5,748 ft)	Schwyz	Arth	Rigi	Rigi Kulm	Terminus
Arosa	1,739 m (5,705 ft)	Graubünden	Arosa	Chur-Arosa	Arosa	Terminus
Jaman	1,739 m (5,705 ft)	Vaud	Montreux	Montreux–Glion–Rochers-de-Naye	Montagne d'Amont	
Celerina	1,730 m (5,676 ft)	Graubünden	Celerina	Albula	Celerina	
Punt Muragl Staz	1,729 m (5,673 ft)	Graubünden	Celerina	Bernina	Pontresina (Muragl)	
Punt Muragl	1,728 m (5,669 ft)	Graubünden	Samedan	Pontresina–Scuol-Tarasp	Pontresina (Muragl)	
Celerina Staz	1,716 m (5,630 ft)	Graubünden	Celerina	Bernina	Celerina	
Bever	1,710 m (5,610 ft)	Graubünden	Bever	Albula/Pontresina–Scuol-Tarasp	Bever	
Samedan	1,705 m (5,594 ft)	Graubünden	Samedan	Albula/Pontresina–Scuol-Tarasp	Samedan	
Tschamut-Selva	1,702 m (5,584 ft)	Graubünden	Tujetsch	Andermatt–Chur	Tschamut	
La Punt Chamues-ch	1,697 m (5,568 ft)	Graubünden	La Punt Chamues-ch	Pontresina–Scuol-Tarasp	La Punt	
Madulain	1,697 m (5,568 ft)	Graubünden	Madulain	Pontresina–Scuol-Tarasp	Madulain	
Cavaglia	1,692 m (5,551 ft)	Graubünden	Poschiavo	Bernina	Cavaglia	
Zuoz	1,692 m (5,551 ft)	Graubünden	Zuoz	Pontresina–Scuol-Tarasp	Zuoz	
S-chanf	1,670 m (5,479 ft)	Graubünden	S-chanf	Pontresina–Scuol-Tarasp	S-chanf	
Mürren	1,639 m (5,377 ft)	Bern	Lauterbrunnen	Grütschalp–Mürren	Mürren	Terminus
Villars-sur-Ollon Golf	1,629 m (5,344 ft)	Vaud	Ollon	Bex–Villars–Bretaye	Golf de Villars	
Cinuos-chel-Brail	1,628 m (5,341 ft)	Graubünden	S-chanf	Pontresina–Scuol-Tarasp	Cinuos-chel	
Davos Wolfgang	1,625 m (5,331 ft)	Graubünden	Davos	Landquart–Klosters–Davos	Davos (Wolfgang)	
Alpiglen	1,616 m (5,302 ft)	Bern	Grindelwald	Wengernalp	Alpligen	
Zermatt/Zermatt GGB	1,605 m (5,266 ft)	Valais	Zermatt	Visp–Zermatt/Gornergrat	Zermatt	Two distinct stations with a rail link
Rigi Staffel	1,603 m (5,259 ft)	Schwyz	Arth	Rigi	Rigi Staffel	
Generoso Vetta	1,601 m (5,253 ft)	Ticino	Castel San Pietro	Monte Generoso	Monte Generoso	Terminus
Winteregg	1,578 m (5,177 ft)	Bern	Lauterbrunnen	Grütschalp–Mürren	Winteregg	
Davos Dorf	1,560 m (5,118 ft)	Graubünden	Davos	Landquart–Klosters–Davos	Davos (Dorf)	
Rigi Staffelhöhe	1,550 m (5,085 ft)	Lucerne	Weggis	Rigi	Rigi Staffelhöhe	
Breitlauenen	1,542 m (5,059 ft)	Bern	Gsteigwiler	Schynige Platte	Breitlauenen	
Davos Platz	1,540 m (5,052 ft)	Graubünden	Davos	Landquart–Klosters–Davos	Davos (Platz)	
Realp	1,538 m (5,046 ft)	Uri	Realp	Brig–Andermatt/Furka Cogwheel Steam Railway	Realp	
Col de Soud	1,524 m (5,000 ft)	Vaud	Ollon	Bex–Villars–Bretaye	Col de Soud	
Davos Laret	1,522 m (4,993 ft)	Graubünden	Davos	Landquart–Klosters–Davos	Davos (Laret)	
Allmend	1,509 m (4,951 ft)	Bern	Lauterbrunnen	Wengernalp	Allmend	
Davos Frauenkirch	1,505 m (4,938 ft)	Graubünden	Davos	Davos–Filisur	Davos (Frauenkirch)	
Grütschalp	1,487 m (4,879 ft)	Bern	Lauterbrunnen	Grütschalp–Mürren	Grütschalp	Terminus
Rigi First	1,480 m (4,856 ft)	Lucerne	Arth	Rigi	Rigi First	
Zernez	1,471 m (4,826 ft)	Graubünden	Zernez	Pontresina–Scuol-Tarasp	Zernez	
Davos Glaris	1,455 m (4,774 ft)	Graubünden	Davos	Davos–Filisur	Davos (Glaris)	
Hospental	1,452 m (4,764 ft)	Uri	Hospental	Brig–Andermatt	Hospental	
Litzirüti	1,452 m (4,764 ft)	Graubünden	Arosa	Chur-Arosa	Litzirüti	
Leysin Grand Hotel	1,451 m (4,760 ft)	Vaud	Leysin	Aigle–Leysin	Leysin	Terminus
Rueras	1,447 m (4,747 ft)	Graubünden	Tujetsch	Andermatt–Chur	Rueras	
Dieni	1,442 m (4,731 ft)	Graubünden	Tujetsch	Andermatt–Chur	Dieni	
Sedrun	1,441 m (4,728 ft)	Graubünden	Tujetsch	Andermatt–Chur	Sedrun	
Täsch	1,438 m (4,718 ft)	Valais	Täsch	Visp–Zermatt/Gornergrat	Täsch	
Andermatt	1,436 m (4,711 ft)	Uri	Andermatt	Brig–Andermatt/Göschenen–Andermatt	Andermatt	
Susch	1,435 m (4,708 ft)	Graubünden	Susch	Pontresina–Scuol-Tarasp	Susch	
Rigi Kaltbad	1,433 m (4,701 ft)	Lucerne	Weggis	Rigi	Rigi Kaltbad	
Bugnei	1,432 m (4,698 ft)	Graubünden	Tujetsch	Andermatt–Chur	Bugnei	
Sagliains	1,432 m (4,698 ft)	Graubünden	Susch	Pontresina–Scuol-Tarasp	South portal of the Vereina Tunnel	
Lavin	1,432 m (4,698 ft)	Graubünden	Lavin	Pontresina–Scuol-Tarasp	Lavin	
Guarda	1,431 m (4,695 ft)	Graubünden	Guarda	Pontresina–Scuol-Tarasp	Guarda	
Ardez	1,431 m (4,695 ft)	Graubünden	Ardez	Pontresina–Scuol-Tarasp	Ardez	
Paccot	1,430 m (4,692 ft)	Vaud	Montreux	Montreux–Glion–Rochers-de-Naye	Paccot	
Randa	1,407 m (4,616 ft)	Valais	Randa	Visp–Zermatt/Gornergrat	Randa	
Leysin Feydey	1,400 m (4,593 ft)	Vaud	Leysin	Aigle–Leysin	Leysin	
Cadera	1,383 m (4,537 ft)	Graubünden	Poschiavo	Bernina	Cadera	
Bergün/Bravuogn	1,372 m (4,501 ft)	Graubünden	Bergün	Albula	Bergün	
Oberwald	1,366 m (4,482 ft)	Valais	Obergoms	Brig–Andermatt/Furka Cogwheel Steam Railway	Oberwald	
Ämsigen	1,362 m (4,469 ft)	Obwalden	Alpnach	Pilatus	Pilatus	
Les Pléiades	1,360 m (4,462 ft)	Vaud	Blonay	Vevey–Les Pléiades	Les Pléiades	Terminus
Münster	1,359 m (4,459 ft)	Valais	Münster-Geschinen	Brig–Andermatt	Münster	
Obergesteln	1,354 m (4,442 ft)	Valais	Obergoms	Brig–Andermatt	Obergesteln	
Cavadürli	1,352 m (4,436 ft)	Graubünden	Klosters	Landquart–Klosters–Davos	Cavadürdli	
Ulrichen	1,347 m (4,419 ft)	Valais	Obergoms	Brig–Andermatt	Ulrichen	
Davos Monstein	1,346 m (4,416 ft)	Graubünden	Davos	Davos–Filisur	Davos (Monstein)	
Mumpé Tujetsch	1,344 m (4,409 ft)	Graubünden	Disentis	Andermatt–Chur	Mumpé Tujetsch	
Planalp	1,341 m (4,400 ft)	Bern	Brienz	Brienz–Rothorn	Planalp	
Geschinen	1,340 m (4,396 ft)	Valais	Münster-Geschinen	Brig–Andermatt	Geschinen	
Ftan	1,335 m (4,380 ft)	Graubünden	Ftan	Pontresina–Scuol-Tarasp	Ftan	
Brandegg	1,333 m (4,373 ft)	Bern	Grindelwald	Wengernalp	Brandegg	
Langwies	1,317 m (4,321 ft)	Graubünden	Arosa	Chur-Arosa	Langwies	
Reckingen	1,316 m (4,318 ft)	Valais	Reckingen-Gluringen	Brig–Andermatt	Reckingen	
Rigi Klösterli	1,316 m (4,318 ft)	Schwyz	Arth	Rigi	Rigi Klösterli	
Gluringen	1,310 m (4,298 ft)	Valais	Reckingen-Gluringen	Brig–Andermatt	Gluringen	
Scuol-Tarasp	1,287 m (4,222 ft)	Graubünden	Scuol	Pontresina–Scuol-Tarasp	Scuol	
Crêt d'y Bau	1,286 m (4,219 ft)	Vaud	Montreux	Montreux–Glion–Rochers-de-Naye	Crêt d'y Bau	
Biel	1,283 m (4,209 ft)	Valais	Grafschaft	Brig–Andermatt	Biel	
Breitmatten	1,280 m (4,199 ft)	Valais	St. Niklaus	Visp–Zermatt	Breitmatten	
Segnas	1,276 m (4,186 ft)	Graubünden	Disentis	Andermatt–Chur	Segnas	
Wengen	1,275 m (4,183 ft)	Bern	Lauterbrunnen	Wengernalp	Wengen	
Blitzingen	1,270 m (4,167 ft)	Valais	Blitzingen	Brig–Andermatt	Blitzingen	
Leysin Village	1,270 m (4,167 ft)	Vaud	Leysin	Aigle–Leysin	Leysin	
Saanenmöser	1,269 m (4,163 ft)	Bern	Saanen	Montreux–Lenk im Simmental line	Saanenmöser	Rail crossing (near summit)
Herbriggen	1,255 m (4,117 ft)	Valais	St. Niklaus	Visp–Zermatt	Herbriggen	
Villars-sur-Ollon	1,253 m (4,111 ft)	Vaud	Ollon	Bex–Villars–Bretaye	Villars-sur-Ollon	
Niederwald	1,245 m (4,085 ft)	Valais	Niederwald	Brig–Andermatt	Niederwald	
Peist	1,244 m (4,081 ft)	Graubünden	Arosa	Chur-Arosa	Peist	
Lally	1,240 m (4,068 ft)	Vaud	Blonay	Vevey–Les Pléiades	Lally	
Arveyes	1,231 m (4,039 ft)	Vaud	Ollon	Bex–Villars–Bretaye	Arveyes	
Schönried	1,230 m (4,035 ft)	Bern	Saanen	Montreux–Lenk im Simmental line	Schönried	
Mattsand	1,227 m (4,026 ft)	Valais	St. Niklaus	Visp–Zermatt	Mattsand	
Finhaut	1,224 m (4,016 ft)	Valais	Finhaut	Martigny–Châtelard	Finhaut	
Bellavista	1,222 m (4,009 ft)	Ticino	Mendrisio	Monte Generoso	Bellavista	
La Clairière	1,219 m (3,999 ft)	Vaud	Ollon	Bex–Villars–Bretaye	Arveyes	
Goppenstein	1,216 m (3,990 ft)	Valais	Ferden	Lötschberg	Goppenstein	Rail crossing (near summit), highest station of the main Swiss railway network (Note: Adhesion and standard gauge railways)
La Barboleuse	1,211 m (3,973 ft)	Vaud	Gryon	Bex–Villars–Bretaye	Gryon (La Barboleuse)	
La Givrine	1,208 m (3,963 ft)	Vaud	Saint-Cergue	Nyon–St-Cergue–La Cure	Col de la Givrine	Rail crossing (near summit), highest station in the Jura Mountains
Acla da Fontauna	1,205 m (3,953 ft)	Graubünden	Disentis	Andermatt–Chur	Disentis (Acla da Fontauna)	
Fürgangen-Bellwald Talstation	1,202 m (3,944 ft)	Valais	Bellwald	Brig–Andermatt	Fürgangen	

== See also ==
- Rail transport in Switzerland
- List of funiculars in Switzerland
- List of buildings and structures in Switzerland above 3000 m
- List of highest railway stations in Europe
