= Gluringen railway station =

Railway station in Goms, Switzerland

Gluringen
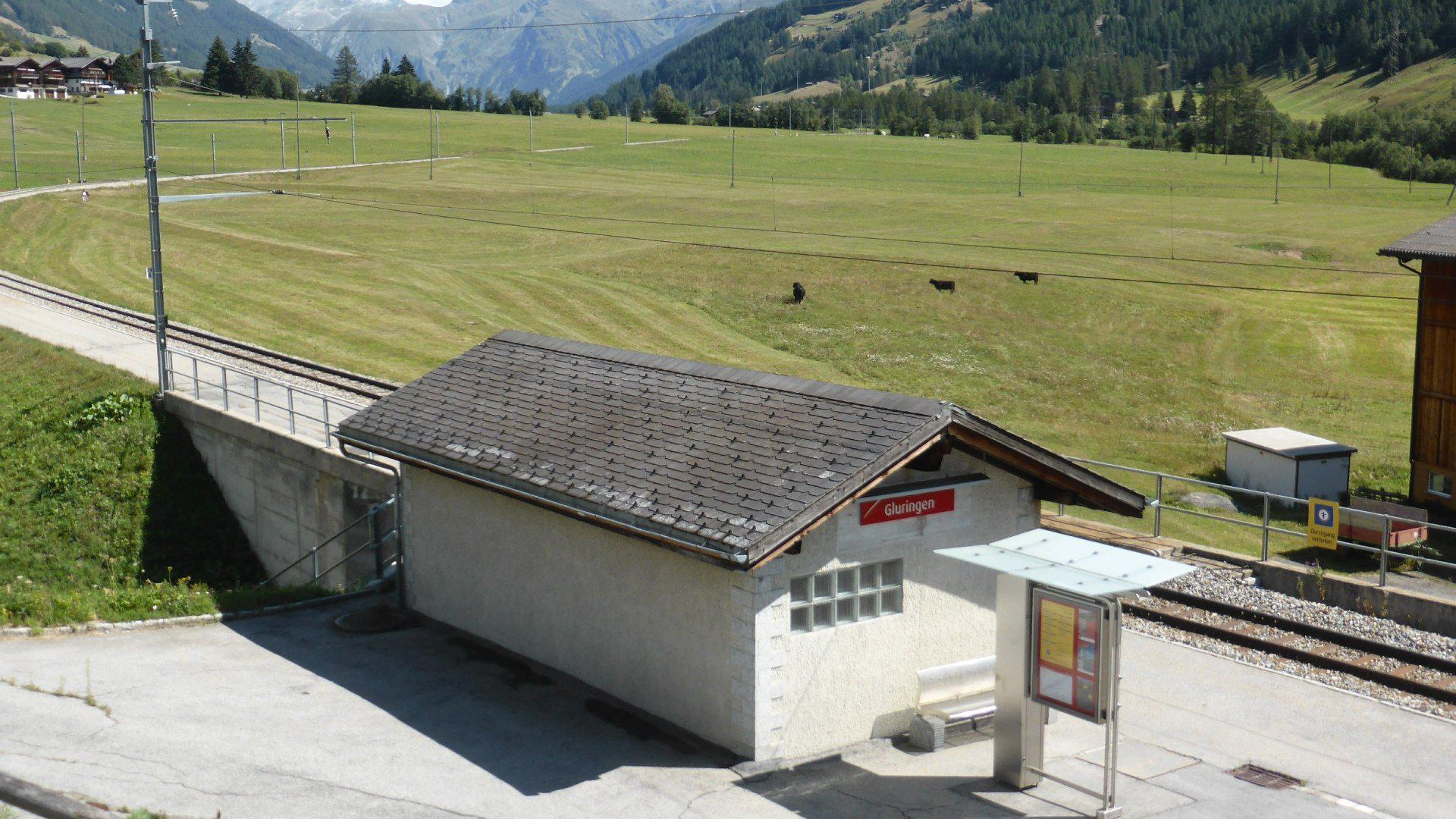
- The station building in 2018

General information
- Location: Goms; Switzerland
- Coordinates: 46°27′47″N 8°14′02″E
- Elevation: 1,311 m (4,301 ft)
- Owner: Matterhorn Gotthard Bahn
- Line: Furka Oberalp line
- Distance: 29.4 kilometres (18.3 mi) from Brig Bahnhofplatz
- Platforms: 1 side platform
- Tracks: 1
- Train operators: Matterhorn Gotthard Bahn

Construction
- Accessible: No

Other information
- Station code: 8501667 (GLUR)

Passengers
- 2023: 120 per weekday (MGB)

Services
Preceding station	Matterhorn Gotthard Bahn	Following station
Biel (Goms) towards Visp	R 43	Reckingen towards Andermatt
Location

Gluringen railway station (German: Bahnhof Gluringen), is a railway station in the locality of Reckingen-Gluringen, within the municipality of Goms, in the Swiss canton of Valais. It is an intermediate stop and a request stop on the 1,000 mm (3 ft 3 3/8 in) metre gauge Furka Oberalp line of the Matterhorn Gotthard Bahn and is served by local trains only.

== Services ==
As of the December 2023 timetable change, the following services stop at Gluringen:

- Regio: hourly service between Visp and Andermatt.
