= Biner =

Biner may refer to:

- Joseph Biner (1697—1766), Swiss Roman Catholic canonist, historian and theologian
- Carabiner, or biner, a shackle used in climbing

== See also ==
- Byner (disambiguation)
