= Biel (Goms) railway station =

Railway station in Goms, Switzerland

Biel (Goms)
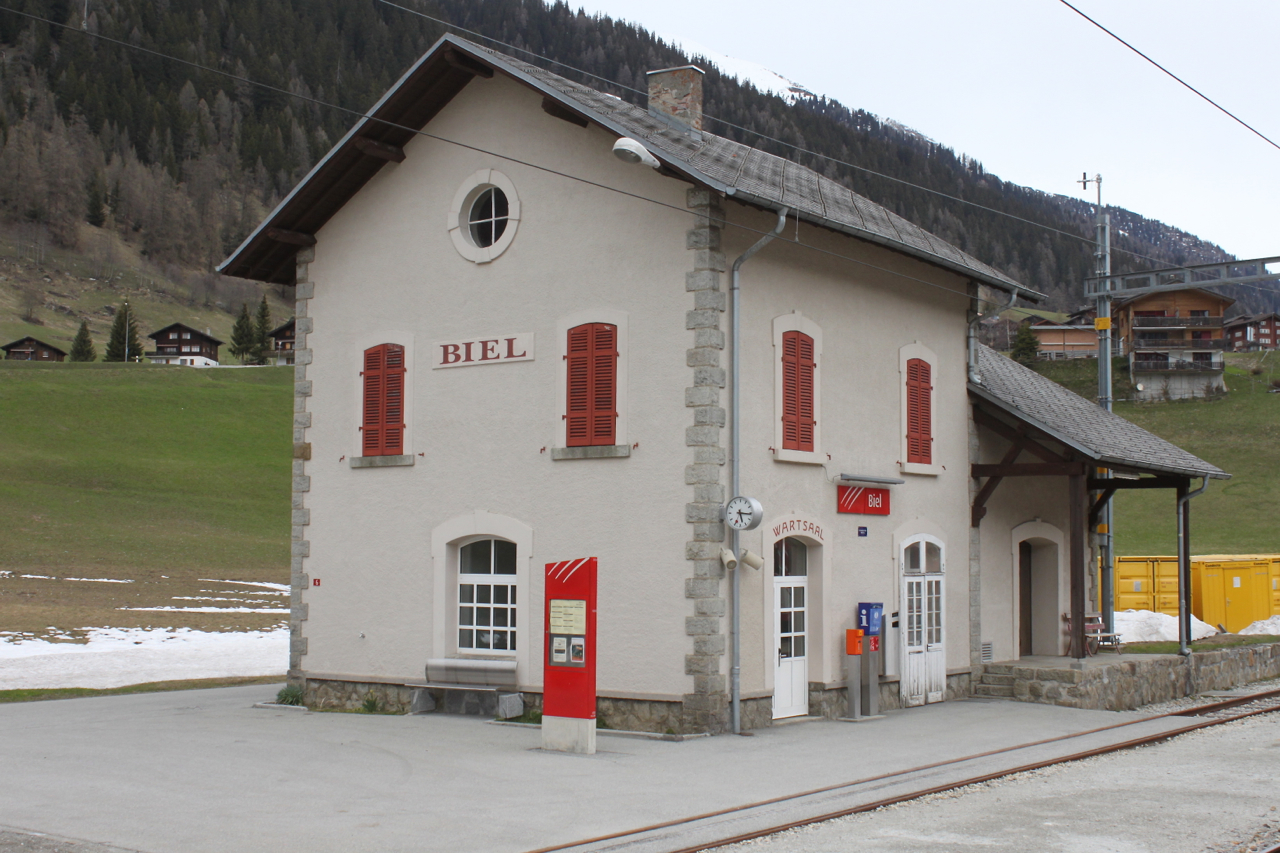
- The station building in 2012

General information
- Location: Goms; Switzerland
- Coordinates: 46°27′18″N 8°13′08″E
- Elevation: 1,283 m (4,209 ft)
- Owner: Matterhorn Gotthard Bahn
- Line: Furka Oberalp line
- Distance: 27.9 kilometres (17.3 mi) from Brig Bahnhofplatz
- Platforms: 2
- Tracks: 2
- Train operators: Matterhorn Gotthard Bahn

Construction
- Accessible: Yes

Other information
- Station code: 8501668 (BIGO)

History
- Former names: Biel FO

Passengers
- 2023: 150 per weekday (MGB)

Services
| Preceding station | Matterhorn Gotthard Bahn | Following station |
|---|---|---|
| Blitzingen towards Visp | R 43 | Gluringen towards Andermatt |
Location

Biel (Goms) railway station (German: Bahnhof Biel (Goms)), is a railway station in the locality of Biel, within the municipality of Goms, in the Swiss canton of Valais. It is an intermediate stop and a request stop on the 1,000 mm (3 ft 3 3/8 in) metre gauge Furka Oberalp line of the Matterhorn Gotthard Bahn and is served by local trains only.

== Services ==
As of the December 2023 timetable change, the following services stop at Biel (Goms):

- Regio: hourly service between Visp and Andermatt.
