= Reckingen VS railway station =

Railway station in Goms, Switzerland

Reckingen VS
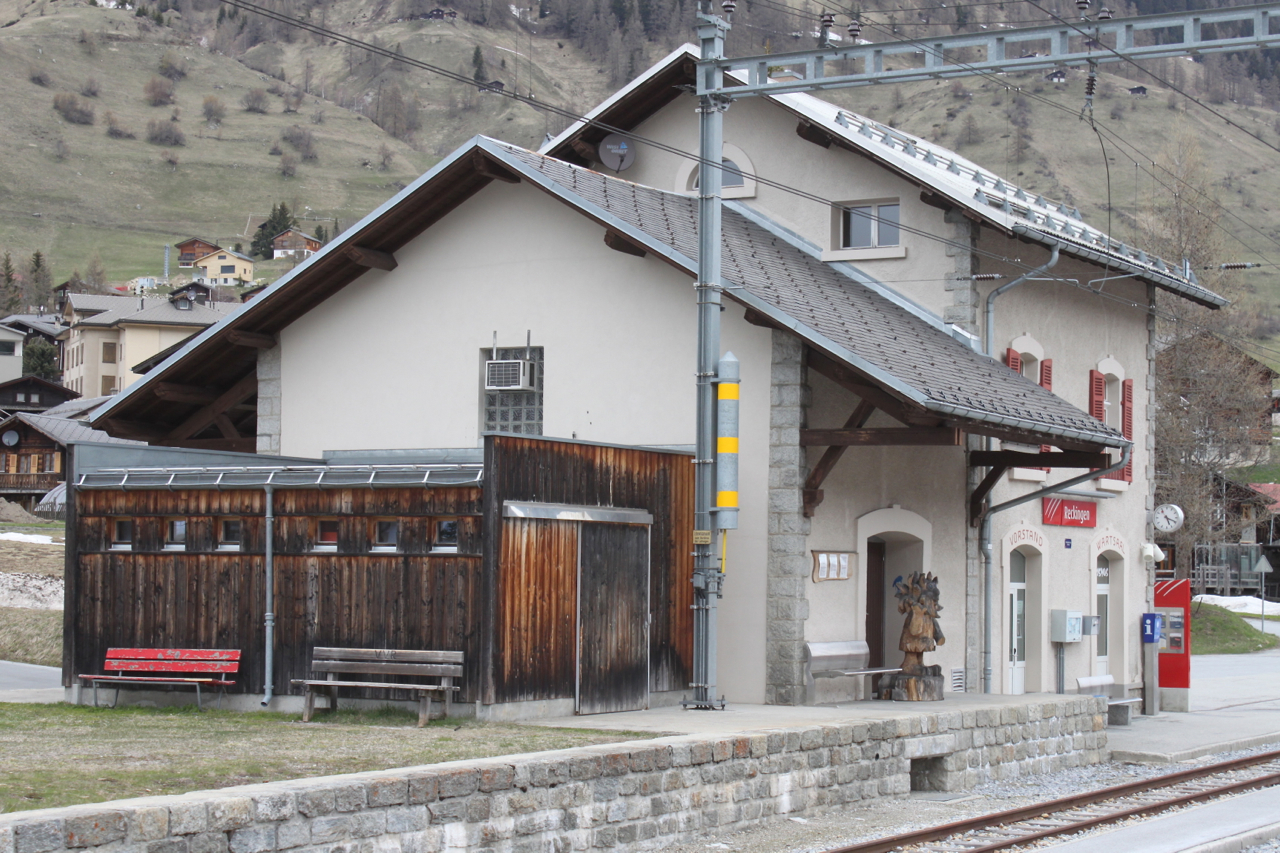
- The station building in 2012

General information
- Location: Goms; Switzerland
- Coordinates: 46°28′05″N 8°14′38″E
- Elevation: 1,316 m (4,318 ft)
- Owner: Matterhorn Gotthard Bahn
- Line: Furka Oberalp line
- Distance: 30.6 kilometres (19.0 mi) from Brig Bahnhofplatz
- Platforms: 2 (1 island platform)
- Tracks: 3
- Train operators: Matterhorn Gotthard Bahn

Construction
- Parking: 10
- Accessible: Yes

Other information
- Station code: 8501666 (RECK)

Passengers
- 2023: 360 per weekday (MGB)

Services
Preceding station	Matterhorn Gotthard Bahn	Following station
Gluringen towards Visp	R 43	Münster VS towards Andermatt
Location

Reckingen VS railway station (German: Bahnhof Reckingen VS), is a railway station in the locality of Reckingen-Gluringen, within the municipality of Goms, in the Swiss canton of Valais. It is an intermediate stop on the 1,000 mm (3 ft 3 3/8 in) metre gauge Furka Oberalp line of the Matterhorn Gotthard Bahn and is served by local trains only.

== Services ==
As of the December 2023 timetable change, the following services stop at Reckingen VS:

- Regio: hourly service between Visp and Andermatt.
