= Geschinen railway station =

Railway station in Goms, Switzerland

Geschinen
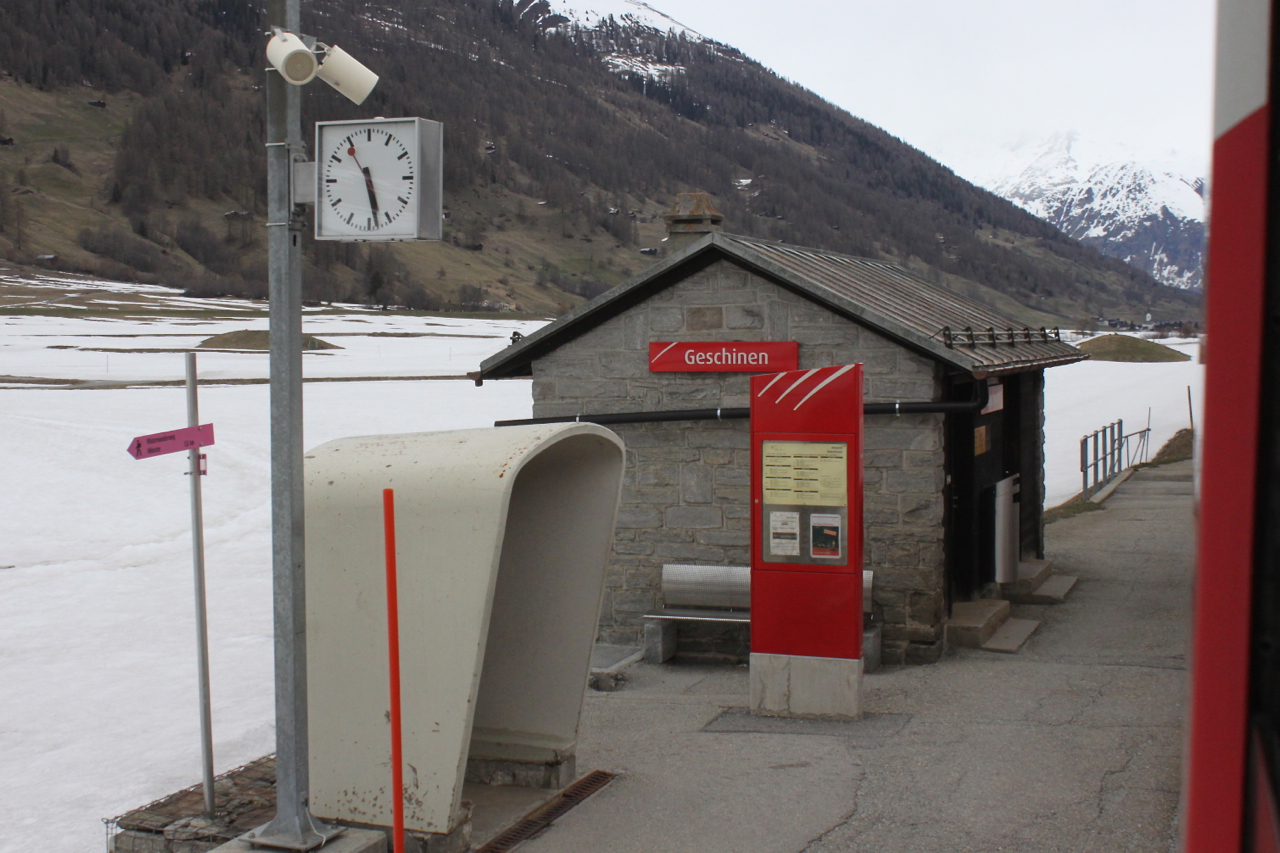
- The station platform in 2012

General information
- Location: Goms; Switzerland
- Coordinates: 46°29′31″N 8°16′55″E
- Elevation: 1,340 m (4,400 ft)
- Owner: Matterhorn Gotthard Bahn
- Line: Furka Oberalp line
- Distance: 34.7 kilometres (21.6 mi) from Brig Bahnhofplatz
- Platforms: 1 side platform
- Tracks: 1
- Train operators: Matterhorn Gotthard Bahn

Construction
- Accessible: Yes

Other information
- Station code: 8501664 (GES)

Passengers
- 2023: 160 per weekday (MGB)

Services
Preceding station	Matterhorn Gotthard Bahn	Following station
Münster VS towards Visp	R 43	Ulrichen towards Andermatt
Location

Geschinen railway station (German: Bahnhof Geschinen), is a railway station in the locality of Münster-Geschinen, within the municipality of Goms, in the Swiss canton of Valais. It is an intermediate stop and a request stop on the 1,000 mm (3 ft 3 3/8 in) metre gauge Furka Oberalp line of the Matterhorn Gotthard Bahn and is served by local trains only.

== Services ==
As of the December 2023 timetable change, the following services stop at Geschinen:

- Regio: hourly service between Visp and Andermatt.
