= Münster VS railway station =

Railway station in Goms, Switzerland

Münster VS
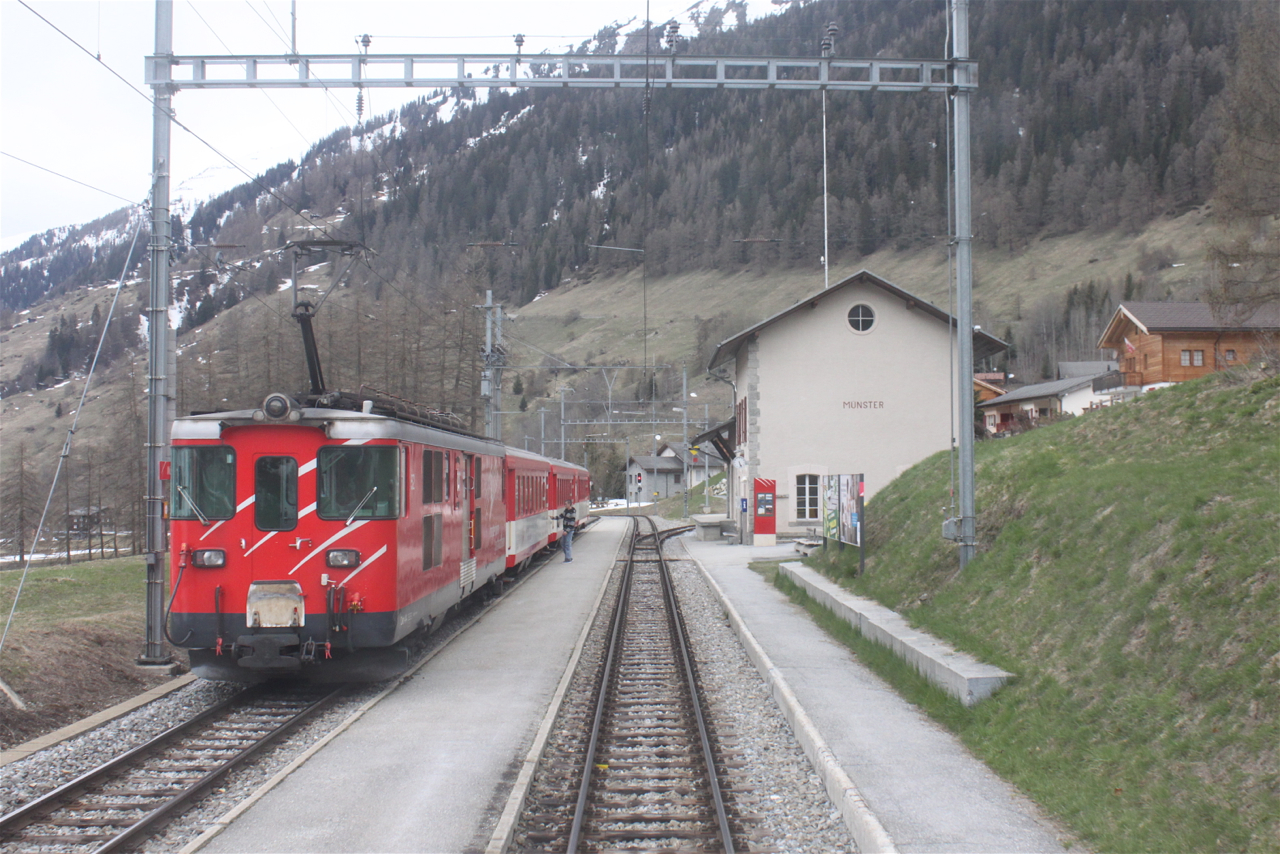
- A train at the station in 2012

General information
- Location: Goms; Switzerland
- Coordinates: 46°29′06″N 8°16′01″E
- Elevation: 1,359 m (4,459 ft)
- Owner: Matterhorn Gotthard Bahn
- Line: Furka Oberalp line
- Distance: 33.3 kilometres (20.7 mi) from Brig Bahnhofplatz
- Platforms: 2
- Tracks: 2
- Train operators: Matterhorn Gotthard Bahn

Construction
- Parking: 4
- Accessible: No

Other information
- Station code: 8501665 (MUET)

Passengers
- 2023: 580 per weekday (MGB)

Services
Preceding station	Matterhorn Gotthard Bahn	Following station
Reckingen VS towards Visp	R 43	Geschinen towards Andermatt
Location

Münster VS railway station (German: Bahnhof Münster VS), is a railway station in the locality of Münster-Geschinen, within the municipality of Goms, in the Swiss canton of Valais. It is an intermediate stop on the 1,000 mm (3 ft 3 3/8 in) metre gauge Furka Oberalp line of the Matterhorn Gotthard Bahn and is served by local trains only.

== Services ==
As of the December 2023 timetable change, the following services stop at Münster VS:

- Regio: hourly service between Visp and Andermatt.
