= Croix D'or et Poste =

Coordinates: 46.4873°N 8.2639°E

- Industry: Hotel
- Founded: 1620
- Headquarters: Furkastrasse 79, 3985, Münster, Valais, Switzerland
- Website: www.hotel-postmuenster.ch

Croix D'or et Poste is the oldest hotel in Münster, Switzerland, the former aristocratic family residence founded in 1620.

The hotel includes restaurant and a wine cellar with well-known Valais wines.

== See also ==
- List of oldest companies
