= Obergesteln railway station =

Railway station in Obergoms, Switzerland

Obergesteln
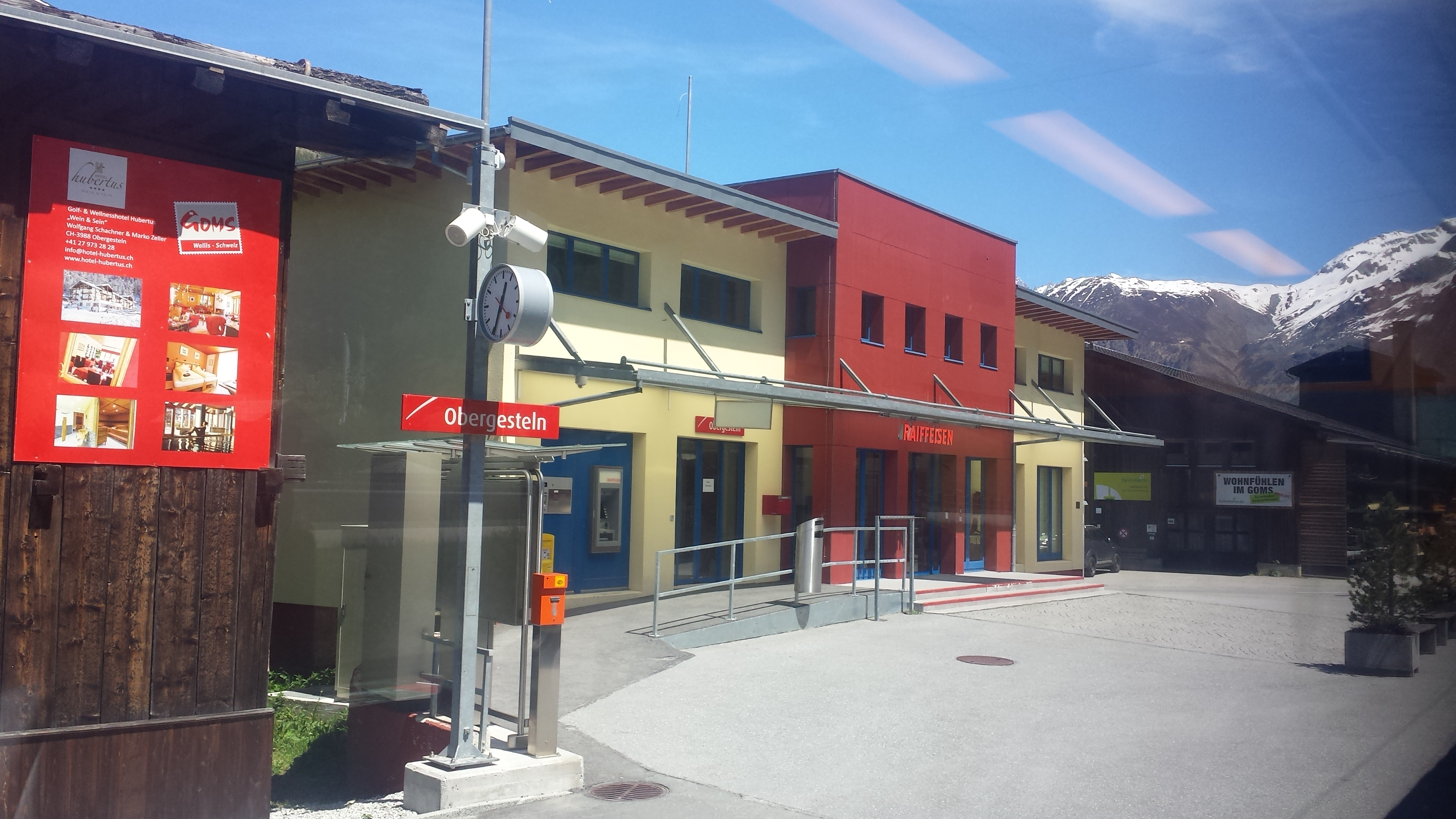
- The station in 2017

General information
- Location: Obergoms; Switzerland
- Coordinates: 46°30′47″N 8°19′34″E
- Elevation: 1,357 m (4,452 ft)
- Owner: Matterhorn Gotthard Bahn
- Line: Furka Oberalp line
- Distance: 39.0 kilometres (24.2 mi) from Brig Bahnhofplatz
- Platforms: 1 side platform
- Tracks: 1
- Train operators: Matterhorn Gotthard Bahn

Construction
- Accessible: Yes

Other information
- Station code: 8501662 (OBGE)

Passengers
- 2023: 250 per weekday (MGB)

Services
Preceding station	Matterhorn Gotthard Bahn	Following station
Ulrichen towards Visp	R 43	Oberwald towards Andermatt
Location

Obergesteln railway station (German: Bahnhof Obergesteln), is a railway station in the locality of Obergesteln, within the municipality of Obergoms, in the Swiss canton of Valais. It is an intermediate stop and a request stop on the 1,000 mm (3 ft 3 3/8 in) metre gauge Furka Oberalp line of the Matterhorn Gotthard Bahn and is served by local trains only.

== Services ==
As of the December 2023 timetable change, the following services stop at Obergesteln:

- Regio: hourly service between Visp and Andermatt.
