= Ulrichen railway station =

Railway station in Obergoms, Switzerland

Ulrichen
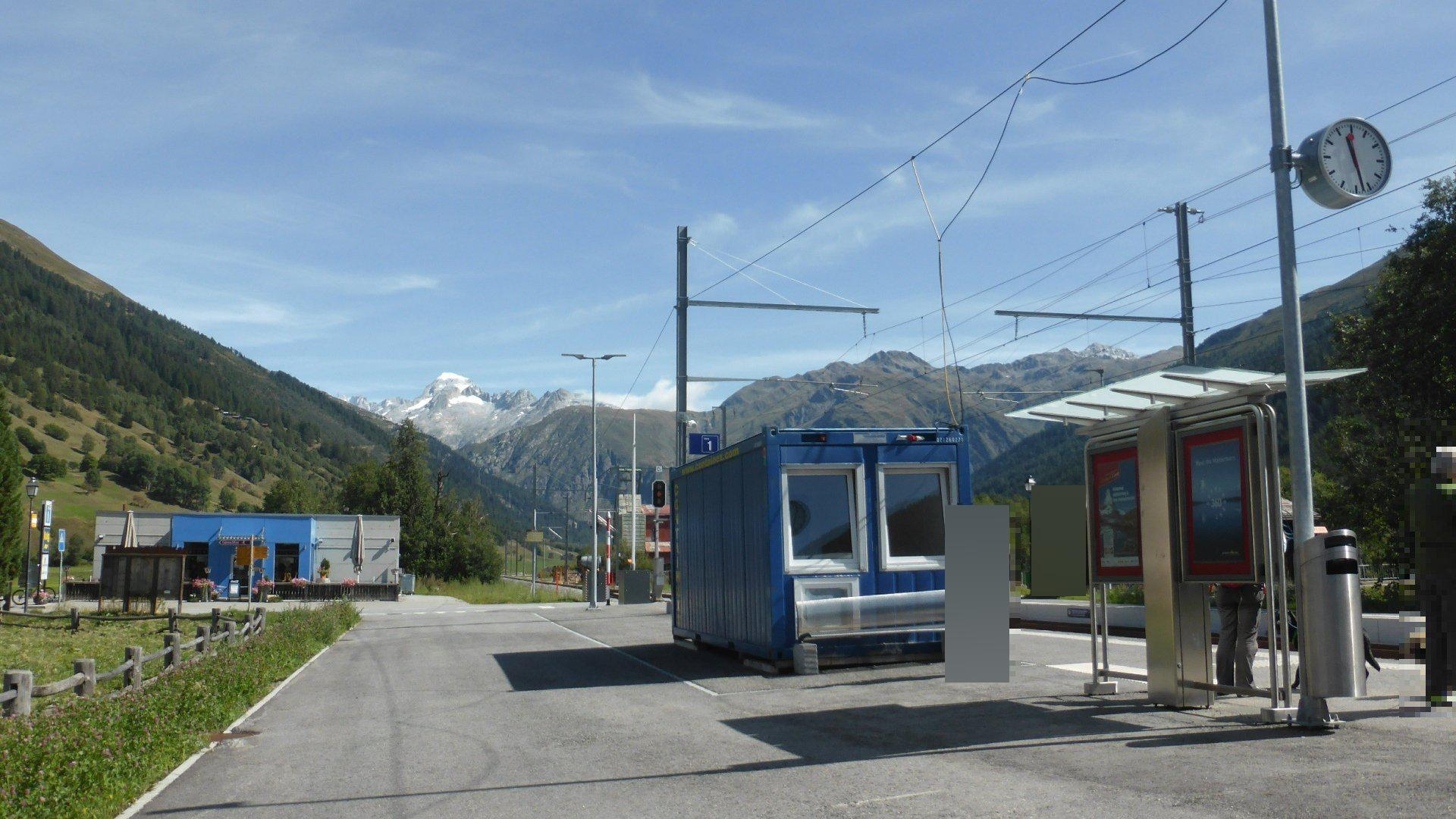
- The station platform in 2018

General information
- Location: Obergoms; Switzerland
- Coordinates: 46°30′18″N 8°18′32″E
- Elevation: 1,347 m (4,419 ft)
- Owner: Matterhorn Gotthard Bahn
- Line: Furka Oberalp line
- Distance: 37.3 kilometres (23.2 mi) from Brig Bahnhofplatz
- Platforms: 2 side platforms
- Tracks: 2
- Train operators: Matterhorn Gotthard Bahn
- Connections: PostAuto AG bus line

Construction
- Accessible: Yes

Other information
- Station code: 8501663 (ULR)

Passengers
- 2023: 340 per weekday (MGB)

Services
Preceding station	Matterhorn Gotthard Bahn	Following station
Geschinen towards Visp	R 43	Obergesteln towards Andermatt
Location

Ulrichen railway station (German: Bahnhof Ulrichen), is a railway station in the locality of Ulrichen, within the municipality of Obergoms, in the Swiss canton of Valais. It is an intermediate stop and a request stop on the 1,000 mm (3 ft 3 3/8 in) metre gauge Furka Oberalp line of the Matterhorn Gotthard Bahn and is served by local trains only.

== Services ==
As of the December 2023 timetable change, the following services stop at Ulrichen:

- Regio: hourly service between Visp and Andermatt.
