= Kalpetran railway station =

Railway station in Embd, Switzerland

Kalpetran
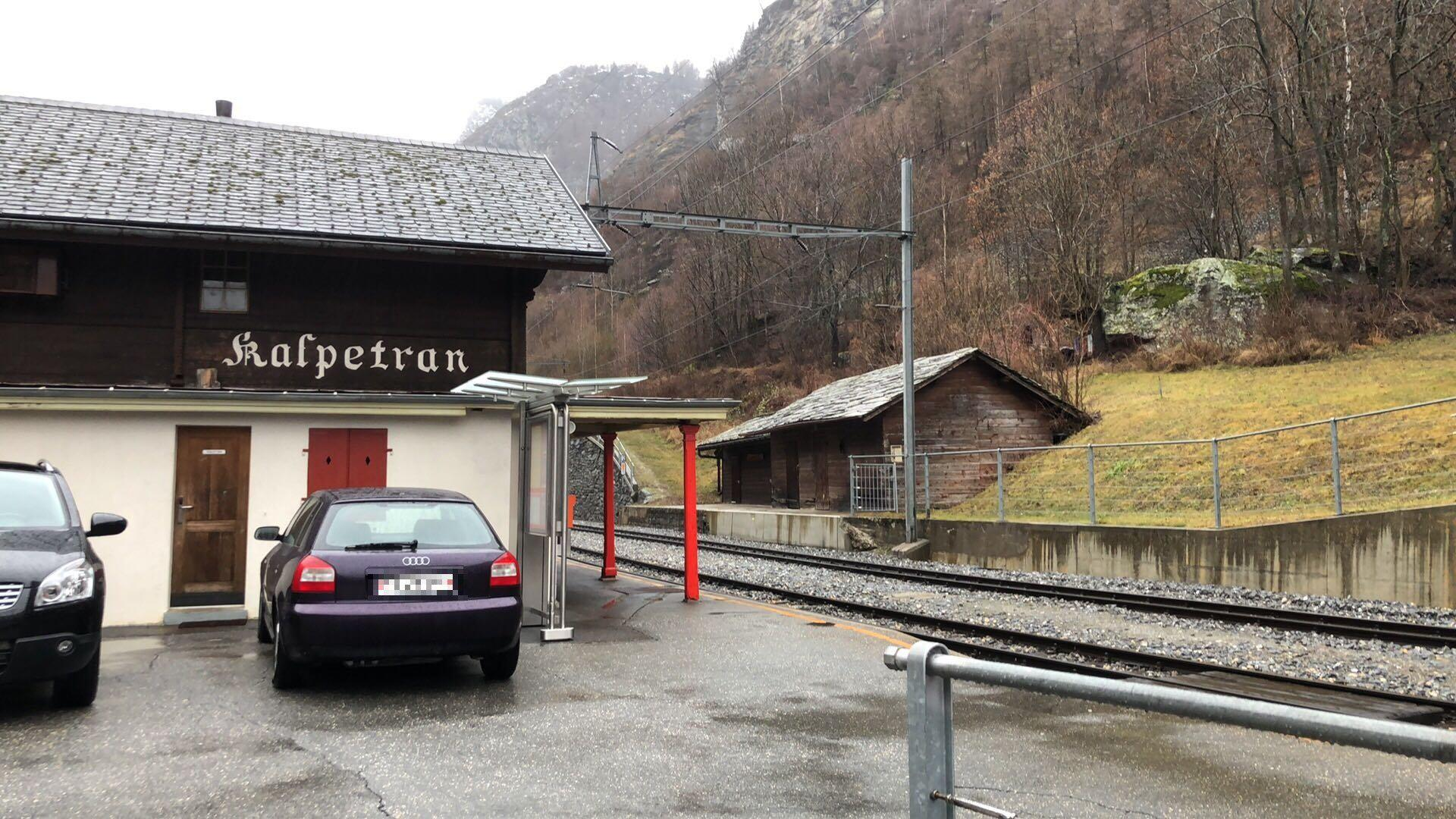
- The station building in 2018

General information
- Location: Embd; Switzerland
- Coordinates: 46°12′50″N 7°50′13″E
- Elevation: 897 m (2,943 ft)
- Owner: Matterhorn Gotthard Bahn
- Line: Brig–Zermatt line
- Distance: 24.21 km (15.04 mi) from Zermatt
- Platforms: 2 side platforms
- Tracks: 2
- Train operators: Matterhorn Gotthard Bahn
- Connections: Luftseilbahn Kalpetran-Embd

Construction
- Accessible: Partly

Other information
- Station code: 8501684 (KALP)

Passengers
- 2023: 220 per weekday (MGB)

Services
Preceding station	Matterhorn Gotthard Bahn	Following station
St. Niklaus VS towards Zermatt	RE 41	Stalden-Saas towards Visp
St. Niklaus VS towards Zermatt	RE 42	Stalden-Saas towards Fiesch
Location

Kalpetran railway station, (German: Bahnhof Kalpetran, French: Gare de Kalpetran) is a railway station in the municipality of Embd, in the Swiss canton of Valais. It is an intermediate stop on the 1,000 mm (3 ft 3 3/8 in) Brig–Zermatt line and is served by local trains only. The station is a request stop, so passengers wishing to board or disembark must press the stop on demand button at the station or on the train.

== Services ==
As of the December 2023 timetable change, the following services stop at Kalpetran:

- Regio: half-hourly service between Zermatt and Visp, with every other train continuing from Visp to Fiesch.
