= Stalden-Saas railway station =

Railway station in Stalden, Switzerland

Stalden-Saas
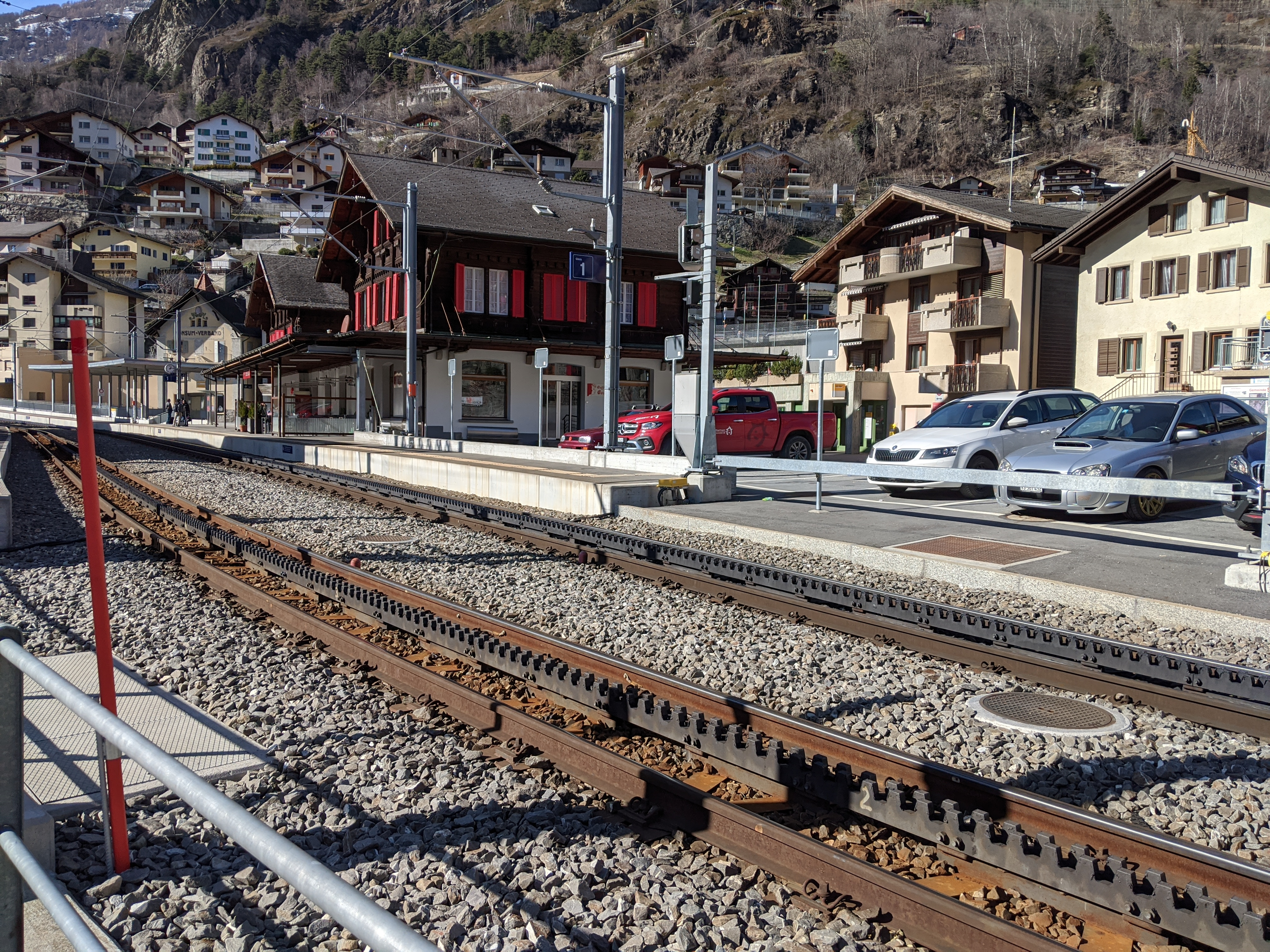
- The station building and platforms in 2020

General information
- Location: Stalden; Switzerland
- Coordinates: 46°13′55″N 7°52′16″E
- Elevation: 800 m (2,600 ft)
- Owner: Matterhorn Gotthard Bahn
- Line: Brig–Zermatt line
- Distance: 27.72 km (17.22 mi) from Zermatt
- Platforms: 2 side platforms
- Tracks: 2
- Train operators: Matterhorn Gotthard Bahn
- Connections: PostAuto AG buses

Construction
- Accessible: Partly

Other information
- Station code: 8501683 (STAS)

Passengers
- 2023: 860 per weekday (MGB)

Services
Preceding station	Matterhorn Gotthard Bahn	Following station
Kalpetran towards Zermatt	RE 41	Visp Terminus
Kalpetran towards Zermatt	RE 42	Visp towards Fiesch
Location

Stalden-Saas railway station (German: Bahnhof Stalden-Saas, French: Gare de Stalden-Saas) is a railway station in the municipality of Stalden, in the Swiss canton of Valais. It is an intermediate stop on the 1,000 mm (3 ft 3 3/8 in) metre gauge Brig–Zermatt line and is served by local trains only.

== Services ==
As of the December 2023 timetable change, the following services stop at Stalden-Saas:

- Regio: half-hourly service between Zermatt and Visp, with every other train continuing from Visp to Fiesch.

== Film ==
Stalden-Saas railway station appears in the 1979 Charles Bronson action film Love and Bullets. Bronson (as character Charlie Congers) and Jill Ireland (Jackie Pruit) disembark from a train and begin driving toward Kandersteg from the station carpark.
