= Bitsch railway station =

Railway station in Bitsch, Switzerland

Bitsch
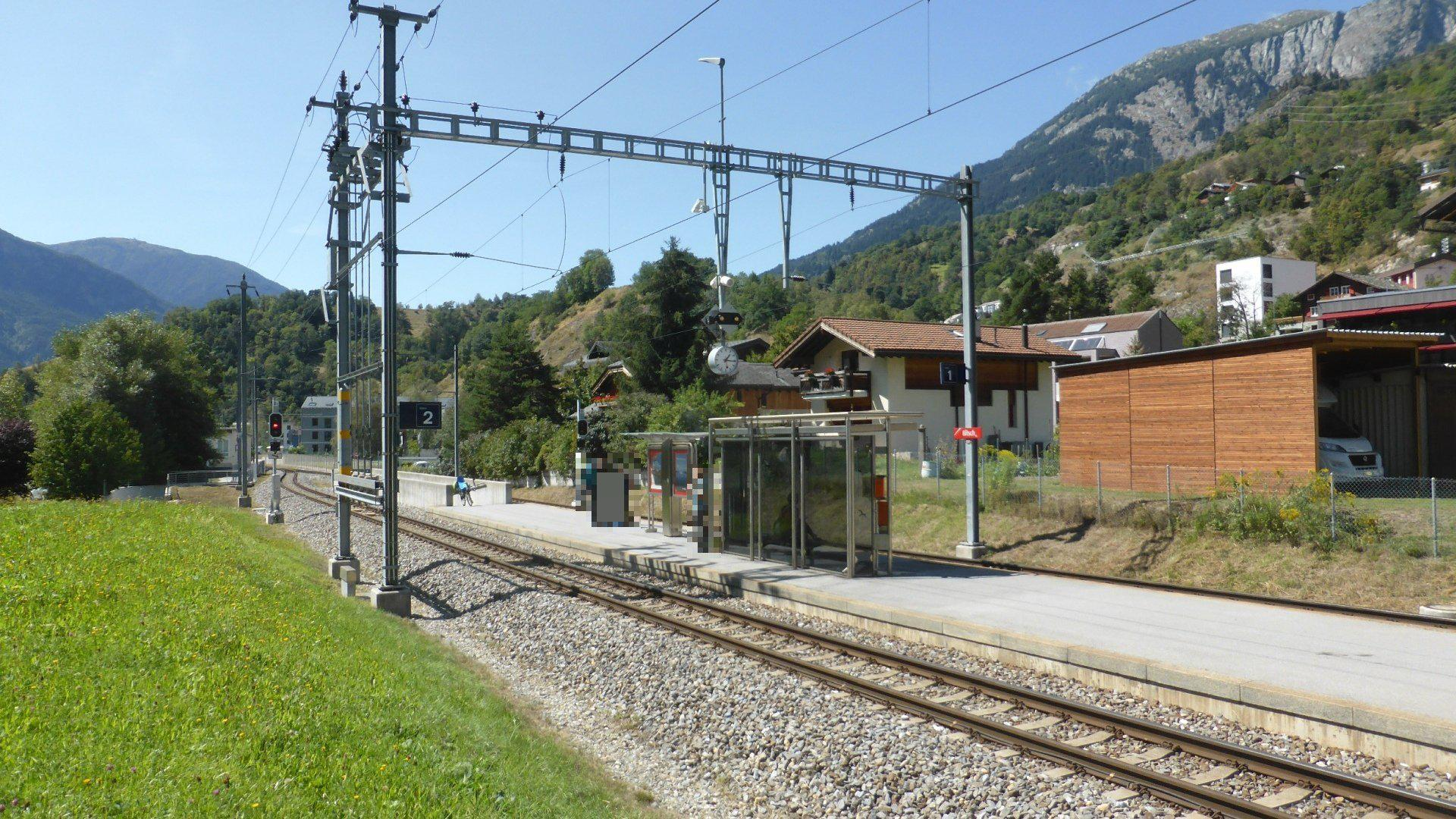
- The station platform in 2018

General information
- Location: Bitsch; Switzerland
- Coordinates: 46°20′10″N 8°01′01″E
- Elevation: 696 m (2,283 ft)
- Owner: Matterhorn Gotthard Bahn
- Line: Furka Oberalp line
- Distance: 3.85 km (2.39 mi) from Brig Bahnhofplatz
- Platforms: 2 (1 island platform)
- Tracks: 2
- Train operators: Matterhorn Gotthard Bahn
- Connections: PostAuto AG bus line; Local bus line

Construction
- Accessible: Yes

Other information
- Station code: 8501677 (BITS)

Passengers
- 2023: 340 per weekday (MGB)

Services
Preceding station	Matterhorn Gotthard Bahn	Following station
Brig Bahnhofplatz towards Zermatt	RE 42	Mörel towards Fiesch
Brig Bahnhofplatz towards Visp	R 43	Mörel towards Andermatt
Location

Bitsch railway station (German: Bahnhof Bitsch) is a station in the municipality of Bitsch, in the Swiss canton of Valais. It is an intermediate and request stop on the 1,000 mm (3 ft 3 3/8 in) metre gauge Furka Oberalp line of the Matterhorn Gotthard Bahn, served by local trains only.

== Services ==
As of the December 2023 timetable change, the following services stop at Bitsch:

- Regio: hourly service between Visp and Andermatt.
- RegioExpress: hourly service between Zermatt and Fiesch.
