= St. Niklaus VS railway station =

Railway station in St. Niklaus, Switzerland

St. Niklaus VS
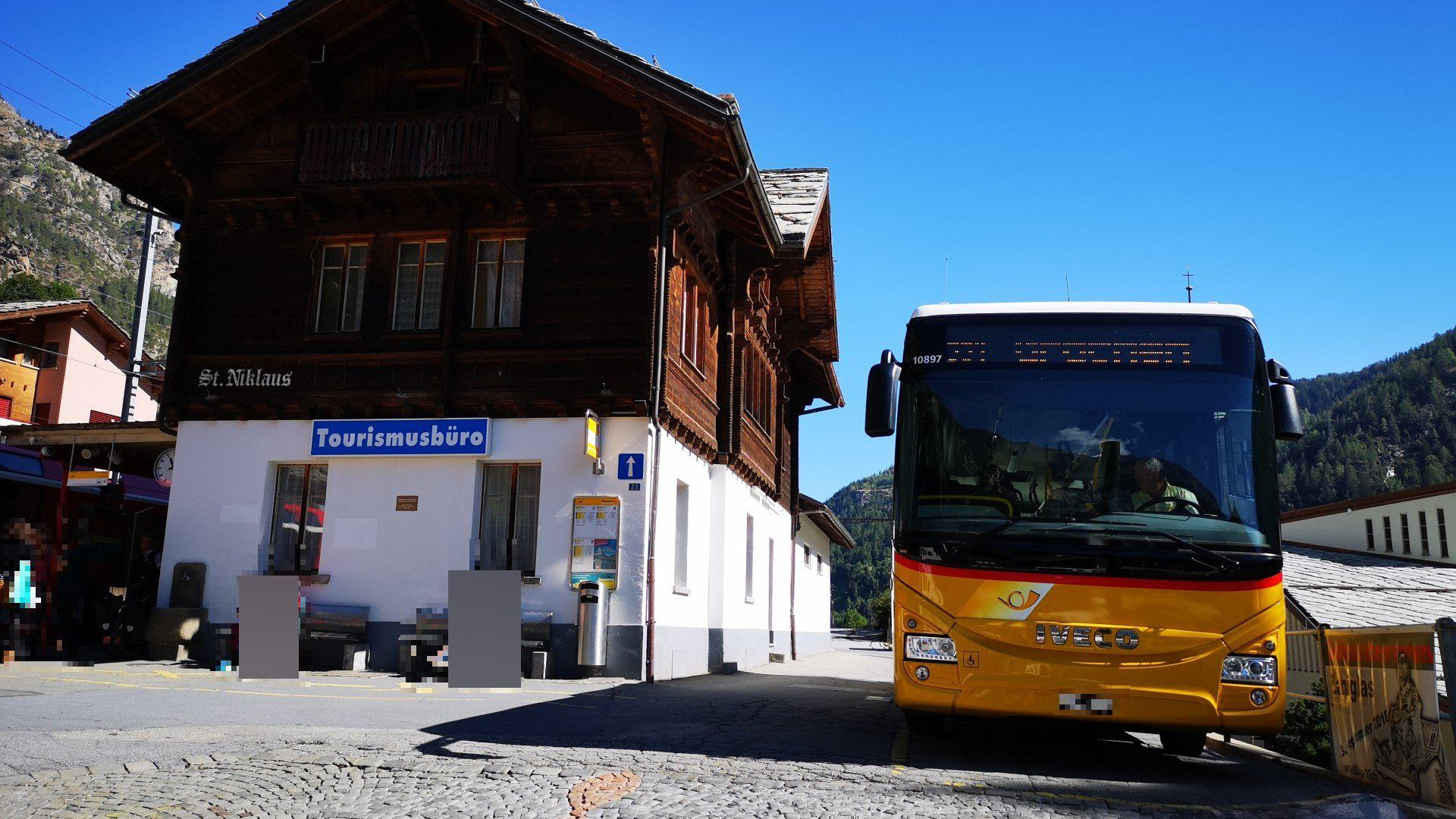
- The station building in 2018

General information
- Location: St. Niklaus; Switzerland
- Coordinates: 46°10′37″N 7°48′07″E
- Elevation: 1,127 m (3,698 ft)
- Owner: Matterhorn Gotthard Bahn
- Line: Brig–Zermatt line
- Distance: 19.01 km (11.81 mi) from Zermatt
- Platforms: 2: 1 side platform; 1 island platform
- Tracks: 3
- Train operators: Matterhorn Gotthard Bahn
- Connections: PostAuto AG buses

Construction
- Accessible: No

Other information
- Station code: 8501685 (SNK)

History
- Former names: St. Niklaus (until 2020)

Passengers
- 2023: 1'200 per weekday (MGB)

Services
Preceding station	Matterhorn Gotthard Bahn	Following station
Herbriggen towards Zermatt	RE 41	Kalpetran towards Visp
Herbriggen towards Zermatt	RE 42	Kalpetran towards Fiesch
Location

St. Niklaus VS railway station (German: Bahnhof St. Niklaus VS, French: Gare de St. Niklaus VS) is a railway station in the municipality of St. Niklaus, in the Swiss canton of Valais. It is an intermediate stop on the 1,000 mm (3 ft 3 3/8 in) metre gauge Brig–Zermatt line and is served by local trains only.

== Services ==
As of the December 2023 timetable change, the following services stop at St. Niklaus VS:

- Regio: half-hourly service between Zermatt and Visp, with every other train continuing from Visp to Fiesch.
