= Herbriggen railway station =

Railway station in St. Niklaus, Switzerland

Herbriggen
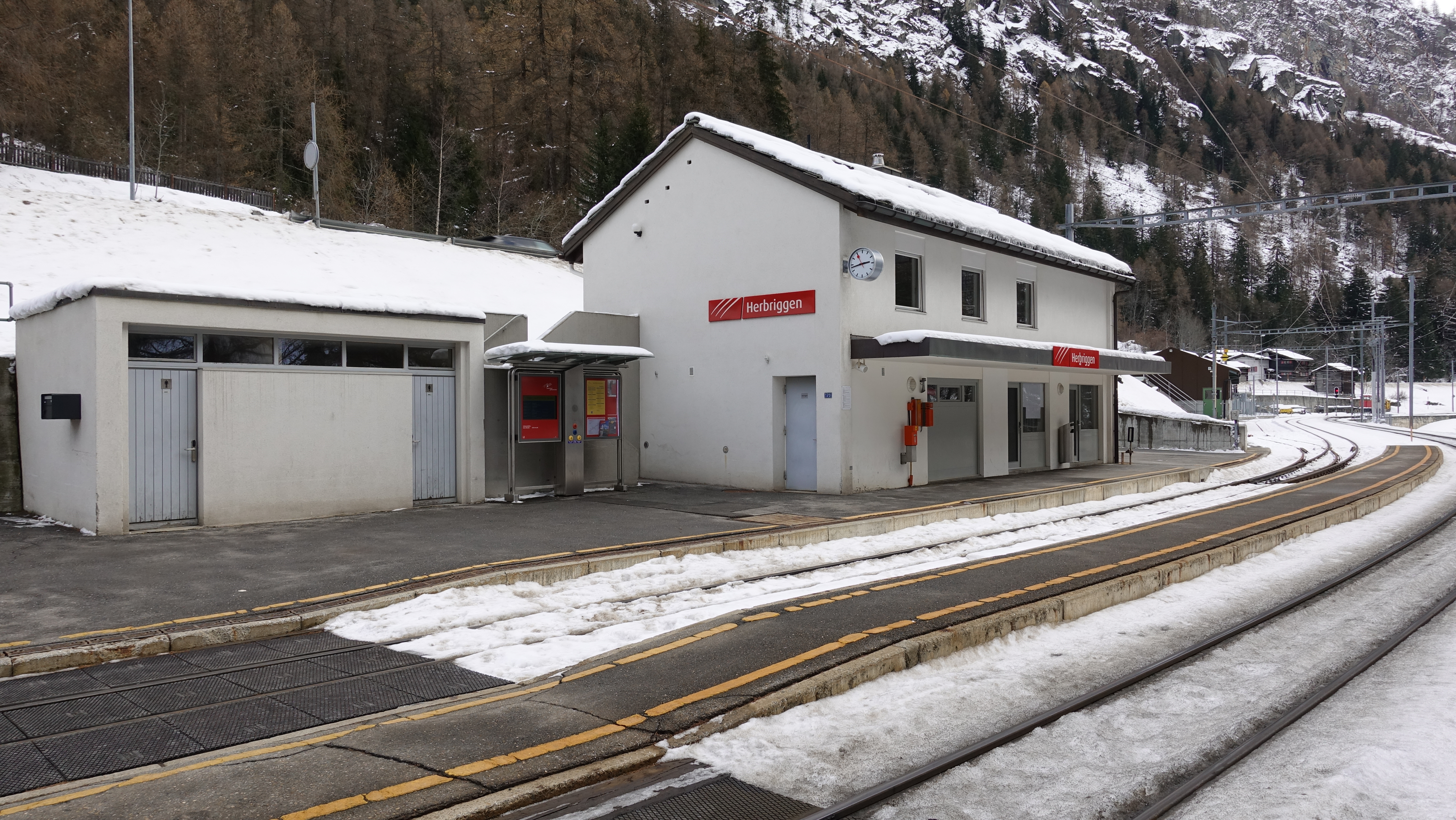
- The station building in 2017

General information
- Location: St. Niklaus; Switzerland
- Coordinates: 46°07′55″N 7°47′31″E
- Elevation: 1,255 m (4,117 ft)
- Owner: Matterhorn Gotthard Bahn
- Line: Brig–Zermatt line
- Distance: 24.21 km (15.04 mi) from Zermatt
- Platforms: 2: 1 side platform; 1 island platform
- Tracks: 2
- Train operators: Matterhorn Gotthard Bahn
- Connections: PostAuto AG bus line

Construction
- Accessible: No

Other information
- Station code: 8501686 (HEBR)

Passengers
- 2023: 370 per weekday (MGB)

Services
Preceding station	Matterhorn Gotthard Bahn	Following station
Randa towards Zermatt	RE 41	St. Niklaus VS towards Visp
Randa towards Zermatt	RE 42	St. Niklaus VS towards Fiesch
Location

Herbriggen railway station (German: Bahnhof Herbriggen, French: Gare de Herbriggen) is a railway station in the municipality of St. Niklaus, in the Swiss canton of Valais. It is an intermediate stop on the 1,000 mm (3 ft 3 3/8 in) metre gauge Brig–Zermatt line and is served by local trains only. The station is stop on demand, so passengers wishing to embark/disembark must press the stop on demand button on the train or at the station.

== Services ==
As of the December 2023 timetable change, the following services stop at Herbriggen:

- Regio: half-hourly service between Zermatt and Visp, with every other train continuing from Visp to Fiesch.
