= Joseph Biner =

Swiss theologian (1697–1766)

- Born: 16 July 1697; Reckingen-Gluringen, Seven Tithings
- Died: 24 March 1766 (aged 68); Rottenburg

Joseph Biner (16 July 1697 – 24 March 1766) was a Roman Catholic canonist, historian, and theologian. His fame rests principally on his erudition abilities.

== Biography ==
Biner entered the Society of Jesus in 1715 and received the usual training of its members. He was later professor of canon law in the universities of Ingolstadt, Dillingen, and Innsbruck. He entered zealously into all the controversies with the sectaries of his time, especially with the Swiss Protestants. As a consequence, all his works have a polemical tinge.

In 1739, he appeared his Catholische Anmerkung über die neueste uncatholische Controvers-Schreiber, directed against certain opponents in Zurich. This was followed in 1744 by Indifferentismus, a treatise on religious indifference and liberalism in dogmatic teaching. Biner published Heiligkeit der Kirche in 1750, discussing the marks of the "true Church" and giving sketches of eminent Catholics. The best of his polemical works is De Summâ Trinitate, Fide Catholicâ et Hierarchiâ Ecclesiasticâ. It appeared in 1765 and shows him at his best as a theologian and canonist. His last controversial treatise, which appeared the same year and was published like all the others at Vienna, is entitled: Kurzer Begriff der heutigen Glaubenstreitigkeiten. It is an examination and refutation of various Protestant confessions of faith.

Biner's chief work of a purely canonical character is Dissertationes juridicæ de beneficiis ecclesiasticis (Innsbruck, 1746). His masterpiece is the Apparatus erudictionis ad jurisprudentiam ecclesiasticam. The work, despite its title, is not restricted to canon law, but is also historical, polemical, and theological. It was published at Vienna in eight quarto volumes from 1754 to 1766. It is a work of vast erudition and a storehouse of history and canon law. Dividing his material by centuries, Biner treats of the various species of law, of the history of the church councils, of the political and religious vicissitudes of the various nations, of treaties and concordats, etc. Interspersed in the work are many valuable excursuses on Jansenism, Probabilism, Public Penance, Origin of Imperial Electors, etc. However the work is rendered less valuable for students by a nonsystematic arrangement of material and the want of an index. The vastness of the knowledge which Biner displays, however, has received praise even from his opponents. He wrote many other works besides those mentioned, which may be found in De Backer and Sommervogel, cited below.

== Bibliography ==
- Hurter, Hugo von, Nomenclator (Innsbruck, 1895), III
- de Backer, Augustin, Le bibliothèque des écrivains de la compagnie de Jésus (Liege, 1853)
- Sommervogel, Carlos, Bibliothèque de la Compagnie de Jesus (Brussels, 1890)
