= Biel, Valais =

Biel
- Former municipality
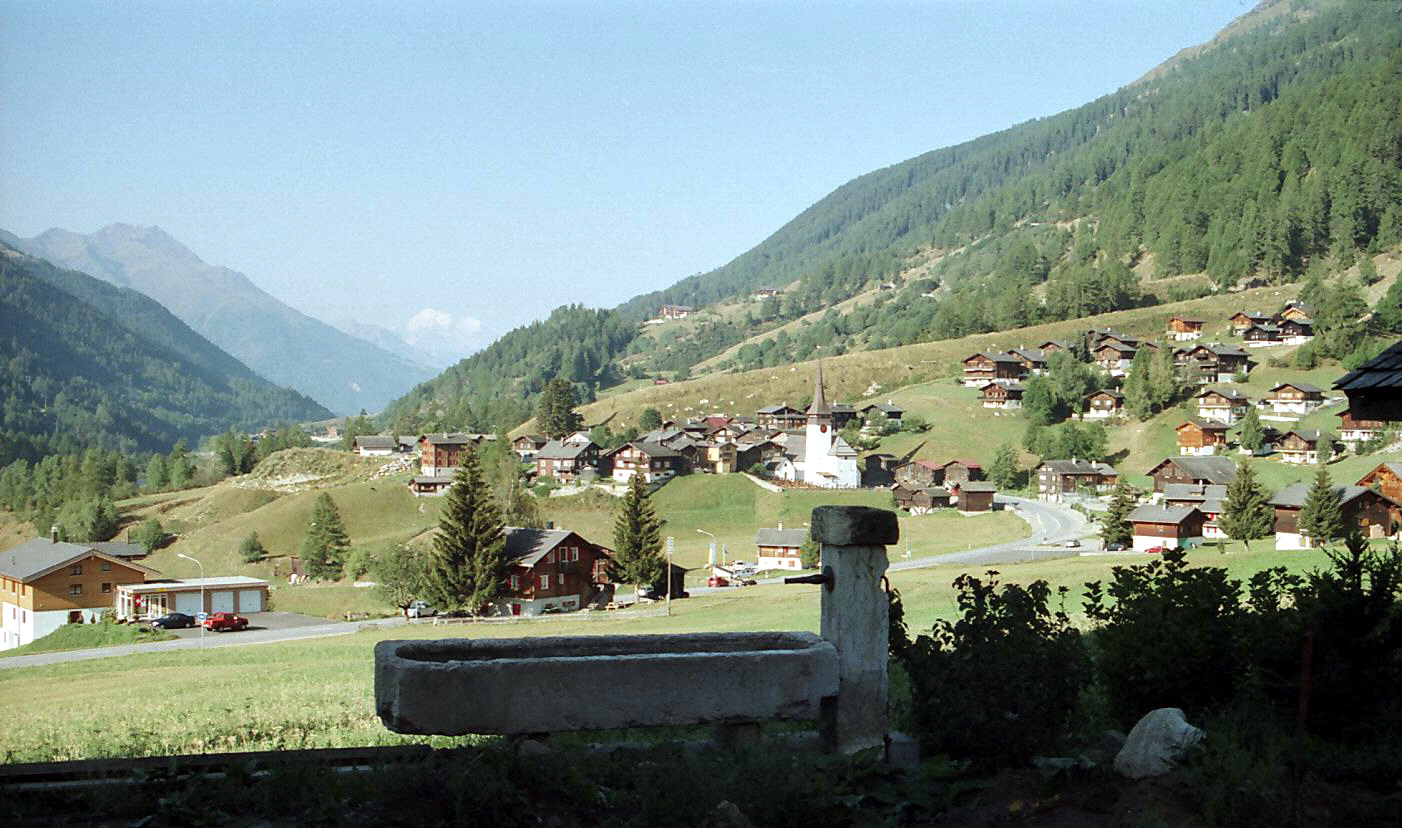

- Flag Coat of arms
- Location of Biel
- Location within Switzerland Location within Canton of Valais
- Coordinates: 46°27′22″N 8°12′58″E
- Country: Switzerland
- Canton: Valais
- District: Goms

Area
  - Total: 7.22 km^{2} (2.79 sq mi)
- Elevation: 1,312 m (4,304 ft)

Population (1990)
  - Total: 58
  - Density: 8.0/km^{2} (21/sq mi)
- Time zone: UTC+01:00 (CET)
  - Summer (DST): UTC+02:00 (CEST)
- Postal code: 3989
- SFOS number: 6053
- ISO 3166 code: CH-VS
- Surrounded by: Ernen, Fieschertal, Gluringen, Mühlebach, Ritzingen, Selkingen
- Website

Biel is a village in the canton of Valais, Switzerland. It was an independent municipality until 2001, when it merged with Ritzingen and Selkingen into the municipality Grafschaft.
