= Byner =

Byner is a surname. Notable people with the surname include:

- Earnest Byner (born 1962), American football player
- John Byner (born 1938), American actor, comedian, and impressionist
- Leon Byner (born 1948), Australian broadcaster
