= Münster, Valais =

Swiss village

Coordinates: 46.4869°N 8.2636°E

Münster (Swiss Standard German pronunciation: [ˈmʏnstər]) is a village situated in the municipality of Goms, Canton of Valais in Switzerland, at the river Rhône or Rotten.

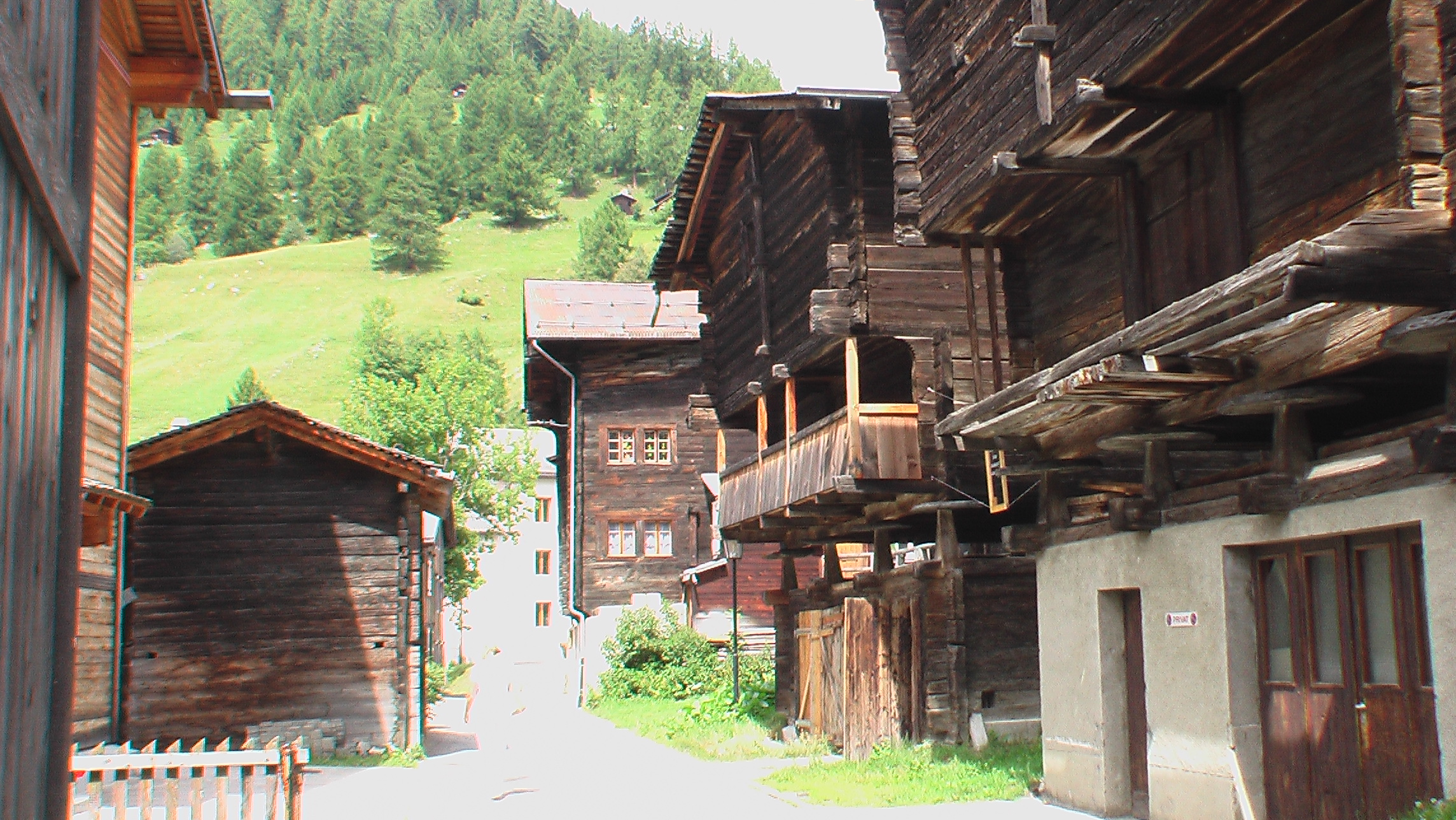

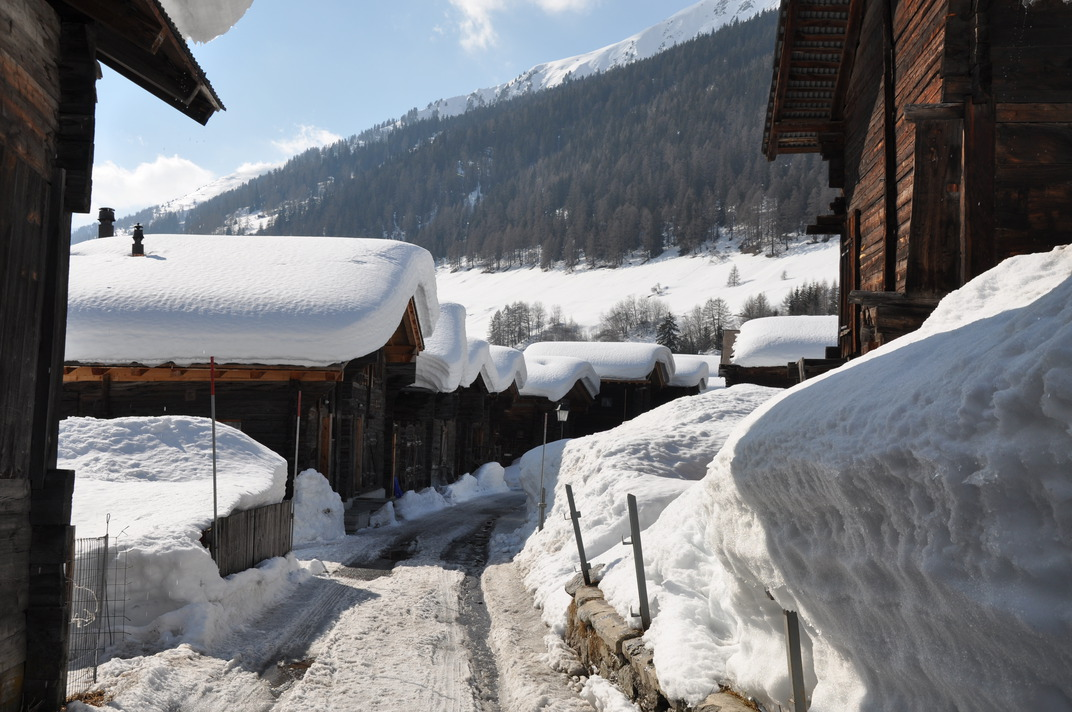

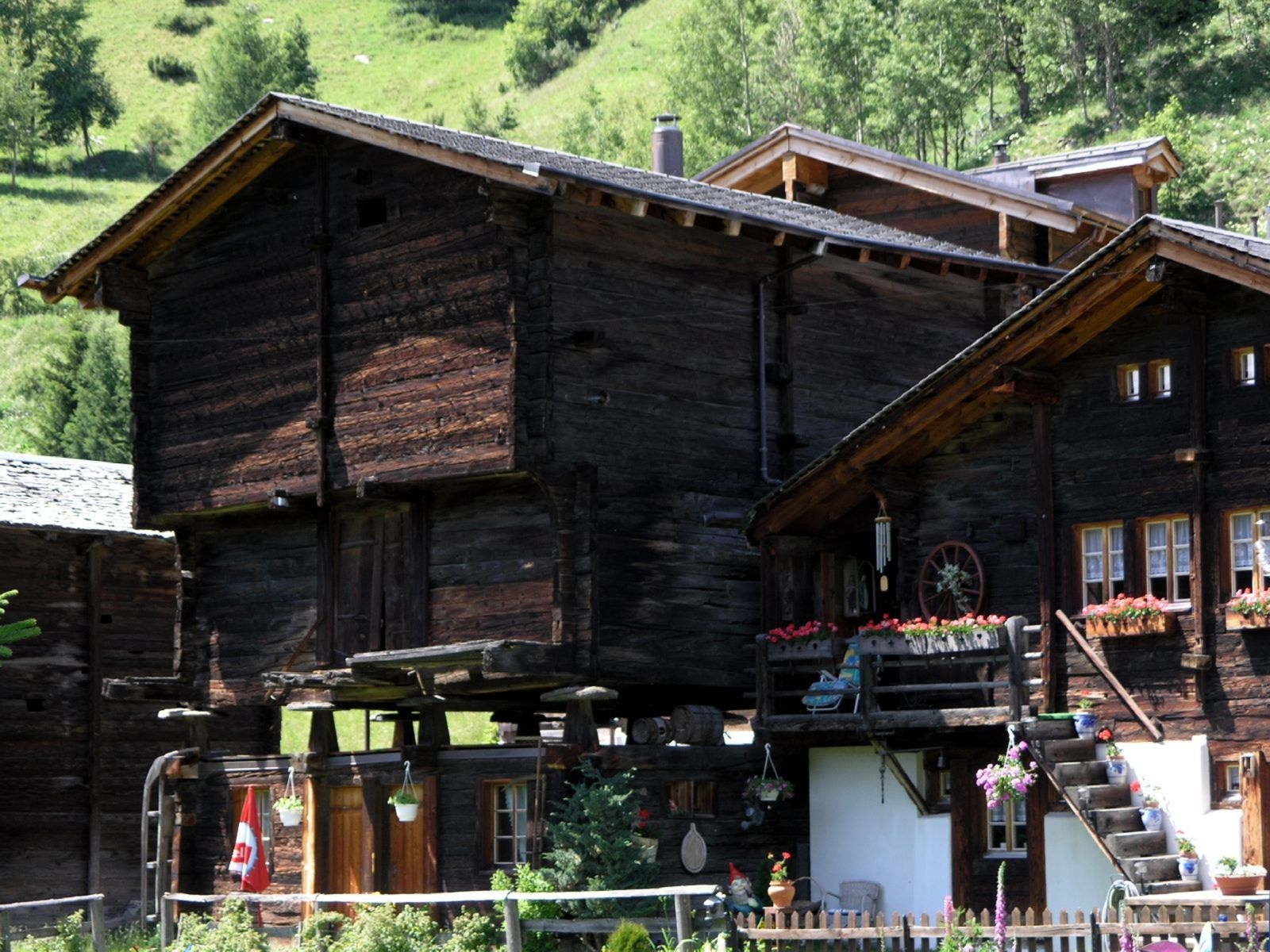

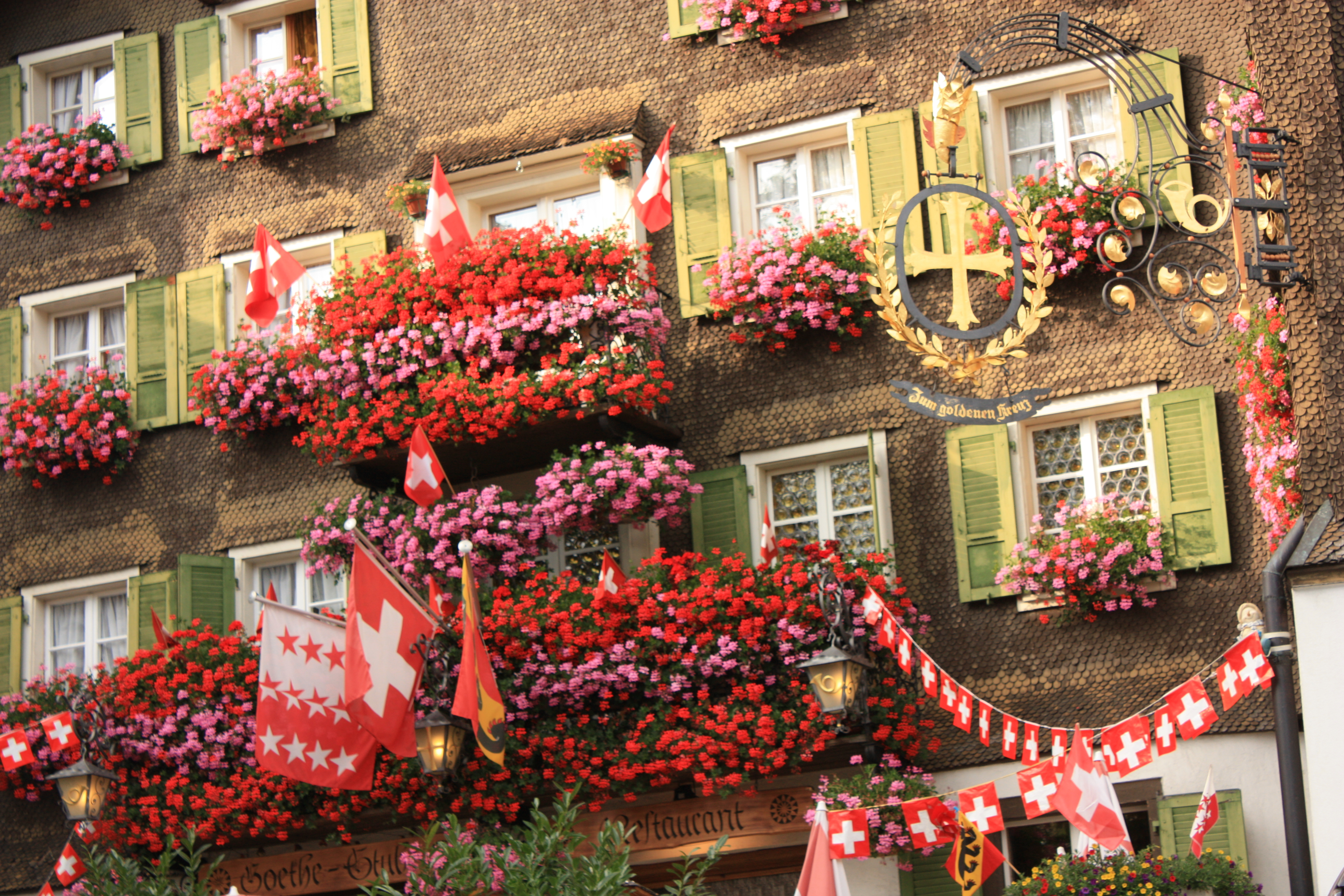
