= Goms, Valais =

Goms
- Municipality
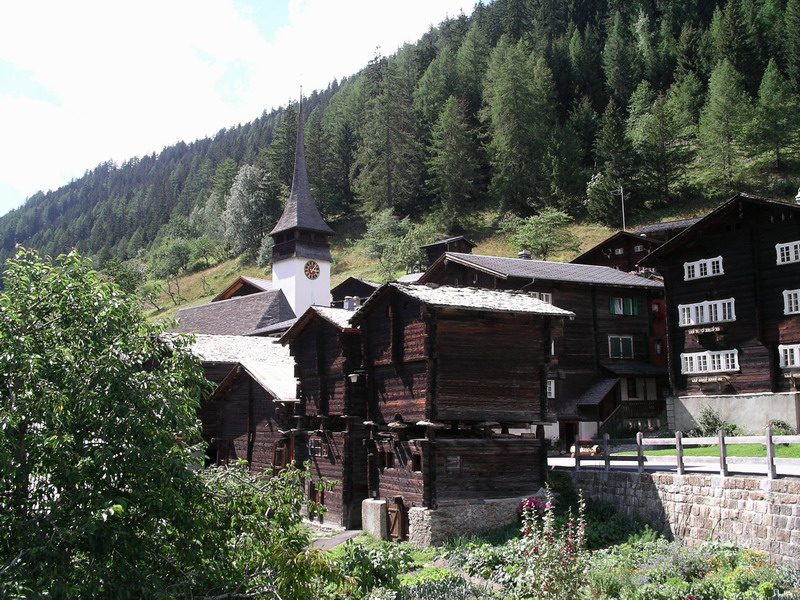
- Niederwald village in Goms

- Flag Coat of arms
- Location of Goms
- Location within Switzerland Location within Canton of Valais
- Coordinates: 46°27′N 8°13′E
- Country: Switzerland
- Canton: Valais
- District: Goms

Area
  - Total: 128.94 km^{2} (49.78 sq mi)
- Elevation: 1,251 m (4,104 ft)

Population (December 2015)
  - Total: 1,203
  - Density: 9.330/km^{2} (24.16/sq mi)
- Time zone: UTC+01:00 (CET)
  - Summer (DST): UTC+02:00 (CEST)
- Postal codes: 3985, 3989, 3998
- SFOS number: 6077
- ISO 3166 code: CH-VS
- Surrounded by: Bellwald, Binn, Ernen, Fieschertal, Formazza (IT), Guttannen (BE), Obergoms
- Website: https://www.gemeinde-goms.ch SFSO statistics

Goms is a municipality in the district of Goms in the canton of Valais in Switzerland. On 1 January 2017, the former municipalities of Niederwald, Blitzingen, Grafschaft, Münster-Geschinen and Reckingen-Gluringen merged into the new municipality of Goms.

== History ==
=== Blitzingen ===
Blitzingen is first mentioned in 1203 as Blicingen.

=== Grafschaft ===
Grafschaft was created in 2000 through the merger of Biel (VS), Ritzingen and Selkingen. Biel was first mentioned in 1277 as Buele. Starting in the 13th Century, Ritzingen gradually became a municipality. By the 16th Century the traditional practices and pastures of the farmers were finally codified into laws. Selkingen was first mentioned in 1374 as villa de Selgingen.

=== Münster-Geschinen ===
Münster-Geschinen was formed in 2004 from the union of the municipalities of Münster and Geschinen. Münster is first mentioned in 1221 as Musterium. Geschinen is first mentioned in 1327 as Gessinon.

=== Niederwald ===
Niederwald is first mentioned in 1526 as Zniderwaldt.

=== Reckingen-Gluringen ===
Reckingen-Gluringen was formed in 2004 from the union of the municipalities of Reckingen and Gluringen. Reckingen is first mentioned in 1225 as Requinguen. Gluringen is first mentioned in 1203 as Gluringen.

== Geography ==
Aerial view from 4600 m by Walter Mittelholzer (1934)

Goms has an area, as of 2009, of 129.59 km^{2} (50.03 sq mi).

== Population ==
The new municipality has a population (as of December 2020) of 1,160.

== Historic population ==
The historical population is given in the following chart:

== Heritage sites of national significance ==
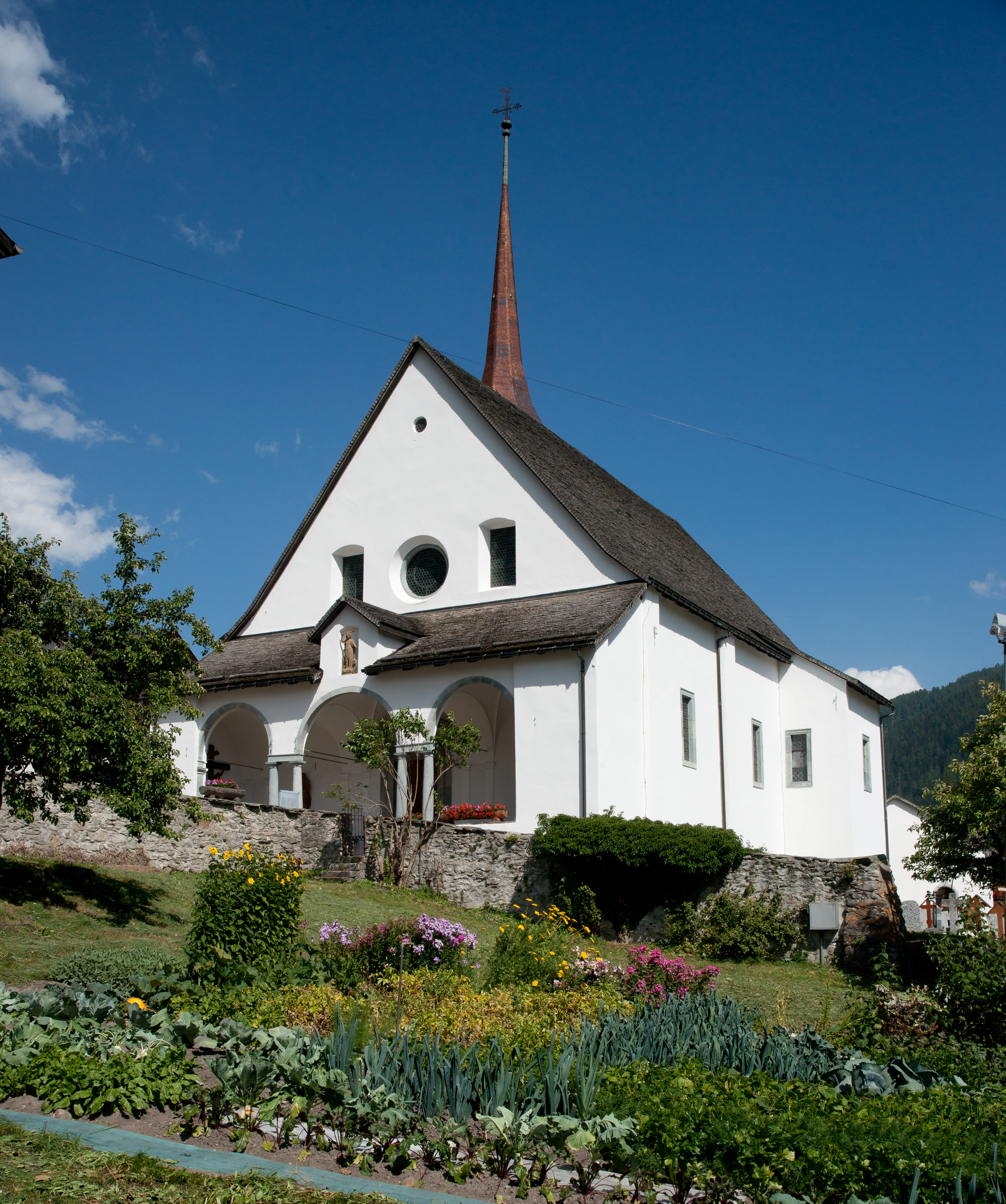
Church of St. Maria

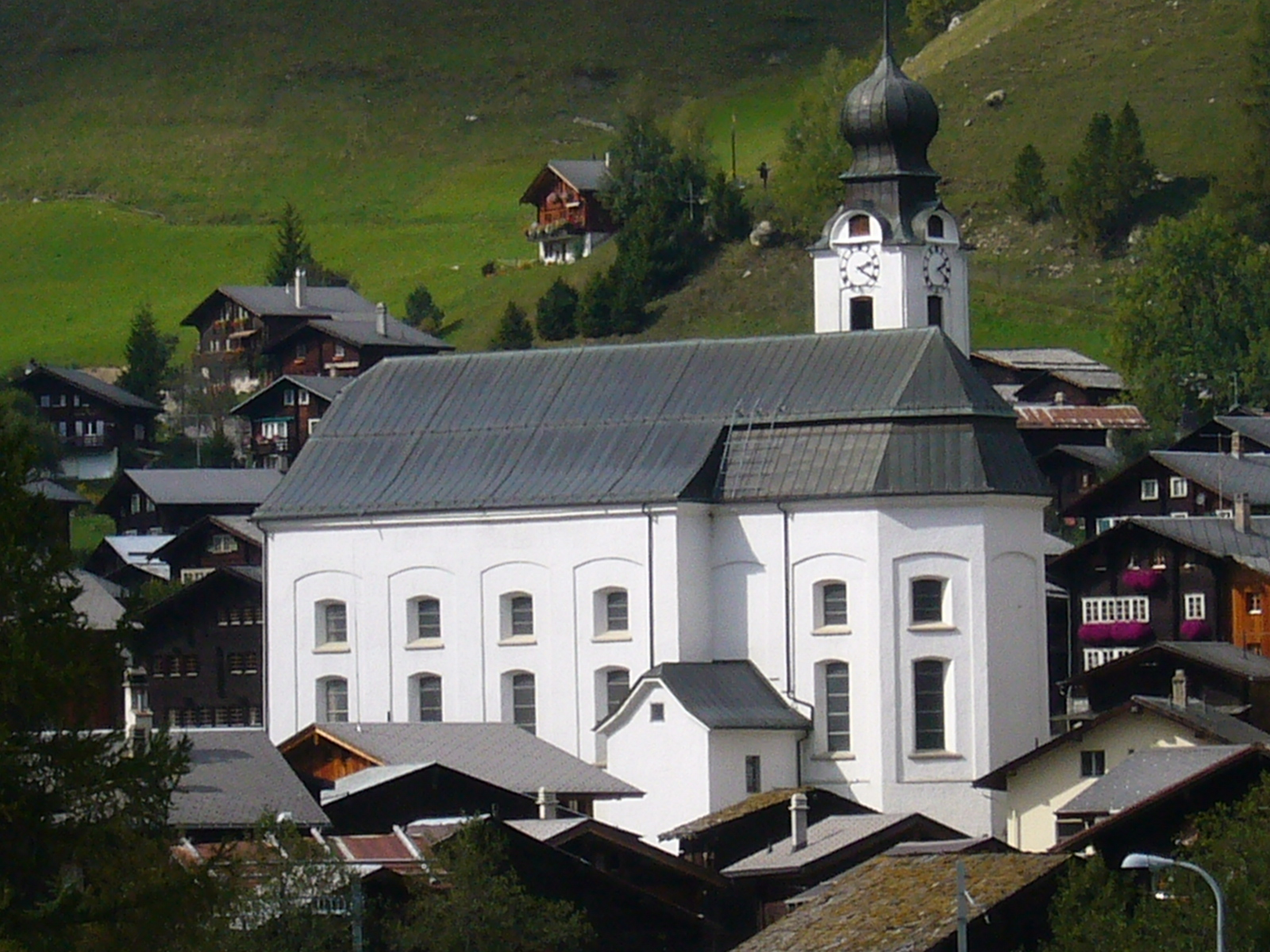
Church of Mariä Geburt

The Church of St. Maria with Cemetery Chapel in Munster and the Church of Mariä Geburt in Reckingen-Gluringen are listed as a Swiss heritage site of national significance. The entire villages of Münster and Geschinen are both part of the Inventory of Swiss Heritage Sites. The villages of Biel, Ritzingen, Selkingen, Niederwald, Gluringen and Reckingen along with the entire hamlets of Ammere / Gadme / Wiler and Bodmen are designated as part of the Inventory of Swiss Heritage Sites.

== Notable residents ==
Niederwald was home to famous hotelier César Ritz, who is buried in the local cemetery.
