= Brig Bahnhofplatz railway station =

Railway station in Brig-Glis in the Swiss canton of Valais

Brig Bahnhofplatz
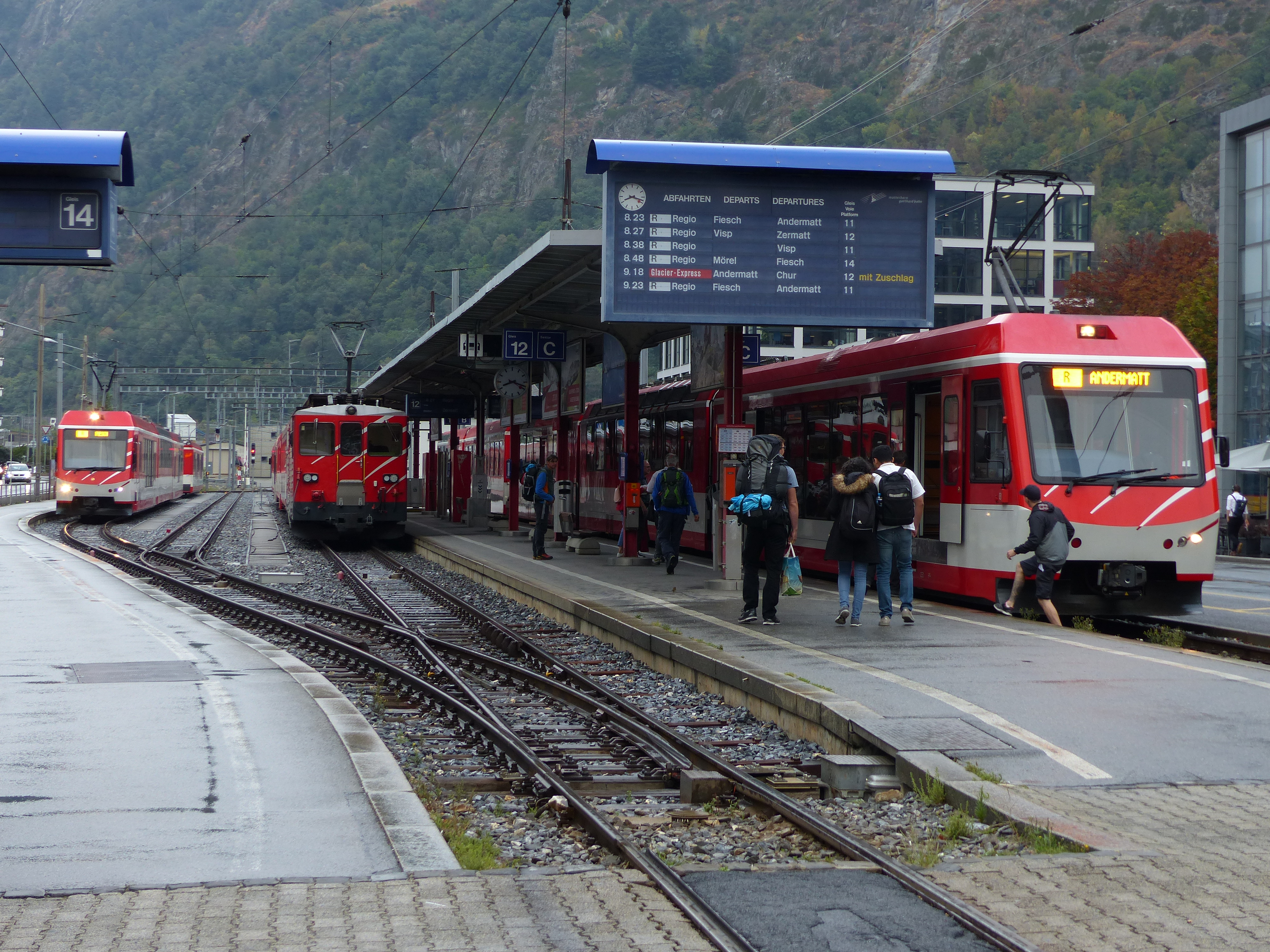
- Matterhorn Gotthard Bahn trains at the station in 2018

General information
- Location: Brig-Glis; Switzerland
- Coordinates: 46°19′08″N 7°59′10″E
- Elevation: 672 m (2,205 ft)
- Owner: Matterhorn Gotthard Bahn
- Lines: Brig–Zermatt line; Furka Oberalp Railway
- Platforms: 3; 1 island platform; 1 side platform
- Tracks: 4
- Train operators: Matterhorn Gotthard Bahn
- Connections: PostAuto AG buses; Local buses

Construction
- Parking: 55
- Cycle facilities: 330
- Accessible: No

Other information
- Station code: 8515296 (BRMG)

Passengers
- 2023: 20'700 per weekday (BLS, MGB, RegionAlps, SBB)

Services
Preceding station	Glacier Express	Following station
Zermatt Terminus	Glacier Express	Andermatt towards St. Moritz
Preceding station	Matterhorn Gotthard Bahn	Following station
Eyholz towards Zermatt	RE 42	Bitsch towards Fiesch
Eyholz towards Visp	R 43	Bitsch towards Andermatt
Location
- Location within Switzerland Location within Canton of Valais

Brig Bahnhofplatz railway station (German: Bahnhof Brig Bahnhofplatz) is a railway station in the municipality of Brig-Glis, in the Swiss canton of Valais. It is the meeting point of two 1,000 mm (3 ft 3 3/8 in) metre gauge railway lines of the Matterhorn Gotthard Bahn, the BVZ Zermatt-Bahn and the Furka Oberalp Railway. Services at the station include the famed Glacier Express. The station is physically adjacent to the standard gauge Brig railway station, served by BLS AG and Swiss Federal Railways.

== Services ==
As of the December 2023 timetable change, the following services stop at Brig Bahnhofplatz:

- Glacier Express: one or more trains per day, depending on the season, between Zermatt and St. Moritz or Chur.
- Regio: hourly service between Visp and Andermatt.
- RegioExpress: hourly service between Zermatt and Fiesch.
