= Furka–Oberalp-Bahn Deh 4/4 II =

Furka–Oberalp Railway Deh 4/4 II Matterhorn–Gotthard Railway Deh 4/4 91–96
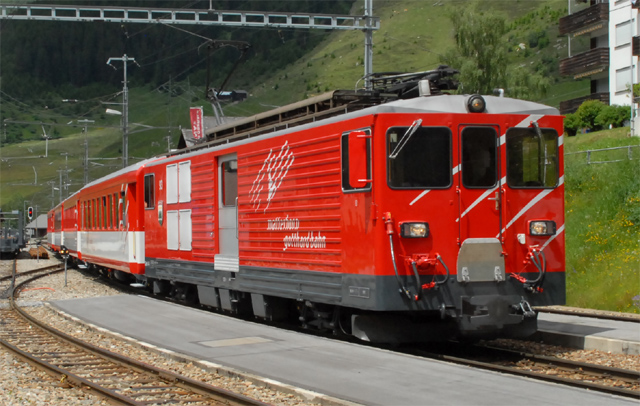
- Deh 4/4 No. 93 in MGB livery at Sedrun, 2009.
- Manufacturer: SLM (bodies and mechanical equipment); BBC (electrical equipment)
- Constructed: 1979/1984
- Entered service: 1979/1984
- Number built: 6
- Number in service: 6
- Fleet numbers: 91–96
- Operators: Furka Oberalp Bahn (1979–2002); Matterhorn Gotthard Bahn (since 2003)

Specifications
- Train length: 15,500 mm (50 ft 10 in)
- Maximum speed: Adhesion: 60 km/h (37 mph); Rack rail: 30 km/h (19 mph)
- Weight: 48.3 tonnes (106,500 lb)
- Power output: 1,032 kW (1,380 hp)
- Electric system(s): 11 kV 16.7 Hz
- Current collector(s): Overhead
- UIC classification: Bo'Bo'
- Track gauge: 1,000 mm (3 ft 3 3/8 in)

The Furka–Oberalp Railway Deh 4/4 II, now known as the Matterhorn–Gotthard Railway Deh 4/4 91–96, is a class of metre gauge, rack rail, electric multiple unit power cars operated until 2002 by the Furka Oberalp Railway (FO), and since then by its successor, the Matterhorn–Gotthard Railway (MGB), in the Canton of Valais, Switzerland.

The class is so named under the Swiss locomotive and railcar classification system. According to that system, Deh 4/4 denotes an electric railcar with a baggage compartment, and a total of four axles, all of which are drive axles fitted with cogwheels for rack rail operation.

There are six members in the class. They are electrically identical to the Furka–Oberalp-Bahn Deh 4/4 I. All are still in service.

== Introduction of the class ==
As the FO had had good experiences with its Deh 4/4 I class, it was decided to procure the Deh 4/4 II as its successor. However, the FO Deh 4/4 II was constructed with a completely different body, which is why FO gave the later vehicles a different class identifier. The first four members of the class entered the FO fleet in 1979, and the final two members in 1984.

Since the merger between the FO and the BVZ to create the MGB, the Deh 4/4 II identifier has fallen into disuse; the MGB distinguishes the two series by their numbers, beginning with 51 and 91, respectively.

== Technical details ==
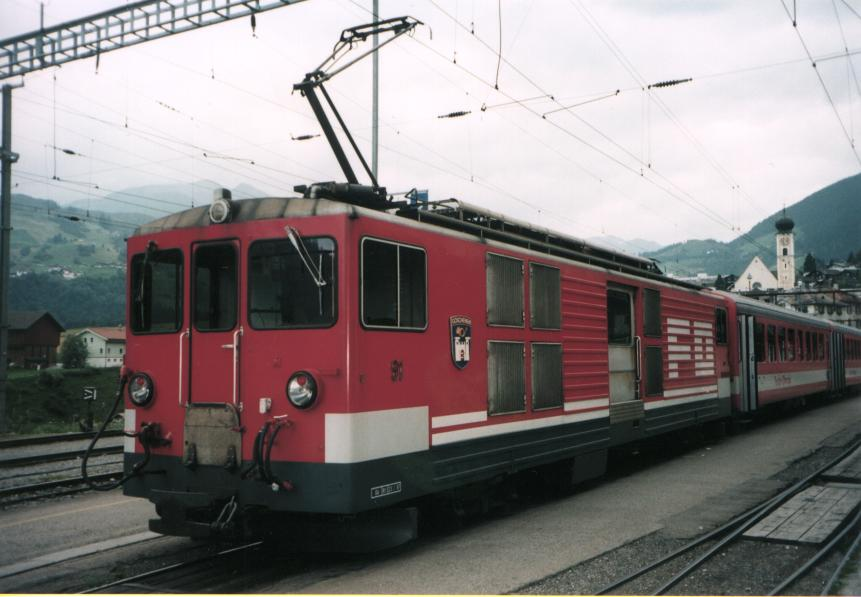
Deh 4/4 II No 91 in FO livery.

The performance of the Deh 4/4 I class had been affected by minor problems with its aluminium bodies. The bodies of the Deh 4/4 II class were therefore constructed in lightweight steel with beading.

The bodies are also shorter to save weight, and the view from the driver's cab is better. The bogies are interchangeable with those of the Deh 4/4 I.

Each of the bogies is equipped with two traction motors, and with Abt rack system pinion wheels.

To enable continuous operation of the car shuttle trains through the Furka Base Tunnel even in the event of a failure of a Ge 4/4 III class tunnel locomotive, the last two 1979-built Deh 4/4 IIs (numbers 93-94), and also the further two vehicles subsequently delivered in 1984 (numbers 95-96), were all fitted with air brake connections.

However, remote control of the Deh 4/4 IIs from the car shuttle control car is not possible. The car shuttle trains, if operated by the Deh 4/4 II at all, must therefore be composed with one Deh 4/4 II at each end.

As of 1985, the HGe 4/4 II class, which can be remotely controlled from the car shuttle control car, took over the reserve and auxiliary function for car shuttle trains.

== Service history ==
Like the Deh 4/4 I, the Deh 4/4 II is used for push-pull trains, which also consist of two intermediate cars and a control car, on the entire route network of the former FO. One power car, usually No. 95 or 96, serves as a replacement vehicle for the other Dehs, and also operates on its own in moving excess loads.

In past years, the Deh 4/4 II was also used to power goods trains to Göschenen.

== List of vehicles ==
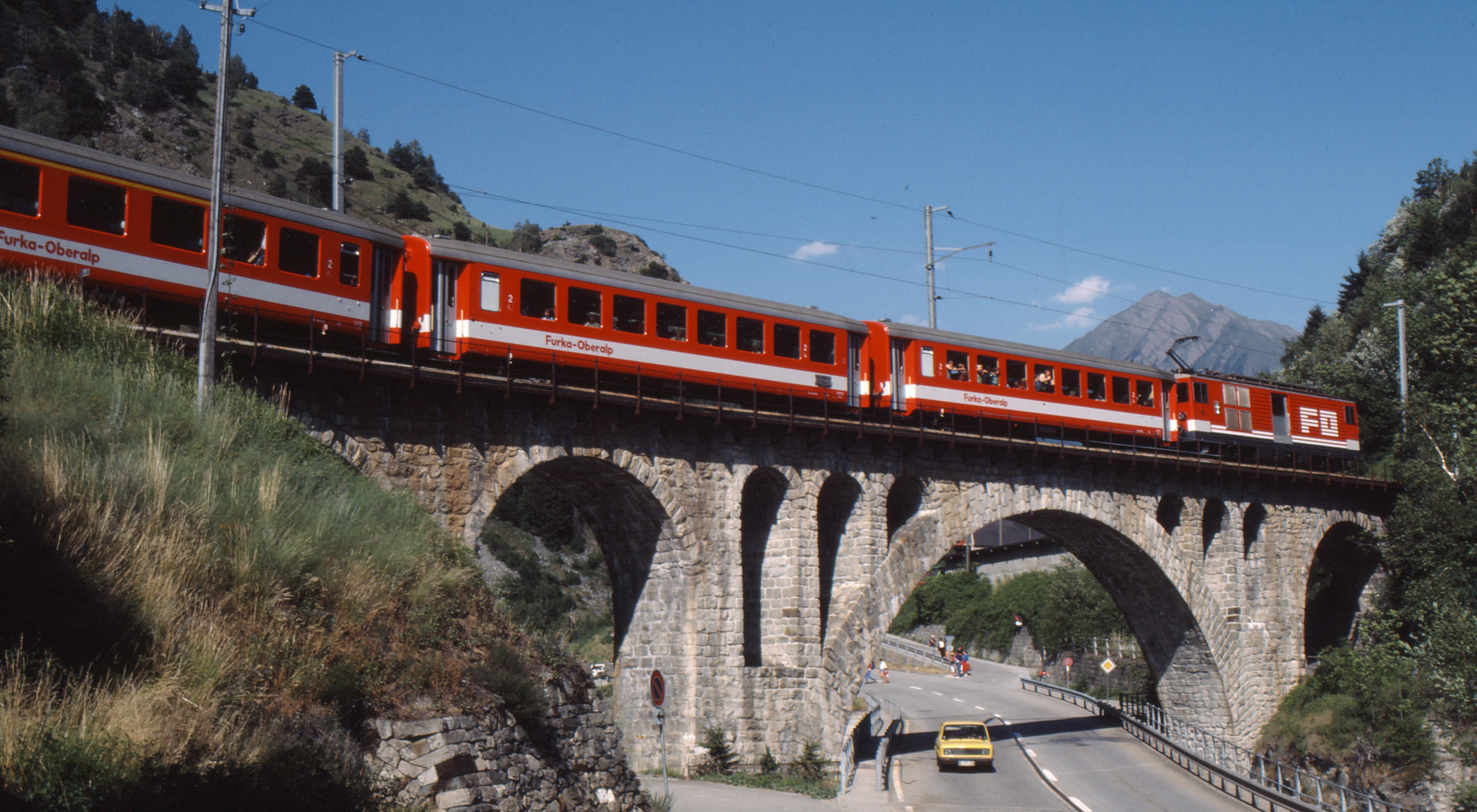
A Deh 4/4 II and FO train at Betten.

Road number	Name	Commissioning	Status
91	Göschenen	1979	in service
92	Realp	1979	in service
93	Oberwald	1979	in service
94	Fiesch	1979	in service
95	Andermatt	1984	in service
96	Münster	1984	in service

== See also ==
- Furka Pass
- Oberalp Pass
- History of rail transport in Switzerland
- Rail transport in Switzerland
