= Brig-Visp-Zermatt-Bahn Deh 4/4 =

Class of power cars

Brig-Visp-Zermatt-Bahn Deh 4/4 Matterhorn Gotthard Bahn Deh 4/4 21–24
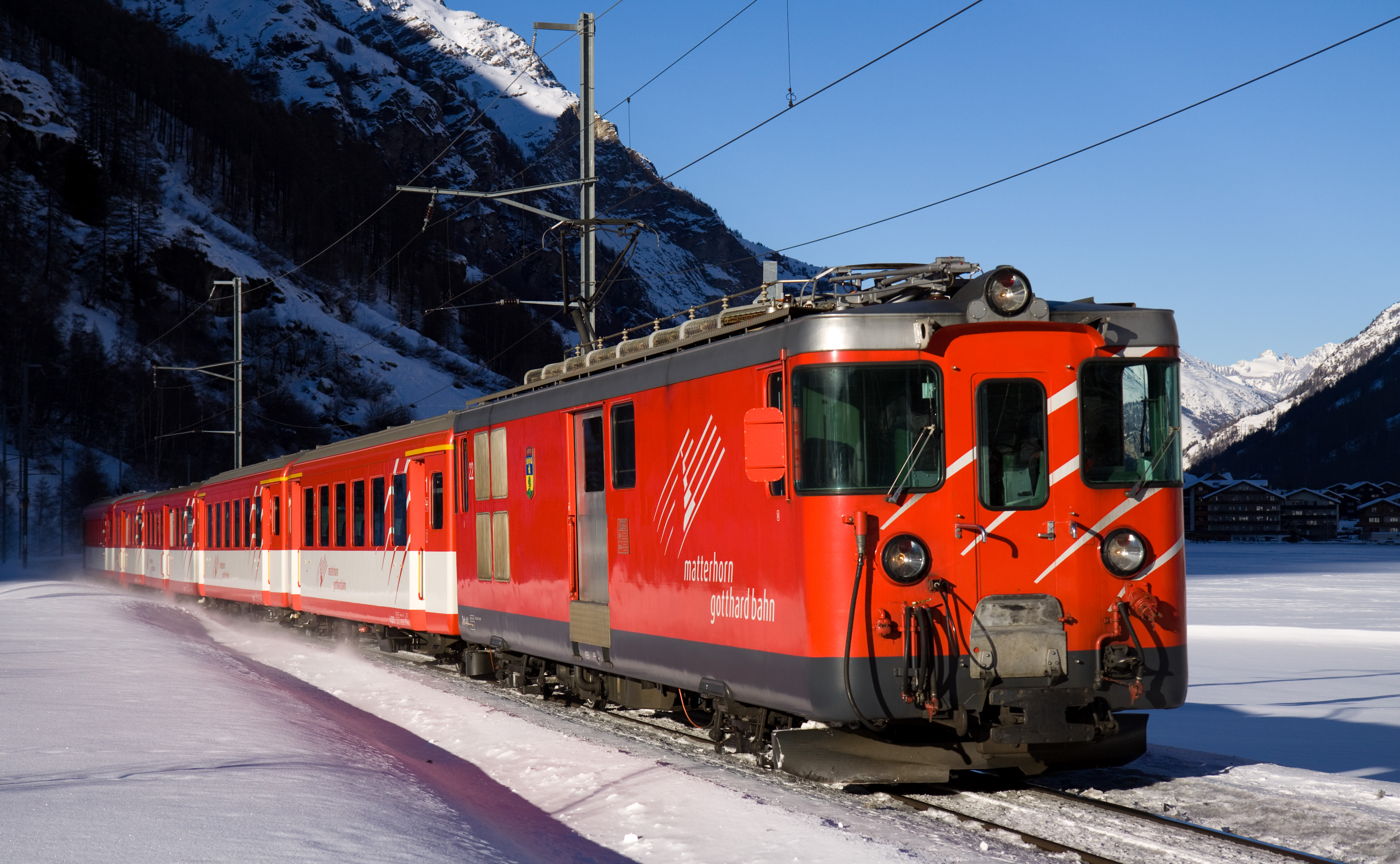
- Deh 4/4 No. 22 near Täsch, 2009.
- Manufacturer: SLM (bogies); SIG (bodies); SAAS (electrical equipment)
- Constructed: 1975–1976
- Entered service: 1975–1976
- Number built: 4
- Number in service: 4
- Fleet numbers: 21–24
- Operators: Brig-Visp-Zermatt-Bahn (1975–2002); Matterhorn Gotthard Bahn (since 2003)

Specifications
- Train length: 16,900 mm (55 ft 5 in)
- Maximum speed: Adhesion: 65 km/h (40 mph); Rack rail: 35 km/h (22 mph)
- Weight: 49 tonnes (108,000 lb)
- Power output: 1,094 kW (1,470 hp)
- Electric system(s): 11 kV 16.7 Hz
- Current collector(s): Overhead
- UIC classification: Bo'Bo'
- Track gauge: 1,000 mm (3 ft 3 3/8 in)

The Brig-Visp-Zermatt-Bahn Deh 4/4, now known as the Matterhorn Gotthard Bahn Deh 4/4 21–24, is a four member class of metre gauge, rack rail, electric multiple unit power cars operated until 2002 by the Brig-Visp-Zermatt-Bahn (BVZ), and since then by its successor, the Matterhorn Gotthard Bahn (MGB), in the Canton of Valais, Switzerland.

The class is so named under the Swiss locomotive and railcar classification system. According to that system, Deh 4/4 denotes an electric railcar with a baggage compartment, and a total of four axles, all of which are drive axles fitted with cogwheels for rack rail operation.

The class entered the BVZ fleet in 1975–1976, and all of its members are still in service. Five mechanically similar vehicles, with different electrical equipment, had already been procured in 1972 by the Furka Oberalp Bahn (FO) as the Deh 4/4 51–55 class; they now similarly form part of the MGB fleet.

== Introduction of the class ==
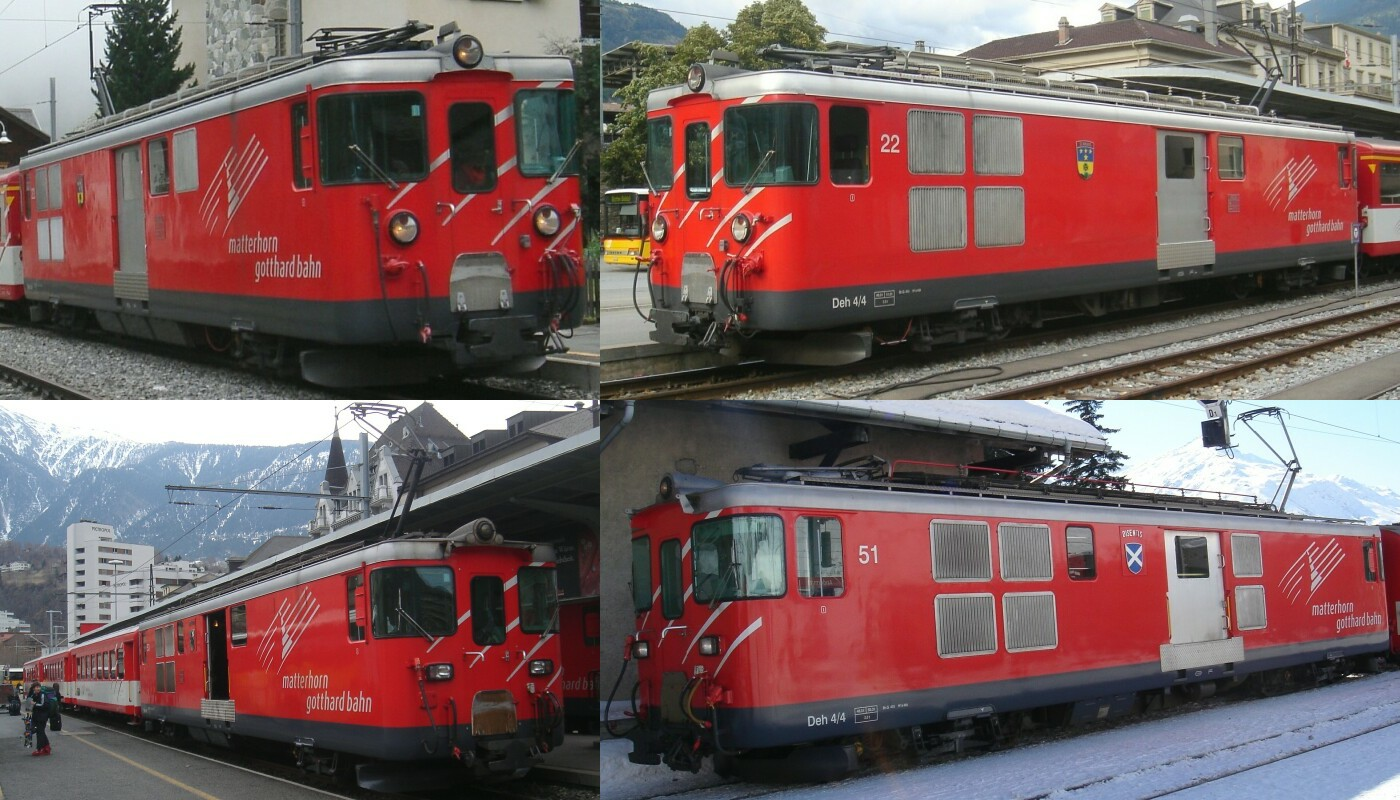
Comparative views of the ex BVZ Deh (above) und the ex FO Deh (below).

Increased traffic on the BVZ in the early 1970s, and especially on the Täsch–Zermatt shuttle, called for an extension of the BVZ motive power fleet, which, at the beginning of the 1970s, comprised only six roughly forty-year-old locomotives and five articulated or two-car train sets.

As the Deh 4/4 concept was well proven on the FO push-pull trains, the BVZ placed an order in 1973 for four train sets, each made up of a power car similar to the FO Deh 4/4 I, intermediate cars, and a control car. The train sets were delivered in 1975 and 1976.

While the mechanical componentry of the Deh 4/4 remained largely unchanged, the electrical equipment installed in the BVZ vehicles was a thyristor phase fired controller unit manufactured by SAAS, and similar to the one fitted to the SBB-CFF-FFS RABDe 8/16 multiple unit trains. This produced increased performance compared with the FO vehicles.

The intermediate and control cars were also of the same type as those of the FO, but longer.

== Technical details ==
The Deh 4/4 vehicles are cab unit locomotives with one cab at each end. For the sake of saving weight, the vehicle body is constructed of lightweight metal.

The equipment cabinets with electronic and pneumatic equipment are housed in the middle of the luggage compartment. The transformer is located under the vehicle. Electrically, the vehicle is equipped with phase control (by thyristor). It has a dynamic brake, but no regenerative braking.

Each of the bogies is equipped with two traction motors, and with Abt rack system pinion wheels.

== Service history ==
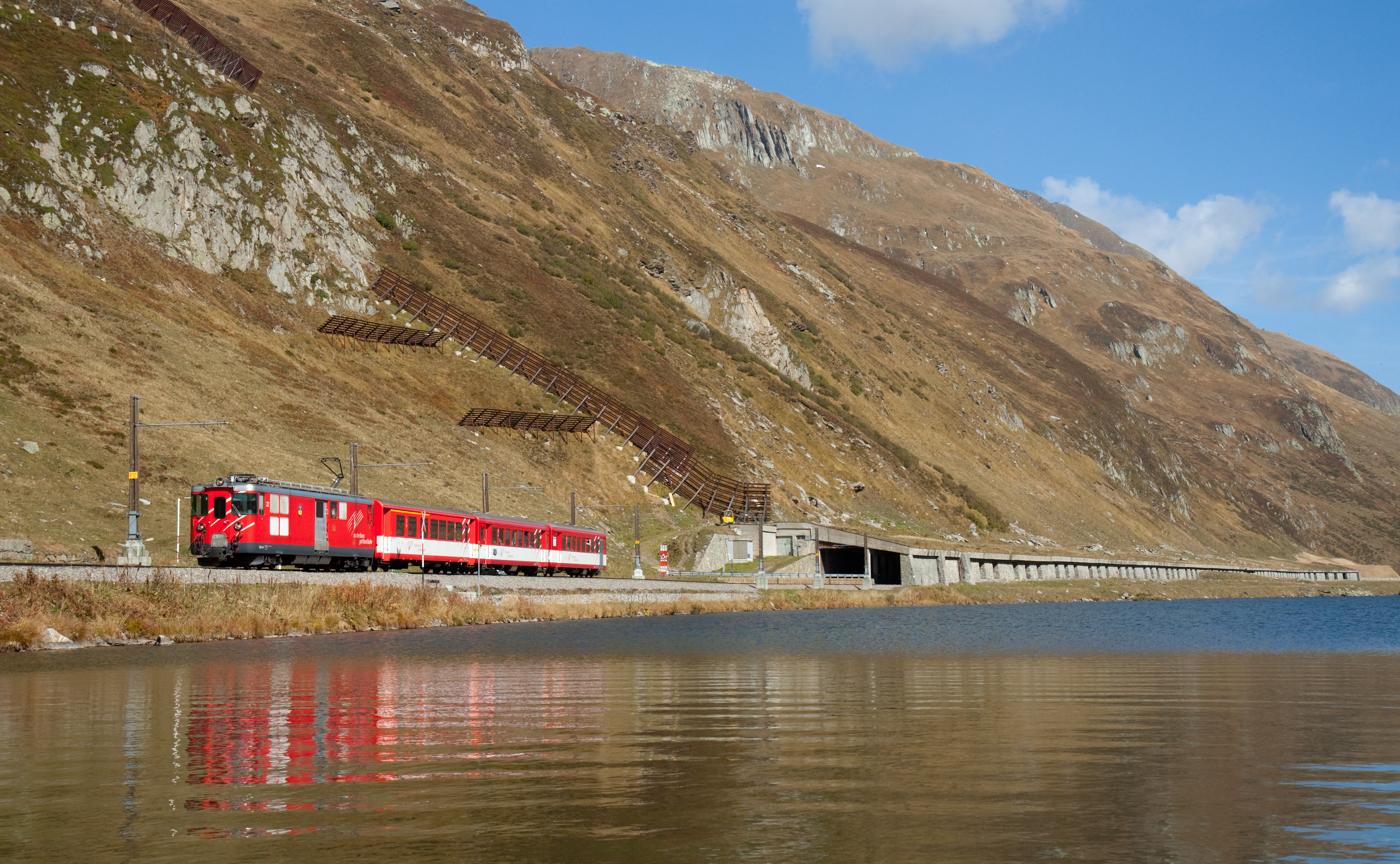
Deh 4/4 No 22 with a push-pull train at Oberalpsee, near the summit of the Oberalp Pass, October 2010.

The former BVZ vehicles are used to power both push-pull trains and locomotive hauled passenger and goods trains between Zermatt and Brig. Since 2006, they have also been in service on the Oberalp Pass, but they lack the brake equipment required for the Schöllenenbahn.

On the line to Zermatt and on the Oberalp, the Deh 4/4s can power five passenger cars. In summer, a whole Oberalp push-pull train is made up of a Deh 4/4 composition, with each vehicle in the train being fitted with the automatic +GF+ (GFN) type coupling.

== List of vehicles ==
Fleet number	Name	Commissioning	Status
21	Stalden	1975	scrapped
22	St. Niklaus	1975	scrapped
23	Randa	1976	in service
24	Täsch	1976	scrapped

== See also ==
- Gornergratbahn
- History of rail transport in Switzerland
- Rail transport in Switzerland
