= Brig-Visp-Zermatt-Bahn ABDeh 8/8 =

Brig-Visp-Zermatt-Bahn ABDeh 8/8 Matterhorn Gotthard Bahn ABDeh 8/8
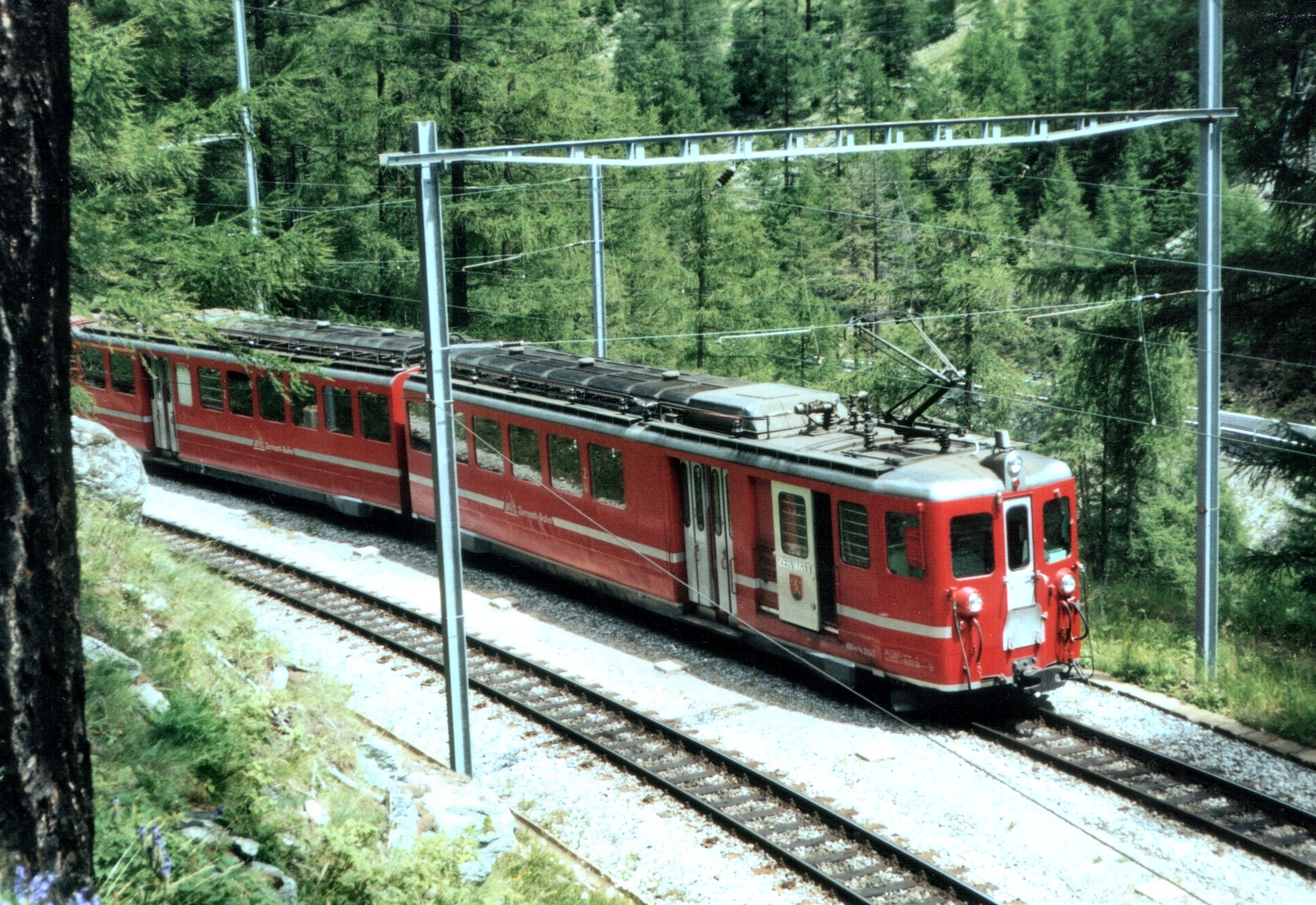
- ABDeh 8/8 No. 2043 at Kalter Boden crossing loop near Zermatt, Summer 2002.
- Manufacturer: SLM, SIG, and SAAS
- Constructed: 1965
- Number built: 3
- Number in service: 0
- Fleet numbers: 2041–2043
- Operators: Brig-Visp-Zermatt-Bahn; Matterhorn Gotthard Bahn

Specifications
- Train length: 35,100 mm (115 ft 2 in)
- Maximum speed: Adhesion: 55 km/h (34 mph); Rack rail: 30 km/h (19 mph)
- Weight: 92 tonnes (202,800 lb)
- Power output: 1,176 kW (1,580 hp)
- Electric system(s): 11 kV 16.7 Hz
- Current collector(s): Overhead
- UIC classification: Bo′Bo′ + Bo′Bo′
- Track gauge: 1,000 mm (3 ft 3 3/8 in)

The Brig-Visp-Zermatt-Bahn ABDeh 8/8, now known as the Matterhorn Gotthard Bahn ABDeh 8/8, is a three member class of metre gauge, rack rail, electric multiple units operated until 2002 by the Brig-Visp-Zermatt-Bahn (BVZ), and since then by its successor, the Matterhorn Gotthard Bahn (MGB), in the Canton of Valais, Switzerland.

The class is so named under the Swiss locomotive and railcar classification system. According to that system, ABDeh 8/8 denotes an electric railcar with first and second class compartments, a baggage compartment, and a total of eight axles, all of which are drive axles fitted with cogwheels for rack rail operation.

The class entered the BVZ fleet in 1965. All of its members were rebuilt in 1985–88, and again in 1999. They are presently used on peak period Zermatt Shuttle trains, and as reserve vehicles.

== The introduction of the class ==
The ABDeh 8/8 class vehicles were procured in 1965, as a follow-up to the two members of the BVZ ABDeh 6/6 class, which had been acquired five years earlier, in response to strong growth in traffic on the BVZ in the late 1950s.

The ABDeh 6/6s had had several advantages compared with the then current HGe 4/4 class electric locomotives, one of which was a higher towing capacity of 125 tonnes (123 long tons; 138 short tons).

== Technical details ==
The three members of the ABDeh 8/8 class have an even higher towing capacity than the ABDeh 6/6s, at 175 tonnes (172 long tons; 193 short tons). They also differ from their predecessors in their body/bogie configuration.

Like the ABDeh 6/6s, each ABDeh 8/8 is made up of a pair of passenger car bodies connected together, but the newer class has an extra intermediate body, and an extra twin axle bogie, to make up a total of four bogies. Each ABDeh 8/8 body is mounted, at its outer end, on an outer bogie, via two side frames. However, at each body's other end, that body is connected by a central pedestal to another bogie, and also connected, via a coupling, to the other body.

Behind the cab, at the Brig end of each vehicle, is a first class compartment. At the Zermatt end, the cab is backed up by a baggage compartment. Otherwise, each of the two end car bodies differs somewhat from its ABDeh 6/6 equivalent, with the compartment behind the cab being followed by an entry platform, and only then by an equipment room and toilet (the reverse of the ABDeh 6/6 configuration). Like the ABDeh 6/6, the ABDeh 8/8 has a second class compartment at the middle end of each car body.

All three members of the class have a drive shaft with angled axle drive. In another departure from the ABDeh 6/6 configuration, the transformer in each vehicle is mounted under the floor, instead of above the entry platforms.

== Service history ==
After entering service in 1965, the three ABDeh 8/8 class vehicles generally operated successfully. However, in 1980 their rubber springing, which had been responsible for causing frequent derailments, was replaced by flexicoil suspensions.

In 1985–88, the ABDeh 8/8s were rebuilt for use on shuttle train services. From then until the end of 2005, they were put to use on regular Zermatt shuttle trains. These trains linked, and still link, Zermatt railway station, which serves the car-free mountaineering and ski resort of Zermatt, with Täsch railway station, where there is a large parking station for people travelling to or from Zermatt by road vehicle.

From 2005 until 2014, the ABDeh 8/8s had been used on peak period Zermatt Shuttle trains, and as reserve vehicles.

The delivery of the modern Stadler railcars has allowed the gradual withdrawal of these units, the last one being taken out of service in 2014.
