= Rhaetian Railway Ge 3/3 =

Swiss electric shunting locomotive

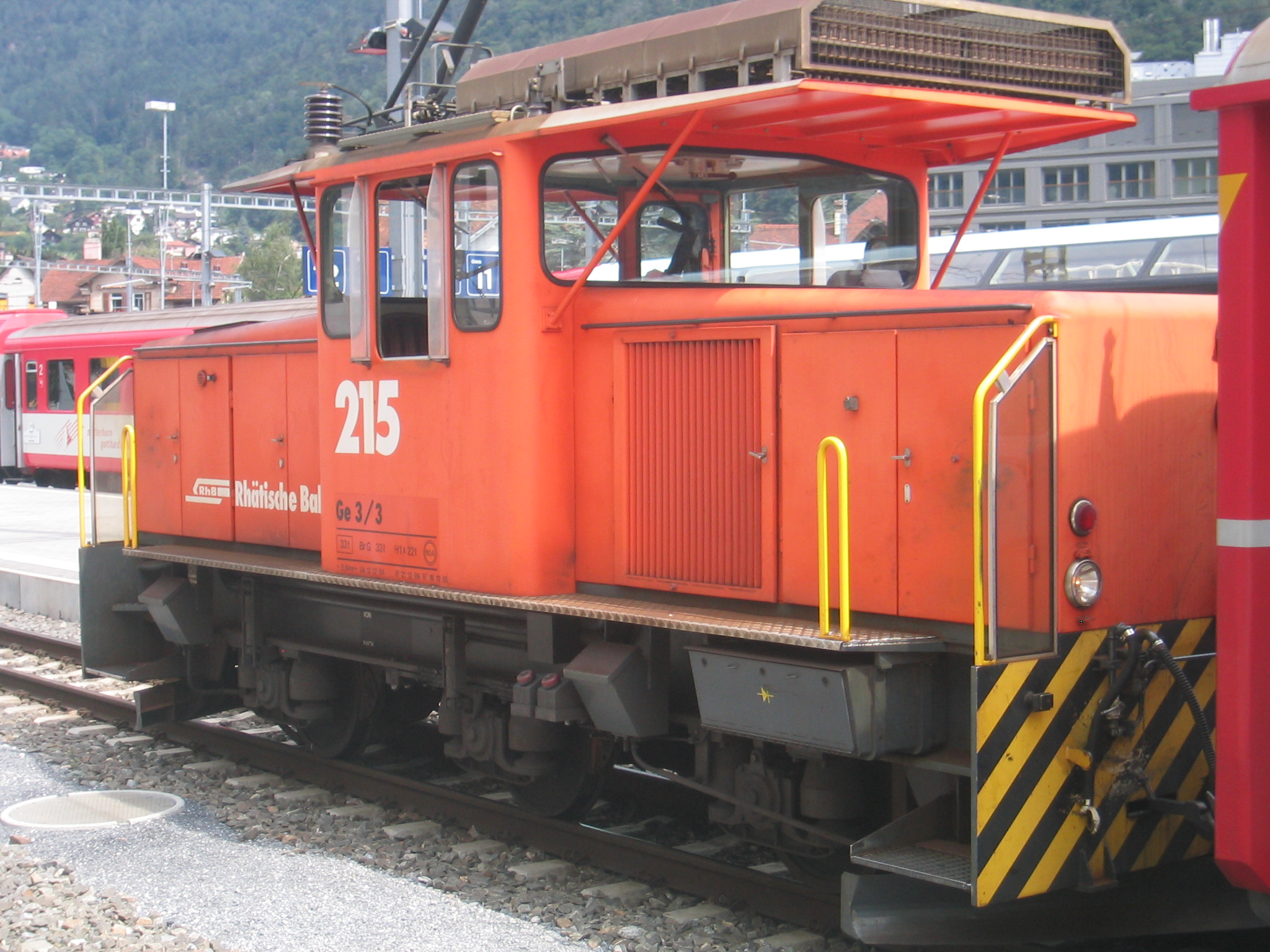
- Ge 3/3 215 in Chur
Type and origin
- Power type: Electric
- Builder: Robert Aebi (Raco) and BBC
- Build date: 1984
- Total produced: 2
Specifications
- Configuration
  - Whyte: 6wOE
  - UIC: Co
- Gauge: 1,000 mm (3 ft 3 3/8 in)
- Loco weight: 33 tonnes (32.5 long tons; 36.4 short tons)
- Electric system/s: 11 kV 16.7 Hz AC Overhead
- Current pickup(s): Pantograph
Performance figures
- Maximum speed: 40 km/h (25 mph)
- Power output: 425 kW (570 hp) at 27 km/h (17 mph)
Career
- Operators: Rhaetian Railway
- Numbers: 214, 215
- Locale: Graubünden, Switzerland
- Current owner: Rhaetian Railway
- Disposition: Both still in service

The Rhaetian Railway Ge 3/3 is a class of metre gauge 11 kV 16.7 Hz AC electric shunting locomotives operated by the Rhaetian Railway (RhB), which is the main railway network in the Canton of Graubünden, Switzerland.

The class is so named under the Swiss locomotive and railcar classification system. According to that system, Ge 3/3 denotes a narrow gauge electric adhesion locomotive with a total of three axles, all of which are drive axles. There are only two locomotives in the Ge 3/3 class, and they are numbered 214 and 215.

Delivered by Robert Aebi (Raco) and Brown, Boveri & Cie (BBC), the Ge 3/3s feature some componentry — e.g., traction motor, compressor and vacuum pump — that are the same as the corresponding components in the second series locomotives of the Rhaetian Railway Ge 4/4 ^{II} class.

The orange liveried Ge 3/3 locomotives are used at major Rhaetian Railway stations: no 214 in Samedan and no 215 in Chur.

== Gallery ==
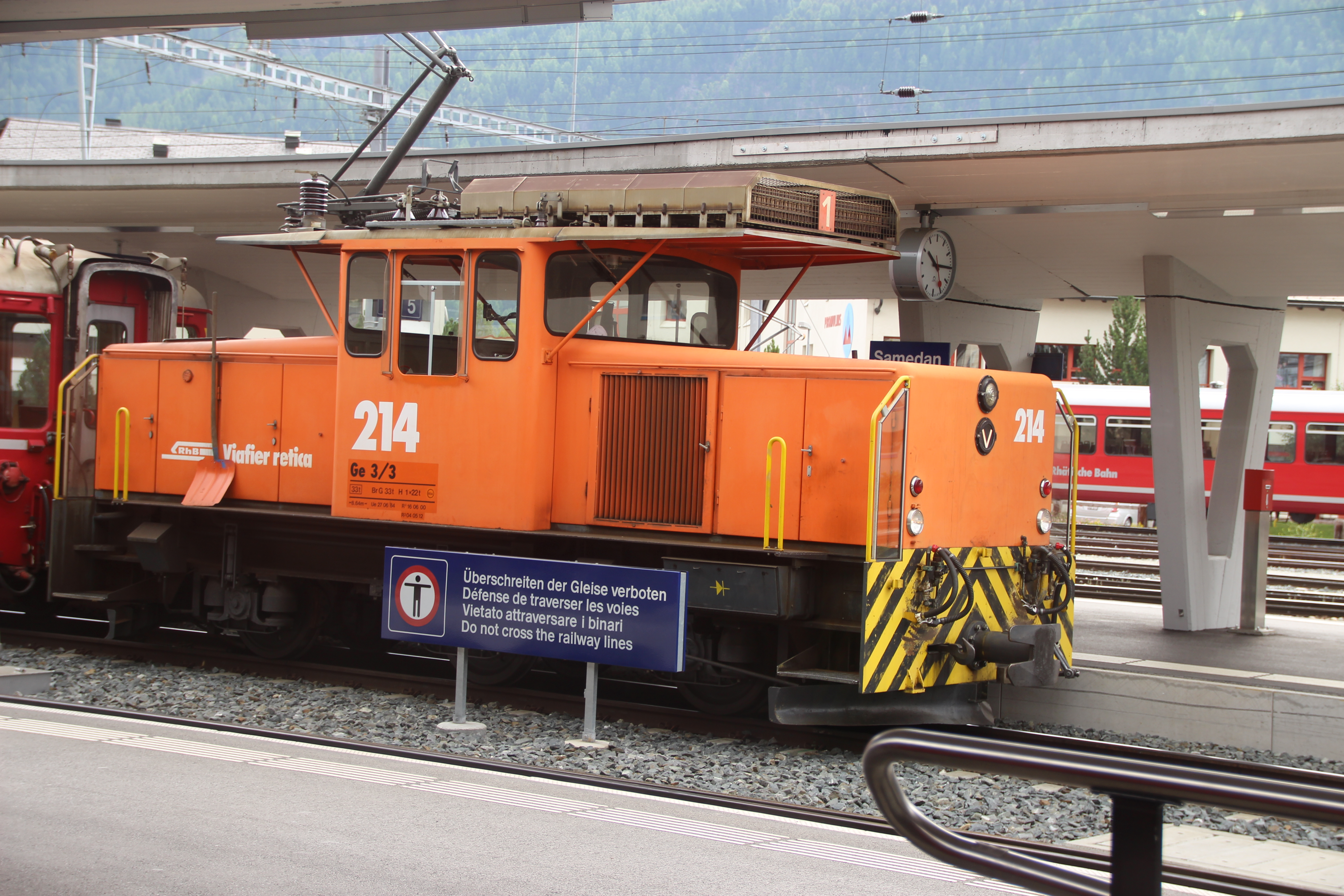
RhB Ge 3/3 214 in Samedan

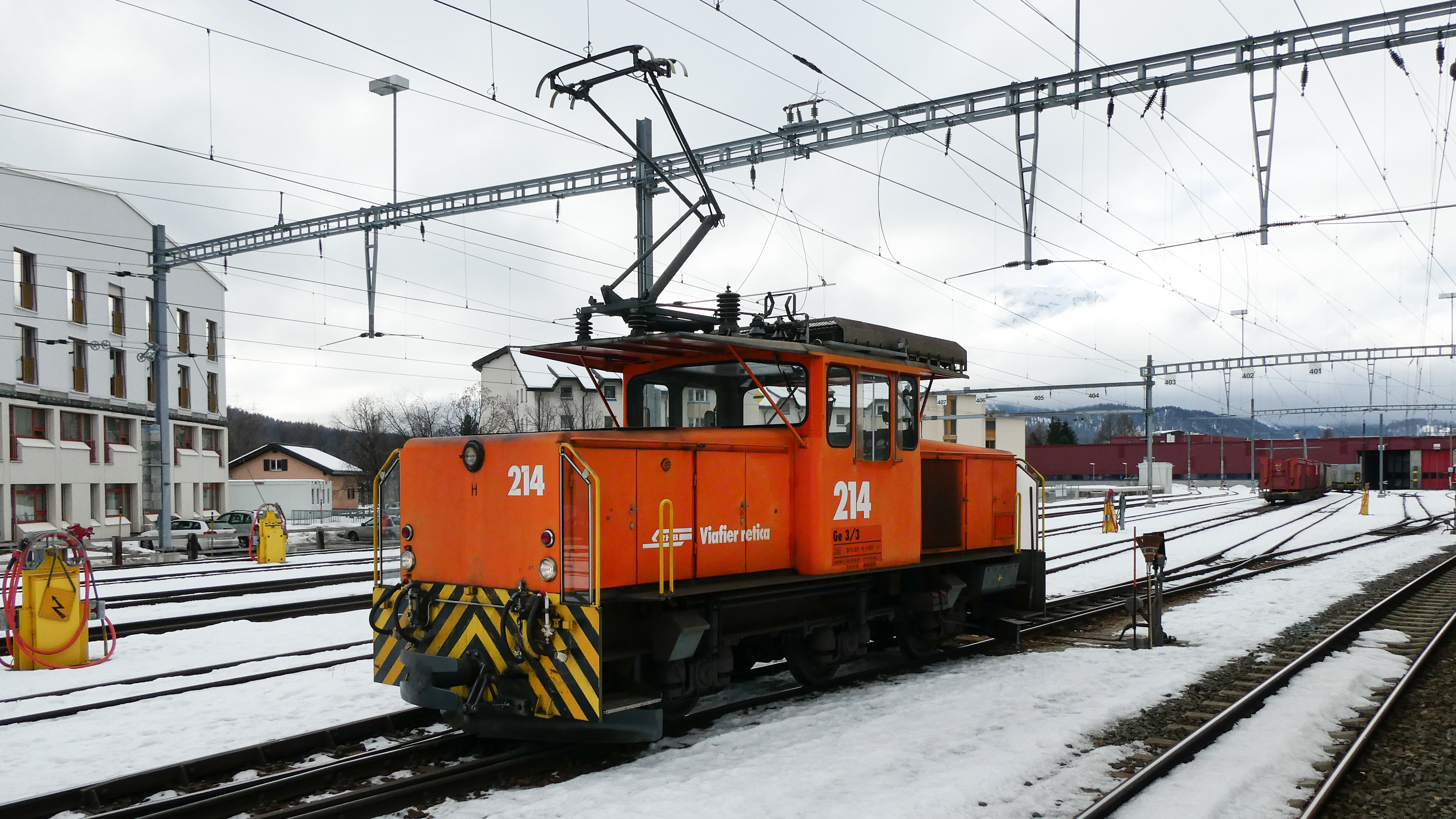
RhB Ge 3/3 214 in Samedan

== See also ==
- History of rail transport in Switzerland
- Rail transport in Switzerland
