= Brig-Visp-Zermatt-Bahn ABDeh 6/6 =

Brig-Visp-Zermatt-Bahn ABDeh 6/6 Matterhorn Gotthard Bahn BDeh 6/6
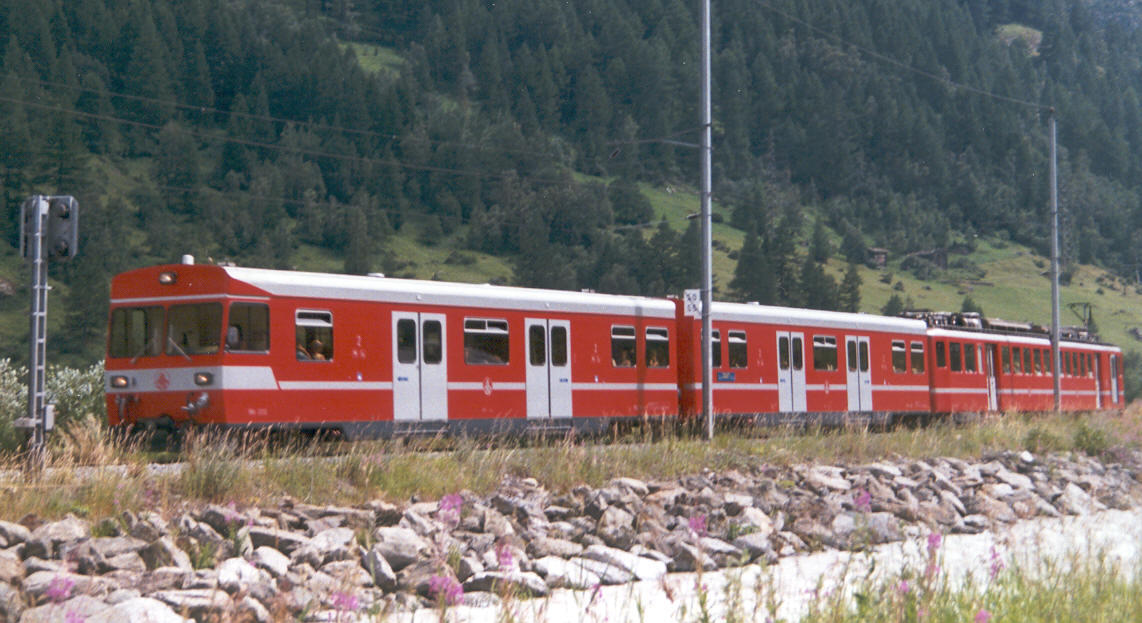
- BDkt, BDk and BDeh 6/6 form a Zermatt Shuttle train at Täsch, 23 July 1994.
- Manufacturer: Swiss Locomotive and Machine Works
- Constructed: 1960
- Scrapped: 2003
- Number built: 2
- Number scrapped: 2
- Fleet numbers: 2031–2032
- Operators: Brig-Visp-Zermatt-Bahn; Matterhorn Gotthard Bahn

Specifications
- Train length: 32,300 mm (106 ft 0 in)
- Maximum speed: Adhesion: 55 km/h (34 mph); Rack rail: 30 km/h (19 mph)
- Weight: 71.5 tonnes (157,600 lb)
- Power output: 882 kW (1,180 hp)
- Electric system(s): 11 kV 16.7 Hz
- Current collector(s): Overhead
- UIC classification: Bo′Bo′Bo′
- Track gauge: 1,000 mm (3 ft 3 3/8 in)

The Brig-Visp-Zermatt-Bahn ABDeh 6/6, later known as the BDeh 6/6, and later still as the Matterhorn Gotthard Bahn BDeh 6/6, was a two member class of metre gauge, rack rail, electric multiple units operated by the Brig-Visp-Zermatt-Bahn (BVZ), and later by the Matterhorn Gotthard Bahn (MGB), in the Canton of Valais, Switzerland.

The class was so named under the Swiss locomotive and railcar classification system. According to that system, the class's original classification, ABDeh 6/6, denotes an electric railcar with first and second class compartments, a baggage compartment, and a total of six axles, all of which are drive axles fitted with cogwheels for rack rail operation.

The later classification of this class, BDeh 6/6, signifies a vehicle with no first class facilities, but otherwise the same characteristics as a vehicle of the original classification.

The class entered the BVZ fleet in 1960. Both of its members were rebuilt in 1981-82. From then onwards, both vehicles were confined to Zermatt Shuttle trains. In 2003, shortly after the MGB had become both members' owners (following a merger between the BVZ and the Furka Oberalp Bahn), they were withdrawn from service and scrapped.

== The introduction of the class ==
At the end of the 1950s, the BVZ recorded a strong growth in traffic, for which it procured new rolling stock. The ABDeh 6/6, delivered in 1960, had the advantage, compared with the then current HGe 4/4, of being a passenger railcar that could be used just by itself as a passenger train, without any additional passenger cars. It also had a higher towing capacity of 125 tonnes (123 long tons; 138 short tons), which was made possible by the inclusion of extra drive axles, as a higher tensile force per axle could not be achieved using the cogwheel system.

== Technical details ==
The two members of the ABDeh 6/6 class each had a pair of passenger car bodies connected together, and three twin axle bogies. Each body was mounted, at its outer end, on an outer bogie, via two side frames. At each body's other end, that body was connected, in combination with the other body, to a central Jacobs bogie, in each case via a central pedestal.

Behind the cab, at the Brig end of each vehicle, was a first class compartment, and, at the Zermatt end, the cab was backed up by a baggage compartment. In each of the two car bodies, the compartment behind the cab was followed by an equipment room and toilet, then by an entry platform, and finally, towards the middle end of that car body, by the second class compartment.

Both vehicles had a drive shaft with angled axle drive. The transformer in each vehicle was mounted above the entrance platform.

== Service history ==
The ABDeh 6/6 class was an operational success. In 1965, the BVZ therefore took delivery of the three ABDeh 8/8 class vehicles, as a similar follow up order.

In 1981-82, the two ABDeh 6/6s were rebuilt, and, in light of the removal of their facilities for first class passengers, were reclassified as BDeh 6/6 class vehicles. From then onwards, until the introduction of the new BDSeh 4/8 class in 2003, the BDeh 6/6s were used to operate Zermatt shuttle trains. These trains linked, and still link, Zermatt railway station, which serves the car-free mountaineering and ski resort of Zermatt, with Täsch railway station, where there is a large parking station for people travelling to or from Zermatt by road vehicle.

When the new BDSeh 4/8s joined the fleet, the BDeh 6/6s became surplus to requirements, were withdrawn from service, and scrapped.
