= Furka–Oberalp-Bahn Ge 4/4 III =

Swiss electric locomotive

Furka Oberalp Bahn Ge 4/4 ^{III} Matterhorn Gotthard Bahn Ge 4/4 ^{III}
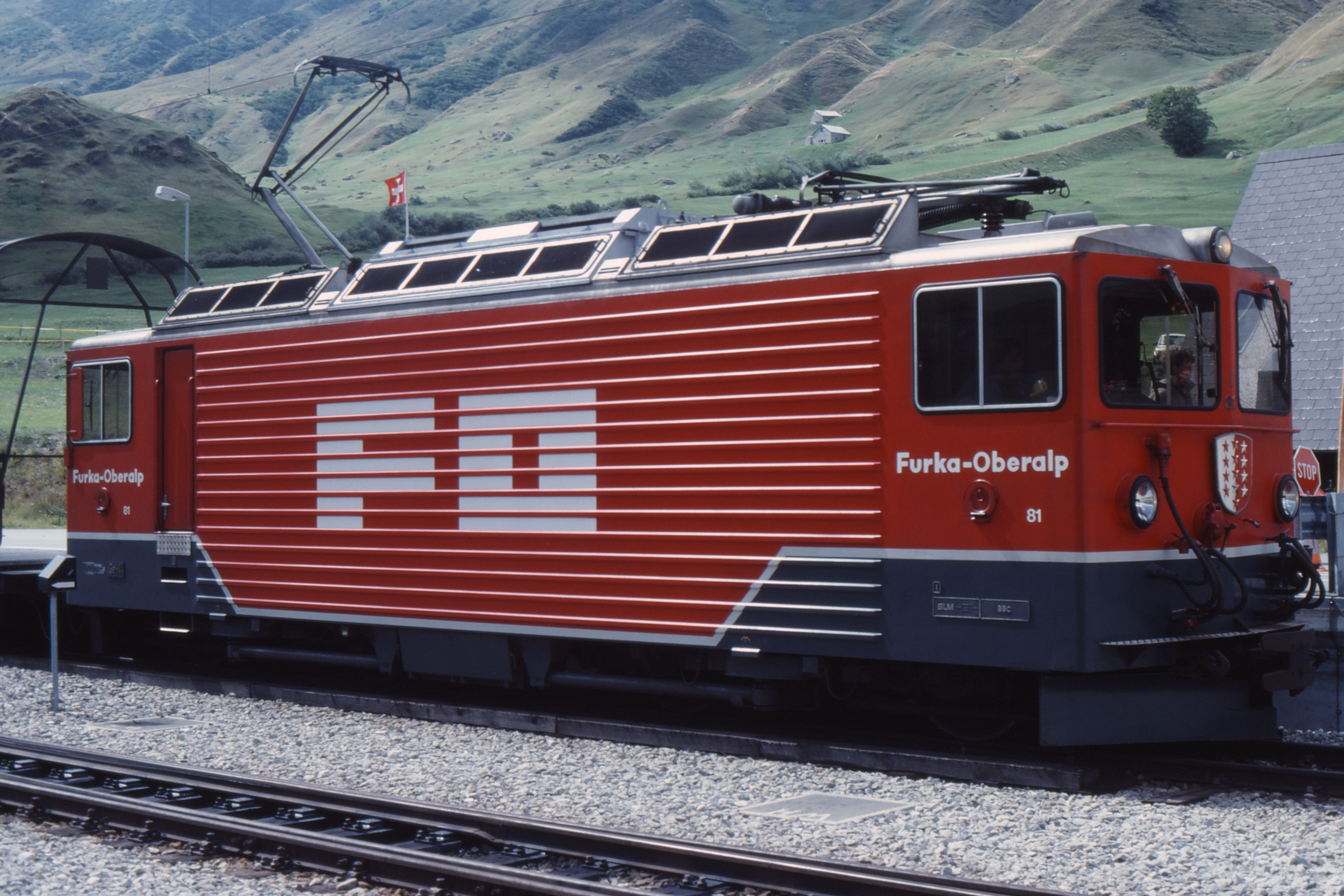
- Ge 4/4 ^{III} 81 in Realp
Type and origin
- Power type: Electric
- Builder: SLM and BBC
- Build date: 1979
- Total produced: 2
Specifications
- Configuration
  - UIC: Bo′Bo′
- Gauge: 1,000 mm (3 ft 3 3/8 in)
- Length: 12,900 mm (42 ft 4 in)
- Width: 2,684 mm (8 ft 10 in)
- Loco weight: 50 tonnes (110,200 lb)
- Electric system/s: 11 kV 16.7 Hz
- Current pickup(s): Overhead
- Traction motors: Four (type 6 FRO 4338)
Performance figures
- Maximum speed: 90 km/h (56 mph)
- Power output: 1,700 kW (2,280 hp)
- Tractive effort: 101.5 kN (22,820 lbf)
Career
- Operators: Furka Oberalp Bahn; Matterhorn Gotthard Bahn
- Numbers: 81, 82
- Locale: Valais and Uri, Switzerland
- First run: 1980
- Disposition: All scrapped

The Furka Oberalp Bahn Ge 4/4 ^{III}, later known as the Matterhorn Gotthard Bahn Ge 4/4 ^{III}, was a two-member class of metre gauge electric locomotives operated until 2002 by the Furka Oberalp Bahn (FO), and until 2023 by its successor, the Matterhorn Gotthard Bahn, between the Cantons of Valais and Uri in southern Switzerland.

== History ==
The Furka Oberalp Bahn (FO) acquired these Bo′Bo′ locomotives in 1979 for the purpose of hauling car shuttle trains through the then forthcoming Furka Base Tunnel.

Between the delivery of these locomotives and the completion of the Furka Base Tunnel, both members of the class were leased to the Rhaetian Railway, where they entered service hauling express trains on the Albula Railway. Since the opening of the Base Tunnel in 1982, they have been used exclusively on car shuttle trains between Oberwald and Realp.

On 1 January 2003, the locomotives became the property of the Matterhorn Gotthard Bahn (MGB), following a merger between the FO and the Brig-Visp-Zermatt railway (BVZ).

== Technical details ==
The two locomotives represented a further development of the Ge 4/4 ^{II} class of the Rhaetian Railway. They were therefore classified as Ge 4/4 ^{III} under the Swiss locomotive and railcar classification system, even though the FO had not previously operated Ge 4/4 type locomotives. According to the Swiss classification system, Ge 4/4 ^{III} denotes a third series of narrow gauge electric adhesion locomotives with four axles, all of which are drive axles.

The Ge 4/4 ^{III}s developed 1,700 kilowatts (2,300 hp), had a top speed of 90 kilometres per hour (56 mph), and operated at 11 kV 16.7 Hz AC under catenary. They were the only mainline locomotives of the MGB not fitted with cogwheels for rack railway operations.

== List of locomotives ==
List of Ge 4/4 ^{III} locomotives of the Matterhorn Gotthard Bahn
Traffic number	Name	Commissioning	Status
81	Wallis	27.02.1980	Scrapped in December 2023
82	Uri	27.02.1980	Scrapped in November 2017

== Gallery ==
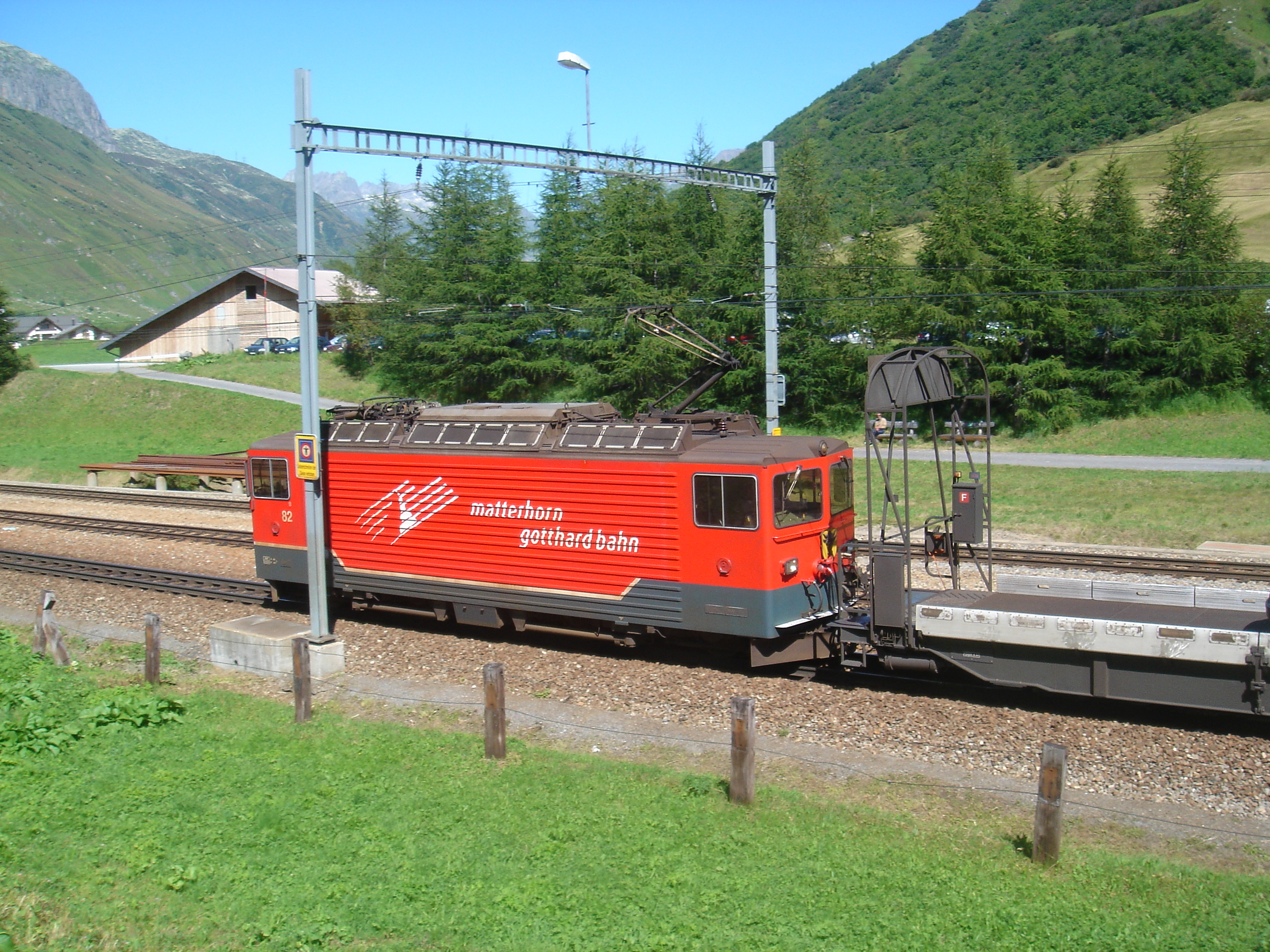
No 82 in MGB livery

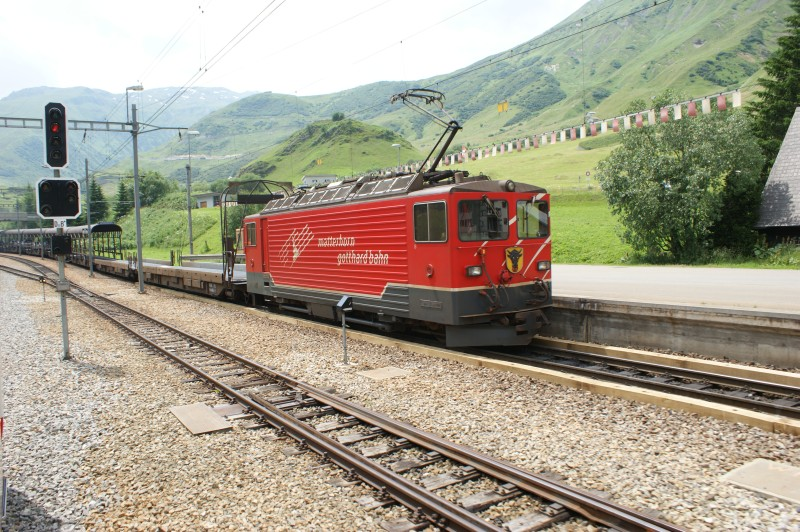
No 82 and car shuttle train

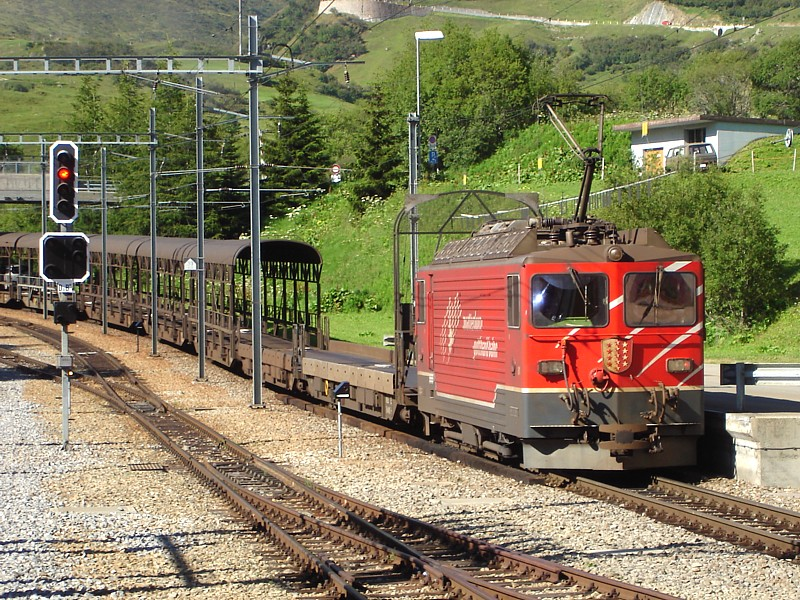
No 81 in MGB livery

== See also ==
- Furka Pass
- Oberalp Pass
- History of rail transport in Switzerland
- Rail transport in Switzerland
