= Furka–Oberalp-Bahn Deh 4/4 I =

Furka Oberalp Bahn Deh 4/4 I Matterhorn Gotthard Bahn Deh 4/4 51–55
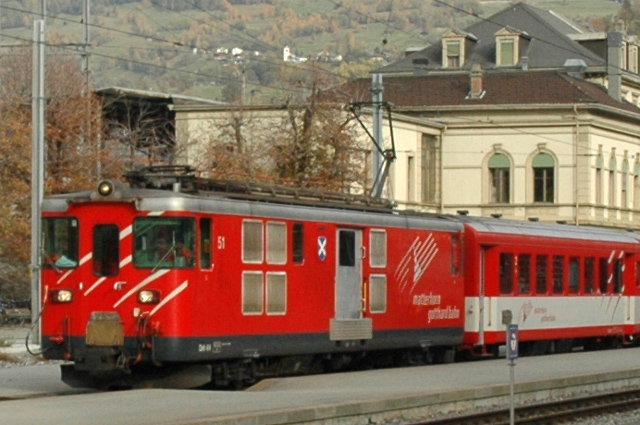
- Deh 4/4 No. 51 at Brig, 2006.
- Manufacturer: SLM (bogies); SIG (bodies); BBC (electrical equipment)
- Constructed: 1972
- Entered service: 1972
- Number built: 5
- Number in service: 5
- Fleet numbers: 51–55
- Operators: Furka Oberalp Bahn (1972–2002); Matterhorn Gotthard Bahn (since 2002)

Specifications
- Train length: 16,900 mm (55 ft 5 in)
- Maximum speed: Adhesion: 60 km/h (37 mph); Rack rail: 30 km/h (19 mph)
- Weight: 48.3 tonnes (106,500 lb)
- Traction system: 4
- Power output: 1,032 kW (1,380 hp)
- Electric system(s): 11 kV 16.7 Hz
- Current collector(s): Overhead
- UIC classification: Bo'Bo'
- Track gauge: 1,000 mm (3 ft 3 3/8 in)

The Furka Oberalp Bahn Deh 4/4 I, now known as the Matterhorn Gotthard Bahn Deh 4/4 51–55, is a five member class of metre gauge, rack rail, electric multiple units operated until 2002 by the Furka Oberalp Bahn (FO), and since then by its successor, the Matterhorn Gotthard Bahn (MGB), in the Canton of Valais, Switzerland.

The class is so named under the Swiss locomotive and railcar classification system. According to that system, Deh 4/4 denotes an electric railcar with a baggage compartment, and a total of four axles, all of which are drive axles fitted with cogwheels for rack rail operation. The Deh 4/4 I class entered the FO fleet in 1972, and all of its members are still in service.

Four mechanically similar vehicles, with different electrical equipment, were procured by the Brig-Visp-Zermatt-Bahn (BVZ) as the Deh 4/4 21–24 class, and now similarly form part of the MGB fleet. Six mechanically different vehicles with identical electrical equipment were delivered to FO in 1979 and 1984 as the Deh 4/4 91–96; these, too, are now part of the MGB fleet.

== Introduction of the class ==
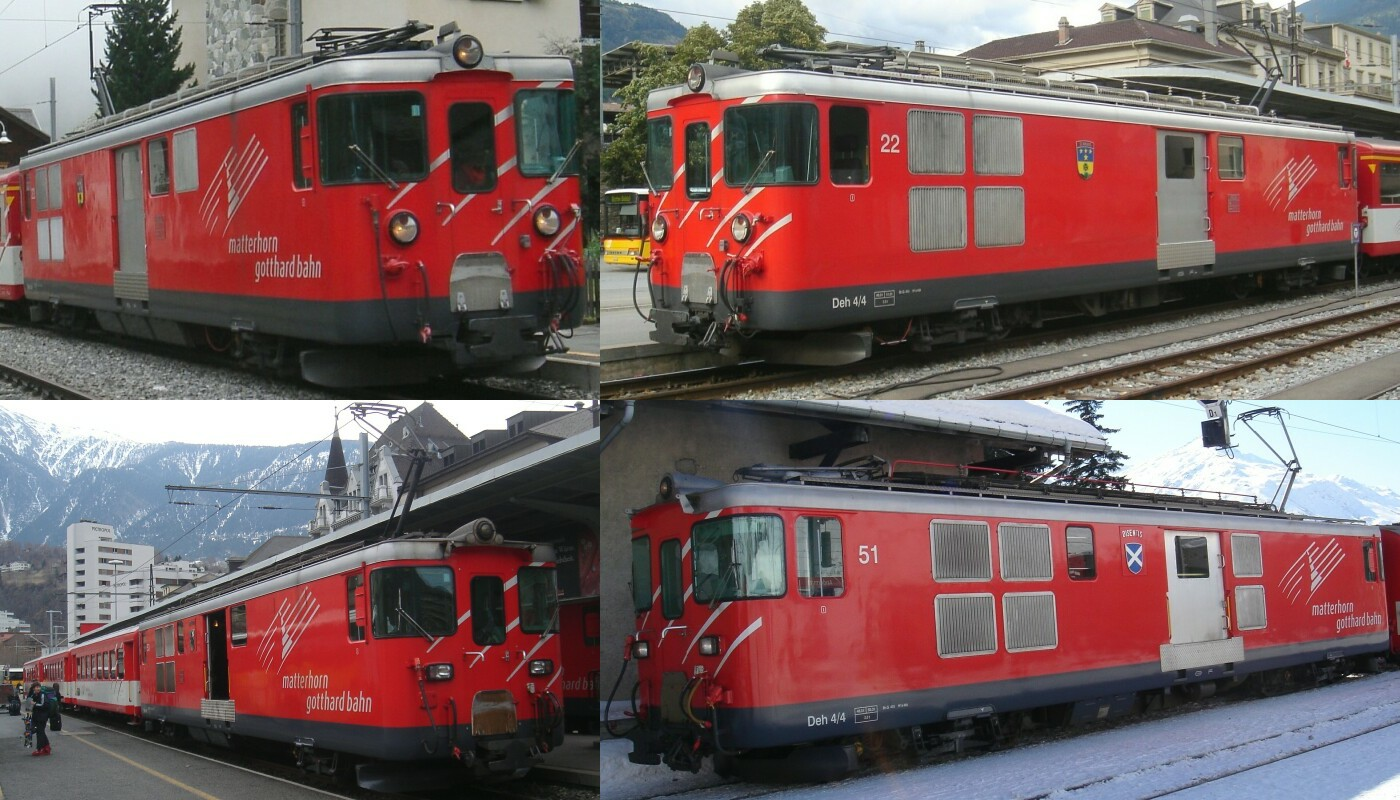
Comparative views of the ex BVZ Deh (above) and the ex FO Deh (below).

As the FO's fleet of rolling stock was obsolete in the 1960s and winter season traffic was strongly increasing, the FO urgently needed more powerful locomotives. The company opted for efficient multiple unit power cars with baggage compartments that could be used freely on the whole network.

The five vehicles of the type Deh 4/4 were ordered in 1972 and replaced the HGe 2/2s and ABDeh 2/4s, which could no longer cope with the winter sports traffic on the Schöllenenbahn.

Along with the power cars, the FO procured four control cars and eight matching coaches, from which four three-part push-pull trains could be formed. In 1977, an additional, fifth, push-pull train was created from existing rolling stock.

A later version of the FO Deh 4/4 was constructed with a completely different body, which is why the later vehicles were identified by the FO as Deh 4/4 II. Since the merger between the FO and the BVZ to create the MGB, this identifier has fallen into disuse; the MGB distinguishes the two series by their numbers, beginning with 51 and 91, respectively.

== Technical details ==
The Deh4/4 I are cab unit locomotives with one cab at each end. For the sake of saving weight, the vehicle body is constructed of lightweight metal.

The equipment cabinets with electronic and pneumatic equipment are housed in the middle of the luggage compartment. The transformer is located under the vehicle.

Each of the bogies is equipped with two traction motors, and with Abt rack system pinion wheels.

== Service history ==
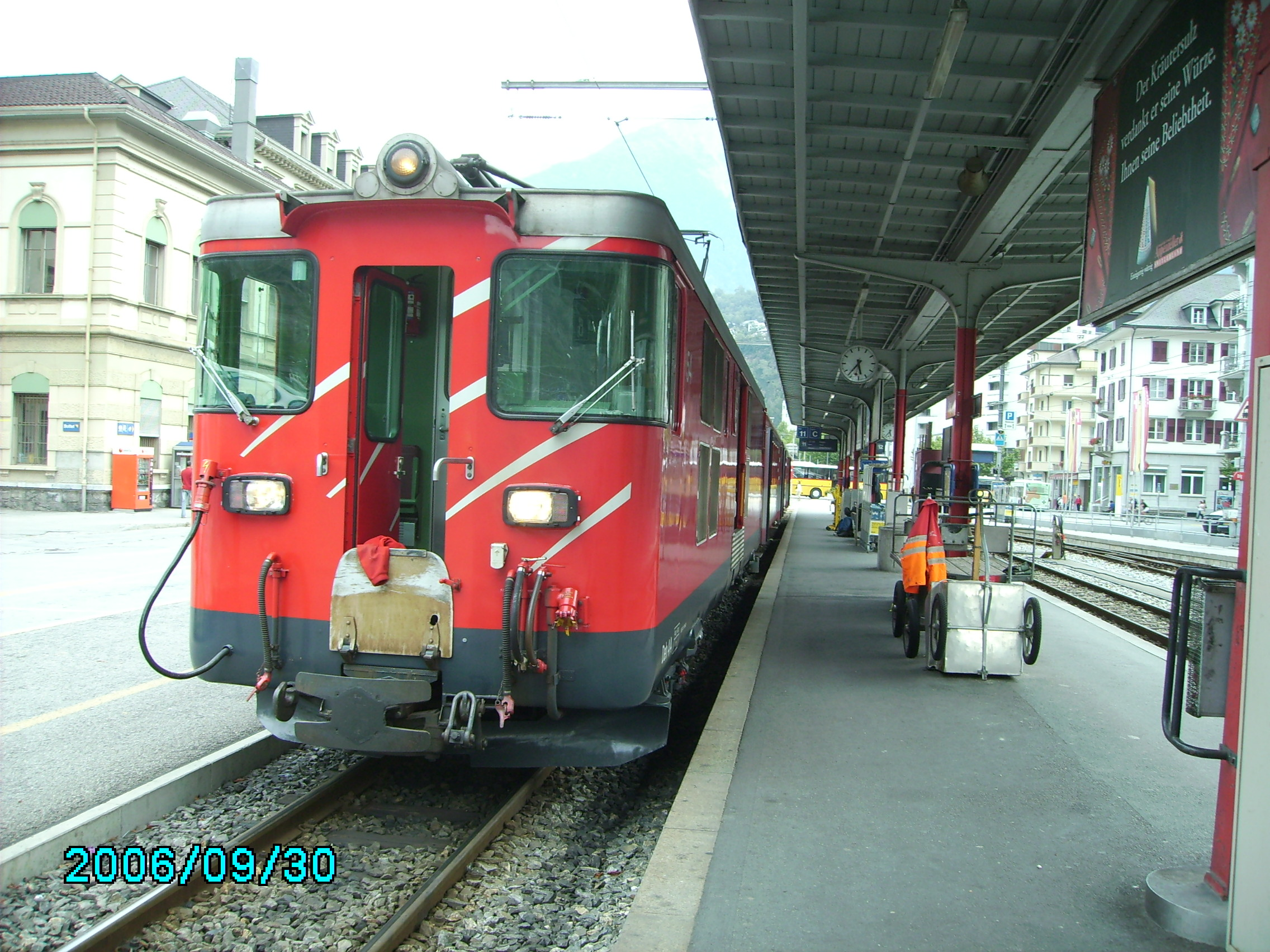
Deh 4/4 I 54 with open front door.

The former FO Deh 4/4 Is and IIs are used mainly together with two intermediate trailers and one control car as permanently coupled push-pull trains. Between Disentis/Mustér and Andermatt (Oberalp, 110%), one additional car, and between Visp and Andermatt (Goms, 90%) two additional cars, can be attached. Between Andermatt and Göschenen (Schöllenenschlucht, 179%), no additional cars can be used.

The push-pull trains are coupled together with the automatic +GF+ type coupling. For other uses, the couplings must be replaced. Operations of the class to Zermatt have not been reported.

== List of vehicles ==
Road number	Name	Commissioning	Status
51	Disentis/Mustér	1972	in service
52	Tujetsch/Sedrun	1972	in service
53	Urseren	1972	in service
54	Goms	1972	in service
55	Brig	1972	in service

== See also ==
- Furka Pass
- Furka Base Tunnel
- Oberalp Pass
- History of rail transport in Switzerland
- Rail transport in Switzerland
