= Hospental =

- Municipality
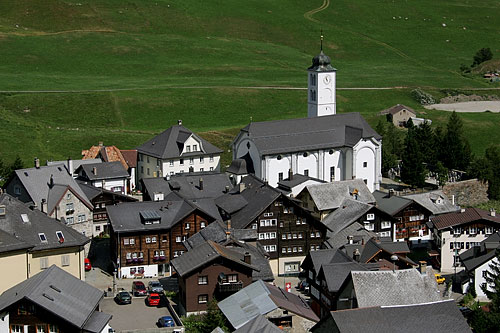

- Coat of arms
- Location of Hospental
- Location within Switzerland Location within Canton of Uri
- Coordinates: 46°37′N 8°34′E
- Country: Switzerland
- Canton: Uri
- District: n.a.

Area
  - Total: 34.97 km^{2} (13.50 sq mi)
- Elevation (Church): 1,495 m (4,905 ft)

Population (December 2020)
  - Total: 182
  - Density: 5.20/km^{2} (13.5/sq mi)
- Time zone: UTC+01:00 (CET)
  - Summer (DST): UTC+02:00 (CEST)
- Postal code: 6493
- SFOS number: 1210
- ISO 3166 code: CH-UR
- Surrounded by: Airolo (TI), Andermatt, Göschenen, Realp
- Website: www.hospental.ch

Hospental (locally Oschpidall) is a village and a municipality in the middle of the Alpine valley called Urseren in the canton of Uri in Switzerland.

== History ==
Hospental is first mentioned in 1285 as Hospenthal. In 1499 it was mentioned under its Latin name as Hospicium, and in 1616 as Spithal.

== Geography ==
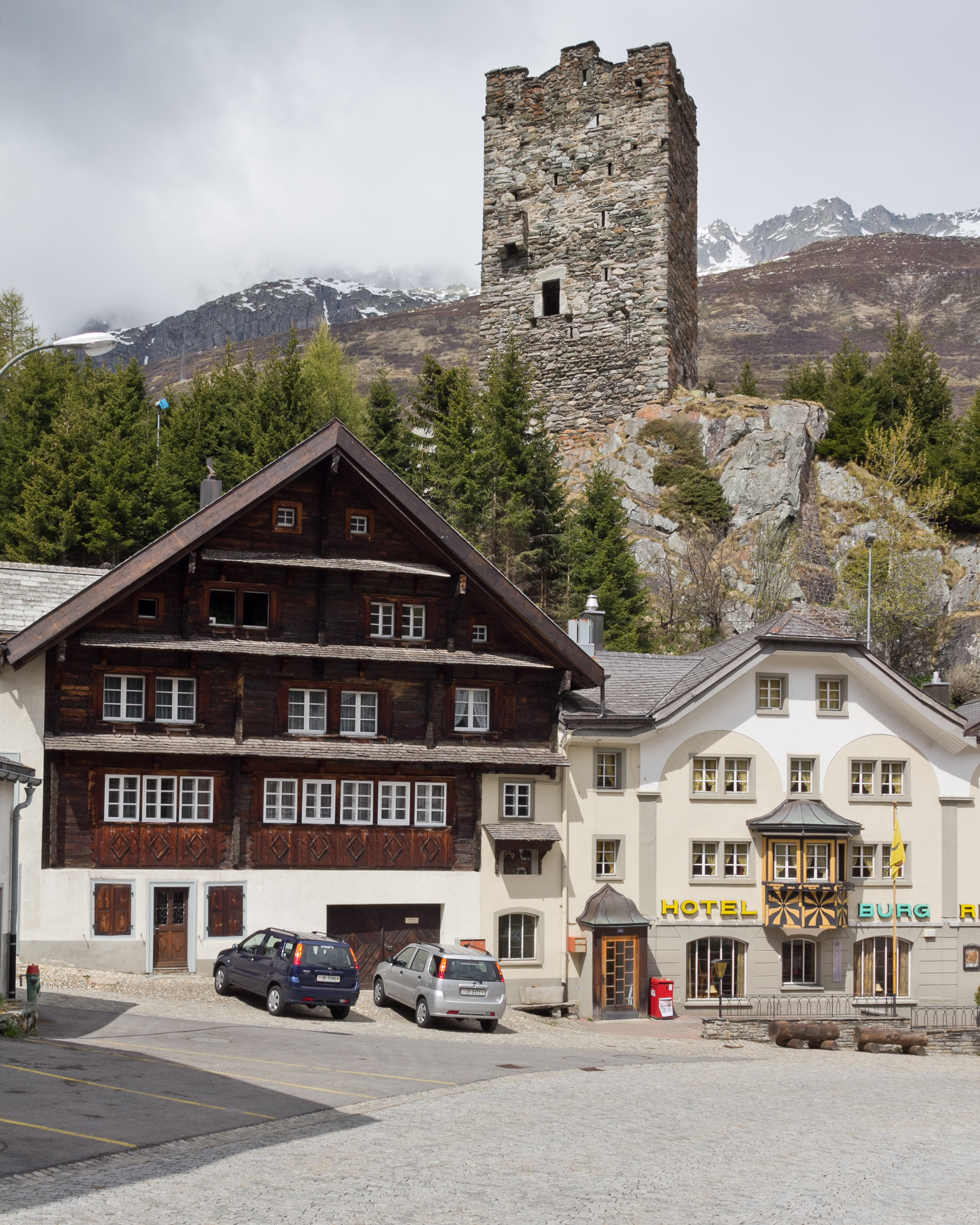
Tower and Hotel Burg

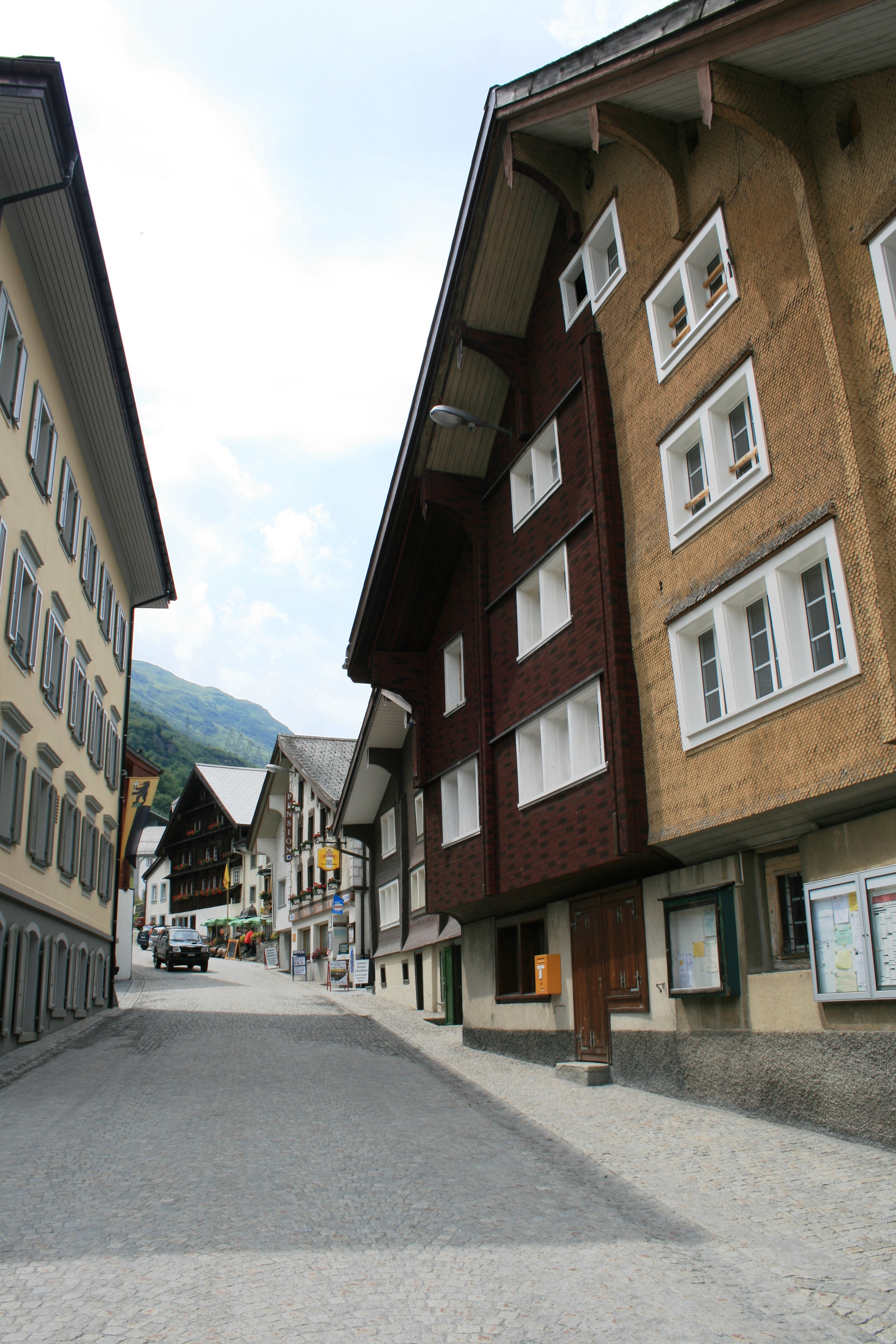
Village of Hospental

Aerial view (1963)

The municipality is located in the valley called Urseren at the intersection of the routes over the Furka Pass and the route over the Gotthard Pass. It consists of the linear village of Hospental and the hamlet of Zumdorf.

The Gotthardreuss runs through the village and forms together with the Furkareuss, traversing the village at its north border, the beginning of the Reuss.

Hospental has an area, as of 2006, of 35 km^{2} (14 sq mi). Of this area, 32.3% is used for agricultural purposes, while 9.7% is forested. Of the rest of the land, 1.4% is settled (buildings or roads) and the remainder (56.6%) is non-productive (rivers, glaciers or mountains). In the 1993/97 land survey, 0.8% of the total land area was heavily forested, while 8.9% is covered in small trees and shrubbery. Of the agricultural land, 5.3% is used for orchards or vine crops and 27.1% is used for alpine pastures. Of the settled areas, 0.1% is covered with buildings, 0.3% is classed as special developments, and 1.0% is transportation infrastructure. Of the unproductive areas, 0.1% is unproductive standing water (ponds or lakes), 1.1% is unproductive flowing water (rivers), 34.9% is too rocky for vegetation, and 20.5% is other unproductive land.

== Demographics ==
Hospental has a population (as of 31 December 2020) of 182. As of 2007, 1.4% of the population was made up of foreign nationals. Over the last 10 years the population has decreased at a rate of -8.6%. Most of the population (as of 2000) speaks German (97.6%), with Rhaeto-Romance being second most common (1.5%) and Italian being third (0.5%). As of 2007 the gender distribution of the population was 50.9% male and 49.1% female.

In the 2007 federal election the FDP party received 94.3% of the vote.

In Hospental about 50% of the population (between age 25–64) have completed either non-mandatory upper secondary education or additional higher education (either university or a Fachhochschule).

Hospental has an unemployment rate of 0.33%. As of 2005, there were 19 people employed in the primary economic sector and about 8 businesses involved in this sector. 4 people are employed in the secondary sector and there are 2 businesses in this sector. 30 people are employed in the tertiary sector, with 13 businesses in this sector.

The historical population is given in the following table:

year	population
1700	34 households
1734	84 households
1799	368
1850	424
1900	290
1950	282
1970	285
1980	242
1990	202
2000	206
2005	220
2007	212
2008	189
2010	177
2014	196

== Tower ==
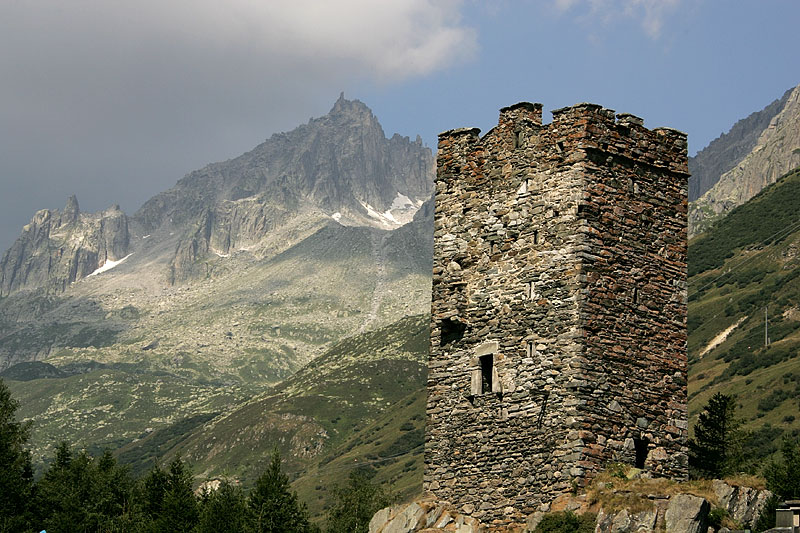
Hospental tower ruins

The tower was built in the later half of the 13th century for the 'von Hospental' family (until 1317), first mentioned in records at the same time, and dominates the village and is a reminder of the importance of the valley Urseren as a central cross of south-north and east-west links on the central Swiss Alps for many centuries. Now without floors, it was originally used as a watch tower, and had external covered platforms at the sides.

== Church ==
The Catholic Church of Maria Himmelfahrt was built in 1705–11 by Bartholomaus Schmid. The baroque building has exterior blind arches, like the same architect's parish church in Andermatt.

== Haus Müller-Lombardi ==
The most important historic house in the village is the recently restored patrician family home of the Müller family, known locally as the Haus Müller-Lombardi because the last of the family who lived there, Lina Müller (died 1978) was the nineteenth child of Carl Alois Müller and Genovefa Lombardi. She established a Stiftung (Trust) to preserve the land and buildings (like Haus Wesemli) in the Urseren which were not part of the Stiftung established by her brother Adolfo Müller-Ury, the American portrait painter, for the preservation of the Haus Müller itself.

The house which was erected in 1687 for Johann-Caspar Müller, and whose roof is now returned to its original shape, and now reveals its original red exterior and attractively decorated green-painted windows. Inside the house are portraits of Johann Caspar Müller, his son Johann Sebastian Müller and his wife, as well as other portraits of members of this distinguished local family by Lorenz Justin Ritz and Felix Maria Diogg. There are also works by Adolfo Müller-Ury, the American portrait painter, including portraits of Popes Benedict XV and Pius XII.

== Ski area ==
In Hospental there is a mountain called Winterhorn, which has been disused since 2007. The 2-man chairlift and the T-bar which were used remain in place. It was part of the Skiarena Andermatt-Sedrun.

== Transport ==
The municipality is served by Hospental railway station and PostBus stops.
