= Hospental railway station =

Railway station in Switzerland

Hospental
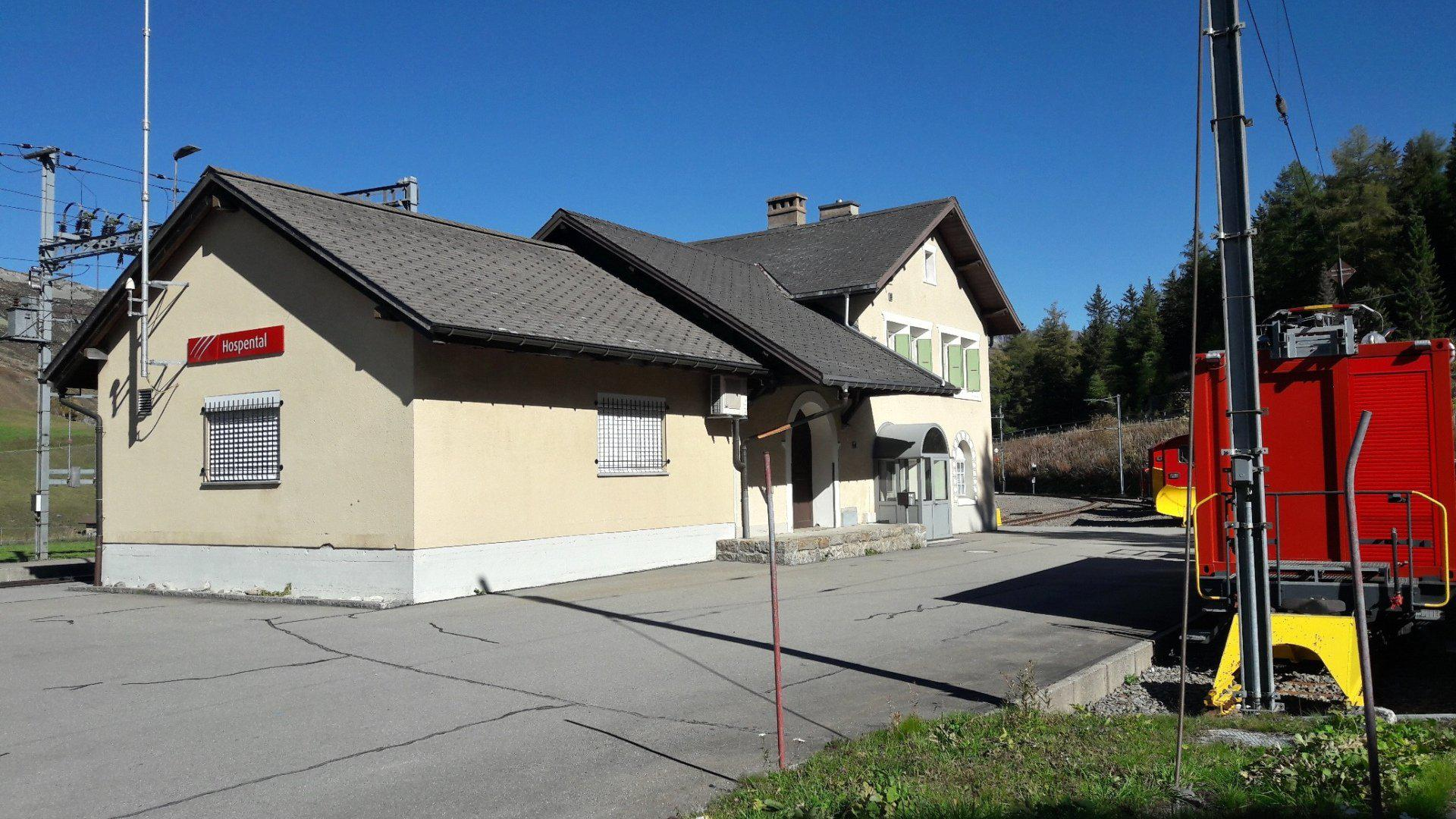
- The station building in 2018

General information
- Location: Hospental; Switzerland
- Coordinates: 46°37′16″N 8°34′16″E
- Owner: Matterhorn Gotthard Bahn
- Line: Furka Oberalp line
- Train operators: Matterhorn Gotthard Bahn

Services
Preceding station	Matterhorn Gotthard Bahn	Following station
Realp towards Visp	R 43	Andermatt Terminus
Realp Terminus	R 44	Andermatt towards Göschenen
Location
- Location within Switzerland

Hospental railway station (German: Bahnhof Hospental), is a railway station in the municipality of Hospental, in the Swiss canton of Uri. It is an intermediate stop on the 1,000 mm (3 ft 3 3/8 in) gauge Furka Oberalp line of the Matterhorn Gotthard Bahn and is served by local trains only.

== Services ==
The following services stop at Hospental:

- Regio: hourly service between Visp and Andermatt.
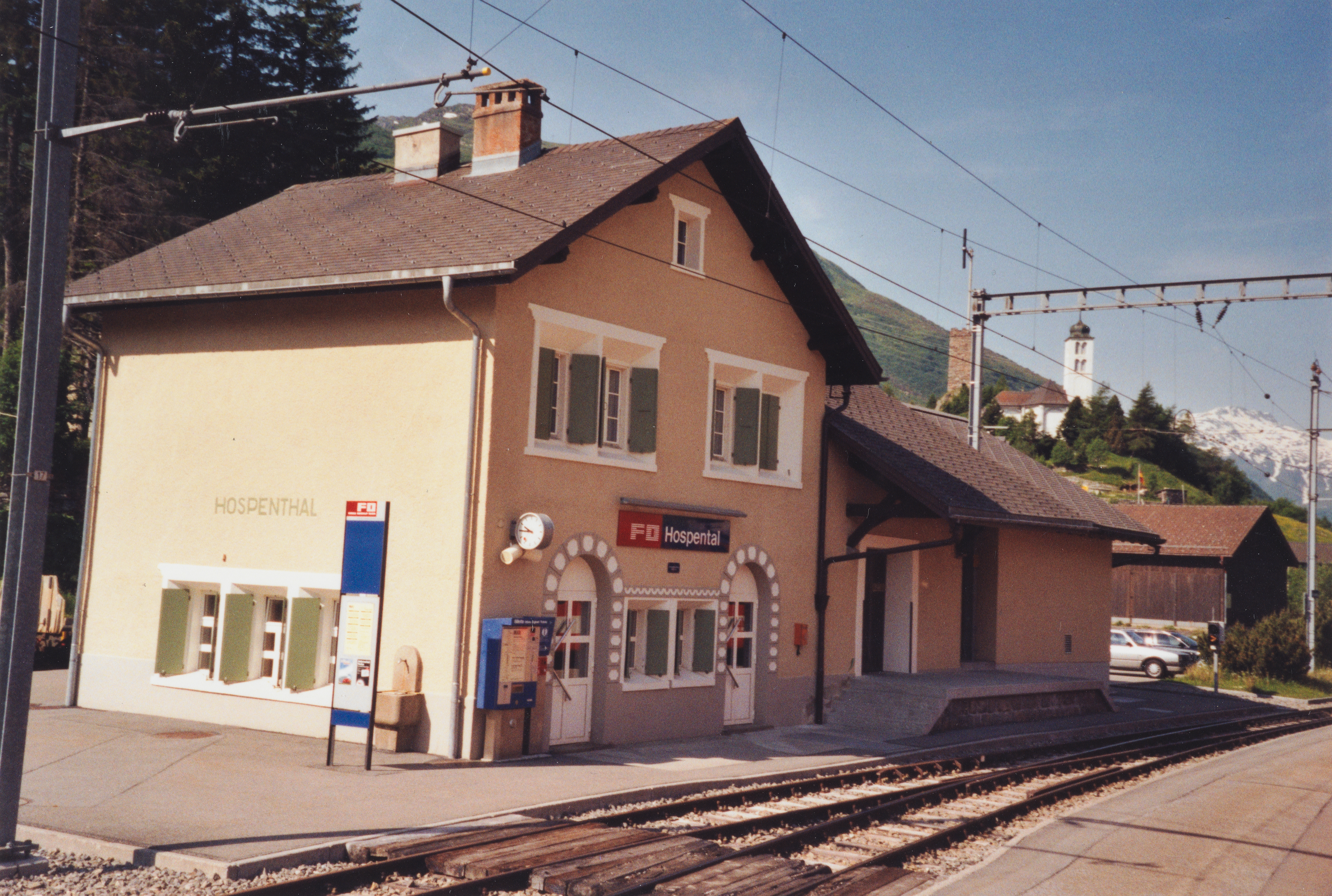
station building in 2003
