= Realp railway station =

Metre gauge station in the Canton of Uri, Switzerland

Realp
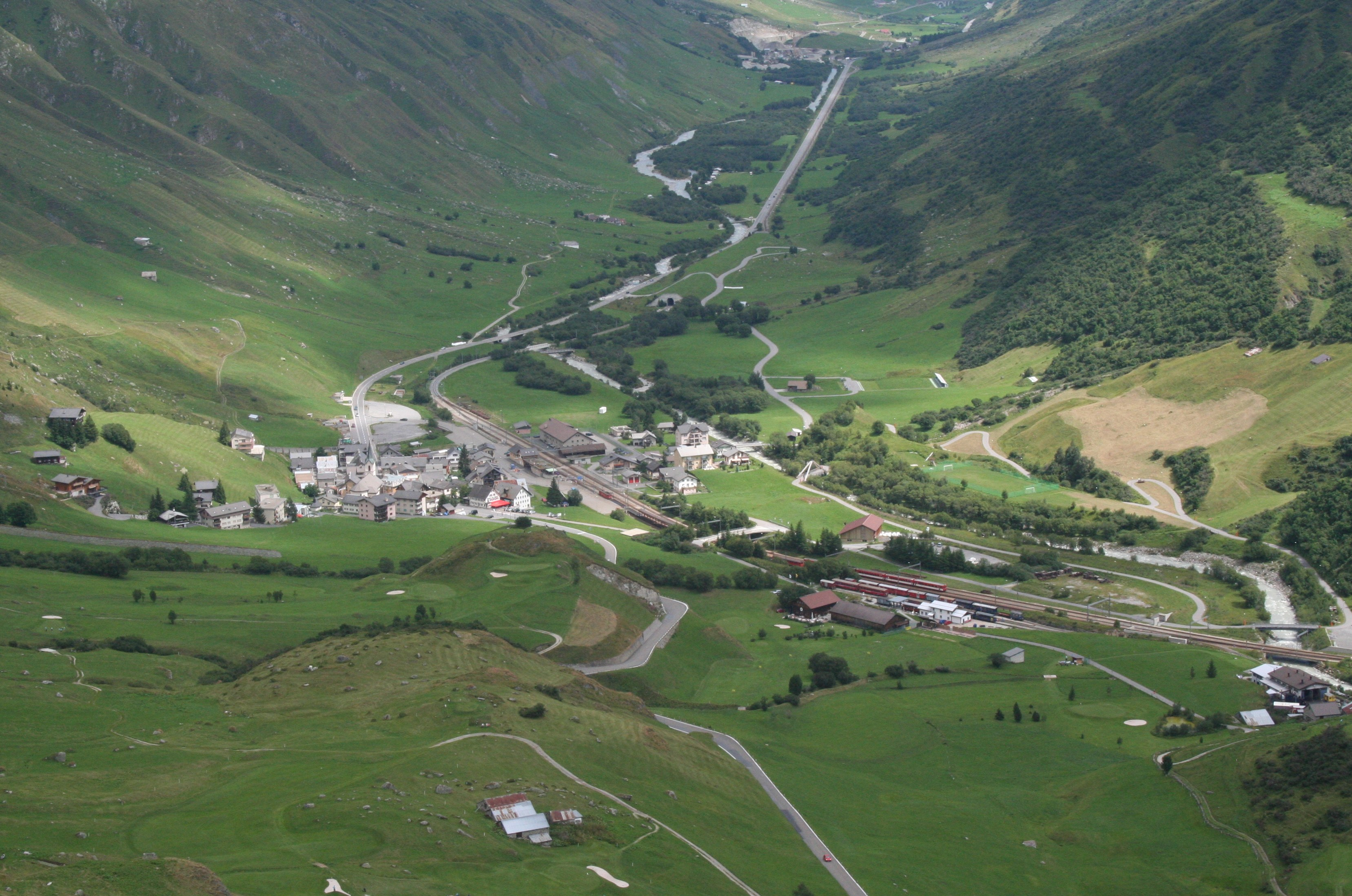
- Realp with its station in the centre

General information
- Location: Bahnhofstrasse 2 Realp; Switzerland
- Coordinates: 46°35′55″N 8°30′12″E
- Elevation: 1,537.7 m (5,045 ft)
- Owner: Matterhorn Gotthard Bahn
- Line: Furka Oberalp line
- Train operators: Matterhorn Gotthard Bahn
- Connections: Local buses

History
- Opened: 4 July 1926

Services
Preceding station	Matterhorn Gotthard Bahn	Following station
Oberwald towards Visp	R 43	Hospental towards Andermatt
Terminus	R 44	Hospental towards Göschenen
Oberwald Terminus	Furka car shuttle train	Terminus
Location
- Location within Switzerland

Realp railway station is a metre gauge station serving the municipality of Realp, in the Canton of Uri, Switzerland. The station is close to the eastern portal of the Furka Base Tunnel, on the Matterhorn Gotthard Bahn (MGB), which connects Brig in Valais, via Andermatt in Uri, with Göschenen, Uri, and Disentis/Mustér, Graubünden. Since 1 January 2003, the FO has been owned and operated by the Matterhorn Gotthard Bahn (MGB), following a merger between the FO and the Brig-Visp-Zermatt railway (BVZ).

Not far from Realp station is another railway station, Realp DFB, which serves the Furka Steam Railway, a heritage railway operating in summer over the part of the FO that was replaced by the Furka Base Tunnel in 1982.

== Services ==
The following services stop at Realp:

- Regio: hourly service between Visp and Andermatt.
- Frequent car shuttle trains through the Furka Base Tunnel to Oberwald.

The long-distance Glacier Express passes through Realp without stopping; the Glacier Express ceased stopping at Realp in late 2015.

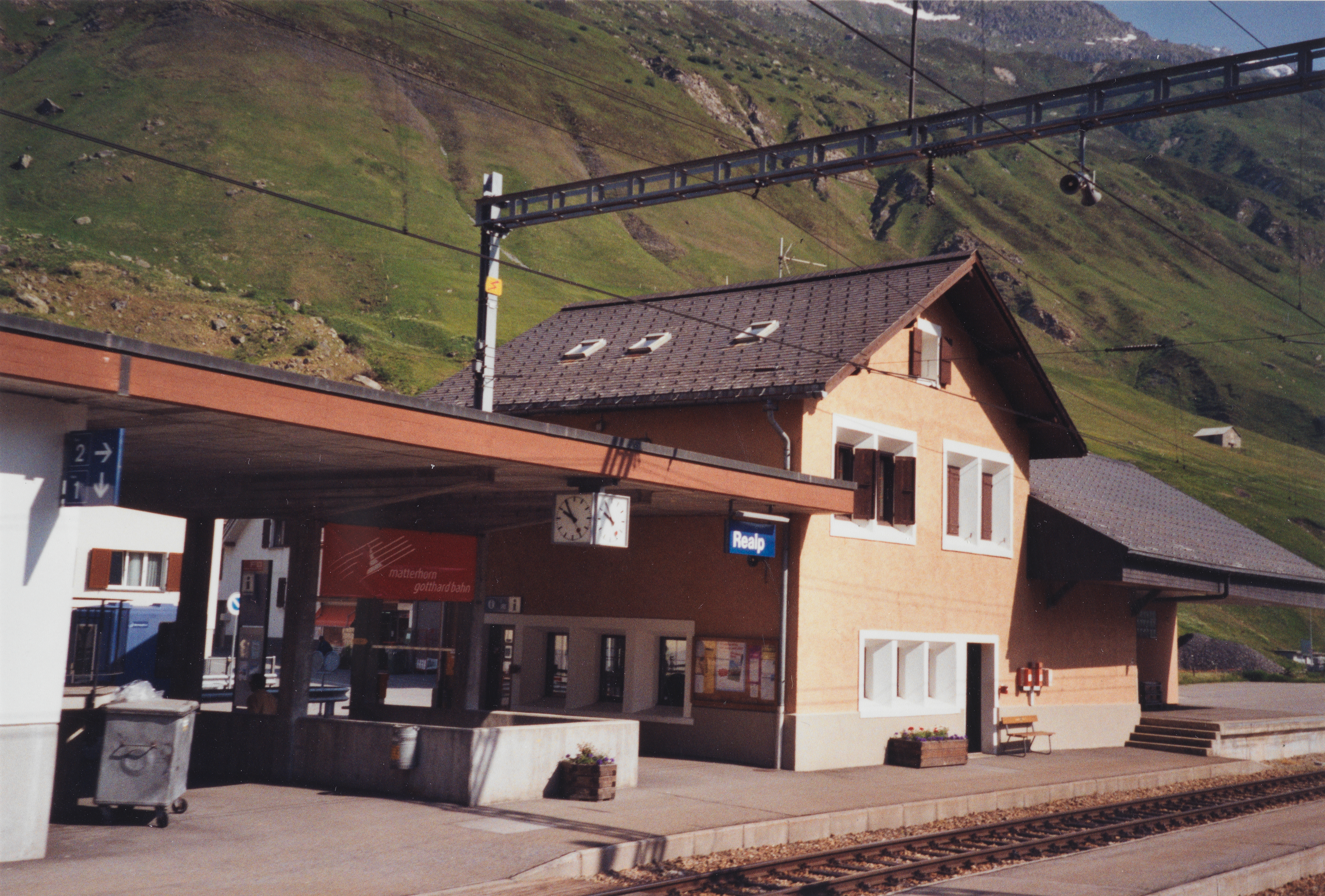
station building

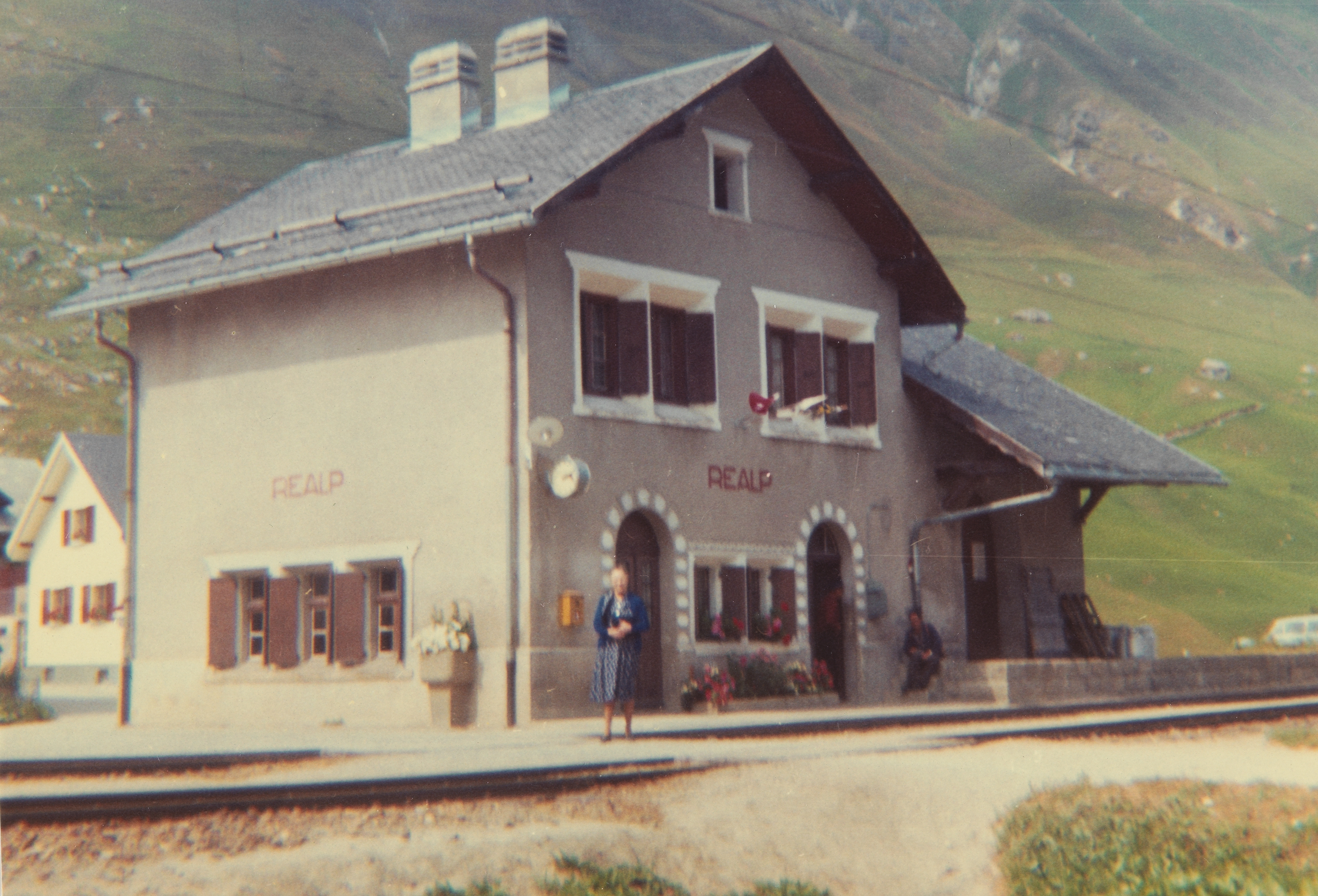
station ca. 1981

== See also ==
- Glacier Express
- Car shuttle train
- Matterhorn Gotthard Bahn
- Furka Base Tunnel
- Furka Oberalp Bahn
