= Realp =

- Municipality
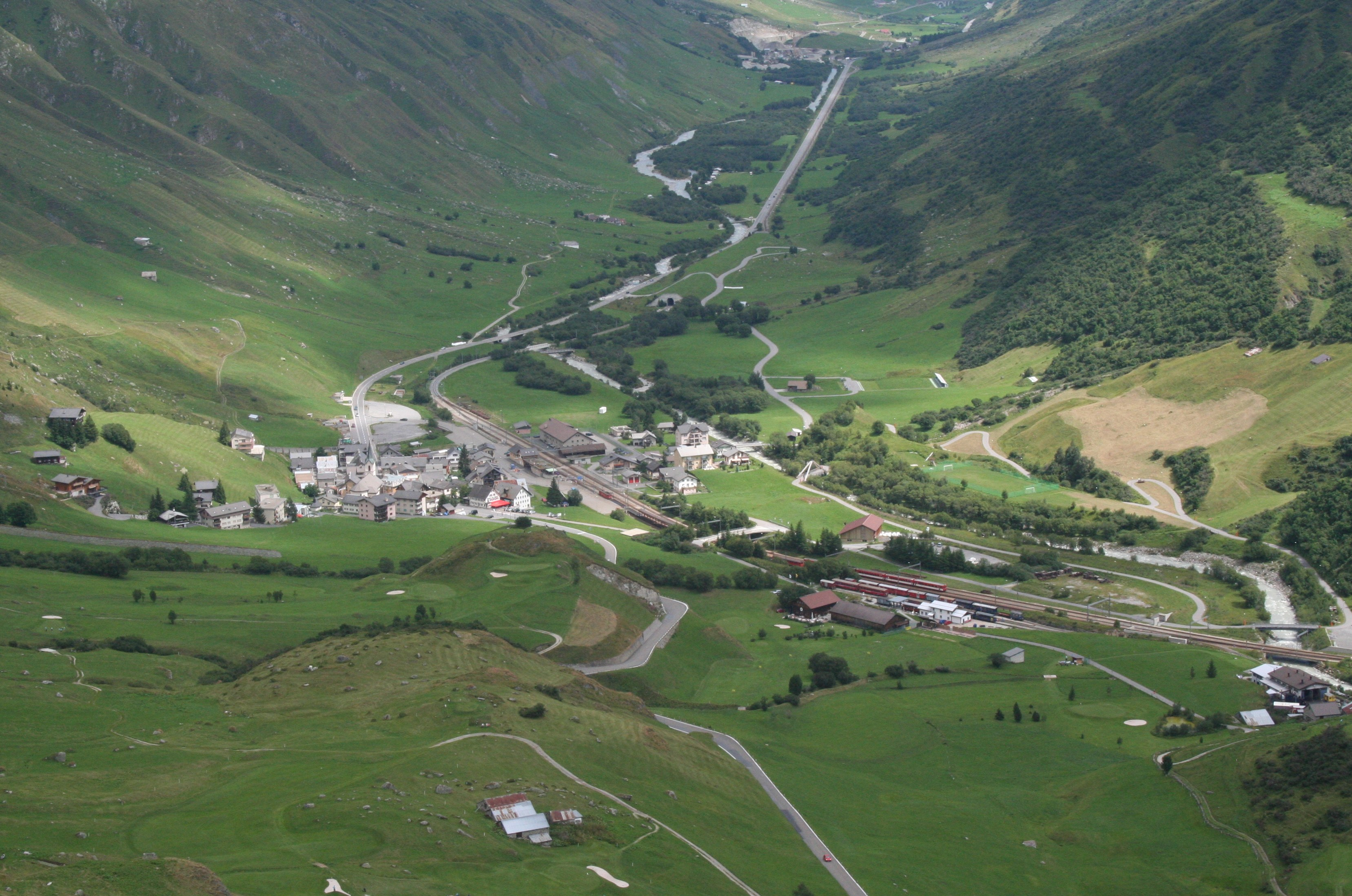
- View of Realp from above

- Coat of arms
- Location of Realp
- Location within Switzerland Location within Canton of Uri
- Coordinates: 46°35′N 8°30′E
- Country: Switzerland
- Canton: Uri
- District: n.a.

Area
  - Total: 77.97 km^{2} (30.10 sq mi)
- Elevation: 1,538 m (5,046 ft)

Population (December 2020)
  - Total: 142
  - Density: 1.82/km^{2} (4.72/sq mi)
- Time zone: UTC+01:00 (CET)
  - Summer (DST): UTC+02:00 (CEST)
- Postal code: 6491
- SFOS number: 1212
- ISO 3166 code: CH-UR
- Surrounded by: Airolo (TI), Bedretto (TI), Göschenen, Hospental, Oberwald (VS)
- Website: www.realp.ch

Realp (archaic Urnerdeutsch: Frialp) is a municipality in the canton of Uri in Switzerland.

== History ==
Realp is first mentioned in 1363 as Riealb.

== Geography ==
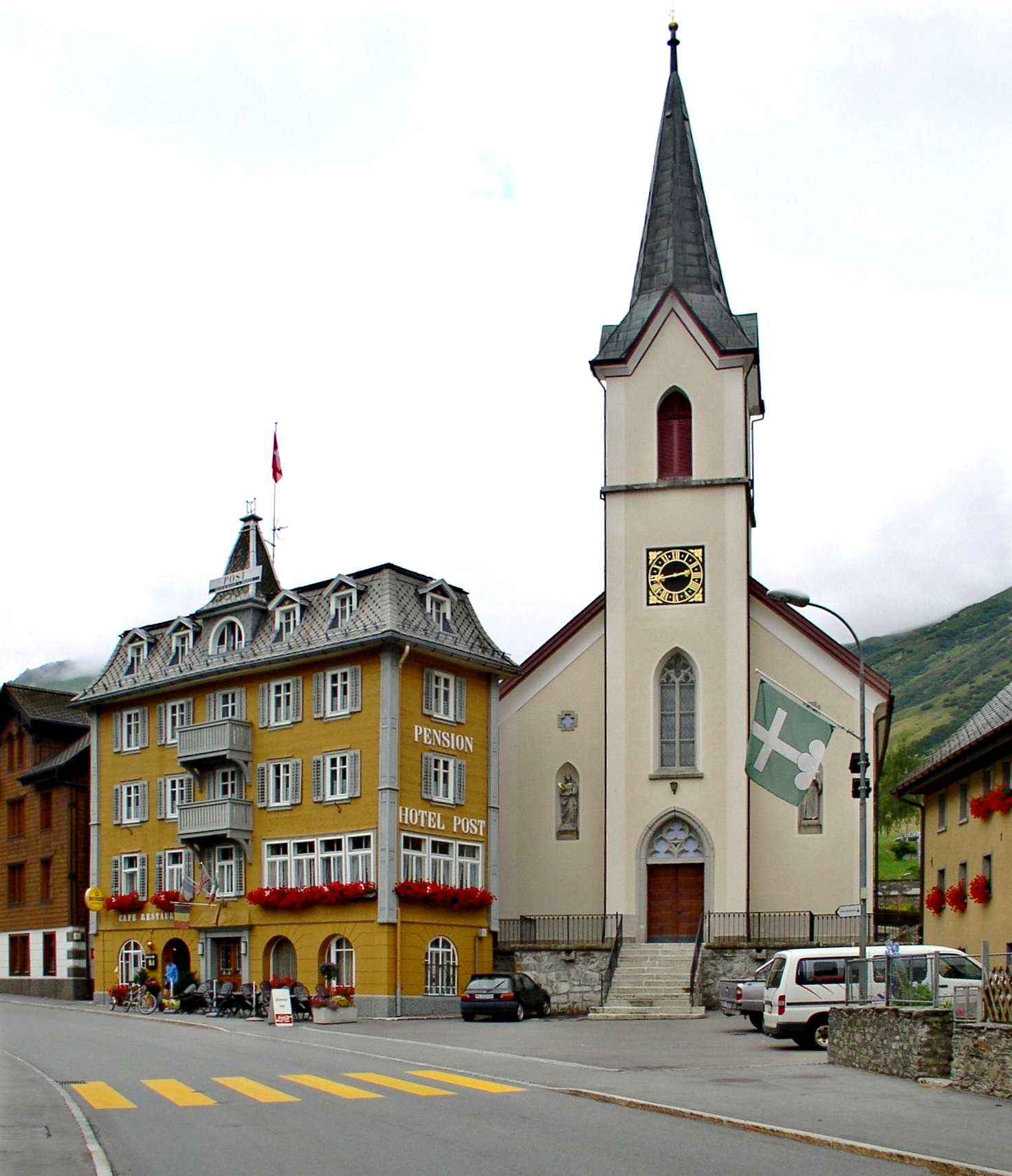
Village center of Realp

Realp has an area, as of 2006, of 78 km^{2} (30 sq mi). Of this area, 41.6% is used for agricultural purposes, while 2.3% is forested. Of the rest of the land, 0.6% is settled (buildings or roads) and the remainder (55.4%) is non-productive (rivers, glaciers or mountains). In the 1993/94 land survey, 0.2% of the total land area was heavily forested, while 2.1% is covered in small trees and shrubbery. Of the agricultural land, 1.6% is used for orchards or vine crops and 40.0% is used for alpine pastures. Of the settled areas, 0.1% is covered with buildings, and 0.5% is transportation infrastructure. Of the unproductive areas, 0.1% is unproductive standing water (ponds or lakes), 1.1% is unproductive flowing water (rivers), 43.3% is too rocky for vegetation, and 10.9% is other unproductive land.

The municipality is located on the rise into the Furka Pass.

== Demographics ==
Realp has a population (as of 31 December 2020) of 142. As of 2007, 7.8% of the population was made up of foreign nationals. Over the last 10 years the population has decreased at a rate of -22.7%. All of the population (as of 2000) speaks German. As of 2007 the gender distribution of the population was 50.3% male and 49.7% female.

In the 2007 federal election the FDP party received 96.2% of the vote.

In Realp about 50% of the population (between age 25-64) have completed either non-mandatory upper secondary education or additional higher education (either university or a Fachhochschule).

Realp has an unemployment rate of 0.74%. As of 2005, there were 8 people employed in the primary economic sector and about 5 businesses involved in this sector. people are employed in the secondary sector and there are businesses in this sector. 63 people are employed in the tertiary sector, with 16 businesses in this sector.

The historical population is given in the following table:

| year | population |
|---|---|
| 1799 | 170 |
| 1850 | 203 |
| 1900 | 208 |
| 1980 | 308 |
| 2000 | 146 |
| 2005 | 161 |
| 2007 | 153 |
| 2008 | 153 |
| 2010 | 144 |
| 2013 | 148 |
| 2014 | 143 |

== Ski area ==
Realp has a small T-bar with a beginner run. It is part of the Skiarena Andermatt-Sedrun. Nearby there is cross-country skiing, and a biathlon course.

== Transport ==
The municipality is served by two railway stations; Realp, and Realp DFB on the heritage railway.
