= HGe 4/4 II =

Swiss rack and adhesion locomotive

HGe 4/4 ^{II}
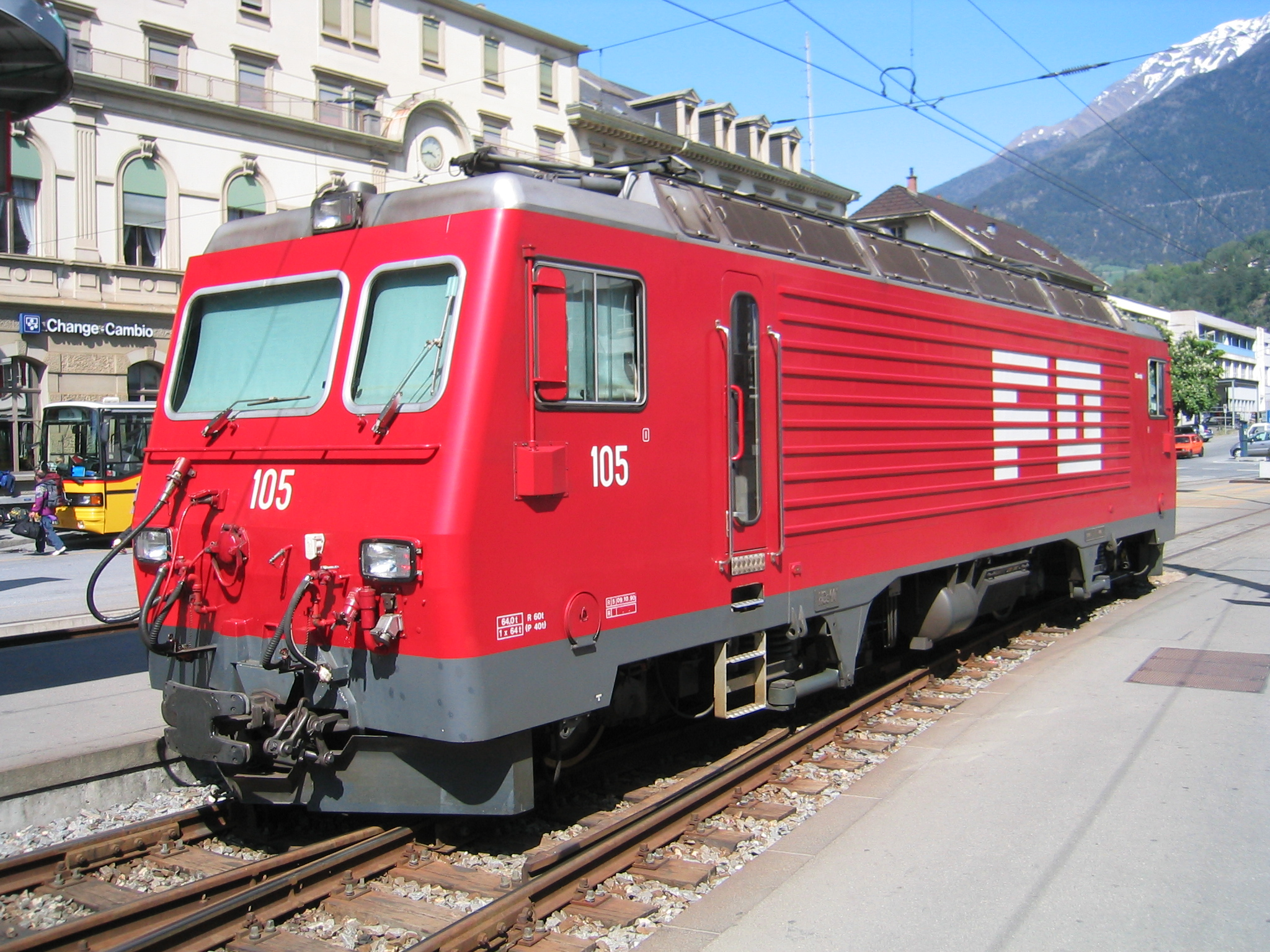
- An FO HGe 4/4 ^{II} in Brig
Type and origin
- Power type: Electric
- Builder: SLM, BBC / ABB
- Total produced: Prototype: 5 Series production: 16
Specifications
- Configuration
  - UIC: Bo′Bo′
- Gauge: 1,000 mm (3 ft 3 3/8 in)
- Length: SBB-CFF-FFS / zb: 14,800 mm (48 ft 7 in); FO / BVZ / MGB: 14,776 mm (48 ft 6 in)
- Loco weight: SBB-CFF-FFS / zb: 63 tonnes (138,900 lb); FO / BVZ / MGB: 64 tonnes (141,100 lb)
- Electric system/s: SBB-CFF-FFS / zb: 15 kV 16.7 Hz AC; FO / BVZ / MGB: 11 kV 16.7 Hz AC
- Current pickup(s): Overhead
Performance figures
- Maximum speed: Adhesion: 100 km/h (62 mph); Cogwheel: 40 km/h (25 mph)
- Power output: 1,932 kW (2,590 hp)
- Tractive effort: Adhesion: 230 kN (51,710 lbf); Cogwheel: 280 kN (62,950 lbf)
Career
- Operators: SBB-CFF-FFS / Zentralbahn; Furka Oberalp Bahn; BVZ Zermatt-Bahn; Matterhorn Gotthard Bahn
- Locale: Switzerland
- First run: 1985

The HGe 4/4 ^{II} is a combined adhesion and cogwheel-equipped electric locomotive used on a number of metre gauge railways in Switzerland since 1985.

An initial series of five prototypes was procured by a consortium made up of the Furka Oberalp Bahn (FO) and the SBB-CFF-FFS, which wanted them for the Brünigbahn, now known as the Zentralbahn (zb). Once the type had been proven, the members of the consortium ordered a total of 11 series production units, and the Brig-Visp-Zermatt-Bahn (BVZ) ordered another five such units.

The class is so named because it was the second class of locomotives of the Swiss locomotive and railcar classification type HGe 4/4 to be acquired by each of the three railway companies that procured it. According to that classification system, HGe 4/4 denotes a narrow gauge cogwheel-equipped electric locomotive with a total of four axles, all of which are drive axles.

== List of locomotives ==
Operator	Number	In service	Name	Notes
SBB	1951	1985	(none)	prototype, to FO *)
SBB	1952	1985	(none)	prototype, to FO *)
SBB / zb	101 961-1	1989	Horw	
SBB / zb	101 962-9	1989	Hergiswil	
SBB / zb	101 963-7	1989	Alpnach	
SBB / zb	101 964-5	1990	Sachseln	
SBB / zb	101 965-2	1990	Lungern	
SBB / zb	101 966-0	1990	Brünig-Hasliberg	
SBB / zb	101 967-8	1990	Brienz	*)
SBB / zb	101 968-6	1990	Ringgenberg	*)
FO / MGB	101	1986	Ville de Sion / Sitten	prototype
FO / MGB	102	1986	Altdorf	prototype
FO / MGB	103	1986	Chur / Marcau da Cuera	prototype
FO / MGB	104	1985/90	Furka	former SBB-CFF-FFS 1951 *)
FO / MGB	105	1985/90	Oberalp / Alp Su	former SBB-CFF-FFS 1952 *)
FO / MGB	106	1990	St. Gotthard / S. Gottardo	
FO / MGB	107	1990	Grimsel	
FO / MGB	108	1990	Channel Tunnel ex Nufenen / Novena	
BVZ / MGB	1	1990	Matterhorn	
BVZ / MGB	2	1990	Monte Rosa	
BVZ / MGB	3	1990	Dom	
BVZ / MGB	4	1990	Täschhorn	
BVZ / MGB	5	1990	Mount Fuji ex Dent Blanche	

*) The chassis of locomotives 1951 and 1952 were fitted with new bogies (Abt system) and transformers (11 kV) and delivered to the FO as nos. 104 and 105. The prototype bogies (Riggenbach system) and transformers (15 kV) salvaged from those chassis were then fitted to the last two series production locomotives delivered to the SBB-CFF-FFS Brünigbahn.

== See also ==
- History of rail transport in Switzerland
- Rail transport in Switzerland
