= Rhaetian Railway Ge 4/4 II =

Class of electric locomotives

Rhaetian Railway Ge 4/4 ^{II}
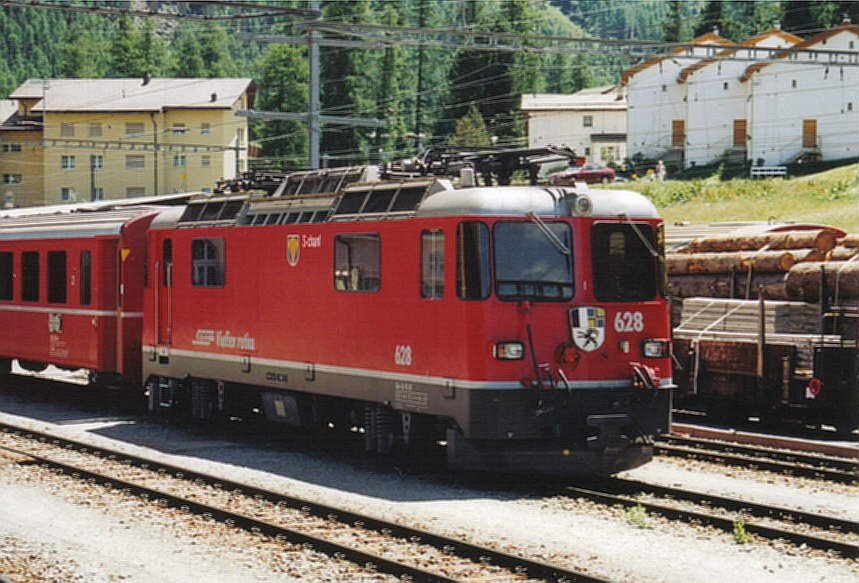
- Ge 4/4 ^{II} 628 S-chanf
Type and origin
- Power type: Electric
- Builder: SLM and BBC
- Build date: 1973, 1984
- Total produced: 23
Specifications
- Configuration
  - UIC: Bo′Bo′
- Gauge: 1,000 mm (3 ft 3 3/8 in)
- Length: 12,960 mm (42 ft 6 in)
- Width: 2,650 mm (8 ft 8 in)
- Loco weight: 50 tonnes (49.2 long tons; 55.1 short tons)
- Electric system/s: 11 kV 16.7 Hz AC Overhead
- Current pickup: Pantograph
- Traction motors: Four (type 6 FHO 4338)
Performance figures
- Maximum speed: 90 km/h (56 mph)
- Power output: 1,650 kW (2,210 hp)
- Tractive effort: 179 kN (40,240 lbf)
Career
- Operators: Rhaetian Railway
- Numbers: 611–633
- Locale: Graubünden, Switzerland
- Delivered: 1973–1985
- Disposition: All still in service, one will be preserved in the future.

The Rhaetian Railway Ge 4/4 ^{II} is a class of metre gauge Bo′Bo′ electric locomotives operated by the Rhaetian Railway (RhB), which is the main railway network in the Canton of Graubünden, Switzerland.

The class is so named because it was the second class of locomotives of the Swiss locomotive and railcar classification type Ge 4/4 to be acquired by the Rhaetian Railway. According to that classification system, Ge 4/4 denotes a narrow gauge electric adhesion locomotive with a total of four axles, all of which are drive axles.

== History ==
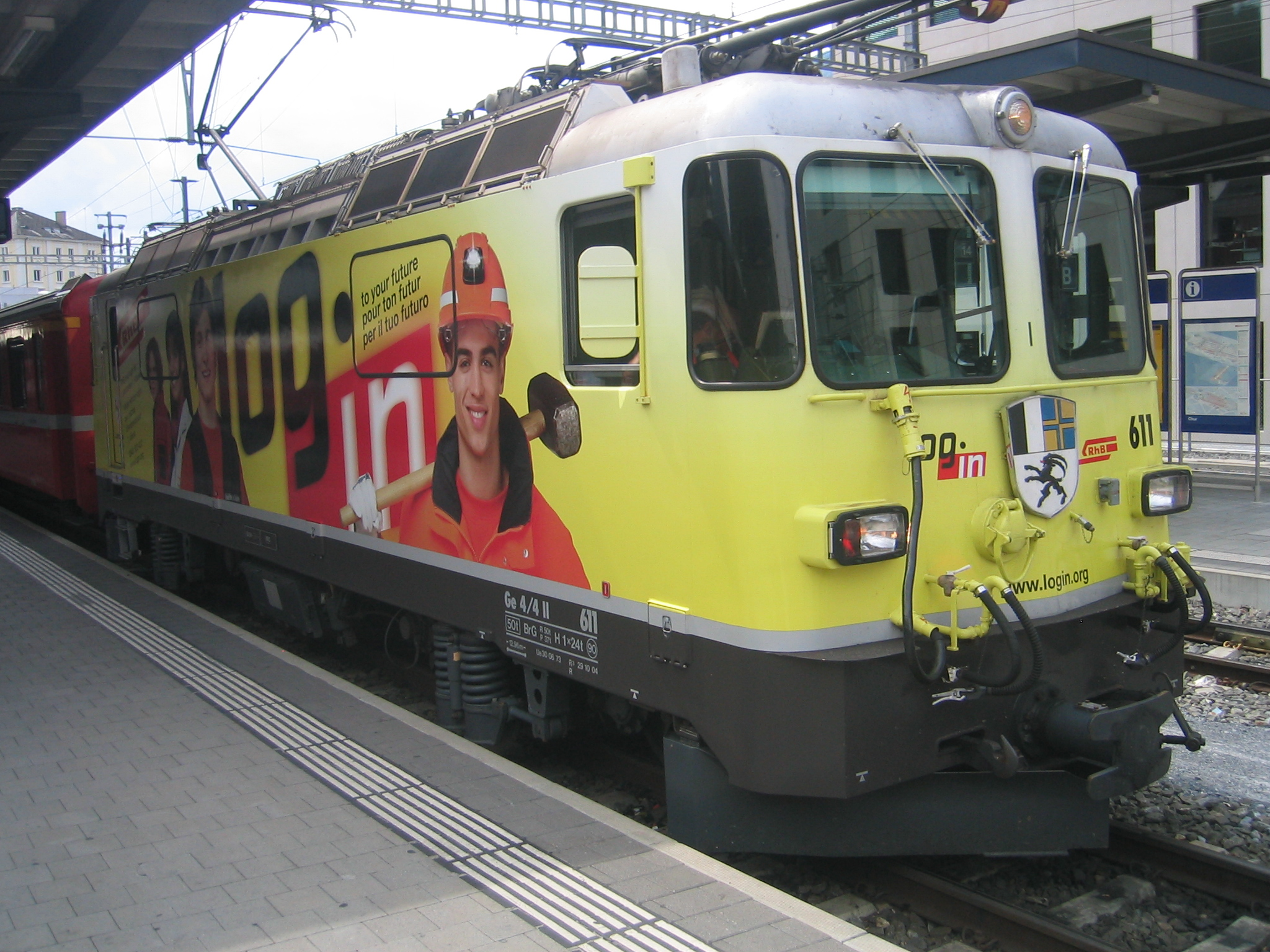
Locomotive 611 was the first example of the Ge 4/4 ^{II} to be given a promotional livery in 2008.

The 23 Ge 4/4 ^{II} locomotives, numbered 611 to 633, were placed in service in 1973 (first series) and 1984 (second series). The last example of the second series, named Zuoz and numbered 633, was completed only in 1985. The Ge 4/4 ^{II} replaced the Ge 6/6 ^{I} (Crocodile), which was becoming less and less reliable.

Ever since its delivery, the Ge 4/4 ^{II} class has been in service on the whole of the core network of the Rhaetian Railway, at the head of both passenger trains and freight trains. Since 1997, the class has also served on the Arosa Line following its conversion to 11 kV 16 2/3 Hz AC. The Ge 4/4 ^{II}s can work double headed in multiple-unit train control operation. In combination with control cars of the series BDt 1751-58, acquired in 1999, they can also operate shuttle trains.

Since 1999, some units have been given new square headlights upon being technically revised, but their appearance has otherwise remained the same.

From 2004, all 23 locomotives were fully modernised as part of a refit program, involving, amongst other things, the replacement of the analogue control electronics with modern computer supported instrumentation. The last four locomotives to be updated in this program were nos. 612, 619, 627 and 632, in 2008.

Ge 4/4 II no. 611 Landquart has been reverted to its original look with green livery and Chrome lettering in April 2024.

== Technical details ==
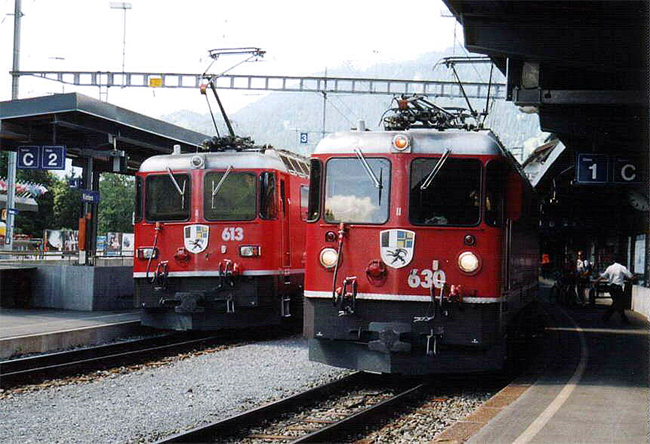
Two locomotives of class Ge 4/4 ^{II} in Klosters. At right, no 630 (Trun) in unrebuilt condition, behind it the already rebuilt no 613 (Domat/Ems) with square headlights and an altered position of the number on its nose.

In their external appearance, the Ge 4/4 ^{II} locomotives, supplied by Swiss Locomotive and Machine Works (SLM) and Brown, Boveri & Cie (BBC), are reminiscent of the Re 4/4^{II} of the Swiss Federal Railways.

The electrical componentry is nevertheless markedly different: in the Re 4/4 ^{II} locomotives, controlled rectifiers (phase fired controllers) made of thyristors and diodes supply the traction motors with wavy direct current.

In a Bo′Bo′ wheel arrangement, the Ge 4/4 ^{II} locomotives have a top speed of 90 kilometres per hour (56 mph) and weigh 50 tonnes (49 long tons; 55 short tons). Their power output is 1,700 kilowatts (2,300 hp) at 52 kilometres per hour (32 mph).

The permissible towing capacity of the class is 185 tonnes (182 long tons; 204 short tons) on a 4.5% gradient, and 245 tonnes (241 long tons; 270 short tons) on a 3.5% gradient; with double heading it is a maximum of 400 tonnes (390 long tons; 440 short tons).

== Livery ==
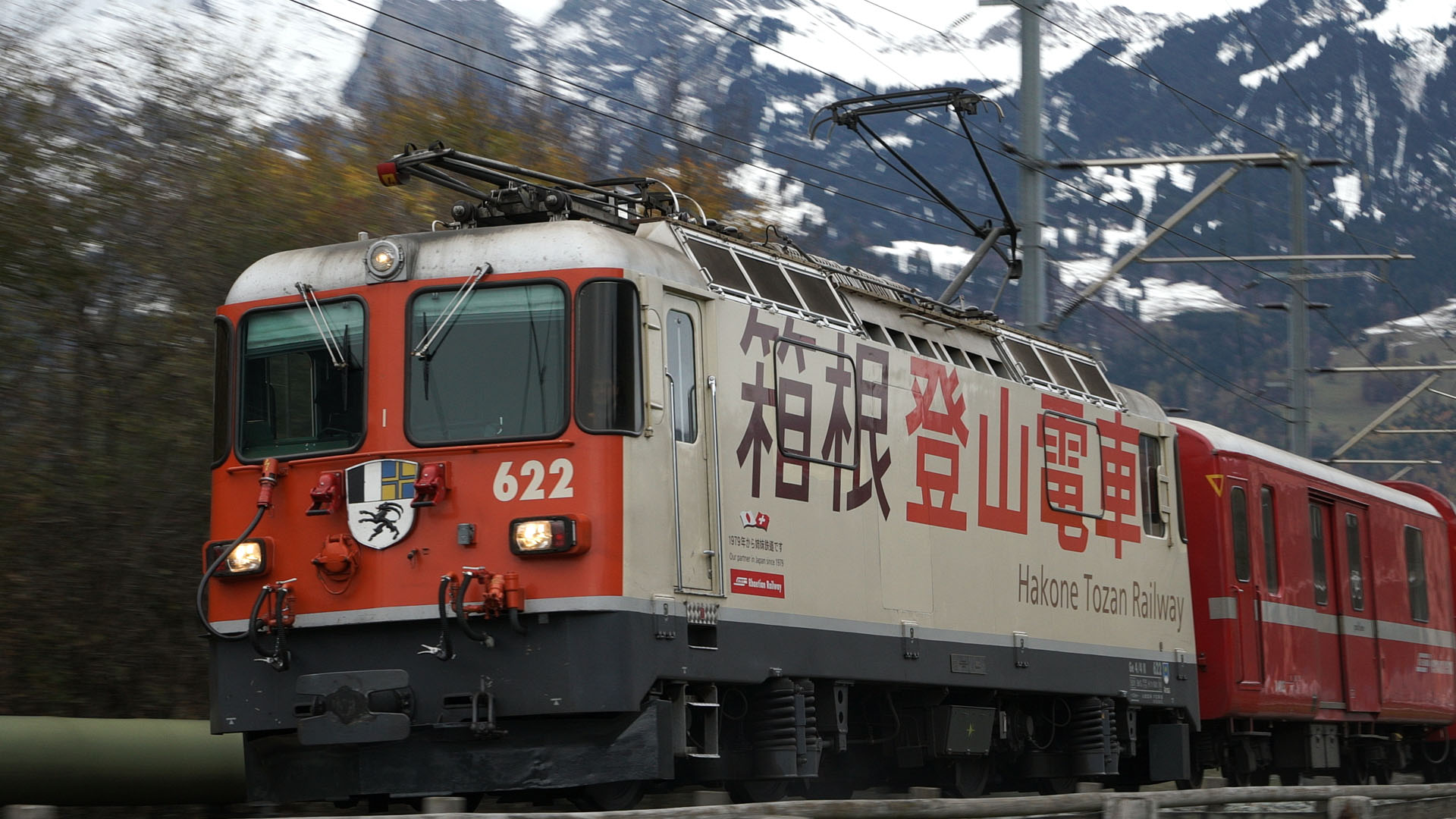
Locomotive Ge 4/4 ^{II} 622 in the livery of Japanese partner railway, the Hakone Tozan Railway

The first series of the class, nos. 611–620, were originally green liveried, but have since been reliveried in the still contemporary Rhaetian Railway standard red. The second series, numbered 621–633, was delivered already painted in the red livery.

Each individual locomotive in the class is named after a town along the Rhaetian Railway network in Graubünden. The relevant name is applied in white letters to the right and left sides near the top of the locomotive. Each locomotive's traffic number (between 611 and 633) is featured on both of its ends, and low down on both of its sides. Adjacent to its name, each locomotive also bears the coat of arms of the community after which it was named.

== List of locomotives ==
The following locomotives of the Ge 4/4 ^{II} class are in service with the Rhaetian Railway:

List of Ge 4/4 ^{II} locomotives of the Rhaetian Railway
Road number	Name	Coat of arms	Commissioning	Status	Livery / Advertisement	Notes
611	Landquart		30.05.1973	in service	Original green	
612	Thusis		20.07.1973	in service	Burkhalter Group	
613	Domat/Ems		31.07.1973	in service		
614	Schiers		14.08.1973	in service		
615	Klosters		03.09.1973	in service	Fairtiq	
616	Filisur		28.09.1973	scrapped	Steam Loco Rhaetia Donation	scrapped on April 30. 2024 due to bad condition
617	Ilanz		05.10.1973	in service		
618	Bergün/Bravuogn		05.11.1973	in service		
619	Samedan		03.12.1973	scrapped	Südostschweiz - Tageszeitung	scrapped on march 6. 2024 due to broken engine
620	Zernez		19.12.1973	in service		
621	Felsberg		09.02.1984	in service		
622	Arosa		08.03.1984	in service	Hakone Tozan Railway	
623	Bonaduz		05.04.1984	in service		
624	Celerina/Schlarigna		10.05.1984	in service		
625	Küblis		01.06.1984	in service		
626	Malans		28.06.1984	in service	Alpine Classic Pullman Express	
627	Reichenau-Tamins		02.08.1984	in service		
628	S-chanf		30.08.1984	scrapped		Damaged in a collision with a stone near Tavanasa in the Vorderrhein Valley on May 14, 2019, dismantled and scrapped on October 10, 2019.
629	Tiefencastel		04.10.1984	in service		
630	Trun		31.10.1984	in service	Advertising promotional locomotives	
631	Untervaz		30.11.1984	in service		
632	Zizers		12.12.1984	in service		(Note: On 5 January 2007, locomotive 632 (Zizers) was badly damaged by a landslide on the Chur – Ilanz section, after it became derailed near the Valenda station, and swept away parts of an avalanche gallery. According to a statement from the Rhaetian Railway rolling stock department, the locomotive was to be rebuilt with a new body on the old chassis. At the same time, the standard modifications applied under the refit program to all locomotives of the Ge 4/4 ^{II} class were to be carried out. Since 30 March 2008, the locomotive has been back on the rails, but at that time still had to undergo various test procedures before it could return to service.)
633	Zuoz		30.01.1985	in service	Radiotelevisiun Svizra Rumantscha (RTR)	

== See also ==
- A further development of this class, the FO Ge 4/4 III, was acquired in 1979 by the Furka Oberalp Bahn.
- History of rail transport in Switzerland
- Rail transport in Switzerland
- Swiss locomotive and railcar classification
