= Rack rail =

Hardware for rack-mounting electronics

A typical section of 19-inch (482.6 mm) server rack rail with dimensions noted in US inches.

A rack rail, or rack strip, is used to mount rack-mountable equipment and 19-inch rack mount accessories within a 19-inch rack. A minimum of two rack rails are required to mount equipment within a rack. The height of a rack rail is determined by the number of rack units required for mounting its equipment.

The design of racks and rack rails is specified in ECIA - EIA/ECA-310.

Each rack unit (U) is equivalent to 1 3/4 in (44 mm). Most rack rails are in sizes from 2 units high (3 1/2 in or 89 mm) to 54 units high (78 3/4 in or 2,000 mm).

== Types ==
Rack rails come in two different commonly used forms: threaded hole and square hole. Threaded (tapped) rack rails have round holes tapped for 10-32 UNF or 10-24 UNC screws. Square hole rack strips have square holes for cage nuts, available tapped for various different screw threads, that are clipped into the holes as needed to mount equipment.

In both cases, rack screws and washers are required to mount rack mount equipment to the rack rail. The size and strength of rack rail is determined by its application. Thicker steel results in a stronger rack rail, and varieties of rack rails can be found such as double angle and single angle rack rails.
