= Randa railway station =

Railway station in Randa, Switzerland

Randa
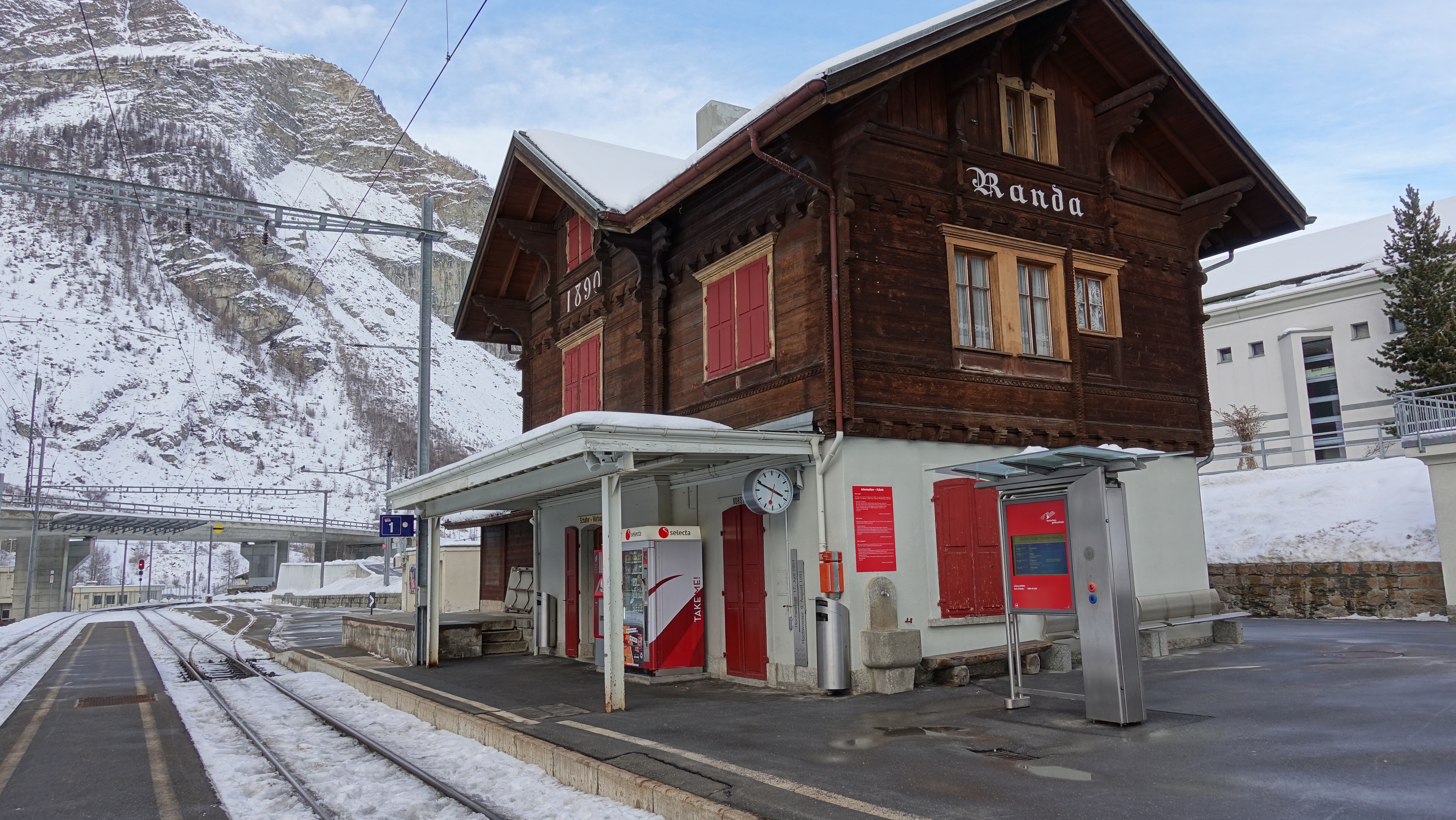
- The station building in 2017

General information
- Location: Randa; Switzerland
- Coordinates: 46°06′00″N 7°46′52″E
- Elevation: 1,406 m (4,613 ft)
- Owner: Matterhorn Gotthard Bahn
- Line: Brig–Zermatt line
- Distance: 9.93 km (6.17 mi) from Zermatt
- Platforms: 1 side platform
- Tracks: 2
- Train operators: Matterhorn Gotthard Bahn

Construction
- Accessible: No

Other information
- Station code: 8501687 (RAND)

Passengers
- 2023: 820 per weekday (MGB)

Services
Preceding station	Matterhorn Gotthard Bahn	Following station
Täsch towards Zermatt	RE 41	Herbriggen towards Visp
Täsch towards Zermatt	RE 42	Herbriggen towards Fiesch
Location

Randa railway station (German: Bahnhof Randa, French: Gare de Randa) is a railway station in the municipality of Randa, in the Swiss canton of Valais. It is an intermediate stop on the 1,000 mm (3 ft 3 3/8 in) metre gauge Brig–Zermatt line and is served by local trains only.

== Services ==
As of the December 2023 timetable change, the following services stop at Randa:

- Regio: half-hourly service between Zermatt and Visp, with every other train continuing from Visp to Fiesch.
