= Lax railway station =

Railway station in Lax, Switzerland

Lax
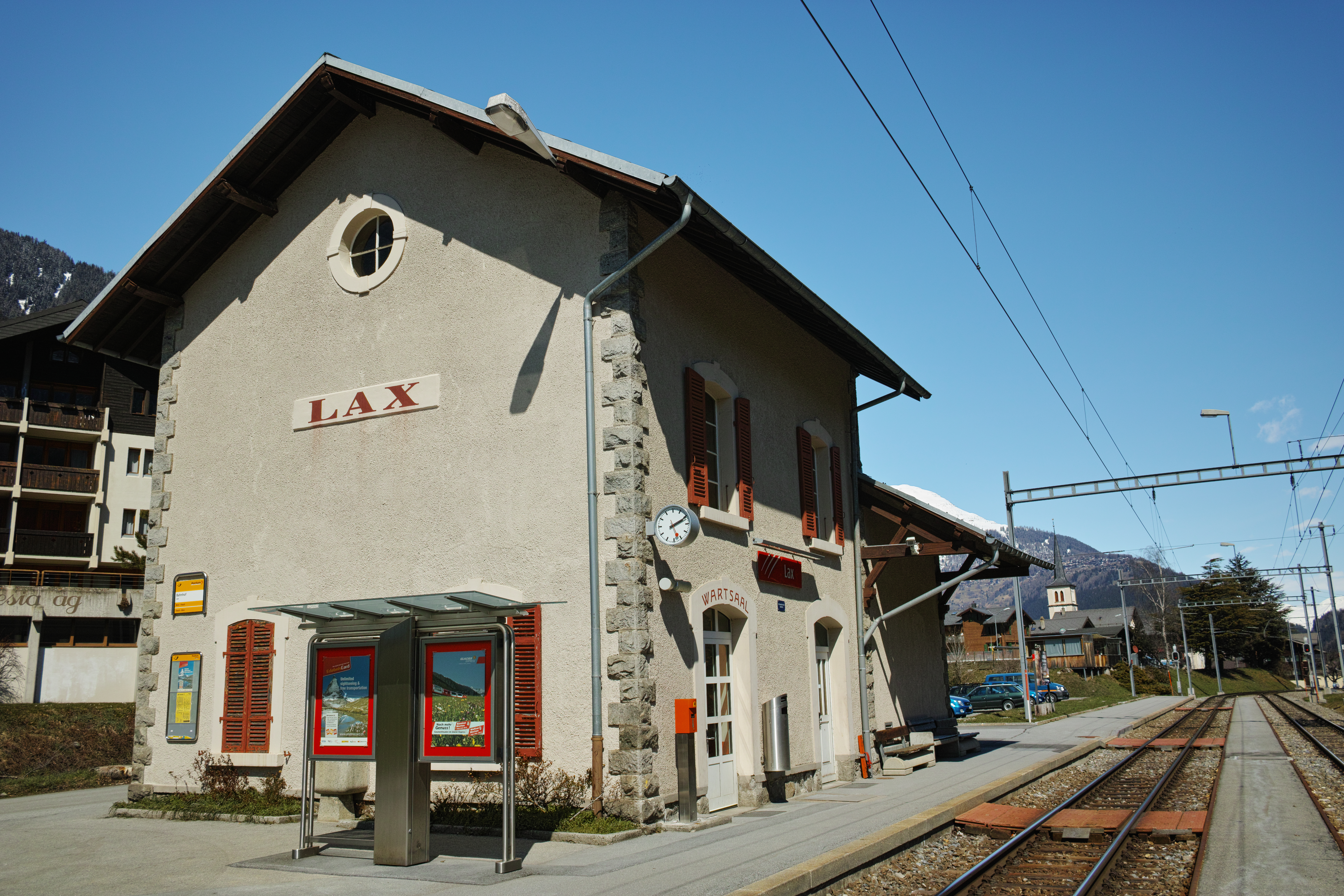
- The station building in 2015

General information
- Location: Lax; Switzerland
- Coordinates: 46°23′13″N 8°07′01″E
- Elevation: 1,045 m (3,428 ft)
- Owner: Matterhorn Gotthard Bahn
- Line: Furka Oberalp line
- Distance: 14.8 kilometres (9.2 mi) from Brig Bahnhofplatz
- Platforms: 2 side platforms
- Tracks: 2
- Train operators: Matterhorn Gotthard Bahn
- Connections: PostAuto AG bus line

Construction
- Accessible: Yes

Other information
- Station code: 8501673 (LAX)

Passengers
- 2023: 290 per weekday (MGB)

Services
Preceding station	Matterhorn Gotthard Bahn	Following station
Grengiols towards Zermatt	RE 42	Fiesch Feriendorf towards Fiesch
Grengiols towards Visp	R 43	Fiesch Feriendorf towards Andermatt
Location

Lax railway station (German: Bahnhof Lax) is a railway station in the municipality of Lax, in the Swiss canton of Valais. It is an intermediate stop on the 1,000 mm (3 ft 3 3/8 in) metre gauge Furka Oberalp line of the Matterhorn Gotthard Bahn and is served by local trains only.

== Services ==
As of the December 2023 timetable change, the following services stop at Lax:

- Regio: hourly service between Visp and Andermatt.
- RegioExpress: hourly service between Zermatt and Fiesch.
