= Grengiols railway station =

Railway station in Switzerland

Grengiols
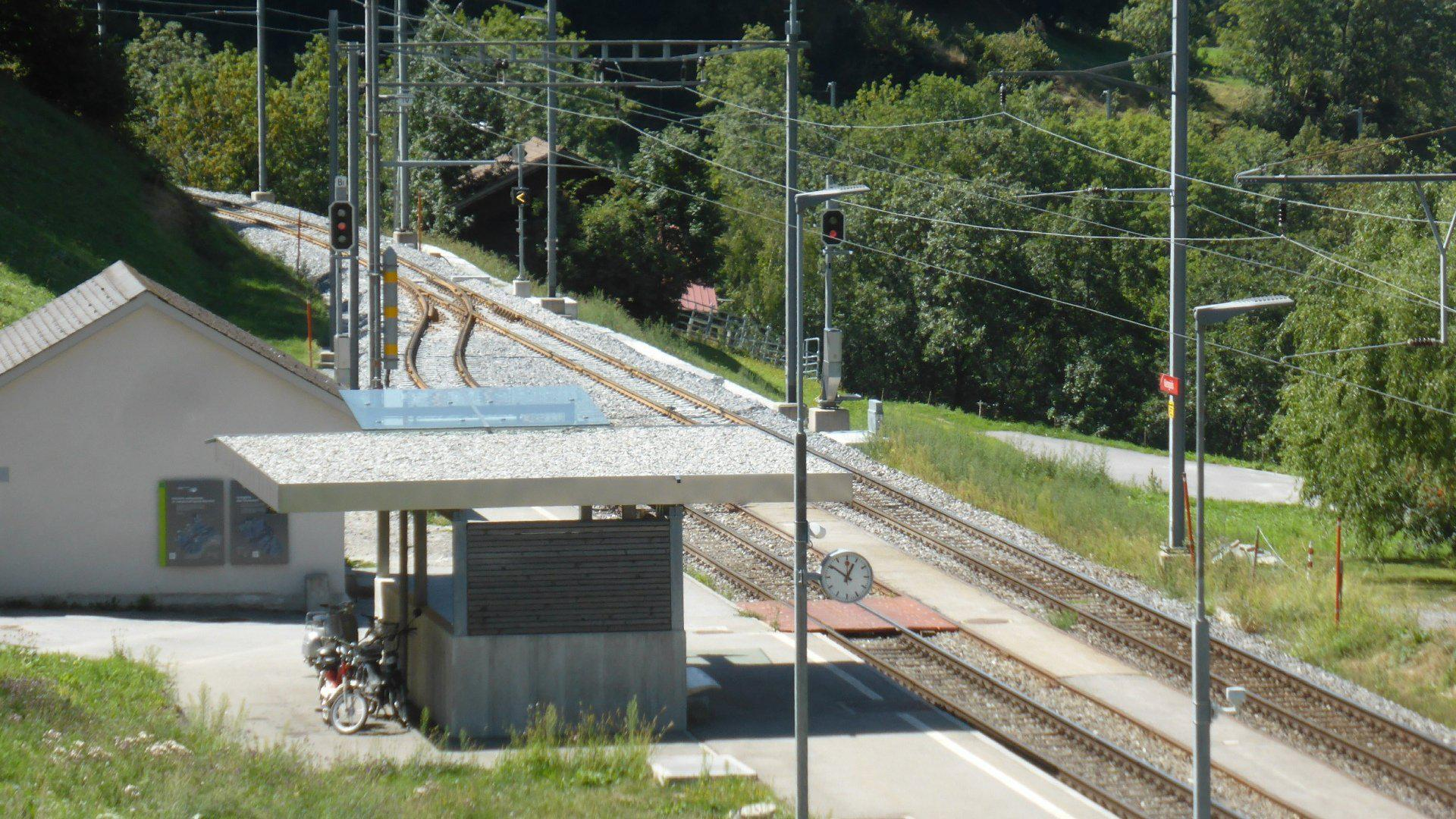
- The station platforms in 2018

General information
- Location: Grengiols; Switzerland
- Coordinates: 46°22′30″N 8°05′31″E
- Elevation: 891 m (2,923 ft)
- Owner: Matterhorn Gotthard Bahn
- Line: Furka Oberalp line
- Distance: 11.59 kilometres (7.20 mi) from Brig Bahnhofplatz
- Platforms: 2 side platforms
- Tracks: 2
- Train operators: Matterhorn Gotthard Bahn

Construction
- Accessible: Yes

Other information
- Station code: 8501674 (GREN)

Passengers
- 2023: 220 per weekday (MGB)

Services
| Preceding station | Matterhorn Gotthard Bahn | Following station |
|---|---|---|
| Betten Talstation towards Zermatt | RE 42 | Lax towards Fiesch |
| Betten Talstation towards Visp | R 43 | Lax towards Andermatt |
Location

Grengiols railway station (German: Bahnhof Grengiols) is a railway station in the municipality of Grengiols, in the Swiss canton of Valais. It is an intermediate stop on the 1,000 mm (3 ft 3 3/8 in) metre gauge Furka Oberalp line of the Matterhorn Gotthard Bahn and is served by local trains only.

== Services ==
As of the December 2023 timetable change, the following services stop at Grengiols:

- Regio: hourly service between Visp and Andermatt.
- RegioExpress: hourly service between Zermatt and Fiesch.
