= Bettmeralp Talstation railway station =

Railway station in Grengiols, Switzerland

Bettmeralp Talstation
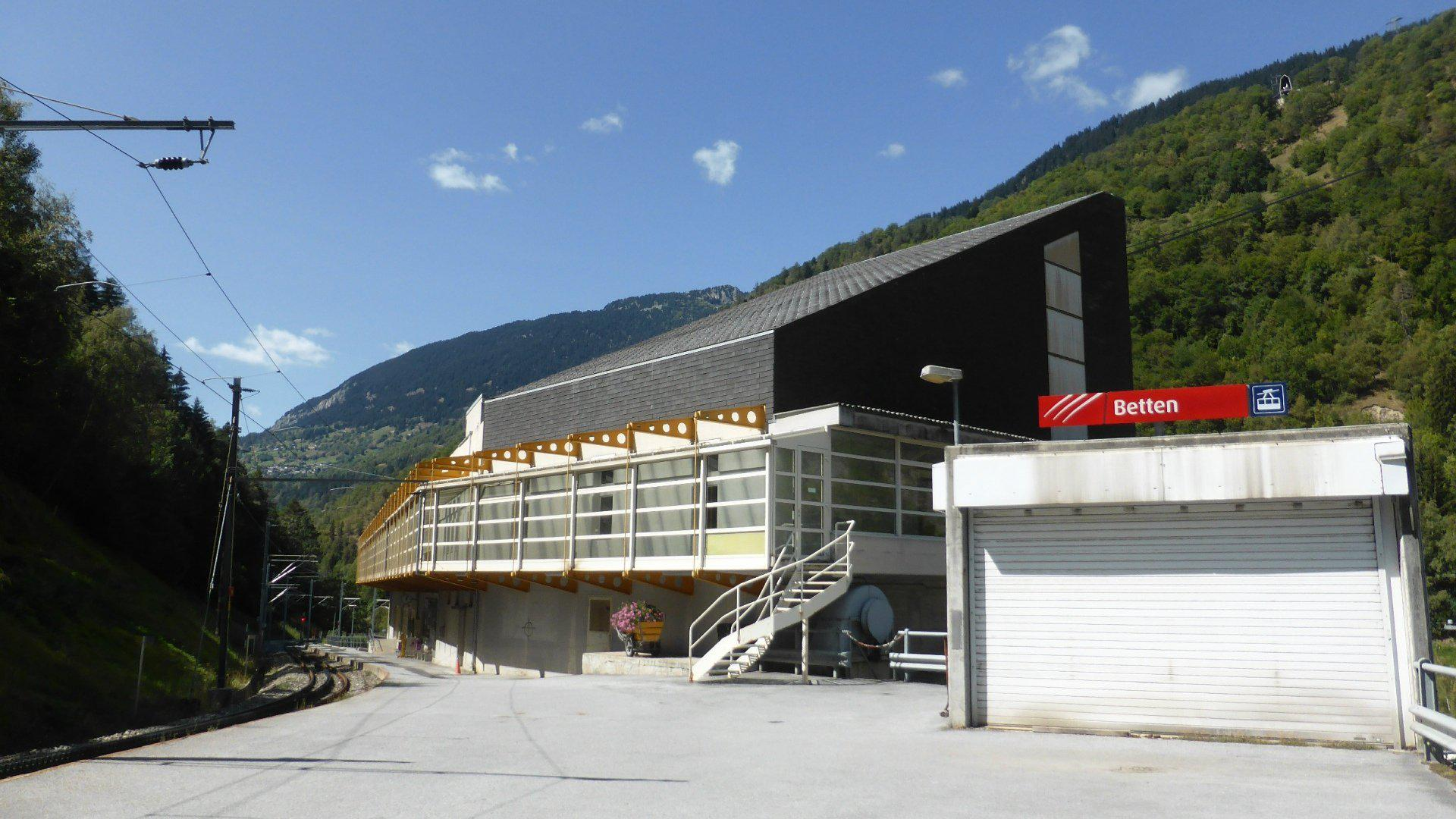
- The station building in 2018

General information
- Location: Grengiols; Switzerland
- Coordinates: 46°22′16″N 8°04′37″E
- Elevation: 829 m (2,720 ft)
- Owner: Matterhorn Gotthard Bahn
- Line: Furka Oberalp line
- Distance: 10.2 km (6.3 mi) from Brig Bahnhofplatz
- Platforms: 1 side platform
- Tracks: 1
- Train operators: Matterhorn Gotthard Bahn

Construction
- Parking: Yes
- Accessible: Yes

Other information
- Station code: 8501675 (BEMG)

Passengers
- 2023: 620 per weekday (MGB)

Services
Preceding station	Matterhorn Gotthard Bahn	Following station
Mörel towards Zermatt	RE 42	Grengiols towards Fiesch
Mörel towards Visp	R 43	Grengiols towards Andermatt
Location

Bettmeralp Talstation railway station (German: Bahnhof Bettmeralp Talstation) is a railway station in the municipality of Grengiols, in the Swiss canton of Valais. It is an intermediate stop on the 1,000 mm (3 ft 3 3/8 in) metre gauge Furka Oberalp line of the Matterhorn Gotthard Bahn and is served by local trains only. The station is adjacent to the valley station (Talstation) of the cable car to Bettmeralp. Until the December 2024 timetable change, the station was named Betten Talstation.

== Services ==
As of the December 2024 timetable change, the following services stop at Bettmeralp Talstation:

- Regio: hourly service between Visp and Andermatt.
- RegioExpress: hourly service between Zermatt and Fiesch.
