= Mörel railway station =

Railway station in Mörel-Filet, Switzerland

Mörel
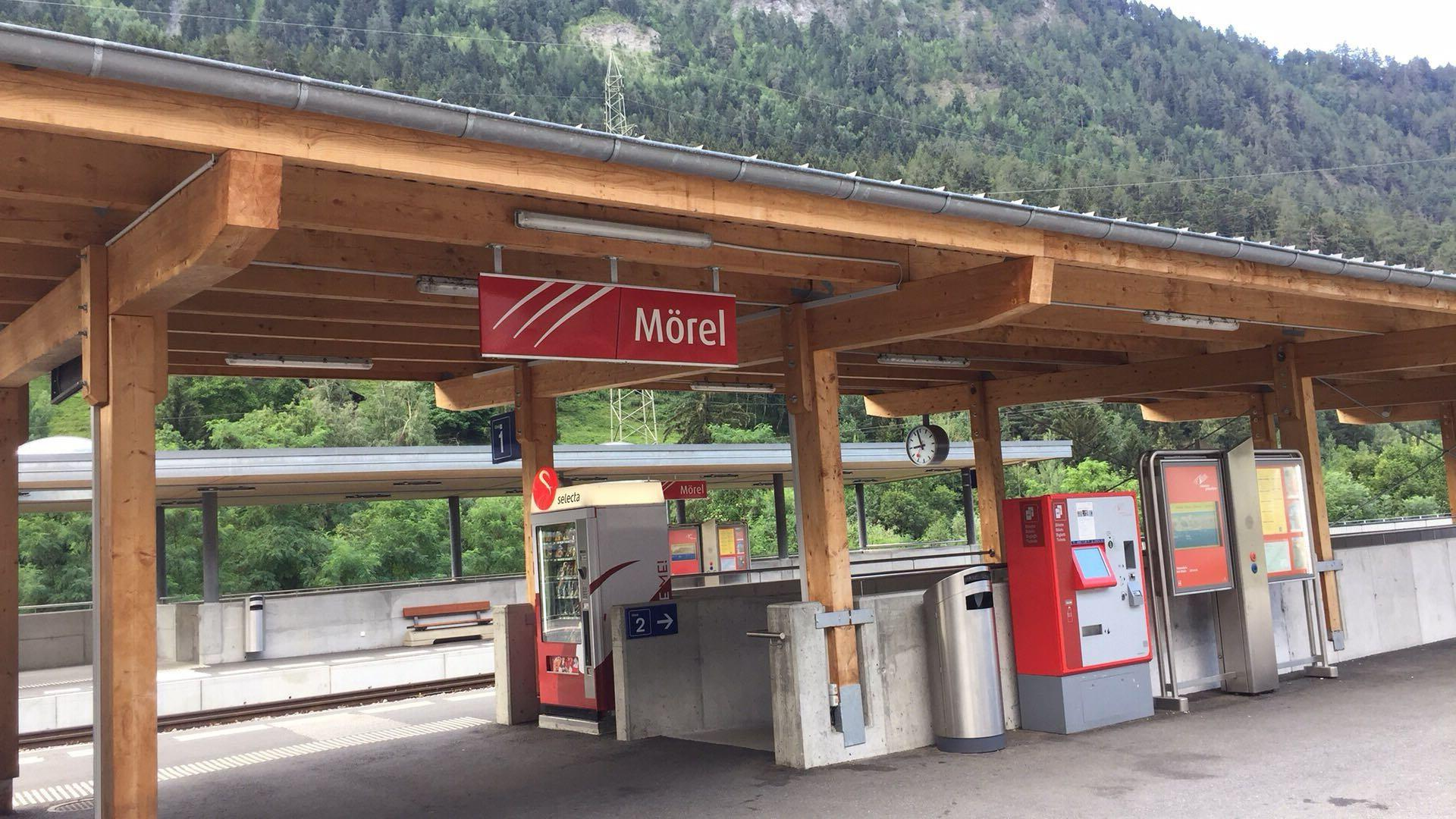
- The station platform in 2018

General information
- Location: Mörel-Filet; Switzerland
- Coordinates: 46°21′22″N 8°02′49″E
- Elevation: 759 m (2,490 ft)
- Owner: Matterhorn Gotthard Bahn
- Line: Furka Oberalp line
- Distance: 7.21 kilometres (4.48 mi) from Brig Bahnhofplatz
- Platforms: 2 side platforms
- Tracks: 2
- Train operators: Matterhorn Gotthard Bahn

Construction
- Accessible: Yes

Other information
- Station code: 8501676 (MOEL)

Passengers
- 2023: 980 per weekday (MGB)

Services
Preceding station	Matterhorn Gotthard Bahn	Following station
Bitsch towards Zermatt	RE 42	Betten Talstation towards Fiesch
Bitsch towards Visp	R 43	Betten Talstation towards Andermatt
Location

Mörel railway station (German: Bahnhof Mörel) is a railway station in the municipality of Mörel-Filet, in the Swiss canton of Valais. It is an intermediate stop on the 1,000 mm (3 ft 3 3/8 in) gauge Furka Oberalp line of the Matterhorn Gotthard Bahn and is served by local trains only.

== Services ==
As of the December 2023 timetable change, the following services stop at Mörel:

- Regio: hourly service between Visp and Andermatt.
- RegioExpress: hourly service between Zermatt and Fiesch.

== Layout and connections ==
Mörel is located on the north bank of the Rhone river in the municipality of Mörel-Filet. The valley stations of two aerial tramways, both of which serve Riederalp, are located across the Furkastrasse. The station itself has two side platforms serving two tracks. The station has limited facilities; the Matterhorn Gotthard Bahn demolished the station building in 2014, over the objections of the local government.
