= Täsch railway station =

Railway station in Täsch, Switzerland

Täsch
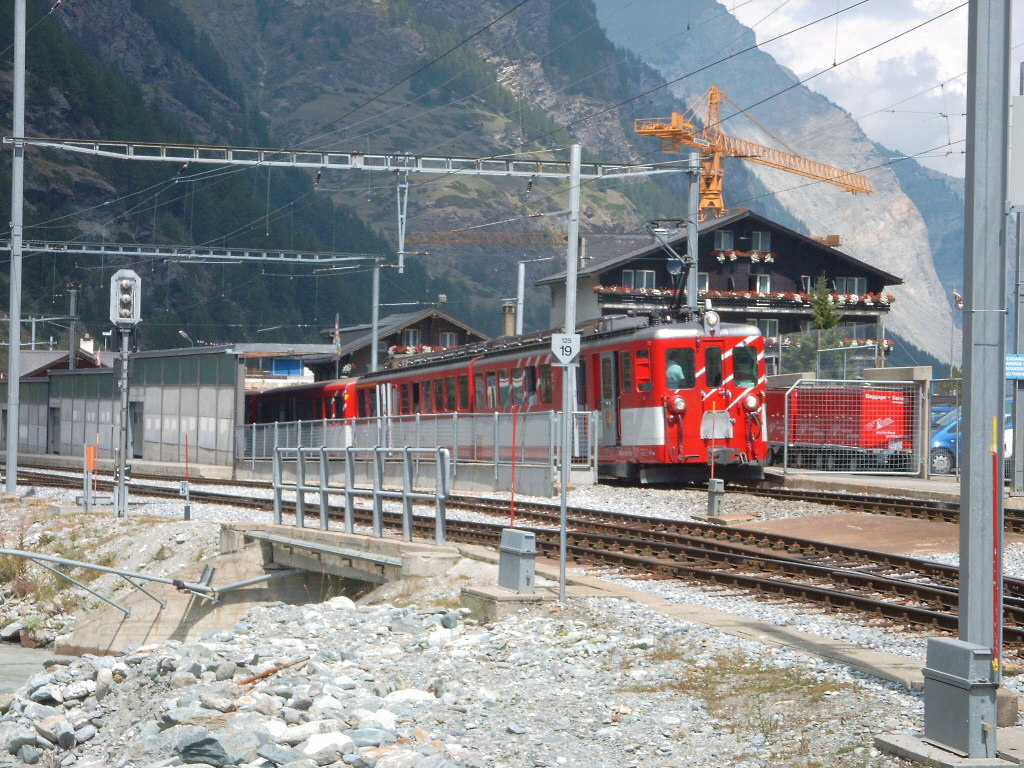
- A shuttle train at the station in 2005

General information
- Location: Neue Kantonsstrasse; Täsch; Switzerland
- Coordinates: 46°04′N 7°46′E
- Elevation: 1,438 m (4,718 ft)
- Owner: Matterhorn Gotthard Bahn
- Line: Brig–Zermatt line
- Distance: 5.61 km (3.49 mi) from Zermatt
- Platforms: 4: 2 bay platforms; 1 island platform
- Tracks: 4
- Train operators: Matterhorn Gotthard Bahn

Construction
- Parking: Matterhorn Terminal Täsch
- Accessible: Yes

Other information
- Station code: 8501688 (TAES)

History
- Opened: 18 July 1891
- Electrified: 1 October 1929

Passengers
- 2023: 810 per weekday (MGB)

Services
Preceding station	Matterhorn Gotthard Bahn	Following station
Zermatt Terminus	RE 41	Randa towards Visp
Zermatt Terminus	RE 42	Randa towards Fiesch
Zermatt Terminus	R 40	Terminus
Location

Täsch railway station is a metre gauge railway station serving the municipality of Täsch, in the Canton of Valais, Switzerland. It forms part of the Brig-Visp-Zermatt railway (BVZ), which connects the car-free mountaineering and ski resort of Zermatt with standard gauge lines at Visp (served by SBB-CFF-FFS) and Brig (served by SBB-CFF-FFS and BLS AG).

Since 1 January 2003, the BVZ has been owned and operated by the Matterhorn Gotthard Bahn (MGB), following a merger between the BVZ and the Furka Oberalp Bahn (FO).

Due to Zermatt's car free status, the MGB has a frequent special shuttle train service between Zermatt and Täsch, where people travelling to and from Zermatt by combustion-engined vehicles are required to park their vehicles. For most of most days, this service operates at 20-minute intervals. The MGB also operates regional services between Zermatt and Brig via Täsch at hourly intervals.

Every day, several Glacier Express trains, pass through this station, but do not stop.

== Services ==
As of the December 2023 timetable change, the following services stop at Täsch:

- Regio: shuttle service every twenty minutes to Zermatt.
- RegioExpress: half-hourly service between Zermatt and Visp, with every other train continuing from Visp to Fiesch.

== See also ==
- Matterhorn Gotthard Bahn
- Brig-Visp-Zermatt railway
- Täsch
- Zermatt
- Matterhorn
