= Fiesch Feriendorf railway station =

Railway station in Fiesch, Switzerland

Fiesch Feriendorf
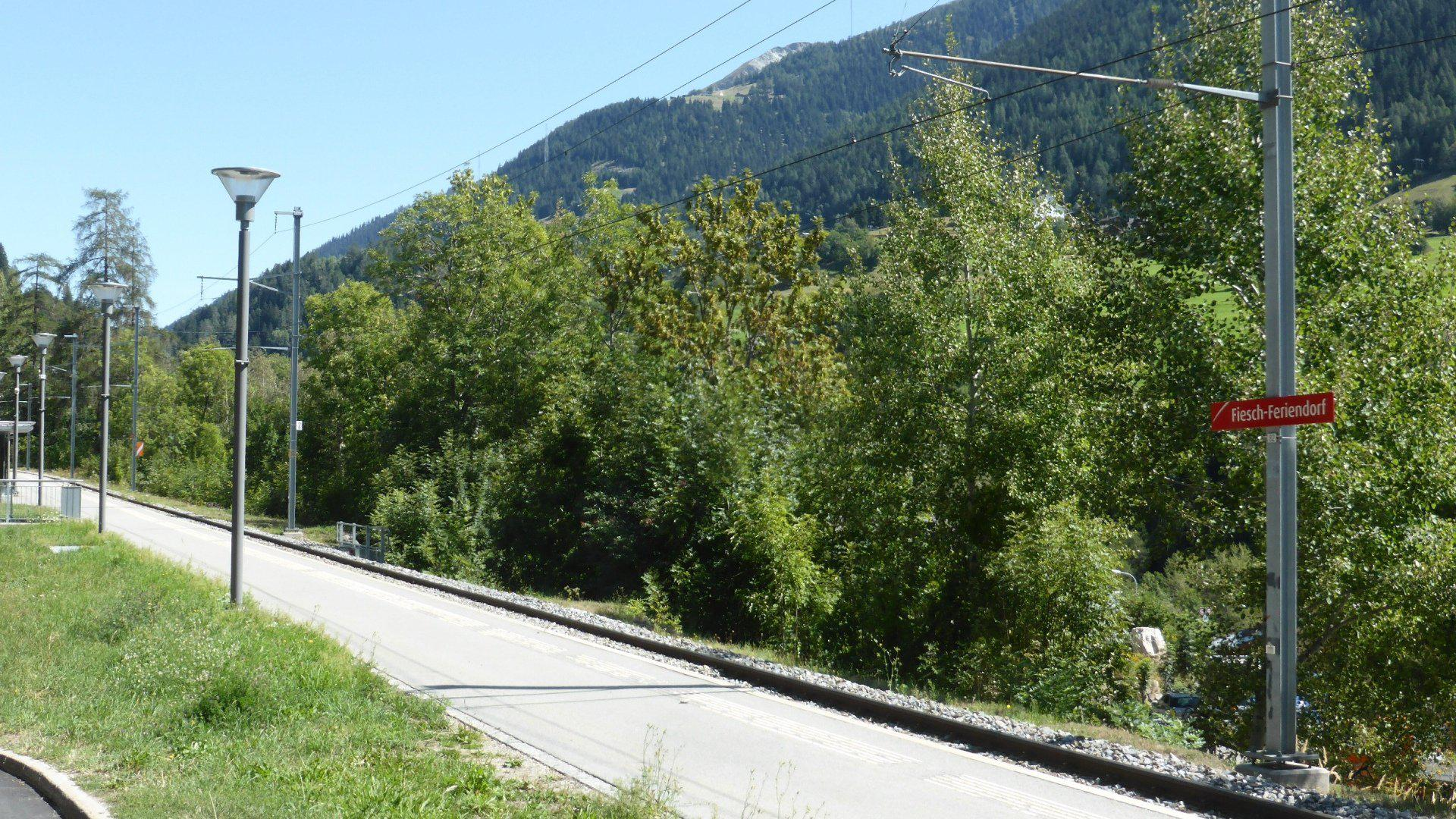
- The station platform in 2018

General information
- Location: Fiesch; Switzerland
- Coordinates: 46°23′49″N 8°07′52″E
- Elevation: 1,049 m (3,442 ft)
- Owner: Matterhorn Gotthard Bahn
- Line: Furka Oberalp line
- Distance: 16.6 kilometres (10.3 mi) from Brig Bahnhofplatz
- Platforms: 1 side platform
- Tracks: 1
- Train operators: Matterhorn Gotthard Bahn
- Connections: PostAuto AG bus line

Construction
- Accessible: Yes

Other information
- Station code: 8501729 (FIED)

History
- Former names: Fiesch Sport- & Feriencenter (2008 to 2018)

Passengers
- 2023: 320 per weekday (MGB)

Services
Preceding station	Matterhorn Gotthard Bahn	Following station
Lax towards Zermatt	RE 42	Fiesch Terminus
Lax towards Visp	R 43	Fiesch towards Andermatt
Location

Fiesch Feriendorf railway station (German: Bahnhof Fiesch Feriendorf), also known as Fiesch Sport- & Feriencenter railway station, is a railway station in the municipality of Fiesch, in the Swiss canton of Valais. It is an intermediate stop and a request stop on the 1,000 mm (3 ft 3 3/8 in) metre gauge Furka Oberalp line of the Matterhorn Gotthard Bahn and is served by local trains only.

== Services ==
As of the December 2023 timetable change, the following services stop at Fiesch Feriendorf:

- Regio: hourly service between Visp and Andermatt.
- RegioExpress: hourly service between Zermatt and Fiesch.
