= Eyholz railway station =

Railway station in Visp, Switzerland

Eyholz
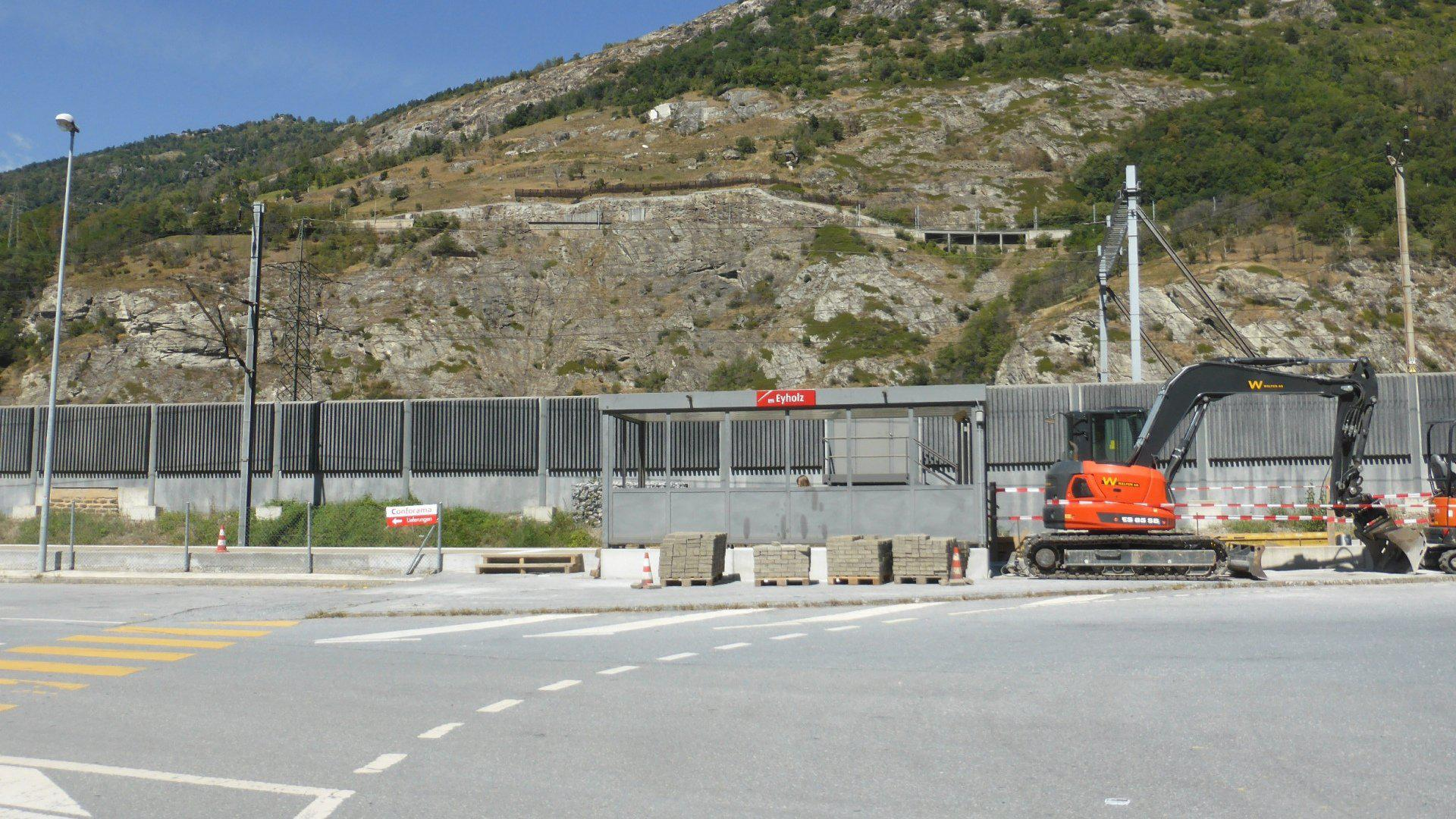
- The station shelter in 2018; behind it is the double-tracked standard gauge Simplon line

General information
- Location: Visp; Switzerland
- Coordinates: 46°17′49″N 7°54′58″E
- Elevation: 653 m (2,142 ft)
- Owner: Matterhorn Gotthard Bahn
- Line: Brig–Zermatt line
- Distance: 6.67 km (4.14 mi) from Brig Bahnhofplatz
- Platforms: 1 side platform
- Tracks: 1
- Train operators: Matterhorn Gotthard Bahn

Construction
- Accessible: Yes

Other information
- Station code: 8501636 (EYHO)

Passengers
- 2023: 1'200 per weekday (MGB)

Services
Preceding station	Matterhorn Gotthard Bahn	Following station
Visp towards Zermatt	RE 42	Brig Bahnhofplatz towards Fiesch
Visp Terminus	R 43	Brig Bahnhofplatz towards Andermatt
Location

Eyholz railway station (German: Bahnhof Eyholz) is a railway station in the municipality of Visp, in the Swiss canton of Valais. It is an intermediate stop and a request stop on the 1,000 mm (3 ft 3 3/8 in) metre gauge Brig–Zermatt line and is served by local trains only.

== Services ==
As of the December 2023 timetable change, the following services stop at Eyholz:

- Regio: hourly service between Visp and Andermatt.
- RegioExpress: hourly service between Zermatt and Fiesch.
