= Niederwald railway station =

Railway station in Goms, Switzerland

Niederwald
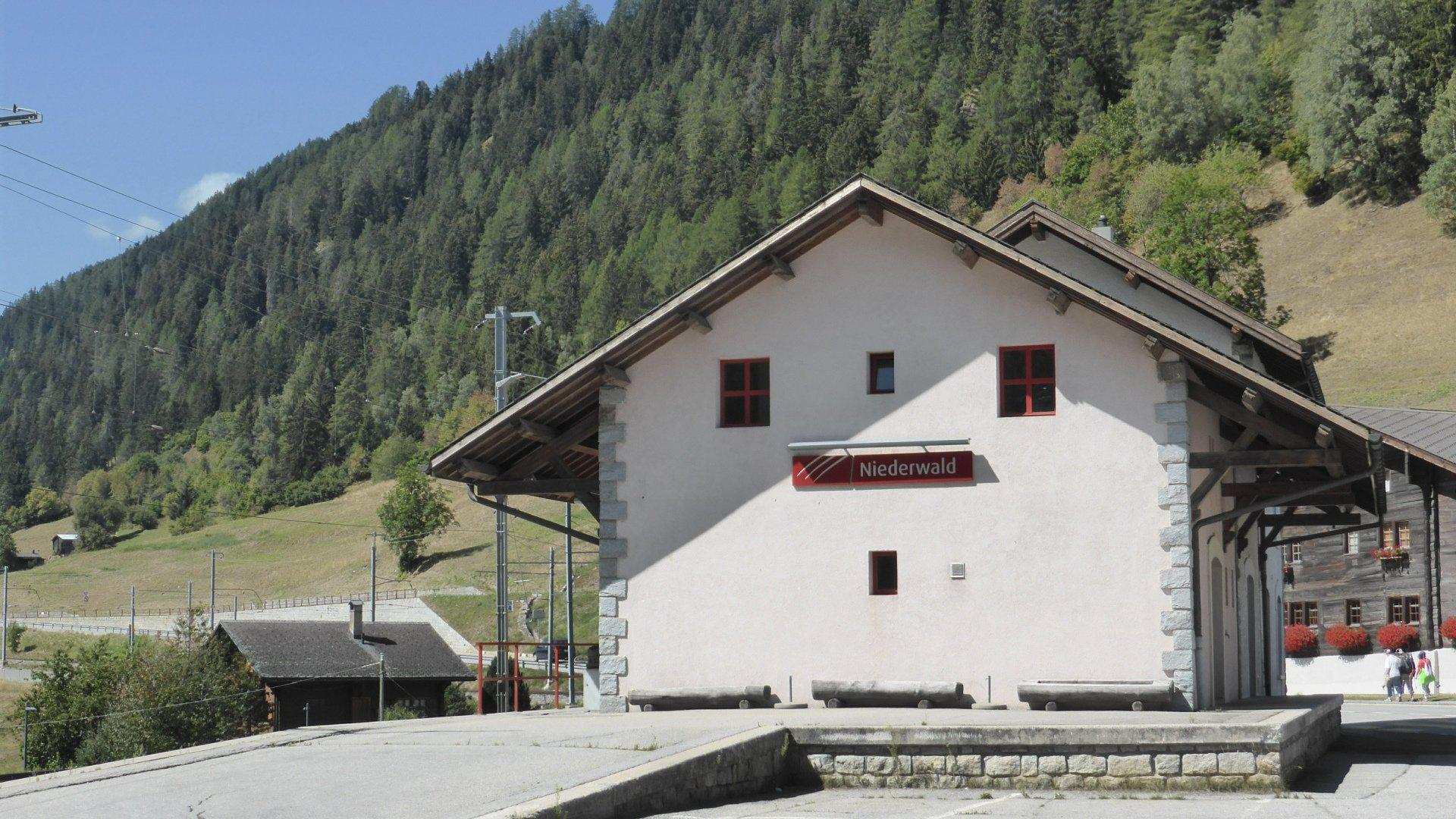
- The station building in 2018

General information
- Location: Goms; Switzerland
- Coordinates: 46°26′06″N 8°11′24″E
- Elevation: 1,243 m (4,078 ft)
- Owner: Matterhorn Gotthard Bahn
- Line: Furka Oberalp line
- Distance: 24.4 kilometres (15.2 mi) from Brig Bahnhofplatz
- Platforms: 2
- Tracks: 2
- Train operators: Matterhorn Gotthard Bahn

Construction
- Accessible: No

Other information
- Station code: 8501670 (NWAL)

Passengers
- 2023: 150 per weekday (MGB)

Services
Preceding station	Matterhorn Gotthard Bahn	Following station
Fürgangen-Bellwald Talstation towards Visp	R 43	Blitzingen towards Andermatt
Location

Niederwald railway station (German: Bahnhof Niederwald), is a railway station in the locality of Niederwald, within the municipality of Goms, in the Swiss canton of Valais. It is an intermediate stop on the 1,000 mm (3 ft 3 3/8 in) metre gauge Furka Oberalp line of the Matterhorn Gotthard Bahn and is served by local trains only.

== Services ==
As of the December 2023 timetable change, the following services stop at Niederwald:

- Regio: hourly service between Visp and Andermatt.
