= Fürgangen-Bellwald Talstation railway station =

Railway station in Bellwald, Switzerland

Fürgangen-Bellwald Talstation
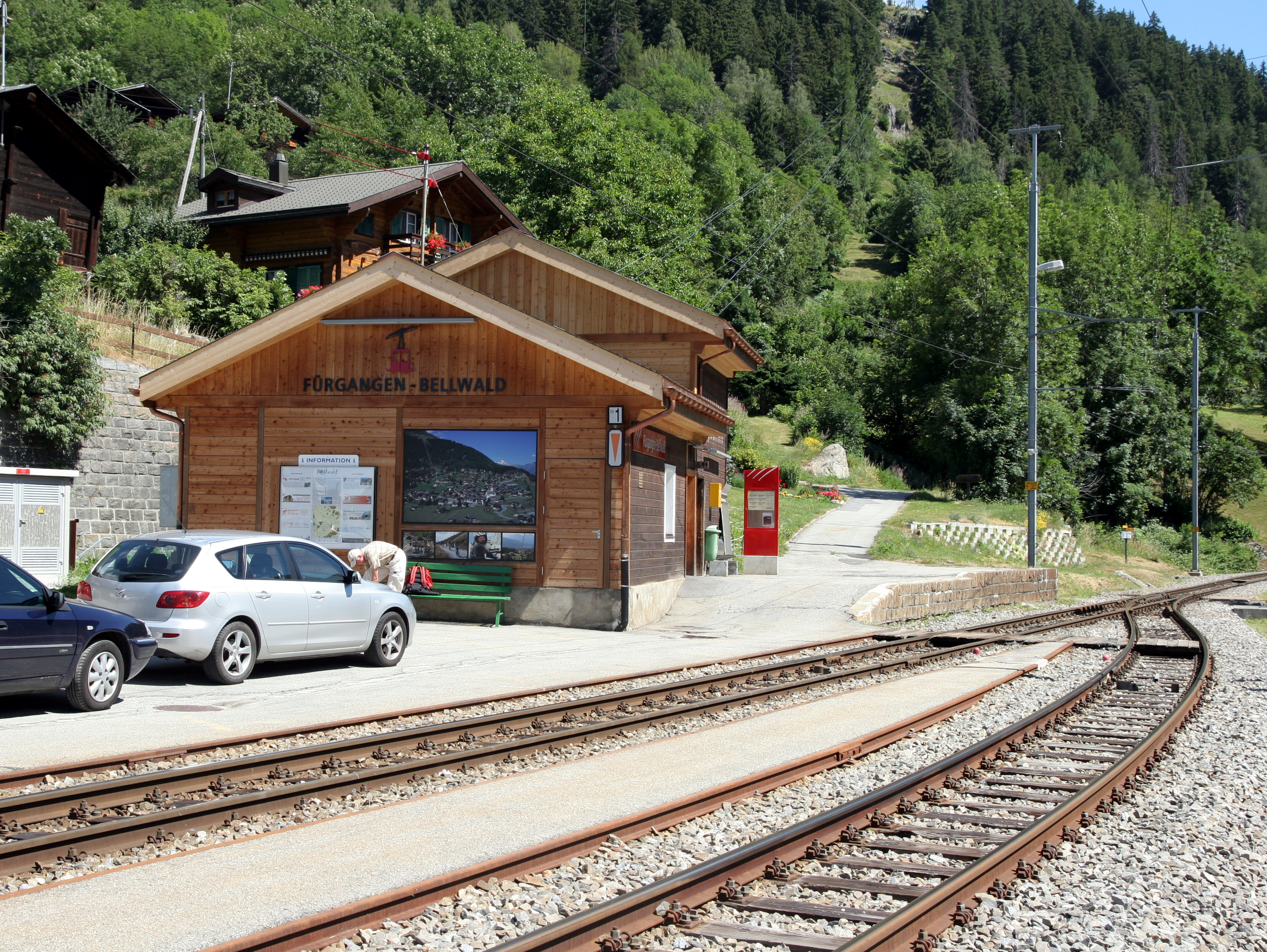
- The station building in 2010

General information
- Location: Bellwald; Switzerland
- Coordinates: 46°24′43″N 8°09′07″E
- Elevation: 1,202 m (3,944 ft)
- Owner: Matterhorn Gotthard Bahn
- Line: Furka Oberalp line
- Distance: 20.4 kilometres (12.7 mi) from Brig Bahnhofplatz
- Platforms: 2
- Tracks: 2
- Train operators: Matterhorn Gotthard Bahn

Construction
- Accessible: No

Other information
- Station code: 8501671 (FUER)

History
- Former names: Fürgangen-Bellwald (until 2008)

Passengers
- 2023: 320 per weekday (MGB)

Services
Preceding station	Matterhorn Gotthard Bahn	Following station
Fiesch towards Visp	R 43	Niederwald towards Andermatt
Location

Fürgangen-Bellwald Talstation railway station (German: Bahnhof Fürgangen-Bellwald Talstation), is a railway station in the municipality of Bellwald, in the Swiss canton of Valais. It is an intermediate stop on the 1,000 mm (3 ft 3 3/8 in) metre gauge Furka Oberalp line of the Matterhorn Gotthard Bahn and is served by local trains only. The station is adjacent to the valley station (German: Talstation) of the aerial tramway to Bellwald.

== Services ==
As of the December 2023 timetable change, the following services stop at Fürgangen-Bellwald Talstation:

- Regio: hourly service between Visp and Andermatt.
