= Glacier Express =

Train connecting the Swiss railway stations of Zermatt and St. Moritz

Coordinates: 46°35′42″N 9°45′36″E

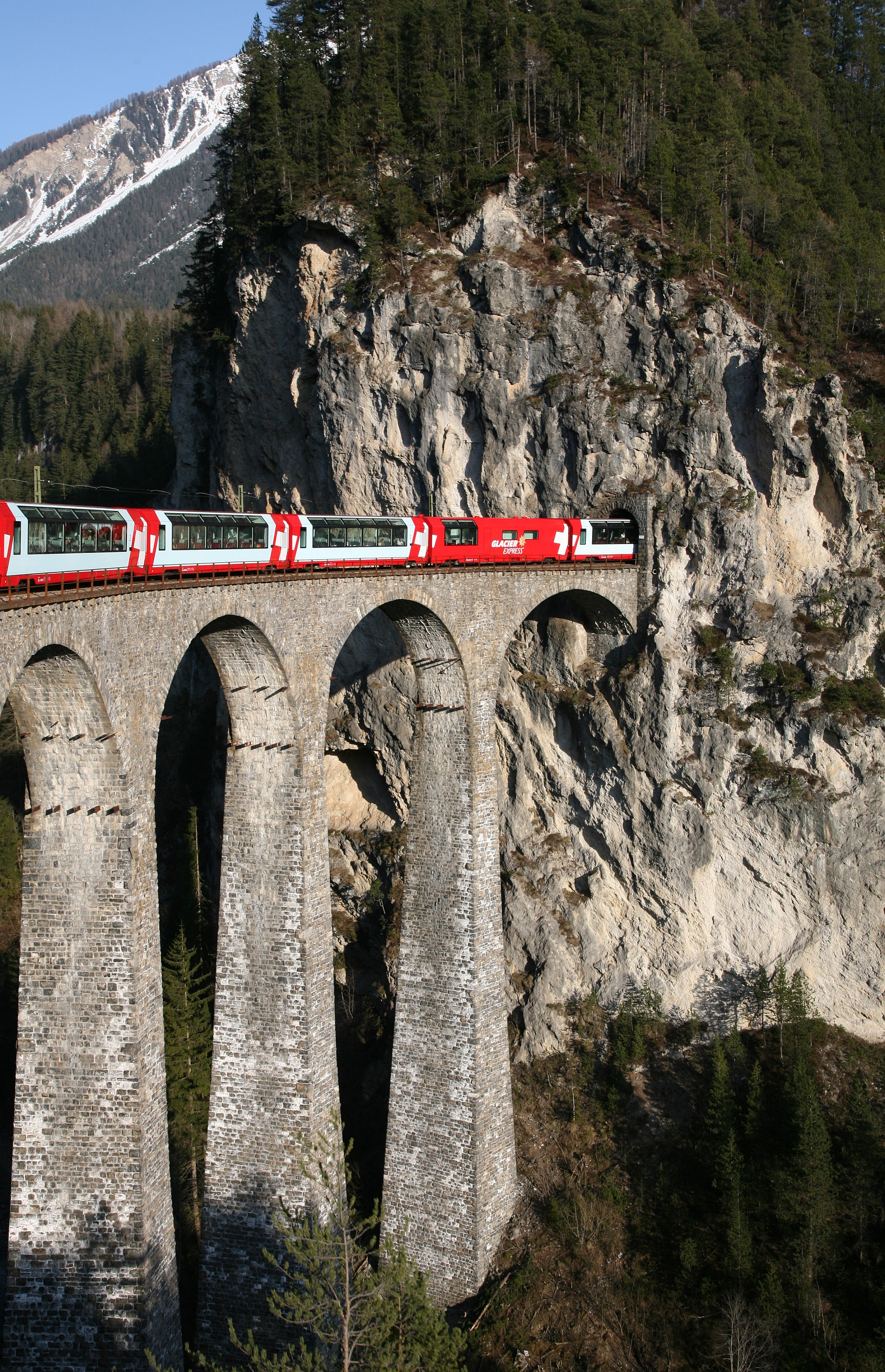
- The Glacier Express traversing the Landwasser Viaduct just before arriving in Filisur.

Overview
- Service type: Tourist train
- Status: Operating daily except for maintenance period in late autumn
- Locale: Graubünden, Uri and Valais, Switzerland
- Predecessor: 2003-2017: RhB and MGB; 1962-2002: RhB, FO, and BVZ; 1925-1962: RhB, FO, and VZ
- First service: 25 June 1930 07:30
- Current operators: Glacier Express AG, which is headquartered in Andermatt
- Ridership: 187,000 (2016)

Route
- Termini: Brig, Zermatt; St. Moritz / Davos (change in Filisur), Chur
- Stops: Fiesch, Andermatt, Disentis/Mustér, Chur, Thusis, Tiefencastel, Filisur, Bergün/Bravuogn, Samedan, Celerina
- Distance travelled: 291 kilometres (181 mi)
- Average journey time: 7 h 55 min (St. Moritz-Davos); 4 h 20 min (Chur-Brig)
- Service frequency: December–April (both directions): One daily Zermatt–St. Moritz; April–May (both directions): Two daily Zermatt–St. Moritz; June–October (both directions): One daily Zermatt–Chur; One daily Brig–St. Moritz; Two daily Zermatt–St. Moritz

On-board services
- Classes: 1st and 2nd
- Disabled access: Yes
- Catering facilities: Restaurant car
- Observation facilities: Panorama cars

Technical
- Rolling stock: Panorama cars Restaurant car
- Track gauge: 1,000 mm (3 ft 3 3/8 in) metre gauge
- Electrification: 11 kV AC 16 2/3 Hz
- Track owners: RhB, MGB

The Glacier Express is a named train in Switzerland, running as a Panorama Express (PE), which directly connects railway stations of the two major mountain resorts of Zermatt and St. Moritz via Andermatt in the central Swiss Alps. The train provides a one-seat ride for an 8-hour end-to-end 291-kilometre (181 mi) journey, and omits stops made by local trains. The Glacier Express has been called the 'slowest express train in the world'. As St. Moritz and Zermatt are home to two well-known mountains, the Glacier Express is also said to travel from Matterhorn to Piz Bernina.

The journey from Zermatt starts at the dead end of an Alpine valley, the Mattertal, just below the Matterhorn at an elevation of 1,606 m (5,269 ft) before it descends to the huge valley of the Valais in Brig. It journeys 291 kilometres (181 mi) through the center of the Swiss Alps, over 291 bridges, through 91 tunnels — such as the 15.4 km-long (9.6 mi) Furka Tunnel at an elevation of 1,500 m (4,900 ft), which circumvents the Furka Pass — makes an intermediate stop at Andermatt in a secluded high Alpine valley, and traverses its high point on the Oberalp Pass at 2,033 m (6,670 ft) before descending to its low point at Chur at 585 m (1,919 ft). From Chur, the capital of the canton of Graubünden, the Glacier Express regains altitude, stopping at Filisur — where travelers can change for a connecting train to reach Davos to the east — and then traverses the Albula Range via a tunnel at 1,800 metres (5,900 ft) to reach the resort St. Moritz in a valley to the south.

Since 2017, the train has been operated by the Glacier Express AG, a cooperation jointly owned by the former operators Matterhorn Gotthard Bahn (MGB) and Rhaetian Railway (RhB). For much of its journey, it also passes along and through the World Heritage Site known as the "Rhaetian Railway in the Albula / Bernina Landscapes".

The first Glacier Express started on 30 June 1930 at 07:30 in Zermatt. Initially, it was operated by three railway companies: the Visp-Zermatt-Bahn (VZ), the Furka Oberalp Bahn (FO), and the Rhätische Bahn (RhB). From 2003 to 2017, the train was operated by Rhätische Bahn (RhB) and the Matterhorn Gotthard Bahn (MGB), which arose from a merger between the BVZ and the FO.

The entire line is metre gauge (narrow gauge), with 23.9 kilometres (14.9 mi) using the rack-and-pinion system both for ascending steep grades and to control descent.

The entire journey can also be made on comfortable regular passenger trains operated by RhB (IR38, RE7) and MGB (R45, R43, R41/42) which do not require seat reservations, taking just over eight hours and changing trains at Reichenau-Tamins, Disentis/Mustér, Andermatt and Brig stations.

== History ==
=== Early years ===
The completion of the final portion of the FO in 1926 opened up the cantons of Valais and Graubünden to further tourist development. In particular, a pathway was laid for the introduction of Kurswagen (through coaches) between Brig and Chur, and between Brig and St. Moritz.

In early June 1930, the then Visp–Zermatt Bahn was extended to Brig by the opening of a metre gauge line along the Rhone Valley between Visp and Brig. For the first time, it was feasible to operate through coaches all the way from Zermatt to St. Moritz and return. On 25 June 1930, the first train of such coaches set out from Zermatt to St. Moritz, under the name Glacier Express. The new train's name honoured the Rhone Glacier, which is near Gletsch, on the Furka Pass.

Until 1982, the Glacier Express operated only in the summer months, because the Furka Pass and the Oberalp Pass were both snowed over in winter. Initially, the train was made up of first to third class salon and passenger coaches, supplied by all three of the participating railway companies. Between Chur and Disentis/Mustér, passengers could enjoy a hot lunch in a Mitropa dining car. From 1933, the Glacier Express through coaches were attached to normal passenger trains between Brig and Zermatt.

In the earliest years of the Glacier Express, electric locomotives were used to haul the Glacier Express on the BVZ and the RhB, but steam locomotives were used on the FO. That changed in 1941–1942, when overhead catenary was installed on the FO, enabling completely electric operation for the full length of the route. However, no through trains were operated between 1943 and 1946, due to World War II.

Upon the resumption of daily through trains in 1948, the dining car service was extended from Disentis/Mustér to the top of the Oberalp Pass. Between the 1950s and the 1970s, both the BVZ and the RhB introduced new locomotive classes that, when attached to the Glacier Express, enabled reductions in schedule times. Meanwhile, the dining car service was extended further, to Andermatt.

=== Year-round operations ===
In 1981, a Glacier Express era came to an end with the final closure for the winter of the FO line over the Furka Pass and through the Furka Summit Tunnel, between Oberwald, Gletsch and Realp. In June 1982, that FO line was replaced by the newly opened Furka Base Tunnel. As a consequence, the Glacier Express not only became disconnected from its namesake Rhone Glacier, but also could now, for the first time, be operated on a year-round basis.

At that time, the BVZ, FO and RhB took the opportunity to relaunch the Glacier Express as a tourist attraction. Promotional material focused on the train's status as "the slowest express train in the world", covering 291 km (181 mi), 91 tunnels, and over 291 bridges. A special promotional wine glass on a sloping base emphasised the steepness of some parts of the route. Passenger numbers rose from 20,000 in 1982 to over 53,000 in 1983, and to just over 80,000 in 1984.

=== Recent developments ===
In 1985, the Glacier Express timetable was completely revised. Between 1986 and 1993, the BVZ and the FO invested nearly 40 million Swiss francs in constructing 18 new first class panorama cars for the train. By 2005, more than 250,000 passengers were travelling on the Glacier Express each year.

In 2006, a few scenes of the documentary film The Alps were shot inside the train, and further new panorama cars were added to the Glacier Express passenger car fleet. On 7 July 2008, the Albula Railway and the Bernina Railway were jointly recorded in the list of UNESCO World Heritage Sites, under the name Rhaetian Railway in the Albula / Bernina Landscapes. Currently, the Glacier Express is especially popular with tourists from Germany, Japan, and, increasingly, India.

The rail line provides fresh meals to riders, but does not normally have adequate space for chefs to store raw materials for those meals preparation. The rail line thus contracts local businesses and caterers to guarantee supplies upon the line's arrival in their locality.

In 2013, the direct service to Davos was discontinued because of decreasing passenger numbers and unfavourable economic circumstances.

In 2018, two additional summer services were introduced. Each morning one service departs from Zermatt to Chur, and one service departs from St. Moritz to Brig. These services then travel back in the afternoon.

=== 2010 derailment ===
On 23 July 2010, a Glacier Express train derailed near Fiesch on the Matterhorn Gotthard Bahn line. One passenger was killed and 42 other passengers were injured. The accident was caused by the train traveling too fast as a result of human error.

== Itinerary ==
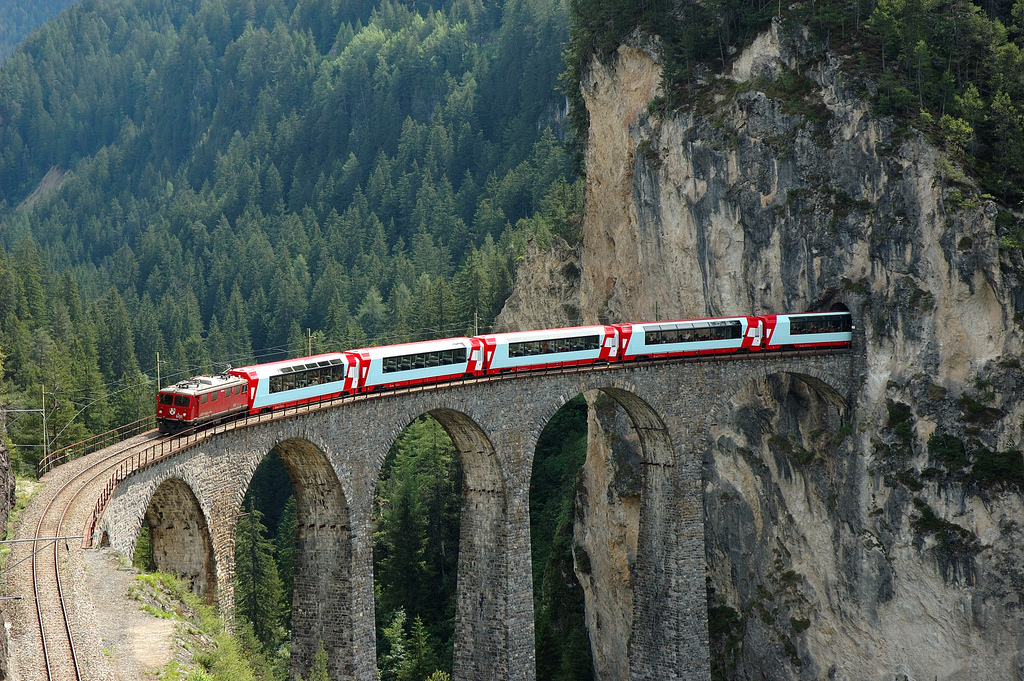
Glacier Express on the Landwasser Viaduct

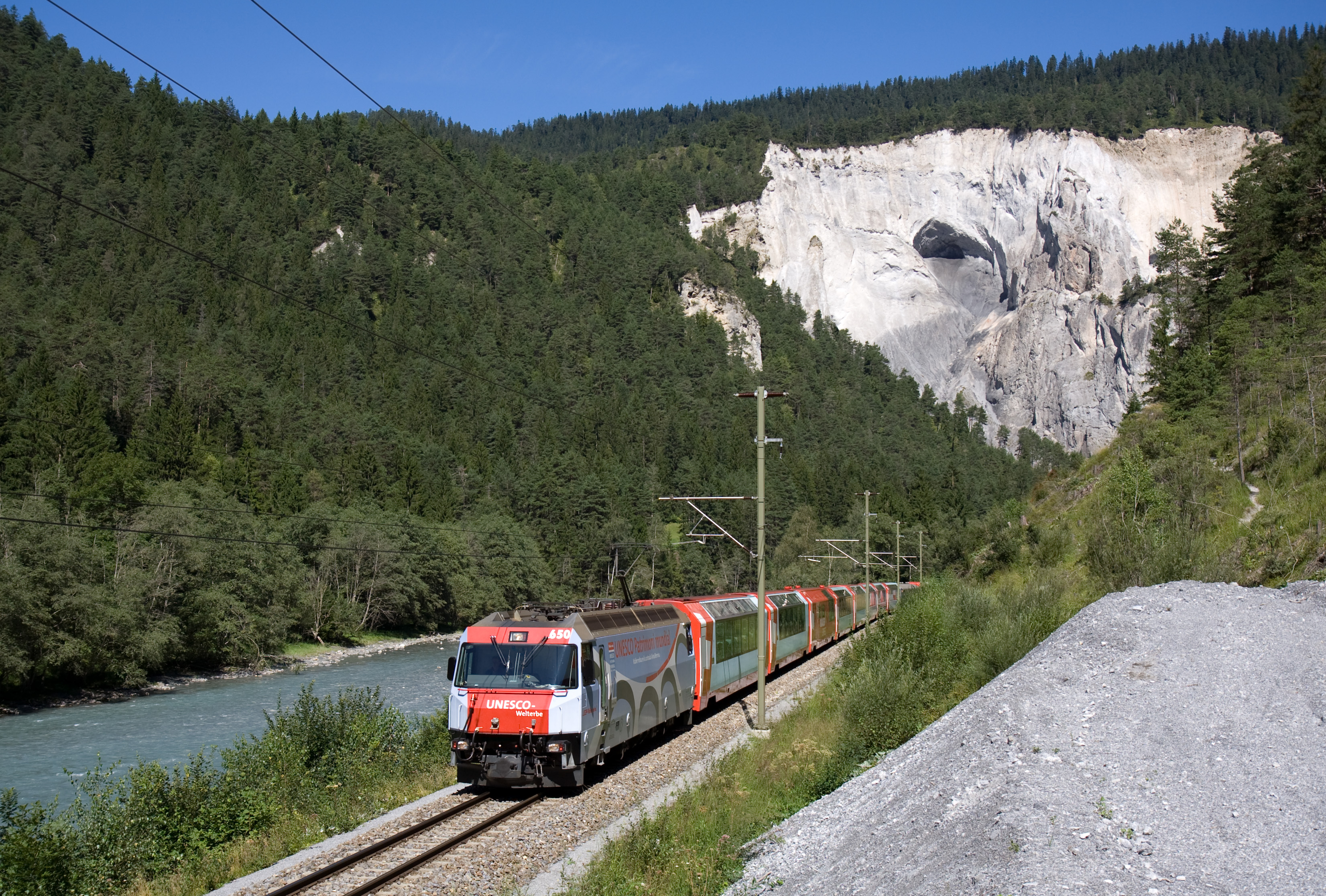
Glacier Express in the Rhine Gorge

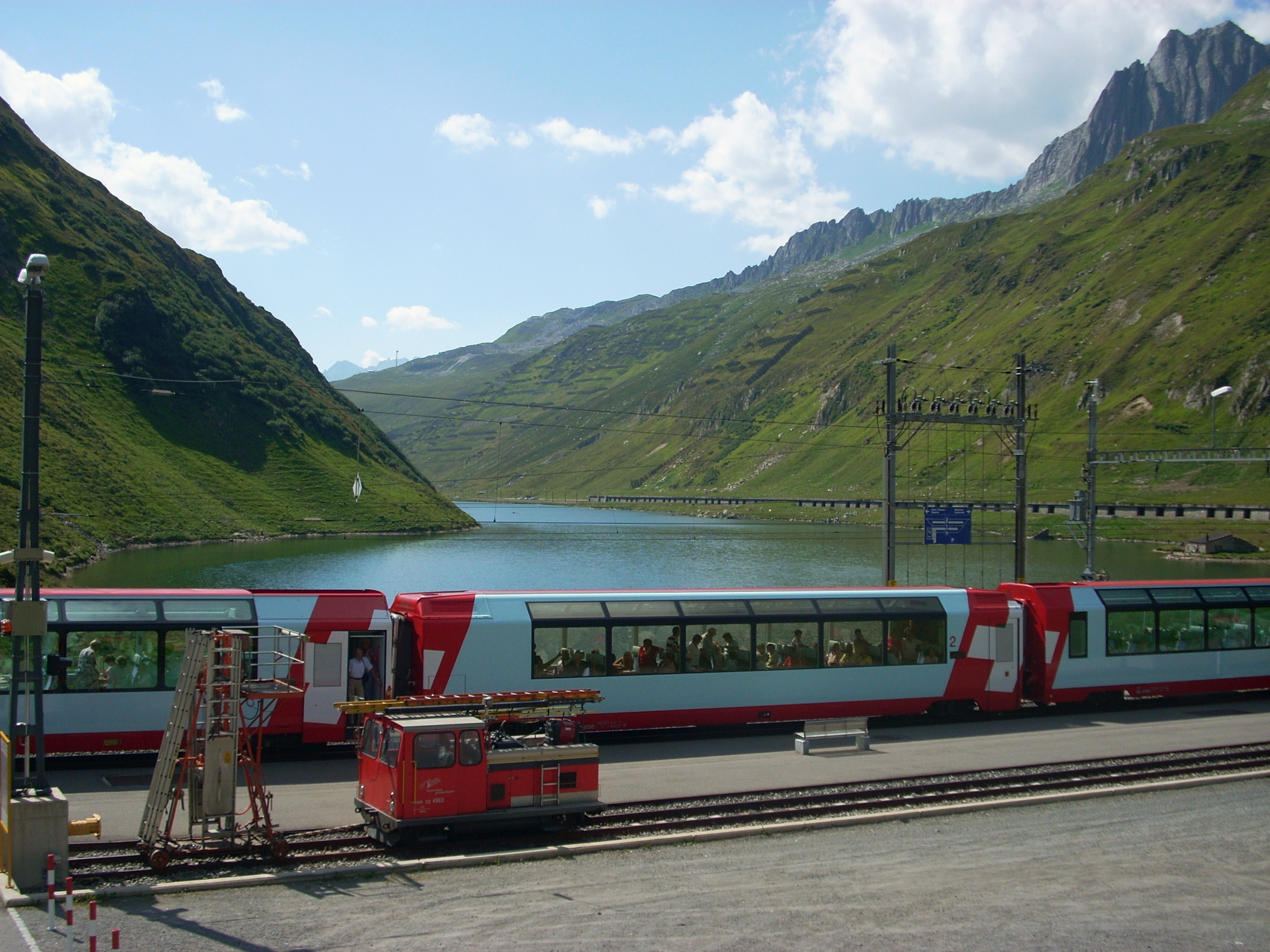
Glacier Express at the Oberalp Pass (highest point)

=== Albula line ===
Shortly after leaving St. Moritz station (1,775 m or 5,823 ft) in Graubünden, the train passes Samedan and Bever on the high Engadin plateau. There it continues in the Val Bever before entering the Albula Tunnel at 1,815 m (5,955 ft) under the Albula Pass. After the tunnel, the train passes through Preda, the first station in the Albula Valley and continues toward Bergün/Bravuogn. Between these two villages, the train has to go through many spirals because of the high difference of altitude within a short distance (400 m [1,300 ft] for 5 km [3.1 mi]).

After another spiral, the train reaches Filisur at the end of the valley at (1,032 m or 3,386 ft). From there, the train passes on the Landwasser Viaduct, the most emblematic landmark of the railway line and continues toward Thusis (720 m or 2,360 ft) where it reaches the Posterior Rhine and follows it to the city of Chur (585 m or 1,919 ft).

=== Oberalp section ===
From Chur, the train follows back the course of the Rhine through the gorge of Ruinaulta and climbs slowly the valley toward Ilanz (698 m or 2,290 ft), Disentis/Mustér (1,142 m or 3,747 ft) and Sedrun (1,404 m or 4,606 ft). From Sedrun the line becomes steeper to finally reach its summit, the Oberalp Pass at 2,033 m (6,670 ft). From there the train enters the Canton of Uri in Central Switzerland and continues down to Andermatt (1,447 m or 4,747 ft).

=== Furka section ===
From Andermatt, the train goes forward in the valley called Urseren passing the villages of Hospental (1,452 m or 4,764 ft) and Realp (1,538 m or 5,046 ft). From there the train enters the Furka Base Tunnel, leaving the old railway line which climbs the Furka Pass (operated today by the Furka Cogwheel Steam Railway), to emerge in Oberwald (1,368 m or 4,488 ft) in the Goms Valley, in the Canton of Valais. The train then continues toward Brig, following the course of the Rhone, and passes along the villages of Ulrichen (1,346 m or 4,416 ft), Münster-Geschinen (1,359 m or 4,459 ft) and Fiesch (1,049 m or 3,442 ft), before going through another spiral.

=== Mattertal line ===
The Glacier Express's route through Switzerland

From Brig, (678 m or 2,224 ft) the train continues to Visp (651 m or 2,136 ft), then enters the valley of Mattertal and goes up, passing the villages of Stalden (799 m or 2,621 ft), St. Niklaus (1,127 m or 3,698 ft) and Randa (1,408 m or 4,619 ft), where a spectacular debris avalanche completely disconnected the railway and road in 1991. Täsch (1,450 m or 4,760 ft) is an important station as it is the end of the open road, and therefore a terminal for motorists. After a steeper section the train finally arrives in Zermatt at 1,616 m (5,302 ft), after nearly 8 hours of travel.

== See also ==
- Albula Railway
- Bernina Express
- Brig-Visp-Zermatt-Bahn
- GoldenPass Express
- Gotthard Panorama Express
- Furka Oberalp Bahn
- Furka Cogwheel Steam Railway
- List of narrow-gauge railways in Switzerland
- Rail transport in Switzerland
- Swiss Alps
- Tourism in Switzerland
