= Fiesch railway station =

Railway station in Fiesch, Switzerland

Fiesch
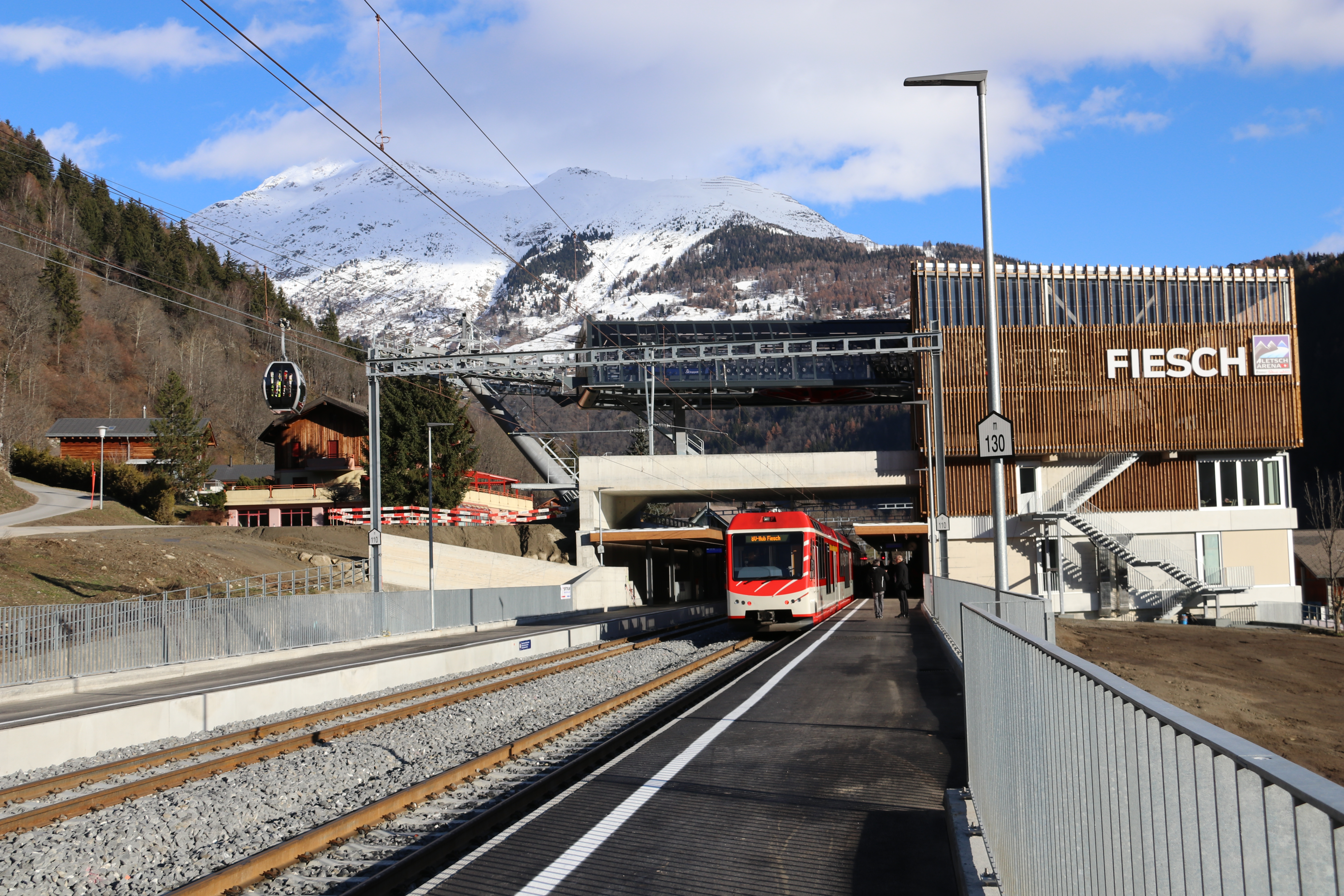
- The new railway station

General information
- Location: Bahnhofstrasse; Fiesch; Switzerland
- Coordinates: 46°24′11″N 8°07′58″E
- Elevation: 1,062 m (3,484 ft)
- Owner: Matterhorn Gotthard Bahn
- Line: Furka Oberalp line
- Distance: 17.6 kilometres (10.9 mi) from Brig Bahnhofplatz
- Platforms: 2 side platforms
- Tracks: 2
- Train operators: Matterhorn Gotthard Bahn
- Connections: PostAuto AG buses

Construction
- Accessible: Yes

Other information
- Station code: 8501672 (FIE)

History
- Opened: 1 July 1914

Passengers
- 2023: 1'500 per weekday (MGB)

Services
| Preceding station | Matterhorn Gotthard Bahn | Following station |
|---|---|---|
| Fiesch Feriendorf towards Visp | R 43 | Fürgangen-Bellwald Talstation towards Andermatt |
| Fiesch Feriendorf towards Zermatt | RE 42 | Terminus |
Location

Fiesch railway station is a metre gauge station serving the municipality of Fiesch, in the Canton of Valais, Switzerland. The station forms part of the Furka Oberalp Bahn (FO), which connects Brig in Valais, via Furka Base Tunnel, Andermatt in Uri, with Göschenen, Uri, and Disentis/Mustér, Graubünden. Since 1 January 2003, the FO has been owned and operated by the Matterhorn Gotthard Bahn (MGB), following a merger between the FO and the Brig-Visp-Zermatt railway (BVZ).

The railway station was moved in 2019 and completely renewed. It now includes the lower end of the Fiesch - Fiescheralp gondola, further connected to the Eggishorn.

== Services ==
As of the December 2023 timetable change, the following services stop at Fiesch:

- Regio: hourly service between Visp and Andermatt.
- RegioExpress: hourly service to Zermatt.

The long-distance Glacier Express passes through Fiesch without stopping; the Glacier Express ceased stopping at Fiesch in late 2018.

== Gallery ==
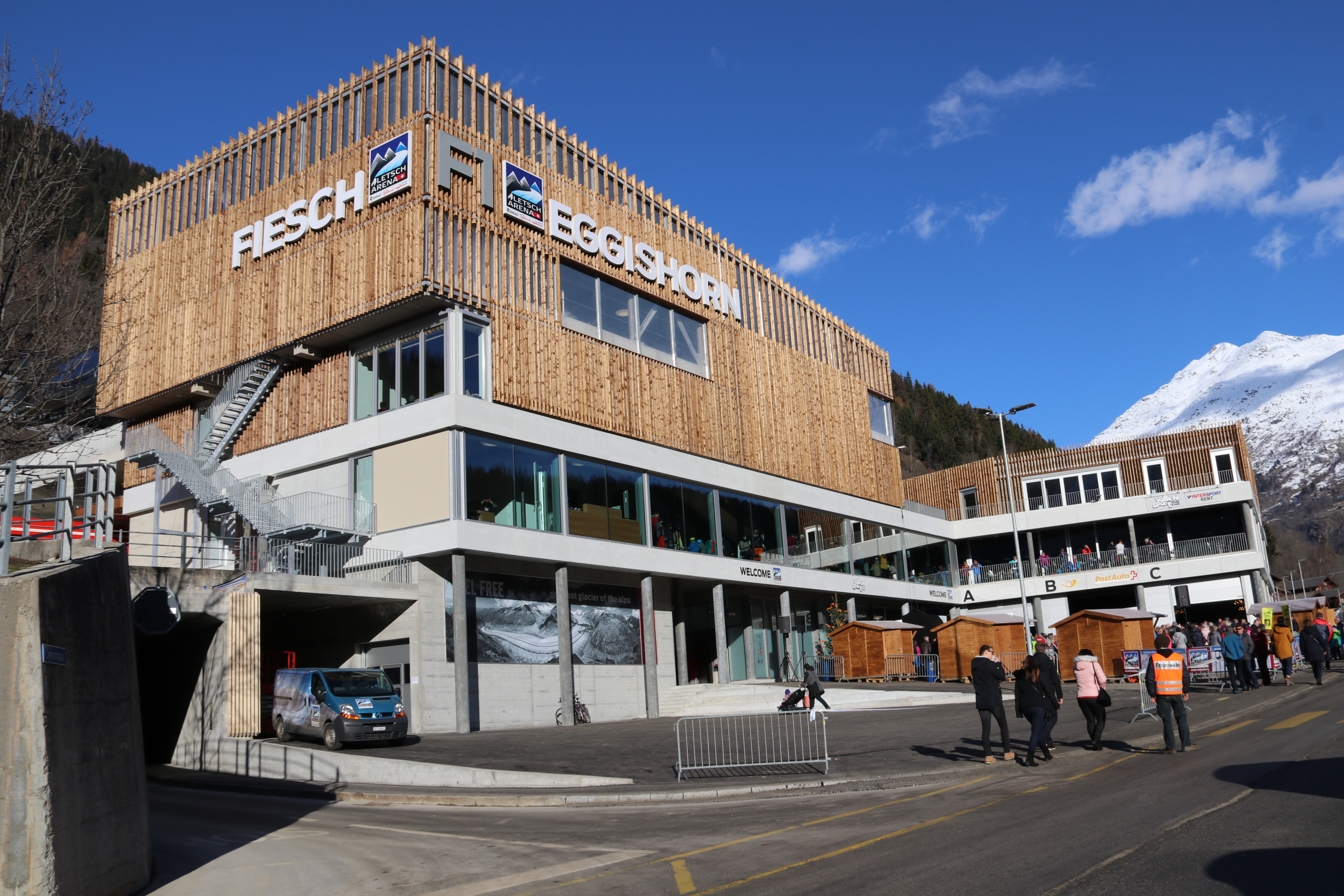
Station building and lower station of the aerial lift (Luftseilbahn Fiesch-Eggishorn), in 2019

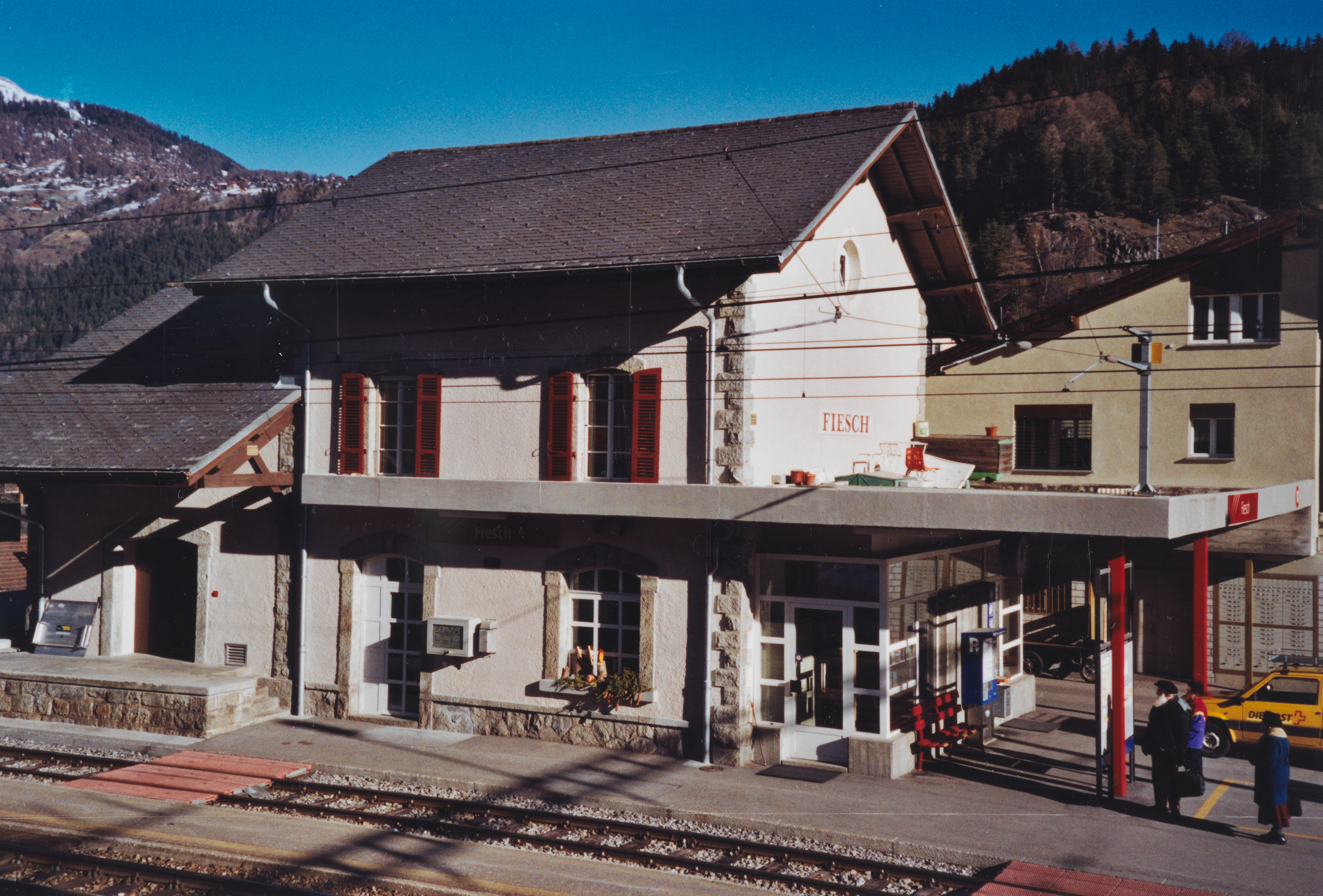
Station building at the pre-2019 location (2003)

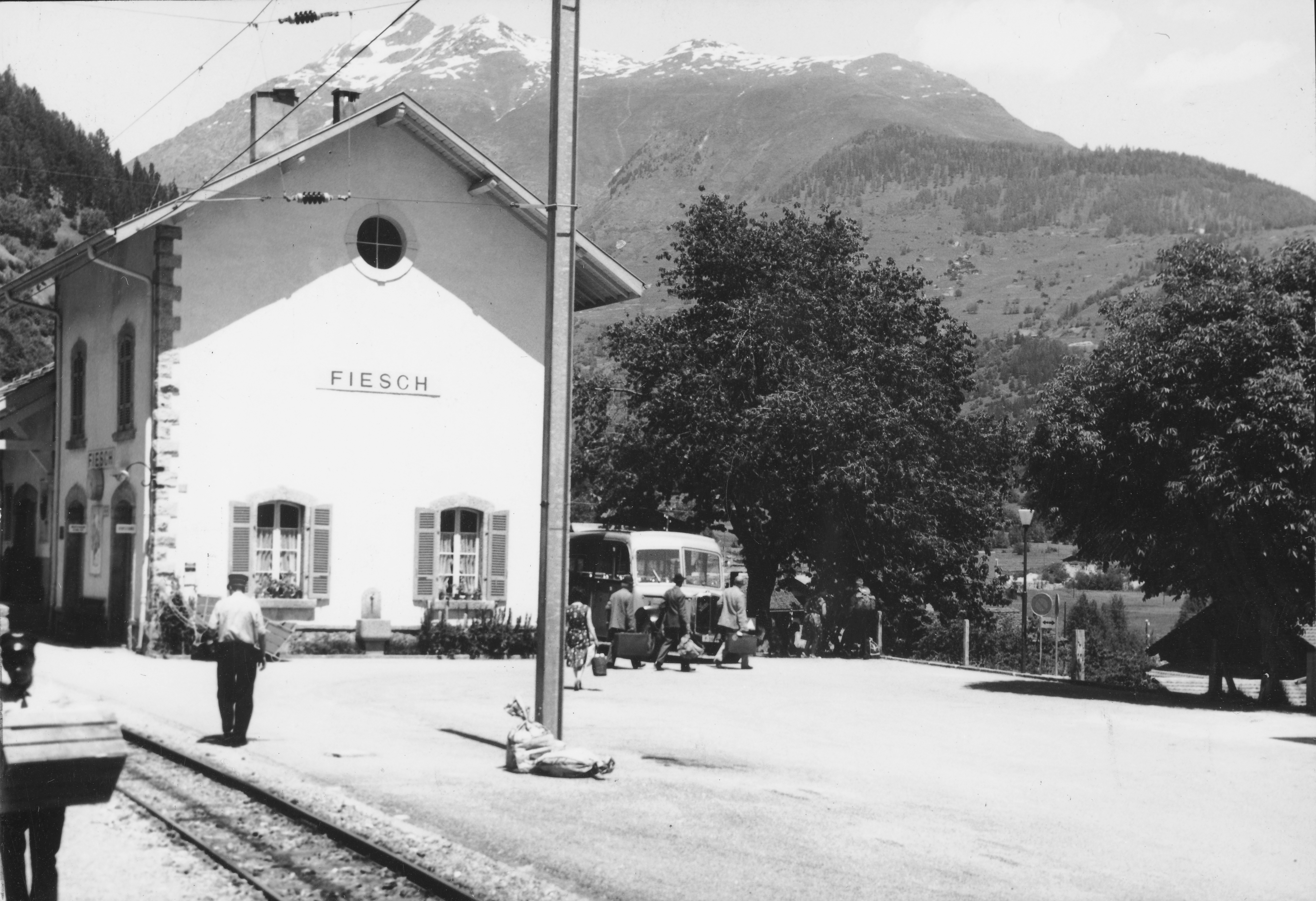
Station building (1962)
