= Zermatt railway station =

Railway station in Zermatt, Switzerland

Zermatt
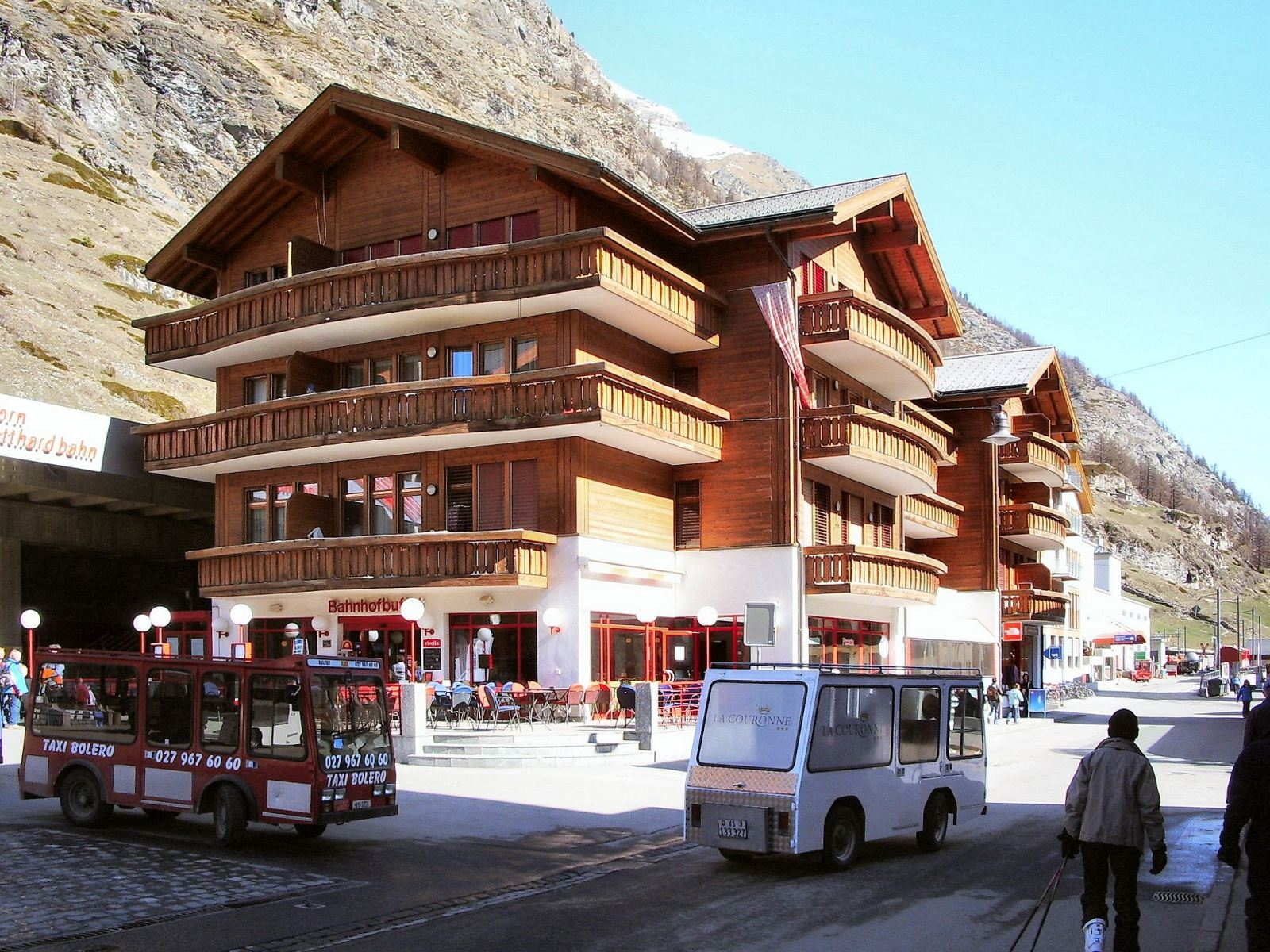
- The station building in 2007

General information
- Location: Bahnhofplatz; Zermatt; Switzerland
- Coordinates: 46°01′N 7°45′E
- Elevation: 1,605 m (5,266 ft)
- Owner: Matterhorn Gotthard Bahn
- Line: Brig–Zermatt line
- Platforms: 6
- Tracks: 6
- Train operators: Matterhorn Gotthard Bahn
- Connections: Local electric buses

Construction
- Accessible: Yes

Other information
- Station code: 8501689 (ZERM)

History
- Opened: 18 July 1891
- Electrified: 1 October 1929

Passengers
- 2025: 11,900 per day (MGB)
- Rank: 68 out of 1,095

Services
Preceding station	Glacier Express	Following station
Terminus	Glacier Express	Brig Bahnhofplatz towards St. Moritz
Preceding station	Matterhorn Gotthard Bahn	Following station
Terminus	RE 41	Täsch towards Visp
Terminus	RE 42	Täsch towards Fiesch
Terminus	R 40	Täsch Terminus
Location

Zermatt railway station is a metre gauge railway station serving the car-free mountaineering and ski resort of Zermatt, in the Canton of Valais, Switzerland. It is the southern terminus of the BVZ Zermatt-Bahn (BVZ), which connects Zermatt with standard gauge lines at Visp (served by SBB-CFF-FFS) and Brig (served by SBB-CFF-FFS and BLS AG). Since 1 January 2003, the BVZ has been owned and operated by the Matterhorn Gotthard Bahn (MGB), following a merger between the BVZ and the Furka Oberalp Bahn (FO). The station is across the street from Zermatt GGB railway station, the valley terminus of the Gornergrat Railway.

== Overview ==
Every day, several Glacier Express trains, which are operated at this point by the MGB, either originate from, or terminate at, Zermatt station. The MGB also operates regional services to Brig at half-hourly intervals.

Additionally, due to Zermatt's car-free status, the MGB has a frequent special shuttle train service between Zermatt and nearby Täsch, where people travelling to and from Zermatt by combustion-engined vehicles are required to park. For the better part of most days, this service operates at 20-minute intervals; it takes 12 minutes.

== Services ==
As of the December 2023 timetable change, the following services stop at Zermatt:

- Glacier Express: one or more trains per day, depending on the season, to St. Moritz or Chur.
- RegioExpress: half-hourly service to Visp, with every other train continuing to Fiesch.
- Regio: shuttle service every twenty minutes to Täsch.

== Gallery ==
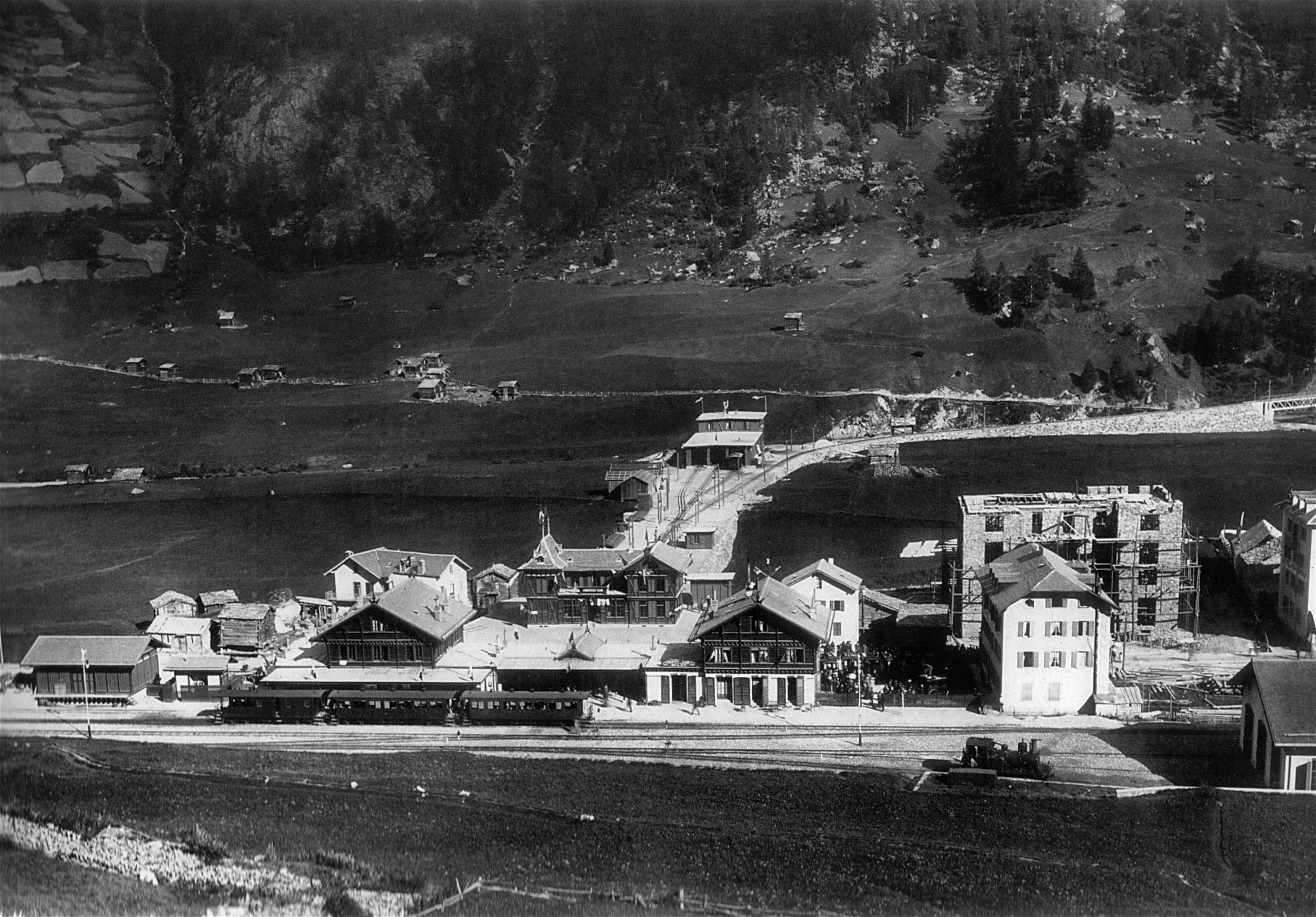
Zermatt railway station, ca 1900.

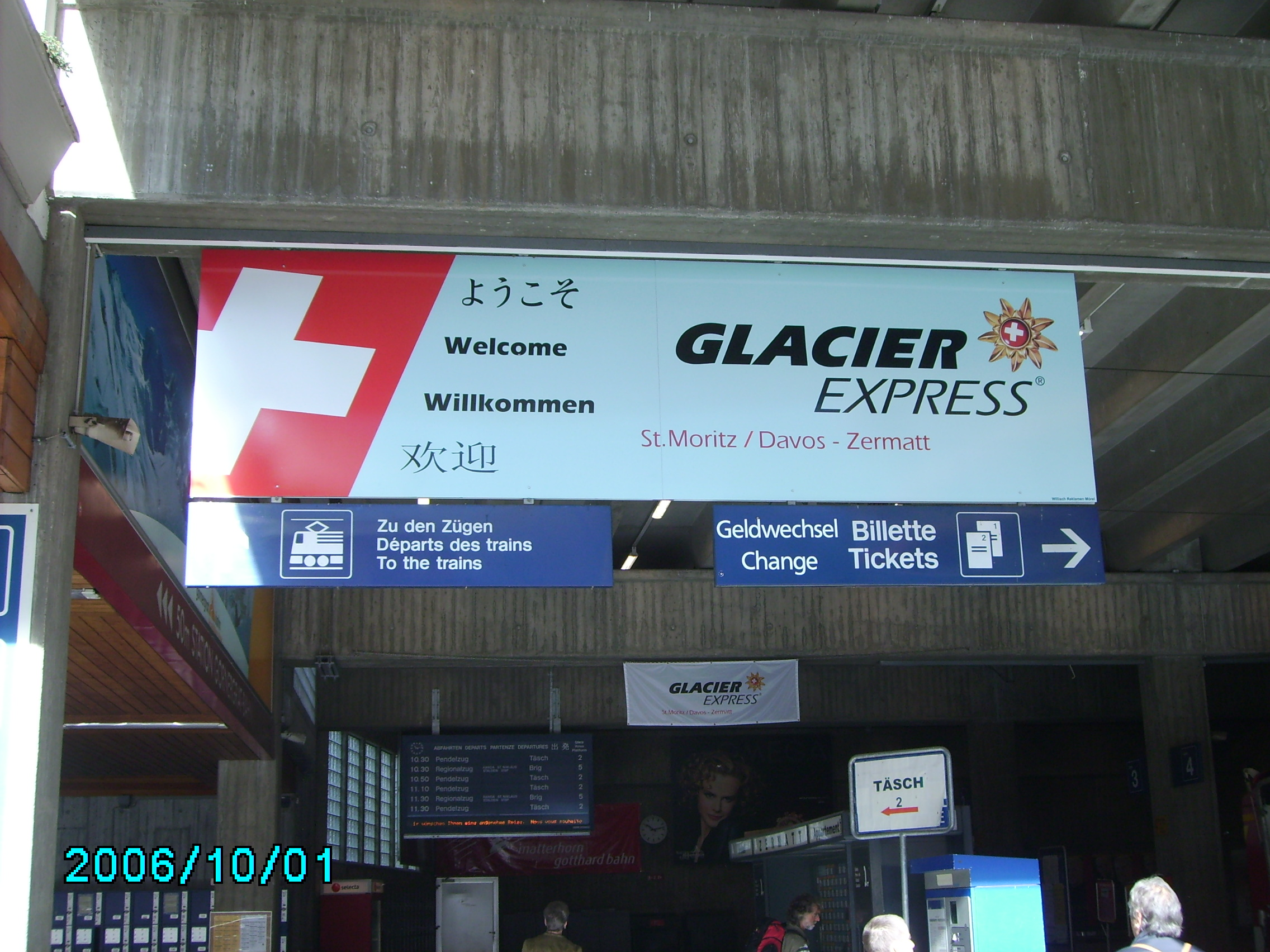
Glacier Express welcome sign.

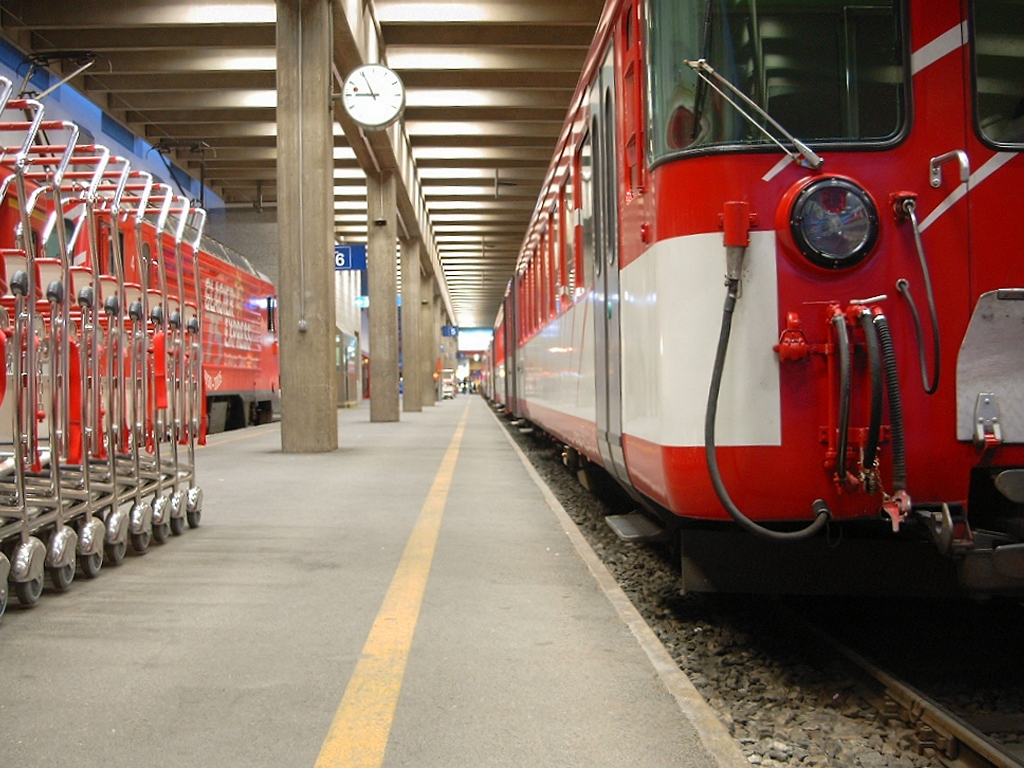
The station concourse.

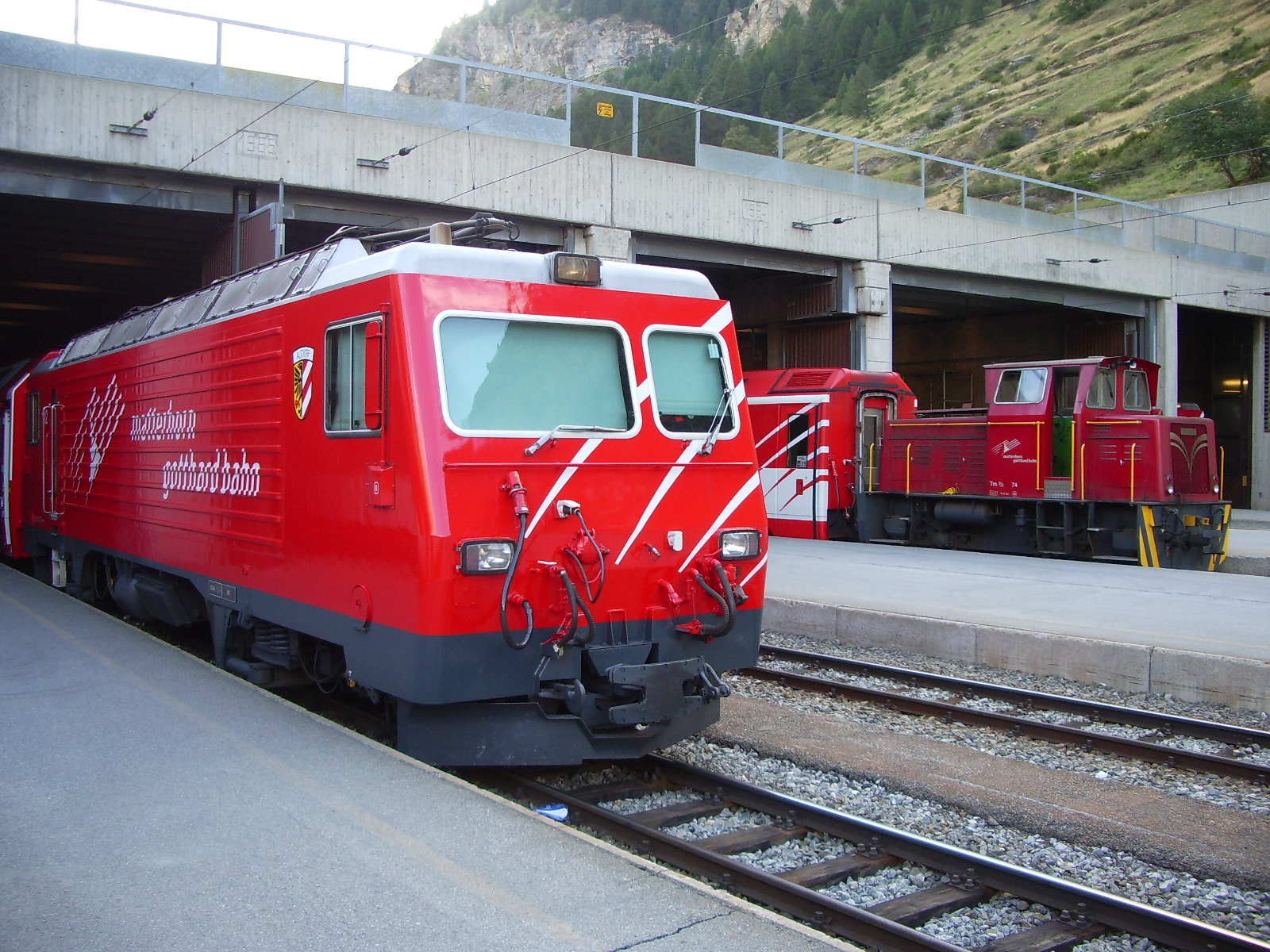
HGe 4/4 II No. 102 and Tm 74.

== See also ==
- Rail transport in Switzerland
- Glacier Express
- Matterhorn Gotthard Bahn
- BVZ Zermatt-Bahn
- Riffelalptram
- Zermatt
- Matterhorn
