= Visp railway station =

Railway station in Visp, Switzerland

Visp
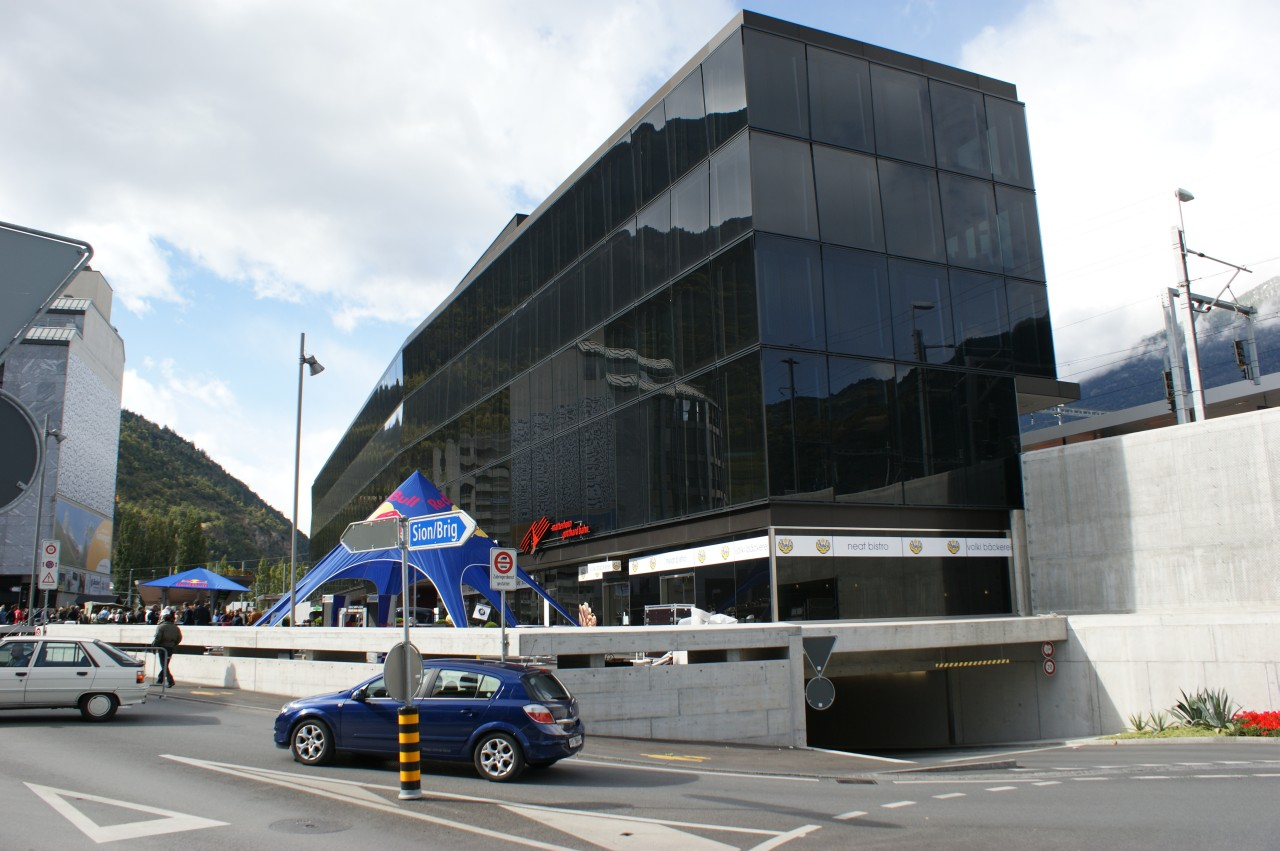
- The new station building from the street.

General information
- Location: Bahnhofplatz 2 Visp; Switzerland
- Coordinates: 46°17′39″N 7°52′53″E
- Elevation: 650 m (2,130 ft)
- Owner: Swiss Federal Railways
- Lines: Brig–Zermatt railway line; Lausanne–Brig; Spiez–Lötschberg Base Tunnel–Brig
- Distance: 8.9 km (5.5 mi) from Brig Bahnhofplatz; 136.7 km (84.9 mi) from Lausanne
- Platforms: 7: 3 island platforms; 1 side platform
- Tracks: 6 (standard gauge); 3 (metre gauge)
- Train operators: Matterhorn Gotthard Bahn; RegionAlps; Swiss Federal Railways
- Connections: PostAuto AG buses; RegionAlps bus lines

Construction
- Parking: Yes (162 spaces)
- Cycle facilities: Yes (277 spaces)
- Accessible: Yes

Other information
- Station code: 8501605 (VI)
- IATA code: ZLB

History
- Electrified: 1 October 1929 (BVZ)

Passengers
- 2025: 26,600 per day (BLS, MGB, RegionAlps, SBB)
- Rank: 27 out of 1,095

Services
Preceding station	SBB CFF FFS	Following station
Spiez towards Basel SBB	EuroCity	Brig towards Milano Centrale
Spiez towards Basel SBB	IC 6	Brig Terminus
Spiez towards Romanshorn	IC 8	Brig Terminus
Sierre/Siders towards Geneva Airport	IR 90	Brig Terminus
Leuk towards Geneva Airport	IR 95	Brig Terminus
Preceding station	DB Fernverkehr	Following station
Spiez towards Berlin Ostbahnhof	ICE 12	Brig Terminus
Preceding station	Matterhorn Gotthard Bahn	Following station
Terminus	R 43	Eyholz towards Andermatt
Stalden-Saas towards Zermatt	RE 42	Eyholz towards Fiesch
Stalden-Saas towards Zermatt	RE 41	Terminus
Preceding station	RegionAlps	Following station
Raron towards St-Gingolph	R91	Brig Terminus
Raron towards Monthey	R91	Brig Terminus
Preceding station	BLS	Following station
Terminus	RE2	Brig One-way operation
Location

Visp railway station is a junction station at Visp (French: Viège), in the canton of Valais, Switzerland. It has a modern station building completed in 2007, and is served by two standard gauge lines and a metre gauge line.

Visp station is the busiest railway station in Valais.

Every day, about 230 trains stop at Visp, and approximately 25,300 passengers use the station.

== Rail services ==
=== Standard gauge ===
The older of the two standard gauge lines serving Visp is the Simplon Railway, which links (Geneva Airport, Geneva and) Lausanne on Lake Geneva with Brig, at the northern portal of the Simplon Tunnel, via Sion.

In 2007, Visp became a standard gauge junction station, upon the opening of the New Railway Link through the Alps (NRLA), connecting (Bern and) Spiez with Brig and the Simplon Tunnel, via the Lötschberg Base Tunnel.

All of the standard gauge passenger trains stopping at Visp are operated by SBB CFF FFS, even though the Lötschberg Base Tunnel is owned by another railway company, BLS AG.

=== Metre gauge ===
Visp is also served by the metre gauge Brig-Visp-Zermatt railway (BVZ). Since 1 January 2003, the BVZ has been owned and operated by the Matterhorn Gotthard Bahn (MGB), following a merger between the BVZ and the Furka Oberalp Bahn (FO).

The MGB also operates metre gauge half-hourly service from Zermatt to Visp, and from Visp to Brig and beyond, at hourly intervals.

== The Lötschberg Base Tunnel renovations ==
Following an architecture competition, a new station building was constructed at Visp to coincide with the opening of the Lötschberg Base Tunnel. The new station building is four storeys high, and features blue mirror glass cladding. In 2007, Visp station won the inaugural FLUX Prize, which is awarded to particularly well designed Swiss transport hubs.

Upon the opening of the Lötschberg Base Tunnel, Visp station became a major exchange station for surrounding towns such as Sion, and Martigny and wintersport areas like Saas Fee, Saas Grund und Zermatt, partly because the Base Tunnel emerges shortly before Visp, and bypasses the larger towns.

In the aftermath of the station's reconstruction, the population of Visp grew significantly. Whereas the town had had 6,100 residents in 2006, the population grew by 2008 to 7,100 inhabitants. That is an increase of nearly 10% in only two years. The reason for the increase is the new residential area of Visp-West, which is also a consequence of the station's rebuilding. In only three years, Visp-West should accommodate a further 3,000 residents.

Since the rebuild, there has also been a change in international traffic flows, with trains between Basel and Milan now passing through Visp and Brig via the Lötschberg Base Tunnel, instead of bypassing the town via the Lötschberg railway line (including the old Lötschberg Tunnel) and Brig.

Mountains reflected in the station building

== See also ==
- SBB CFF FFS
- Lötschberg Base Tunnel
- Matterhorn Gotthard Bahn
- Brig–Visp–Zermatt railway
