= Matterhorn Gotthard Bahn =

Swiss railway company

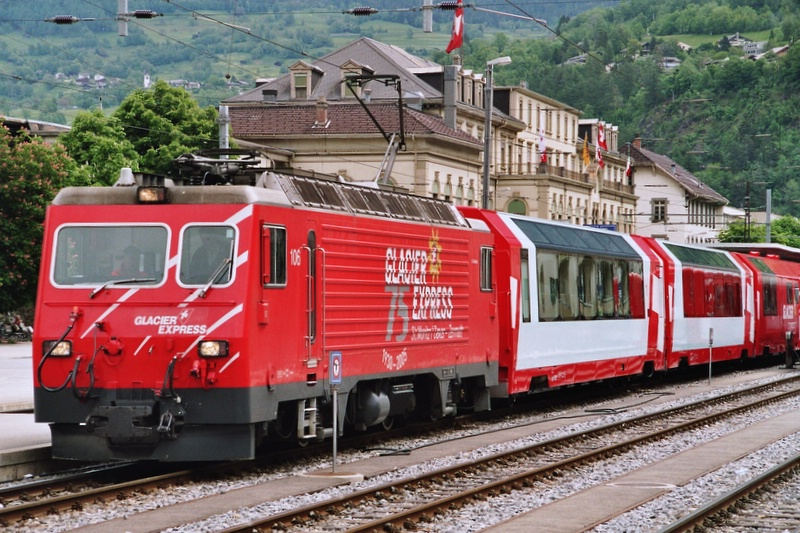
- Glacier Express at Brig-Glis

Overview
- Status: running daily the whole year
- Owner: Matterhorn Gotthard Bahn AG (MGB)
- Locale: Zermatt, Brig, Andermatt, Göschenen, Disentis/Mustér
- Stations: 44
- Website: http://www.matterhorngotthardbahn.ch/

Service
- Type: commuter, tourists, freight
- System: MGB, national railway network
- Services: 2
- Operator(s): MGB

Technical
- Line length: 144 km (89.5 mi)
- Number of tracks: Single track with passing loops
- Rack system: Abt assisted
- Track gauge: 1,000 mm (3 ft 3 3/8 in) metre gauge
- Electrification: 11 kV 16.7 Hz
- Highest elevation: 1,564 m (5,131 ft)

The Matterhorn Gotthard Bahn is a narrow gauge railway line and a railway company (Matterhorn Gotthard Bahn AG, MGB) in Switzerland. The track width is 1,000 mm (3 ft 3 3/8 in). It was created in 2003 through an amalgamation of Furka Oberalp Bahn (FO) and BVZ Zermatt-Bahn (BVZ). The name comes from the Matterhorn and St. Gotthard Pass.

Its network is 144 km (89.5 mi) long and stretches from Disentis in the canton of Graubünden to Zermatt in the canton of Wallis, by way of the Oberalp Pass and Andermatt in the canton of Uri, the Furka Base Tunnel, Brig, and Visp. From Andermatt, a branch line (the formerly independent Schöllenenbahn) extends to Göschenen, at the northern end of the Gotthard Rail Tunnel.

The network is an adhesion railway but using Abt rack assistance on the steeper inclines.

Between Realp and Oberwald the line formerly crossed the Furka Pass, at a crest elevation of 2,162 m (7,093 ft) above sea level with a 1.87 km (1.16 mi) tunnel passing beneath the pass. This compares to a crest elevation of just 1,564 m (5,131 ft) above sea level in today's Furka Base Tunnel, which is 15.34 km (9.53 mi) long. The old line, the scenic route, which is very attractive to tourists, is operated by the Dampfbahn Furka-Bergstrecke (DFB) ("Furka Heritage Railway") using veteran steam engines.

There is a connection to the Rhaetian Railway in Disentis and the Glacier Express runs from Zermatt to St. Moritz, using stock from both companies.

== Operation ==
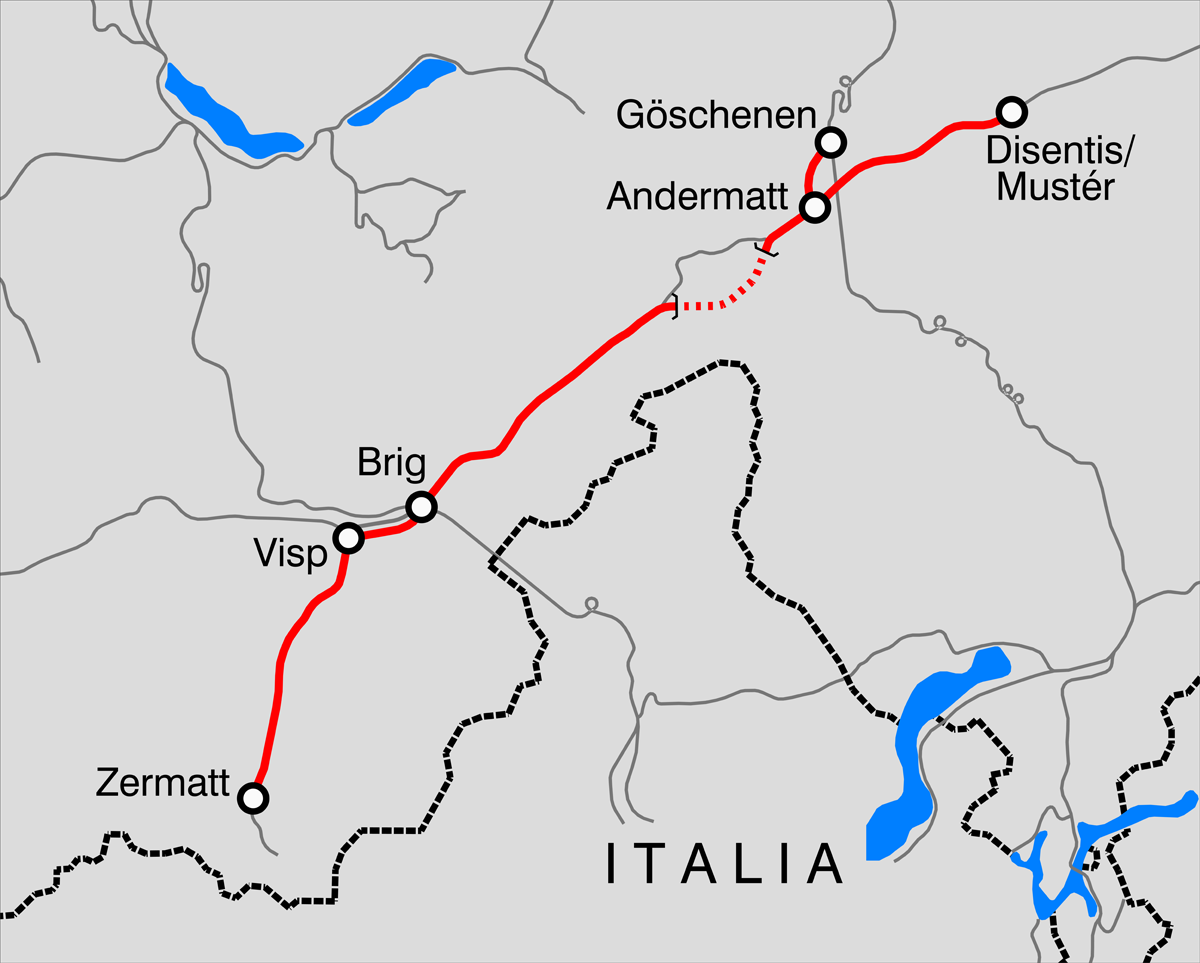
MGB route map.

Apart from the Glacier Express, the current schedule sees passenger trains commuting between Brig and Zermatt, Brig and Göschenen, as well as Andermatt and Disentis. MGB also operates two car shuttle trains: between Realp and Oberwald through Furka Base Tunnel, and between Andermatt and Sedrun.

Large-scale freight traffic only takes place between Visp and Zermatt and between Disentis and the NRLA construction site near Sedrun.

== Accidents and incidents ==
- 11 September 2017, the locomotive of a train collided with its own coaches during a manoeuvre at Andermatt station. About 30 people were injured.
- 3 July 2020, a shuttle train hit the side of the passenger train, which was carrying 30 passengers. A few minor injuries were reported. The wreck occurred in the small town of Oberwald in south Switzerland, near the Italian border. The Matterhorn Gotthard Bahn train line, which passes through the Alps, was halted on account of the crash.

== Corporate structure ==
The MGB is composed of three companies: the Matterhorn Gotthard AG (MGB) emerged from a rebranding of BVZ, the Matterhorn Gotthard infrastructure AG (MGI) is the former FO, and a new stock company Matterhorn Gotthard railway (MGM) has been established as a management umbrella. The MGB has taken over FO's operations and has turned over BVZ's infrastructure to MGI in exchange. The MGB is majority owned by the BVZ Holding AG (which also owns the Gornergratbahn AG (GGB)), whereas the MGI shares are held by the Swiss federal government and the cantons, MGM is owned by BVZ Holding and the public sector in equal shares.

== Pictures ==
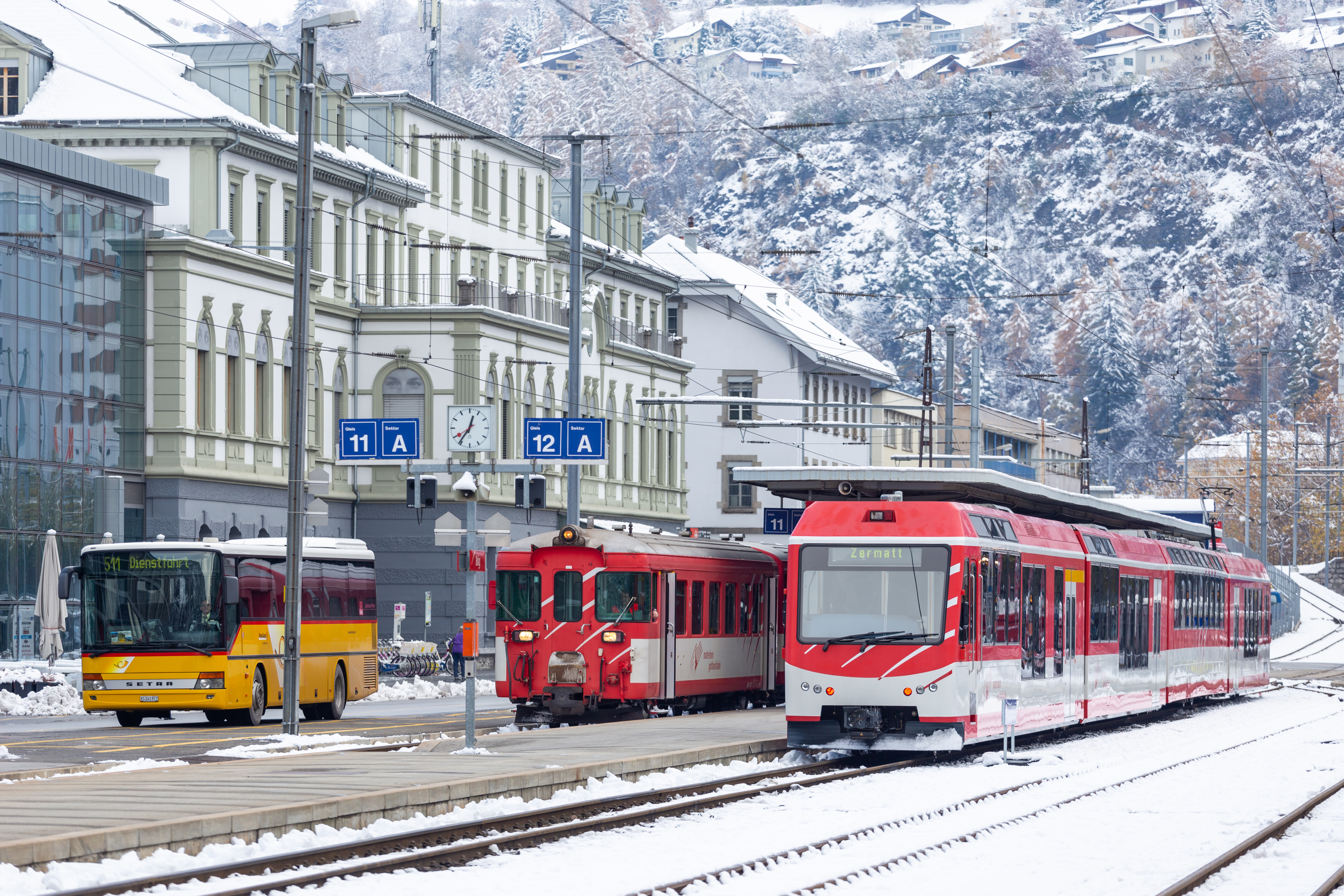
Brig station square with MGB trains

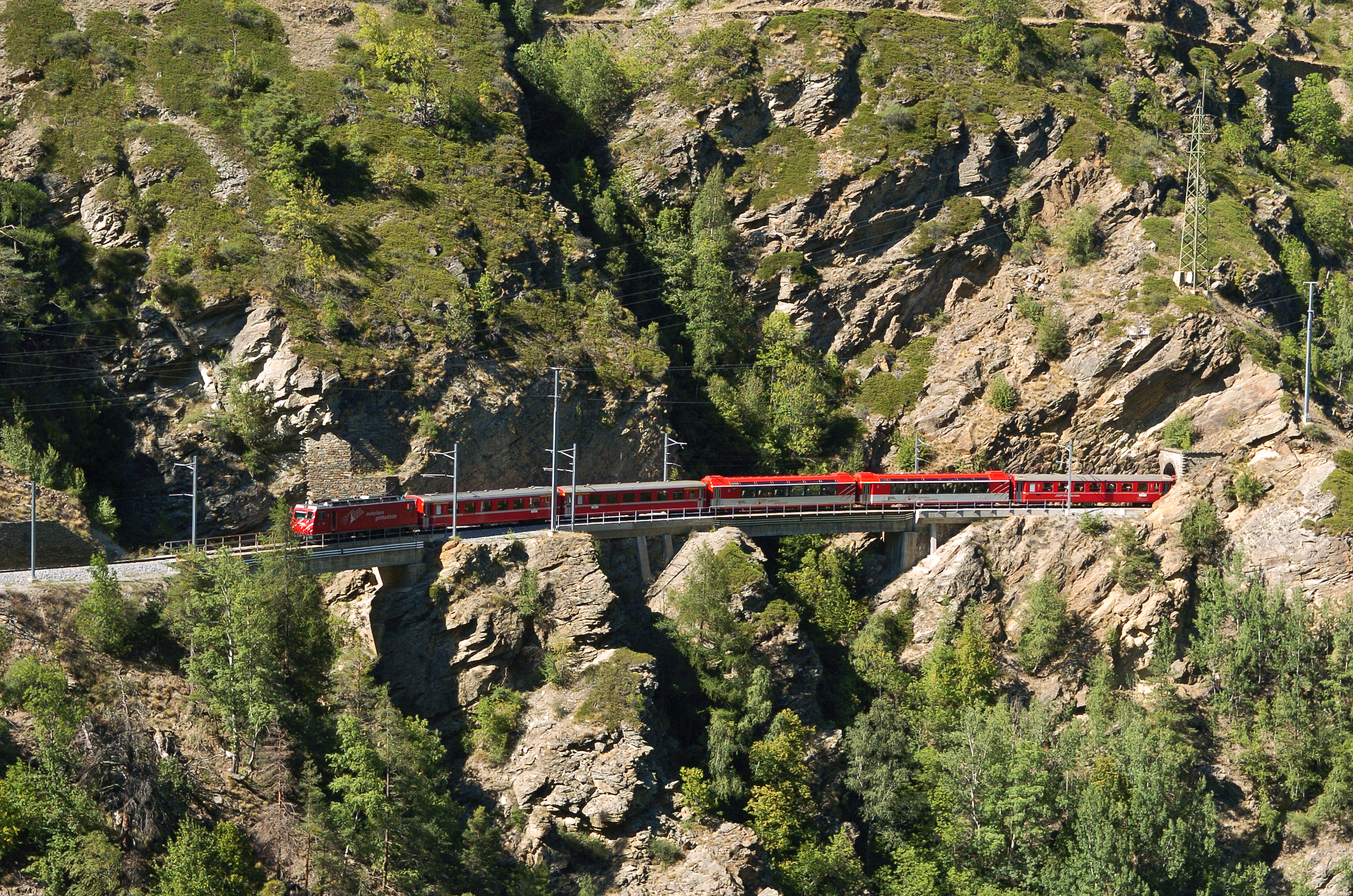
A train near Stalden

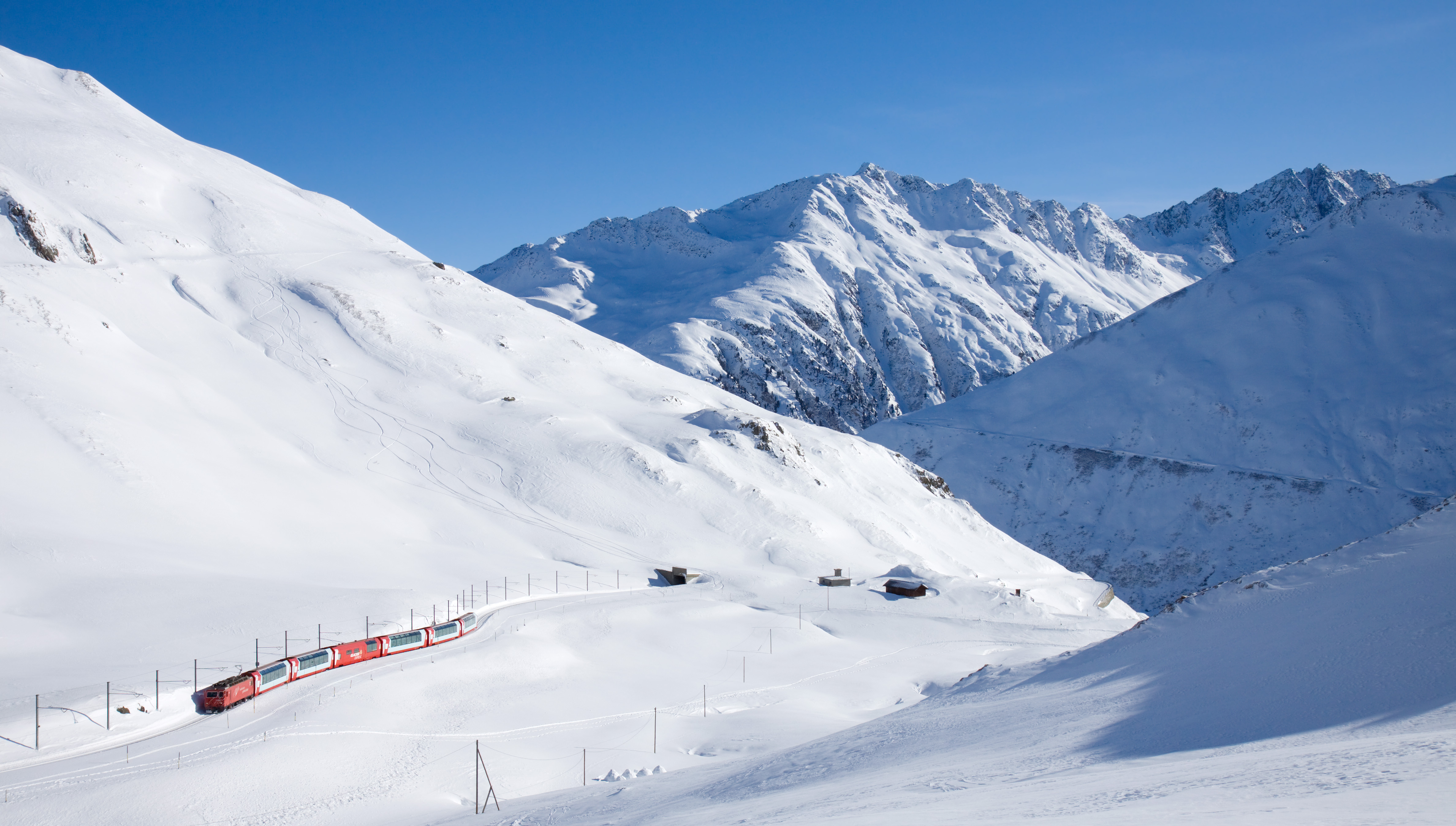
Glacier Express to Zermatt on the rack rail section just before Oberalp Passhöhe

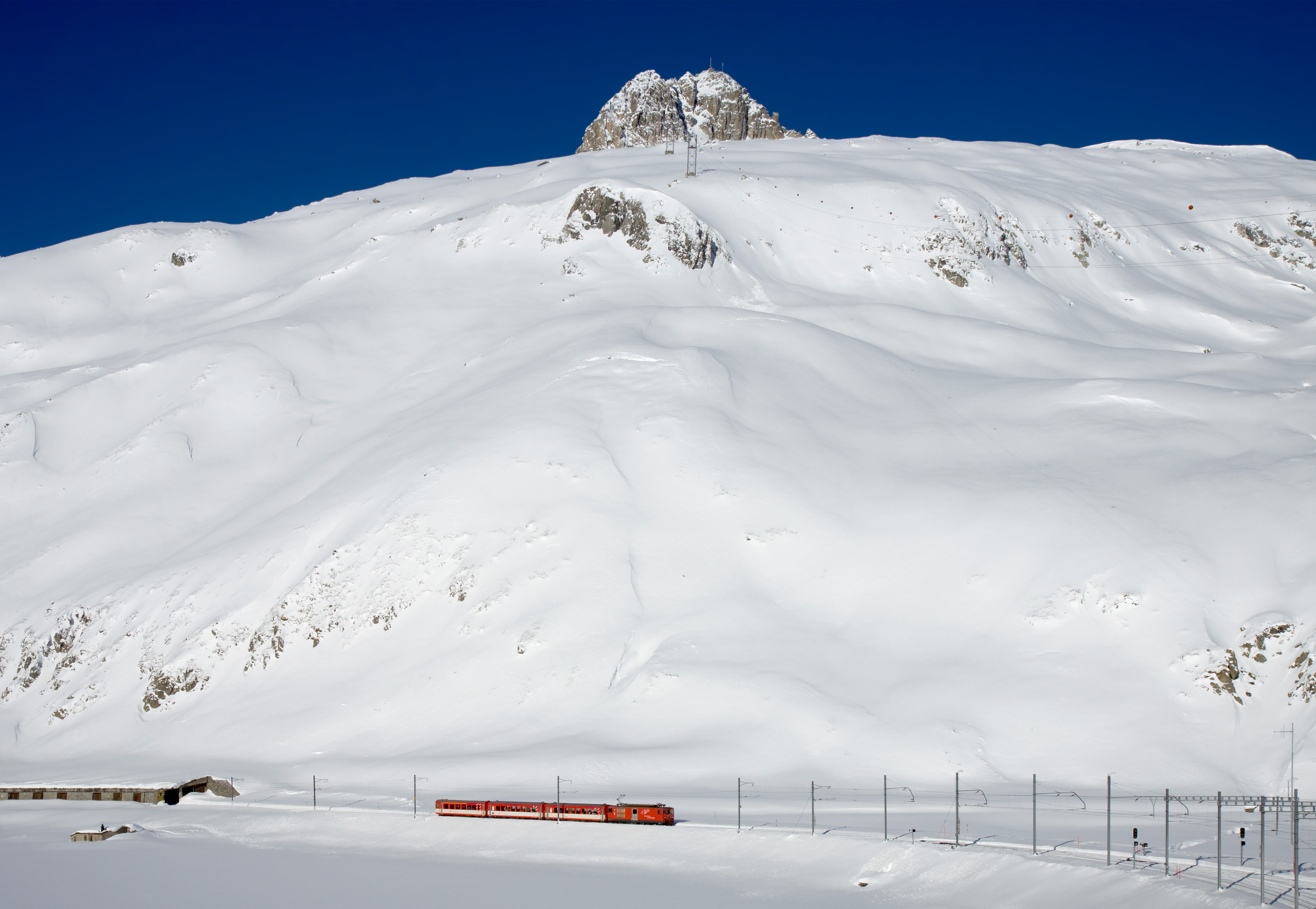
Push-Pull train at the Oberalpsee

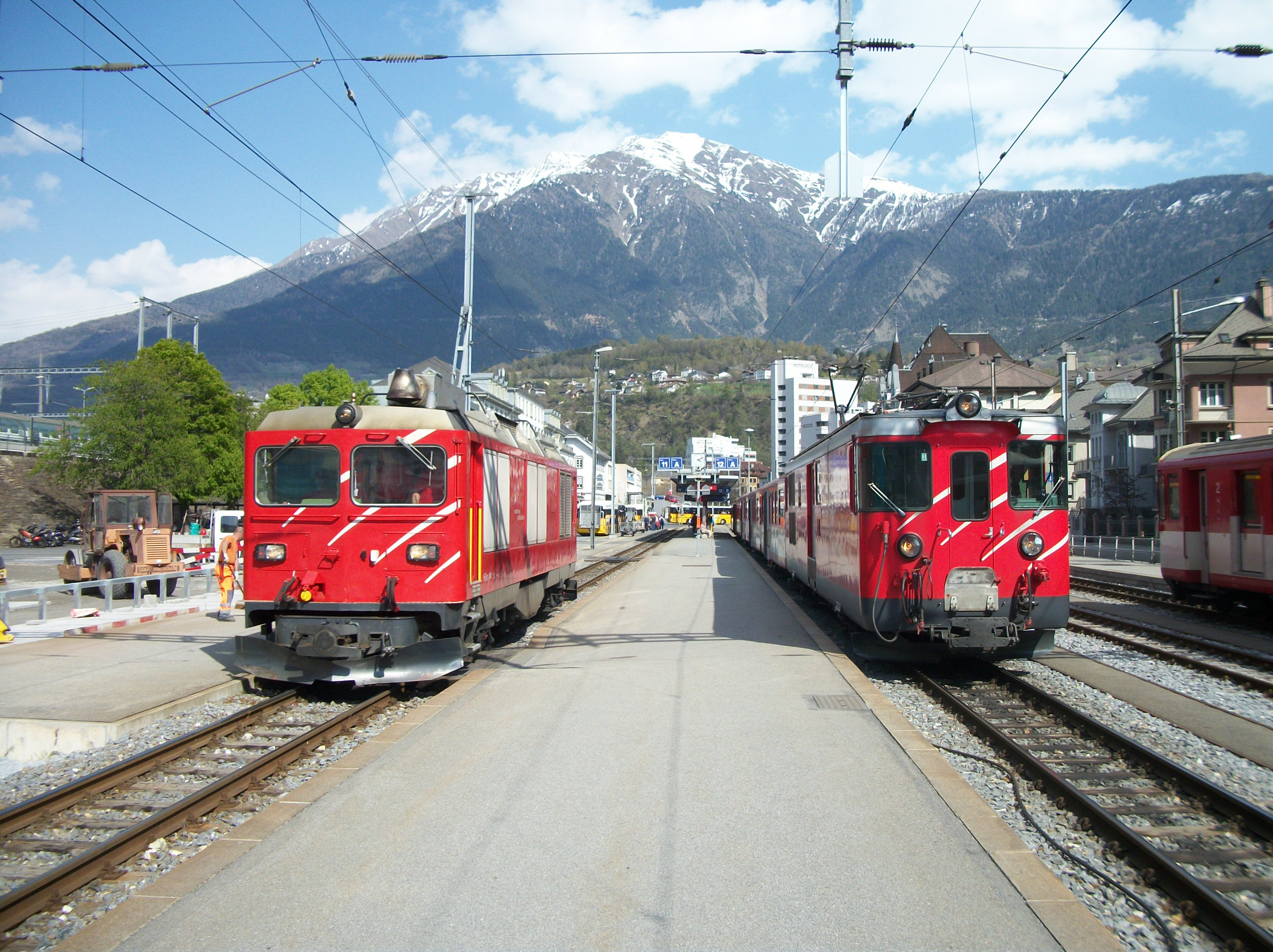
Matterhorn Gotthard Bahn trains at Brig, Switzerland

== See also ==
- List of narrow-gauge railways in Switzerland
- List of railway companies in Switzerland
- Rail transport in Switzerland
