= Serravalle, Switzerland =

Serravalle
- Municipality
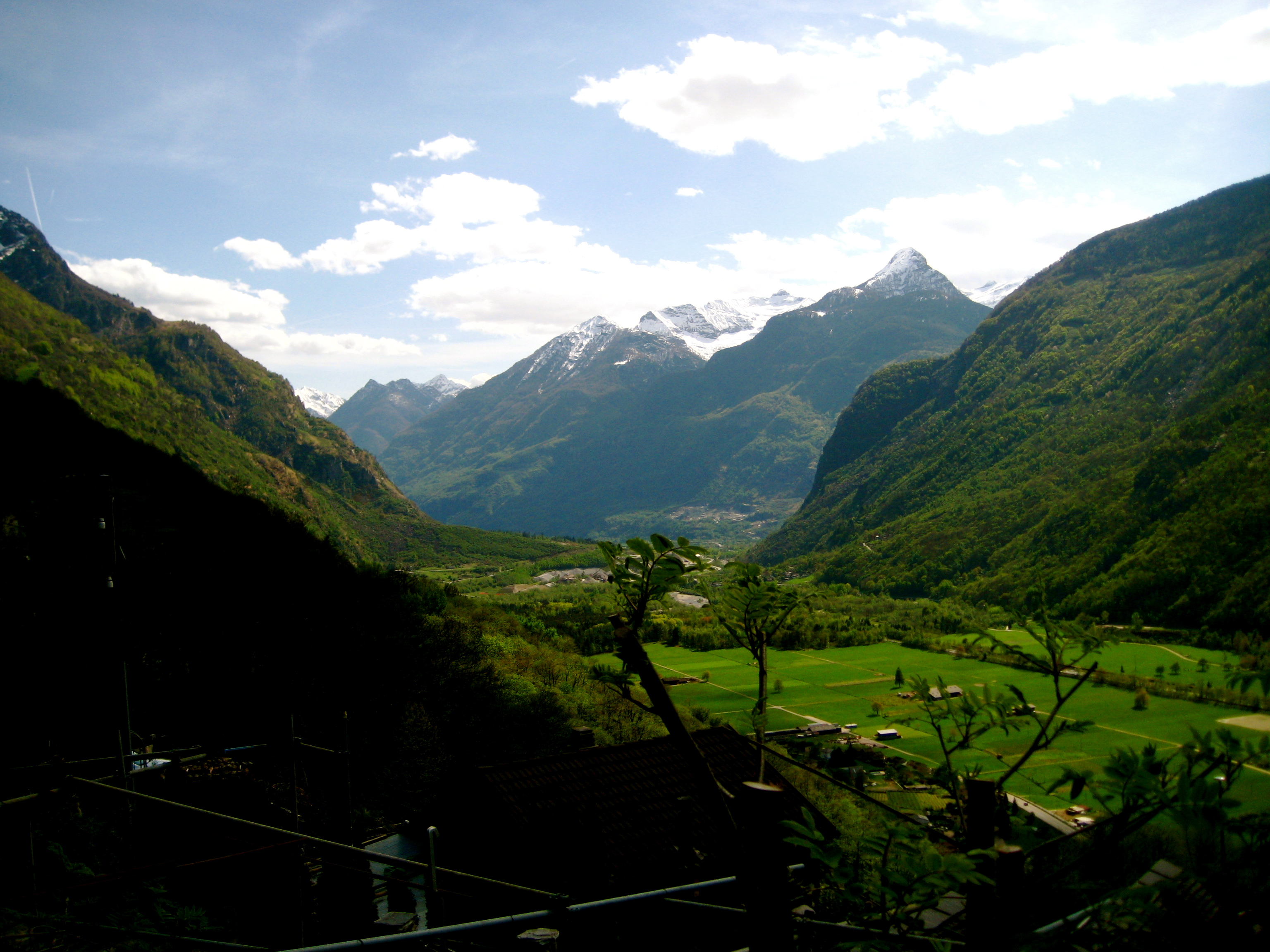
- Malvaglia village in Serravalle

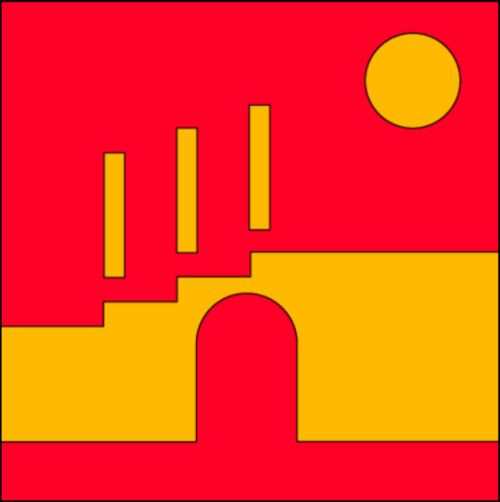
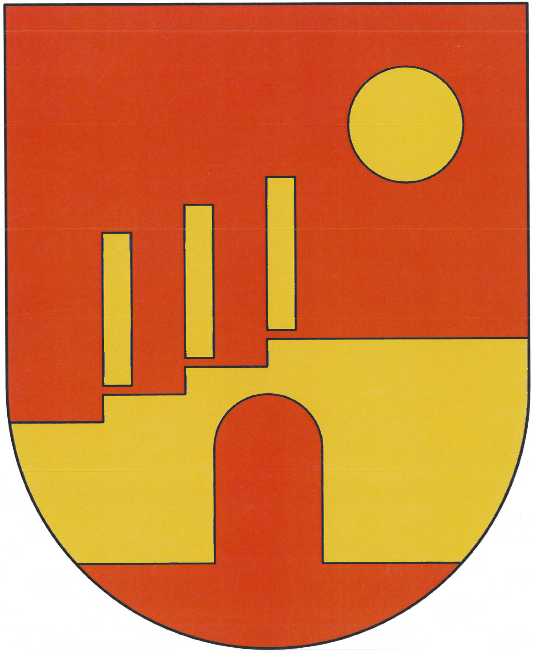
- Flag Coat of arms
- Location of Serravalle
- Location within Switzerland Location within Canton of Ticino
- Coordinates: 46°25′N 8°59′E
- Country: Switzerland
- Canton: Ticino
- District: Blenio

Government
  - Mayor: Sindaco; Luca Bianchetti FDP.The Liberals

Area
  - Total: 96.92 km^{2} (37.42 sq mi)

Population (December 2010)
  - Total: 1,992
  - Density: 20.55/km^{2} (53.23/sq mi)
- Time zone: UTC+01:00 (CET)
  - Summer (DST): UTC+02:00 (CEST)
- Postal code: 6713, 6714, 6721
- SFOS number: 5050
- ISO 3166 code: CH-TI
- Surrounded by: Acquarossa, Biasca, Bodio, Blenio, Hinterrhein (GR), Mesocco (GR), Rossa (GR), Sobrio
- Website: https://www.serravalle.ch SFSO statistics

Serravalle is a municipality in the district of Blenio in the canton of Ticino in Switzerland. It was formed on 1 April 2012 by the merger of the former municipalities of Malvaglia, Semione and Ludiano.

== History ==
=== Ludiano ===
In 1926, a grave was discovered which contained Iron Age grave offerings. The modern municipality of Ludiano is first mentioned in 1211 as Luguilano. It was mentioned as a local center for surrounding farmhouses and villages in 1351.

The parish church of S. Secondo is first mentioned in 1293. It was rebuilt in 1779–82, though the older romanesque clock tower was retained.

In the past, the main sources of income were crops, livestock and vineyards. This income was supplemented by money sent back to the village by emigrants to other European countries. After the emigration-related decline in the mid-19th century, the number of inhabitants has increased in the last decades of the 20th century and has led to numerous new homes. In 2000 about half the jobs in the village were in manufacturing and the services sector accounted for about a fifth of the jobs. Two-thirds of the working population earned their livelihood outside the community.

=== Malvaglia ===
Malvaglia is first mentioned in 1205 as de Malvallia. In German, it was previously known as Manglia. Malvaglia's development and history is closely tied to the development and history of the Blenio valley. In the settlement of Rongier, an ancient town on the Lukmanier road, a Roman coin hoard was found. The settlement is also home to the Casa Baggio. Casa Baggio was built in the 16th century and expanded in the 17th. It was probably the ruling seat of the bailiff. The building is now listed as a historic building. Above the village is also the remains of Casa dei pagani, a cave castle from the 11th–13th Centuries.

The original, parish church was dedicated to St. Benedict and first mentioned in 1207. The current building, with St. Martin as the patron saint is from 1602 to 1603, but the bell tower is from the 13th Century.

The local economy was dominated by agriculture, animal husbandry, vineyards. The emigration in until the 19th century to Italy and in the 19th and 20th centuries to France, England, and America, led to a sharp population decline. Between 1933 and 1959, the first cable car in the Canton was in operation between Malvaglia and Ponterio in the Malvaglia Valley. In 1995 a new line was inaugurated on Mount Dagro. In the 1940s for the construction of the dam, a road was built into the Malvaglia Valley. The ring road around the village open in 1976. In 2000 about one-third and one-half of the workers were employed in manufacturing and the services sectors, respectively. More than half of employed persons worked outside of the municipality.

== Geography ==
As of the 2004/2009 survey, Serravalle has an area of 96.8 km^{2} (37.37 sq mi). Of this area, about 12.4% is used for agricultural purposes, while 47.2% is forested. Of the rest of the land, 1.8% is settled (buildings or roads) and 38.6% is unproductive land. In the 2004/09 survey a total of 108 ha (270 acres) or about 1.1% of the total area was covered with buildings, an increase of 16 ha (40 acres) over the 1983 amount. Of the agricultural land, 52 ha (130 acres) is used for orchards and vineyards, 202 ha (500 acres) is fields and grasslands and 1,080 ha (2,700 acres) consists of alpine grazing areas. Since 1983 the amount of agricultural land has decreased by 198 ha (490 acres). Over the same time period the amount of forested land has increased by 519 ha (1,280 acres). Rivers and lakes cover 120 ha (300 acres) in the municipality.

== Demographics ==
Serravalle has a population (as of December 2020) of 2,079. As of 2015, 8.4% of the population are resident foreign nationals. Over the last 5 years (2010–2015) the population has changed at a rate of 4.17%. The birth rate in the municipality, in 2015, was 6.3, while the death rate was 10.6 per thousand residents.

As of 2015, children and teenagers (0–19 years old) make up 20.1% of the population, while adults (20–64 years old) are 55.9% of the population and seniors (over 64 years old) make up 24.0%. The population of Serravalle is older than the national average. In 2015 there were 499 residents who were over 65 years old (24% vs 18% nationally) and out of those 176 who were over 80 (8.5% vs 5% nationally). In 2015 there were 890 single residents, 894 people who were married or in a civil partnership, 130 widows or widowers and 161 divorced residents.

In 2015, there were 897 private households in Serravalle with an average household size of 2.27 persons. In 2015, about 85.9% of all buildings in the municipality were single family homes, which is much greater than the percentage in the canton (68.1%) and much greater than the percentage nationally (57.4%). In 2014, the rate of construction of new housing units per 1,000 residents was 2.89. The vacancy rate for the municipality, in 2016, was 0.54%.

== Historic Population ==
The historical population is given in the following chart:

== Heritage sites of national significance ==
The Casa dei pagani (a cave castle) and the parish church of S. Martino with its ossuary and churchyard in Malvaglia and the Parish Church of S. Maria Assunta with Ossuary, the Oratory of S. Maria Bambina a Navone and the ruins of Serravalle Castle in Semione are listed as Swiss heritage site of national significance. The villages of Rongie/Orino, Semione, Navone and the Val Malvaglia region are all listed on the Inventory of Swiss Heritage Sites.

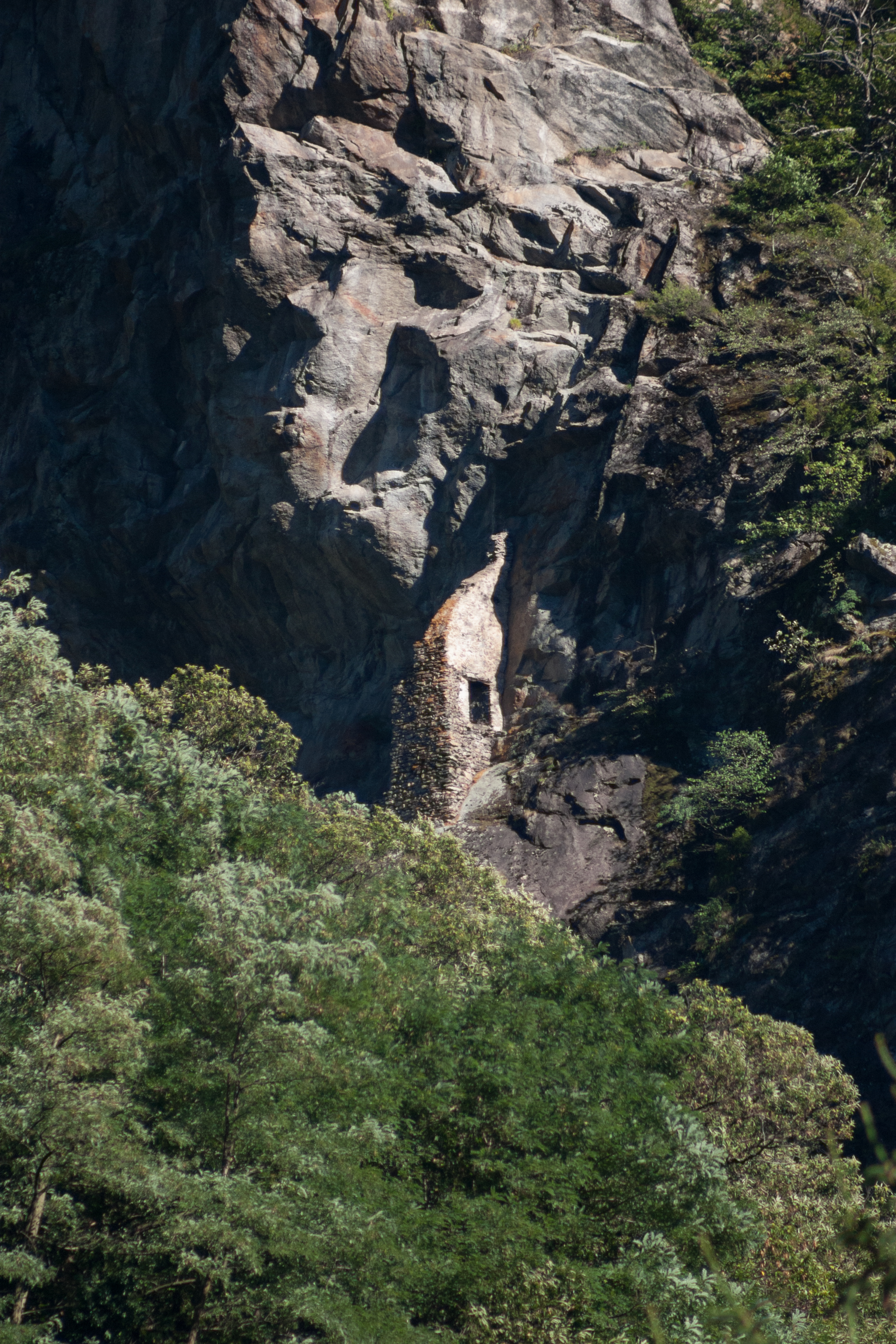
Casa dei pagani, a cave castle

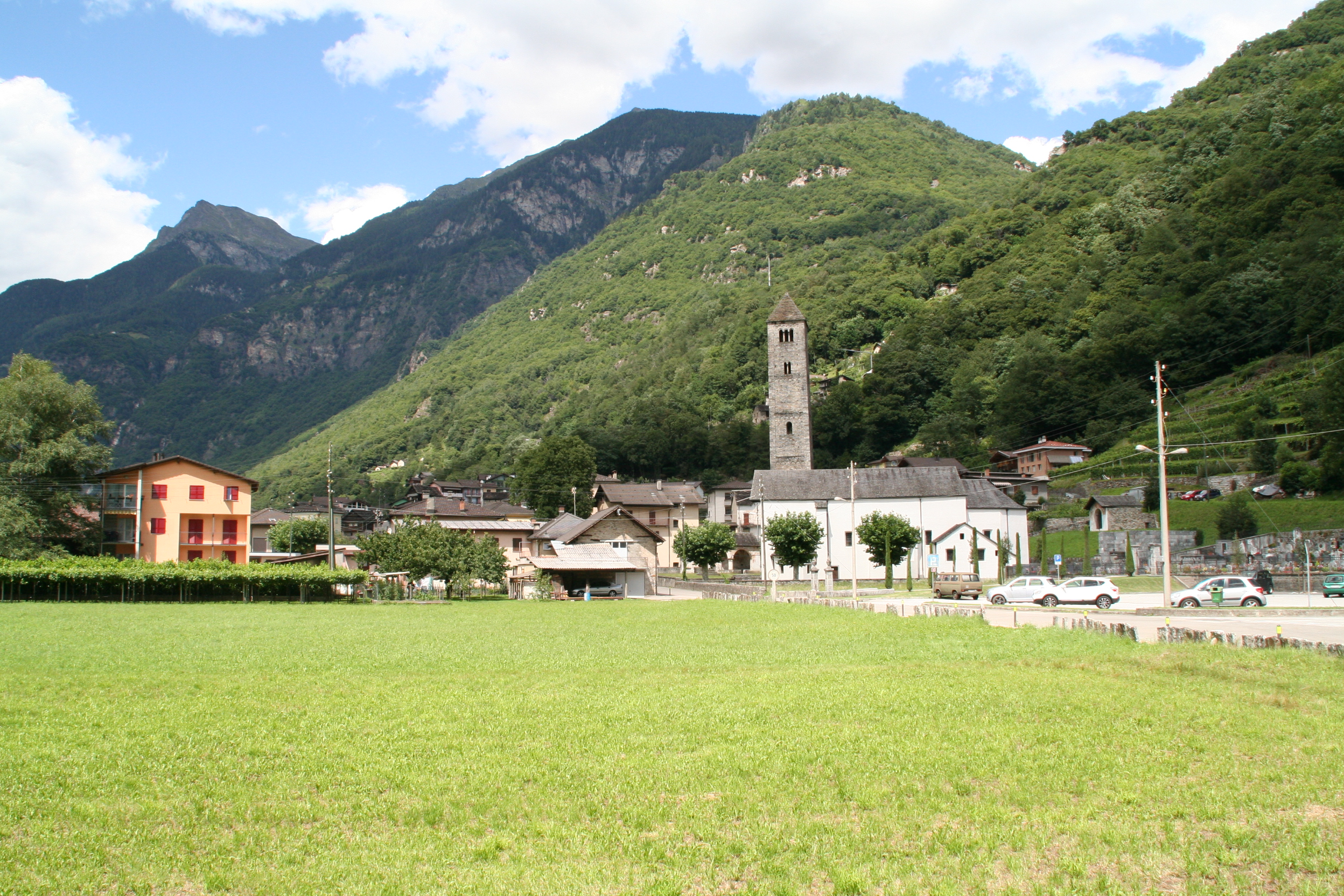
Parish Church of S. Martino with ossuary and churchyard

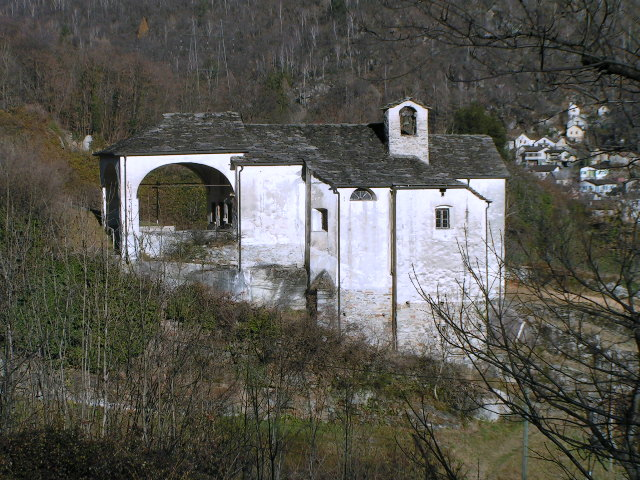
Parish Church of S. Maria Assunta

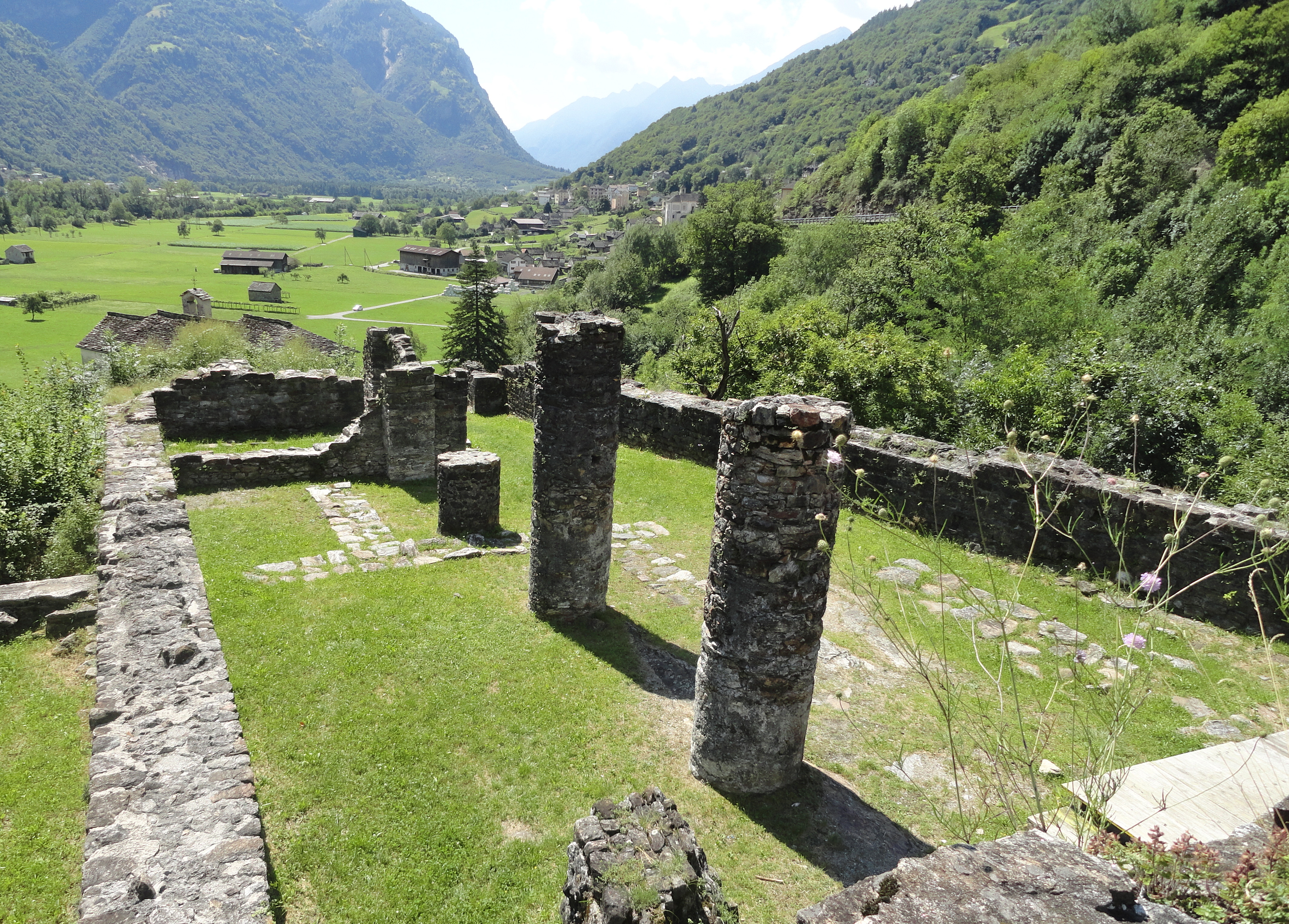
Ruins of Serravalle Castle

== Economy ==
Serravalle is classed as an industrial-tertiary municipality, a municipality where agriculture and manufacturing play a minor role in the economy.

As of 2014, there were a total of 554 people employed in the municipality. Of these, a total of 118 people worked in 49 businesses in the primary economic sector. The secondary sector employed 267 workers in 34 separate businesses, of which there were 6 small businesses with a total of 123 employees and one mid sized business with a total of 89 employees. Finally, the tertiary sector provided 169 jobs in 84 businesses.

In 2015, a total of 2.9% of the population received social assistance.

In 2015, the average cantonal, municipal and church tax rate in the municipality for a couple with two children making SFr 80,000 was 2.4% while the rate for a single person making SFr 150,000 was 16.1%, both of which are close to the average for the canton. The canton has one of the lowest average tax rates for those making SFr 80,000 and an average rate for those making SFr 150,000. In 2013, the average income in the municipality per tax payer was SFr 56,478 and the per person average was SFr 26,684, which is less than the cantonal average of SFr 76,339 and SFr 33,527 and the national per taxpayer average of SFr 82,682 and the per person average of SFr 35,825.

== Politics ==
In the 2015 federal election, the most popular party was the Ticino League with 23.5% of the vote. The next three most popular parties were the FDP (21.9%), the CVP (21.2%) and the SP (14.1%). In the federal election, a total of 975 votes were cast, and the voter turnout was 53.7%.
