= Ludiano =

- Former municipality
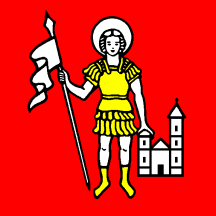
- Flag Coat of arms
- Location of Ludiano
- Location within Switzerland Location within Canton of Ticino
- Coordinates: 46°25′N 8°58′E
- Country: Switzerland
- Canton: Ticino
- District: Blenio

Area
  - Total: 6.2 km^{2} (2.4 sq mi)
- Elevation: 477 m (1,565 ft)

Population (December 2004)
  - Total: 346
  - Density: 56/km^{2} (140/sq mi)
- Time zone: UTC+01:00 (CET)
  - Summer (DST): UTC+02:00 (CEST)
- Postal code: 6721
- SFOS number: 5040
- ISO 3166 code: CH-TI
- Surrounded by: Acquarossa, Malvaglia, Semione, Sobrio
- Website: SFSO statistics

Ludiano is a former municipality in the district of Blenio in the canton of Ticino in Switzerland. Since 15 March 2011, it is part of the municipality Serravalle.

== History ==
In 1926 a grave was discovered which contained Iron Age grave offerings. The modern municipality of Ludiano was first mentioned in 1211 as Luguilano. It was mentioned as a local center for surrounding farmhouses and villages in 1351.

The parish church of S. Secondo is first mentioned in 1293. It was rebuilt in 1779–82, though the older romanesque clock tower was retained.

In the past, the main sources of income were crops, livestock and vineyards. This income was supplemented by money sent back to the village by emigrants to other European countries. After the emigration-related decline in the mid-19th century, the number of inhabitants increased in the last decades of the 20th century and has led to numerous new homes. In 2000 about half the jobs in the village were in manufacturing, and the services sector accounted for about a fifth of the jobs. Two-thirds of the working population earned their livelihood outside the community.

== Geography ==
Ludiano has an area, as of 1997, of 6.19 square kilometers (2.39 sq mi). Of this area, 0.53 km^{2} (0.20 sq mi) or 8.6% is used for agricultural purposes, while 4.81 km^{2} (1.86 sq mi) or 77.7% is forested. Of the rest of the land, 0.25 km^{2} (0.097 sq mi) or 4.0% is settled (buildings or roads), 0.07 km^{2} (17 acres) or 1.1% is either rivers or lakes and 0.39 km^{2} (0.15 sq mi) or 6.3% is unproductive land.

Of the built up area, housing and buildings made up 2.9% and transportation infrastructure made up 1.0%. Out of the forested land, 75.1% of the total land area is heavily forested and 2.6% is covered with orchards or small clusters of trees. Of the agricultural land, 4.0% is used for growing crops, while 1.6% is used for orchards or vine crops and 2.9% is used for alpine pastures. All the water in the municipality is flowing water. Of the unproductive areas, 2.3% is unproductive vegetation and 4.0% is too rocky for vegetation.

The municipality is located in the Blenio district, on the right side of the lower Blenio valley. The municipalities of Ludiano, Malvaglia and Semione merged on 15 March 2011 into the new municipality Serravalle.

== Coat of arms ==
The blazon of the municipal coat of arms is Gules St. Secundus clerad Or holding in his dexter hand a pennant Argent and in his sinister a Church of the last.

== Demographics ==
Ludiano has a population (as of December 2020) of 349. As of 2008, 6.2% of the population are foreign nationals. Over the last 10 years (1997–2007) the population has changed at a rate of 32.6%.

Most of the population (as of 2000) speaks Italian(87.6%), with German being second most common ( 5.8%) and French being third ( 3.1%). Of the Swiss national languages (as of 2000), 17 speak German, 9 people speak French, 255 people speak Italian. The remainder (10 people) speak another language.

As of 2008, the gender distribution of the population was 47.4% male and 52.6% female. The population was made up of 170 Swiss men (45.0% of the population), and 9 (2.4%) non-Swiss men. There were 188 Swiss women (49.7%), and 11 (2.9%) non-Swiss women. In 2008 there were 3 live births to Swiss citizens and births to non-Swiss citizens, and in the same time span there were 3 deaths of Swiss citizens and 1 non-Swiss citizen death. Ignoring immigration and emigration, the population of Swiss citizens remained the same while the foreign population decreased by 1. There was 1 non-Swiss man who immigrated from another country to Switzerland. The total Swiss population change in 2008 (from all sources) was an increase of 3 and the non-Swiss population change was a decrease of 1 people. This represents a population growth rate of 0.5%.

The age distribution, as of 2009, in Ludiano is; 50 children or 13.2% of the population are between 0 and 9 years old and 48 teenagers or 12.7% are between 10 and 19. Of the adult population, 32 people or 8.5% of the population are between 20 and 29 years old. 47 people or 12.4% are between 30 and 39, 62 people or 16.4% are between 40 and 49, and 31 people or 8.2% are between 50 and 59. The senior population distribution is 38 people or 10.1% of the population are between 60 and 69 years old, 39 people or 10.3% are between 70 and 79, there are 31 people or 8.2% who are over 80.

As of 2000 the average number of residents per living room was 0.54 which is fewer people per room than the cantonal average of 0.6 per room. In this case, a room is defined as space of a housing unit of at least 4 m^{2} (43 sq ft) as normal bedrooms, dining rooms, living rooms, kitchens and habitable cellars and attics. About 58.1% of the total households were owner occupied, or in other words did not pay rent (though they may have a mortgage or a rent-to-own agreement).

As of 2000, there were 129 private households in the municipality, and an average of 2.2 persons per household. In 2000 there were 144 single family homes (or 80.0% of the total) out of a total of 180 inhabited buildings. There were 17 two family buildings (9.4%) and 16 multi-family buildings (8.9%). There were also 3 buildings in the municipality that were multipurpose buildings (used for both housing and commercial or another purpose).

The vacancy rate for the municipality, in 2008, was 0%. In 2000 there were 236 apartments in the municipality. The most common apartment size was the 4 room apartment of which there were 75. There were 18 single room apartments and 63 apartments with five or more rooms. Of these apartments, a total of 129 apartments (54.7% of the total) were permanently occupied, while 102 apartments (43.2%) were seasonally occupied and 5 apartments (2.1%) were empty. As of 2007, the construction rate of new housing units was 0 new units per 1000 residents.

The historical population is given in the following table:

year	population
1567	250
1808	291
1850	389
1900	294
1950	242
2000	291

== Politics ==
In the 2007 federal election the most popular party was the CVP which received 39.88% of the vote. The next three most popular parties were the FDP (18.9%), the SP (18.23%) and the Ticino League (16.24%). In the federal election, a total of 159 votes were cast, and the voter turnout was 61.6%.

In the 2007 Gran Consiglio election, there were a total of 260 registered voters in Ludiano, of which 195 or 75.0% voted. 2 blank ballots were cast, leaving 193 valid ballots in the election. The most popular party was the PPD+GenGiova which received 60 or 31.1% of the vote. The next three most popular parties were; the PS (with 46 or 23.8%), the SSI (with 31 or 16.1%) and the LEGA (with 27 or 14.0%).

In the 2007 Consiglio di Stato election, there were 2 blank ballots, which left 193 valid ballots in the election. The most popular party was the PPD which received 55 or 28.5% of the vote. The next three most popular parties were; the PS (with 51 or 26.4%), the LEGA (with 39 or 20.2%) and the SSI (with 25 or 13.0%).

== Economy ==
As of 2007, Ludiano had an unemployment rate of 2.88%. As of 2005, there were 25 people employed in the primary economic sector and about 10 businesses involved in this sector. 41 people are employed in the secondary sector and there are 4 businesses in this sector. 10 people are employed in the tertiary sector, with 6 businesses in this sector. There were 125 residents of the municipality who were employed in some capacity, of which females made up 40.8% of the workforce.

In 2000, there were 34 workers who commuted into the municipality and 87 workers who commuted away. The municipality is a net exporter of workers, with about 2.6 workers leaving the municipality for every one entering. Of the working population, 10.4% used public transportation to get to work, and 67.2% used a private car.

== Religion ==
From the 2000 census, 230 or 79.0% were Roman Catholic, while 19 or 6.5% belonged to the Swiss Reformed Church. There are 29 individuals (or about 9.97% of the population) who belong to another church (not listed on the census), and 13 individuals (or about 4.47% of the population) did not answer the question.

== Education ==
The entire Swiss population is generally well educated. In Ludiano about 70.3% of the population (between age 25–64) have completed either non-mandatory upper secondary education or additional higher education (either University or a Fachhochschule).

In Ludiano there are a total of 88 students (as of 2009). The Ticino education system provides up to three years of non-mandatory kindergarten and in Ludiano there are 16 children in kindergarten. The primary school program lasts for five years and includes both a standard school and a special school. In the municipality, 30 students attend the standard primary schools and 2 students attend the special school. In the lower secondary school system, students either attend a two-year middle school followed by a two-year pre-apprenticeship or they attend a four-year program to prepare for higher education. There are 24 students in the two-year middle school and 0 in their pre-apprenticeship, while 5 students are in the four-year advanced program.

The upper secondary school includes several options, but at the end of the upper secondary program, a student will be prepared to enter a trade or to continue on to a university or college. In Ticino, vocational students may either attend school while working on their internship or apprenticeship (which takes three or four years) or may attend school followed by an internship or apprenticeship (which takes one year as a full-time student or one and a half to two years as a part-time student). There was 1 vocational student who was attending school full-time and 8 who attend part-time.

The professional program lasts three years and prepares a student for a job in engineering, nursing, computer science, business, tourism and similar fields. There are 2 students in the professional program.

As of 2000, there were 3 students in Ludiano who came from another municipality, while 21 residents attended schools outside the municipality.
