= Malvaglia =

- Former municipality
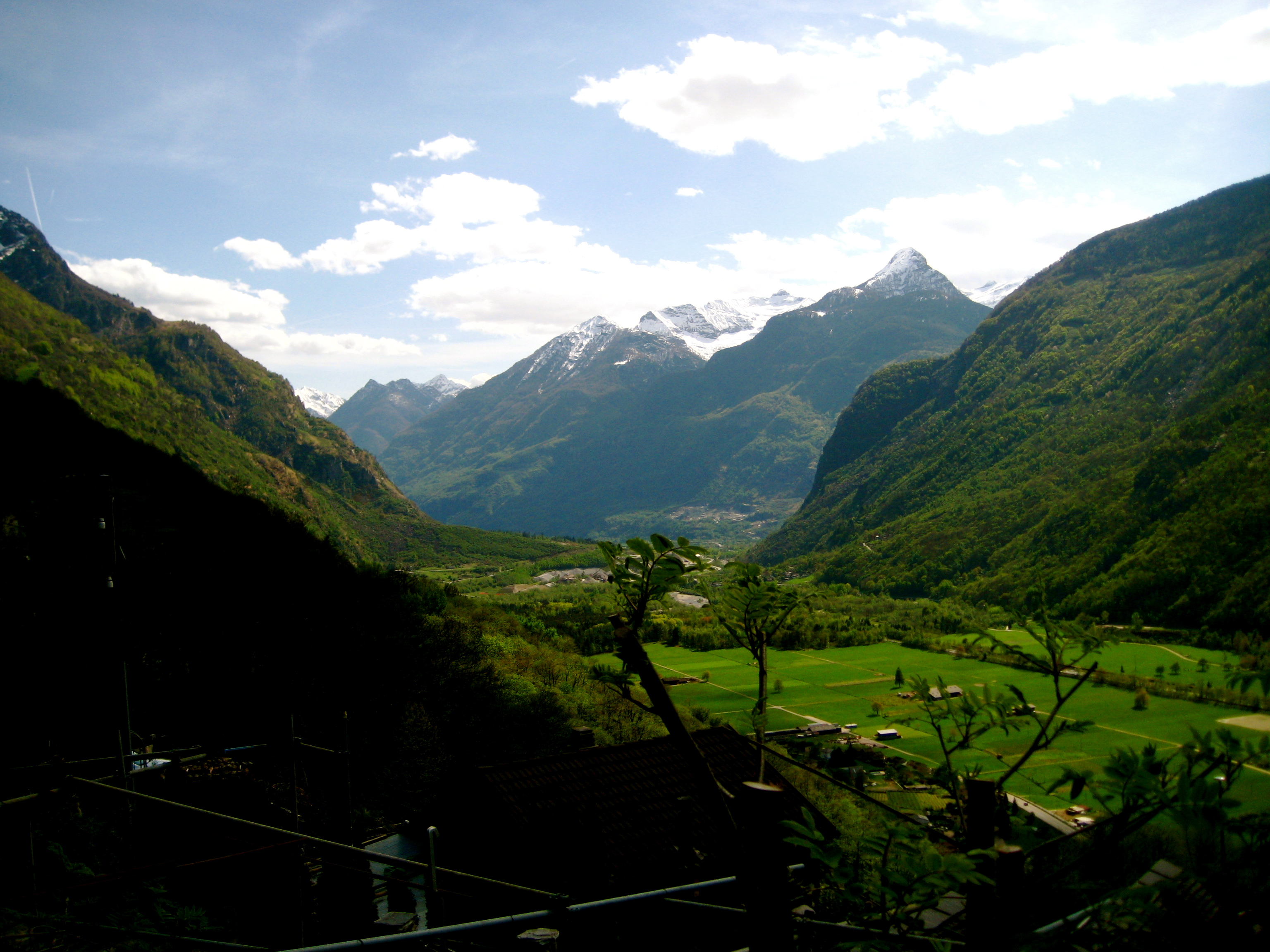
- Malvaglia village

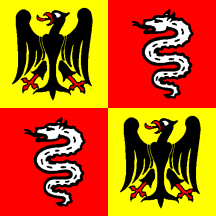
- Flag Coat of arms
- Location of Malvaglia
- Location within Switzerland Location within Canton of Ticino
- Coordinates: 46°25′N 8°59′E
- Country: Switzerland
- Canton: Ticino
- District: Blenio

Area
  - Total: 80.3 km^{2} (31.0 sq mi)
- Elevation: 389 m (1,276 ft)

Population (December 2004)
  - Total: 1,276
  - Density: 15.9/km^{2} (41.2/sq mi)
- Time zone: UTC+01:00 (CET)
  - Summer (DST): UTC+02:00 (CEST)
- Postal code: 6713
- SFOS number: 5041
- ISO 3166 code: CH-TI
- Surrounded by: Acquarossa, Biasca, Blenio, Hinterrhein (GR), Ludiano, Mesocco (GR), Rossa (GR), Semione
- Website: SFSO statistics

Malvaglia is a former municipality in the district of Blenio in the canton of Ticino in Switzerland. Since 15 March 2011, it is part of the municipality Serravalle. The reservoir Bacino di Val Malvaglia is located above the village of Malvaglia.

== History ==
Malvaglia is first mentioned in 1205 as de Malvallia. In German it used to be known as Manglia. Malvaglia's development and history is closely tied to the development and history of the Blenio valley. In the settlement of Rongier, an ancient town on the Lukmanier road, a Roman coin hoard was found. The settlement is also home to the Casa Baggio. Casa Baggio was built in the 16th century and expanded in the 17th. It was probably the ruling seat of the bailiff. The building is now listed as a historic building. Above the village is also the remains of Casa dei pagani, a cave castle from the 11th-13th Centuries.

The original, parish church was dedicated to St. Benedict and first mentioned in 1207. The current building, with St. Martin as the patron saint is from 1602 to 1603, but the bell tower is from the 13th Century.

The local economy was dominated by agriculture, animal husbandry, vineyards. The emigration in until the 19th century to Italy and in the 19th and 20th centuries to France, England, and America, led to a sharp population decline. Between 1933 and 1959, the first cable car in the Canton was in operation between Malvaglia and Ponterio in the Malvaglia Valley. In 1995 a new line was inaugurated on Mount Dagro. In the 1940s for the construction of the dam, a road was built into the Malvaglia Valley. The ring road around the village open in 1976. In 2000 about one-third and one-half of the workers were employed in manufacturing and the services sectors, respectively. More than half of employed persons worked outside of the municipality.

== Geography ==
Malvaglia has an area, as of 1997, of 80.31 square kilometers (31.01 sq mi). Of this area, 1.78 km^{2} (0.69 sq mi) or 2.2% is used for agricultural purposes, while 31.11 km^{2} (12.01 sq mi) or 38.7% is forested. Of the rest of the land, 1.02 km^{2} (0.39 sq mi) or 1.3% is settled (buildings or roads), 1.12 km^{2} (0.43 sq mi) or 1.4% is either rivers or lakes and 36.74 km^{2} (14.19 sq mi) or 45.7% is unproductive land.

Of the built up area, housing and buildings made up 0.8% and transportation infrastructure made up 0.3%. Out of the forested land, 28.1% of the total land area is heavily forested and 1.7% is covered with orchards or small clusters of trees. Of the agricultural land, 1.0% is used for growing crops. Of the water in the municipality, 0.3% is in lakes and 1.1% is in rivers and streams. Of the unproductive areas, 15.4% is unproductive vegetation and 30.3% is too rocky for vegetation.

The municipality was located in the Blenio district, on the left bank of the Brenno river. The municipalities of Ludiano, Malvaglia and Semione merged on 15 March 2011 into the new municipality Serravalle.

== Coat of arms ==
The blazon of the municipal coat of arms is Quartered first and fourth Or an Eagle Sable langued, beaked and membered Gules and second and third Gules a Serpent Argent.

== Demographics ==
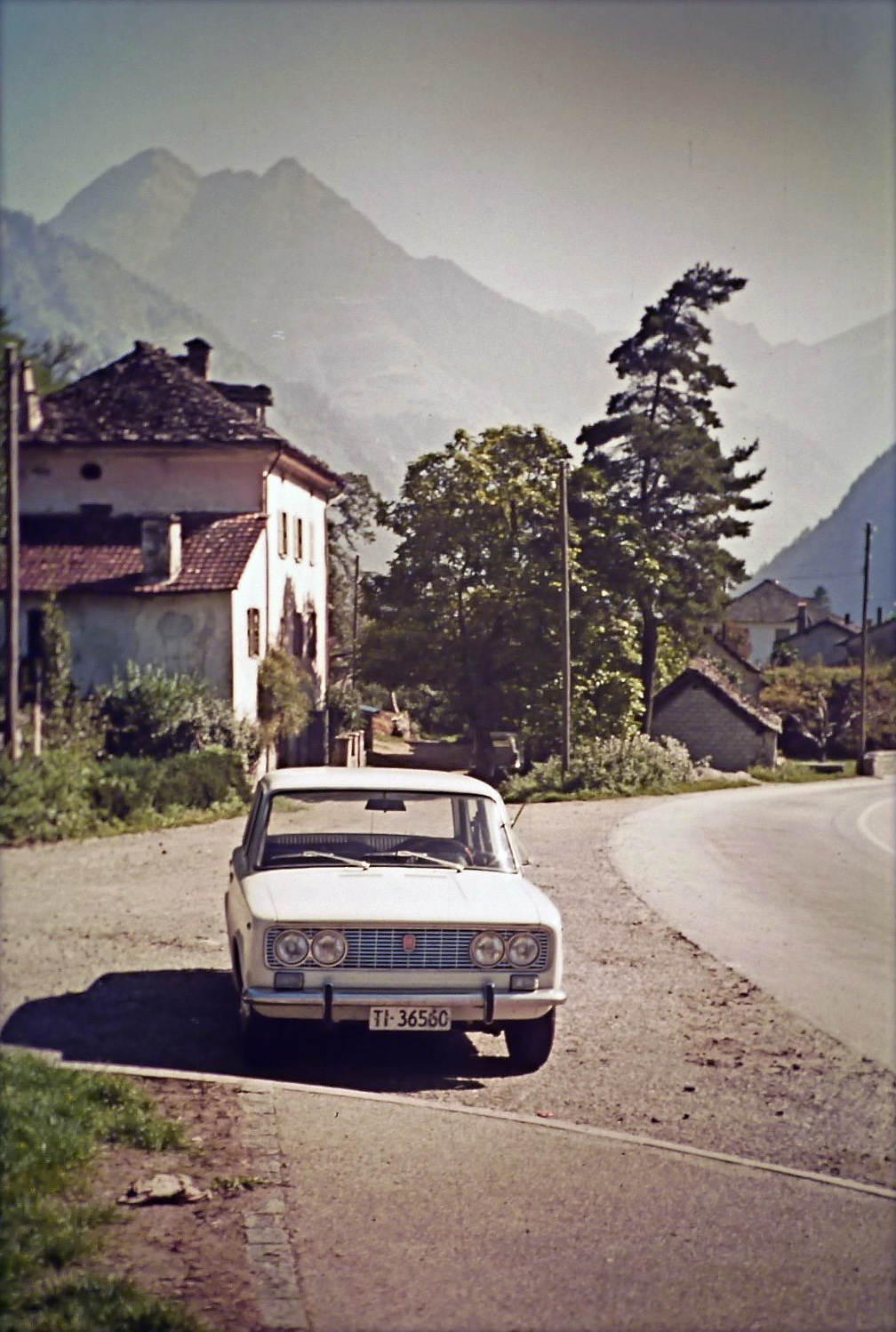
Part of the village in 1972

Malvaglia has a population (as of December 2020) of 1,311. As of 2008, 8.6% of the population are foreign nationals. Over the last 10 years (1997–2007) the population has changed at a rate of 7.6%.

Most of the population (as of 2000) speaks Italian(90.3%), with German being second most common (4.7%) and French being third (2.8%). Of the Swiss national languages (as of 2000), 55 speak German, 33 people speak French, 1,058 people speak Italian, and 3 people speak Romansh. The remainder (23 people) speak another language.

As of 2008, the gender distribution of the population was 51.9% male and 48.1% female. The population was made up of 623 Swiss men (47.3% of the population), and 60 (4.6%) non-Swiss men. There were 588 Swiss women (44.7%), and 45 (3.4%) non-Swiss women.

In 2008 there were 14 live births to Swiss citizens and births to non-Swiss citizens, and in same time span there were 15 deaths of Swiss citizens. Ignoring immigration and emigration, the population of Swiss citizens decreased by 1 while the foreign population remained the same. There was 1 Swiss man and 1 Swiss woman who immigrated back to Switzerland. At the same time, there were 6 non-Swiss men and 2 non-Swiss women who immigrated from another country to Switzerland. The total Swiss population change in 2008 (from all sources) was an increase of 17 and the non-Swiss population change was an increase of 12 people. This represents a population growth rate of 2.3%.

The age distribution, as of 2009, in Malvaglia is; 152 children or 11.6% of the population are between 0 and 9 years old and 122 teenagers or 9.3% are between 10 and 19. Of the adult population, 127 people or 9.7% of the population are between 20 and 29 years old. 199 people or 15.1% are between 30 and 39, 199 people or 15.1% are between 40 and 49, and 153 people or 11.6% are between 50 and 59. The senior population distribution is 141 people or 10.7% of the population are between 60 and 69 years old, 154 people or 11.7% are between 70 and 79, there are 69 people or 5.2% who are over 80.

As of 2000 the average number of residents per living room was 0.58 which is about equal to the cantonal average of 0.6 per room. In this case, a room is defined as space of a housing unit of at least 4 m^{2} (43 sq ft) as normal bedrooms, dining rooms, living rooms, kitchens and habitable cellars and attics. About 64% of the total households were owner occupied, or in other words did not pay rent (though they may have a mortgage or a rent-to-own agreement).

As of 2000, there were 503 private households in the municipality, and an average of 2.3 persons per household. In 2000 there were 557 single family homes (or 79.6% of the total) out of a total of 700 inhabited buildings. There were 94 two family buildings (13.4%) and 28 multi-family buildings (4.0%). There were also 21 buildings in the municipality that were multipurpose buildings (used for both housing and commercial or another purpose).

The vacancy rate for the municipality, in 2008, was 0.1%. In 2000 there were 858 apartments in the municipality. The most common apartment size was the 4-room apartment of which there were 266. There were 40 single room apartments and 195 apartments with five or more rooms. Of these apartments, a total of 503 apartments (58.6% of the total) were permanently occupied, while 341 apartments (39.7%) were seasonally occupied and 14 apartments (1.6%) were empty. As of 2007, the construction rate of new housing units was 0 new units per 1000 residents.

The historical population is given in the following table:

year	population
1602	1,164
1808	1,056
1850	1,647
1880	2,022
1900	1,606
1950	1,120
2000	1,172

== Heritage sites of national significance ==
The Casa dei pagani (a cave castle) and the parish church of S. Martino with its ossuary and churchyard are listed as Swiss heritage site of national significance. The village of Rongie/Orino and the Val Malvaglia region are both listed on the Inventory of Swiss Heritage Sites

== Politics ==
In the 2007 federal election the most popular party was the CVP which received 35.25% of the vote. The next three most popular parties were the FDP (29.28%), the Ticino League (14.6%) and the SP (12.29%). In the federal election, a total of 642 votes were cast, and the voter turnout was 55.4%.

In the 2007 Gran Consiglio election, there were a total of 1,690 registered voters in Malvaglia, of which 823 or 48.7% voted. 13 blank ballots and 2 null ballots were cast, leaving 808 valid ballots in the election. The most popular party was the PLRT which received 205 or 25.4% of the vote. The next three most popular parties were; the PLRT (with 205 or 25.4%), the PS (with 124 or 15.3%) and the LEGA (with 117 or 14.5%).

In the 2007 Consiglio di Stato election, there were 11 blank ballots and 3 null ballots, which left 809 valid ballots in the election. The most popular party was the PPD which received 194 or 24.0% of the vote. The next three most popular parties were; the PLRT (with 187 or 23.1%), the LEGA (with 164 or 20.3%) and the PS (with 127 or 15.7%).

== Economy ==
As of 2007, Malvaglia had an unemployment rate of 2.33%. As of 2005, there were 97 people employed in the primary economic sector and about 43 businesses involved in this sector. 116 people were employed in the secondary sector and there were 14 businesses in this sector. 112 people were employed in the tertiary sector, with 34 businesses in this sector. There were 498 residents of the municipality who were employed in some capacity, of which females made up 34.1% of the workforce.

In 2000, there were 78 workers who commuted into the municipality and 310 workers who commuted away. The municipality is a net exporter of workers, with about 4.0 workers leaving the municipality for every one entering. Of the working population, 6% used public transportation to get to work, and 70.1% used a private car.

As of 2009, there was one hotel in Malvaglia.

== Religion ==
From the 2000 census, 986 or 84.1% were Catholic, while 40 or 3.4% belonged to the Swiss Reformed Church. There are 110 individuals (or about 9.39% of the population) who belong to another church (not listed on the census), and 36 individuals (or about 3.07% of the population) did not answer the question.

== Education ==
The entire Swiss population is generally well educated. In Malvaglia about 68.6% of the population (between age 25–64) have completed either non-mandatory upper secondary education or additional higher education (either University or a Fachhochschule).

In Malvaglia there are a total of 226 students (as of 2009). The Ticino education system provides up to three years of non-mandatory kindergarten and in Malvaglia there are 44 children in kindergarten. The primary school program lasts for five years and includes both a standard school and a special school. In the municipality, 73 students attend the standard primary schools and students attend the special school. In the lower secondary school system, students either attend a two-year middle school followed by a two-year pre-apprenticeship or they attend a four-year program to prepare for higher education. There are 51 students in the two-year middle school and in their pre-apprenticeship, while 16 students are in the four-year advanced program.

The upper secondary school includes several options, but at the end of the upper secondary program, a student will be prepared to enter a trade or to continue on to a university or college. In Ticino, vocational students may either attend school while working on their internship or apprenticeship (which takes three or four years) or may attend school followed by an internship or apprenticeship (which takes one year as a full-time student or one and a half to two years as a part-time student). There are 8 vocational students who are attending school full-time and 33 who attend part-time.

The professional program lasts three years and prepares a student for a job in engineering, nursing, computer science, business, tourism and similar fields. There was 1 student in the professional program.

As of 2000, there were 46 students in Malvaglia who came from another municipality, while 92 residents attended schools outside the municipality.
