= Giuseppe Miccolis =

Italian footballer

Personal information
- Date of birth: 6 April 1973 (age 53)
- Place of birth: Biasca, Switzerland
- Height: 1.73 m (5 ft 8 in)
- Position: Midfielder

Senior career*
Years	Team	Apps	(Gls)
1991–1994	FC Locarno	59	(3)
1994–1997	FC Winterthur	78	(4)
1997–1998	Leichhardt Tigers	15	(3)
1998–2001	AC Bellinzona	91	(2)
2001	FC Baden	14	(2)
2001–2002	FC Locarno	12	(1)
2002–2004	AC Bellinzona	64	(3)
2004–2005	AC Lugano	31	(1)
2005–2008	AC Bellinzona	89	(4)
2009	GC Biaschesi		
- * Club domestic league appearances and goals

Giuseppe Miccolis (born 6 April 1973) is an Italian former football midfielder.

== Career ==
On 18 February 2009 Miccolis left AC Bellinzona of the Swiss Super League and joined GC Biaschesi.
