= Semione =

- Former municipality
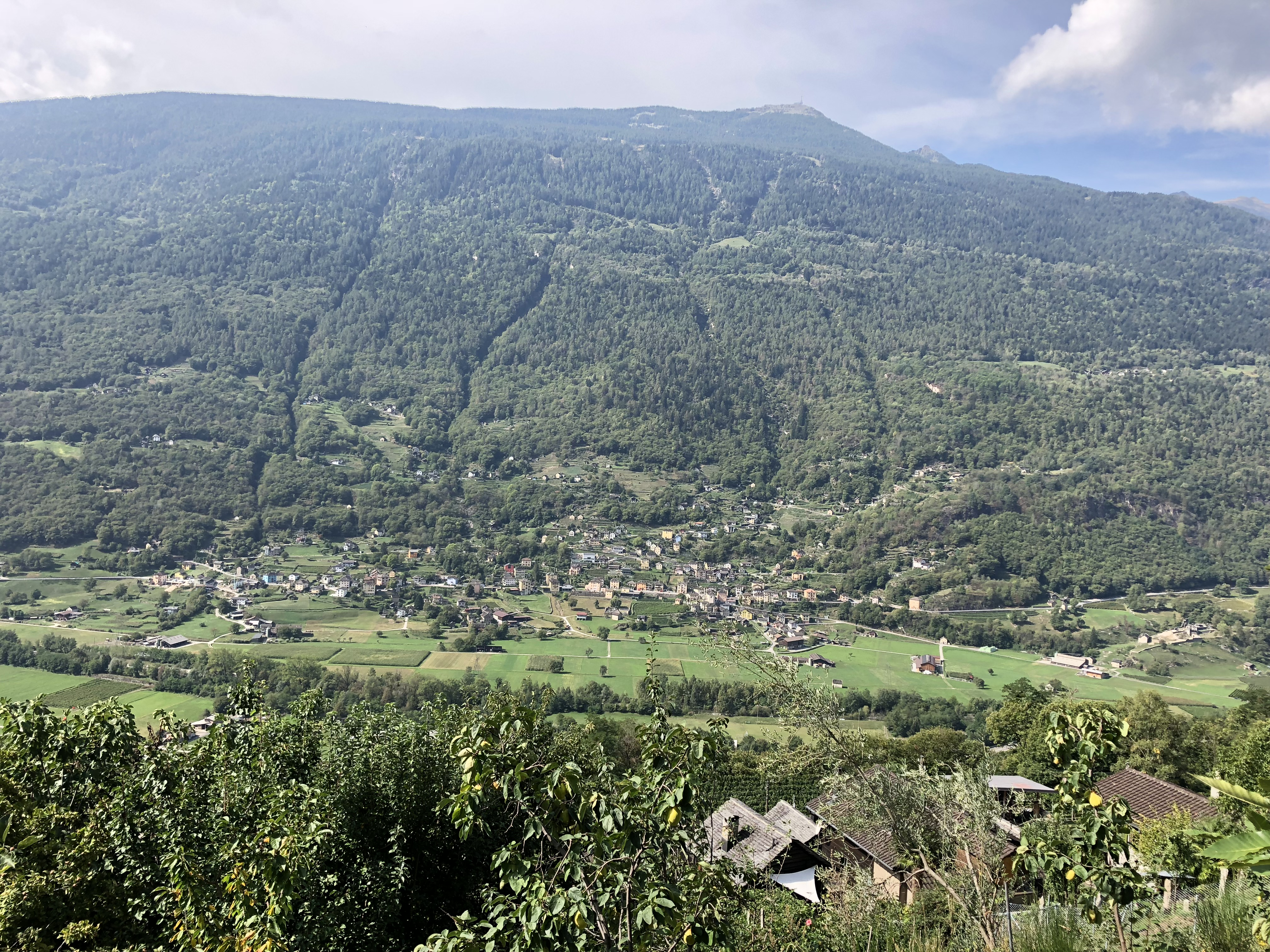

- Flag Coat of arms
- Location of Semione
- Location within Switzerland Location within Canton of Ticino
- Coordinates: 46°24′N 8°58′E
- Country: Switzerland
- Canton: Ticino
- District: Blenio

Area
  - Total: 10.5 km^{2} (4.1 sq mi)
- Elevation: 389 m (1,276 ft)

Population (December 2004)
  - Total: 335
  - Density: 31.9/km^{2} (82.6/sq mi)
- Time zone: UTC+01:00 (CET)
  - Summer (DST): UTC+02:00 (CEST)
- Postal code: 6714
- SFOS number: 5046
- ISO 3166 code: CH-TI
- Surrounded by: Biasca, Bodio, Ludiano, Malvaglia, Pollegio, Sobrio
- Website: SFSO statistics

Semione is a former municipality in the district of Blenio in the canton of Ticino in Switzerland. Since 15 March 2011, it is part of the municipality Serravalle.

== Geography ==
Aerial view (1953)

Semione has an area, as of 1997, of 10.42 square kilometers (4.02 sq mi). Of this area, 1.06 km^{2} (0.41 sq mi) or 10.2% is used for agricultural purposes, while 8.16 km^{2} (3.15 sq mi) or 78.3% is forested. Of the rest of the land, 0.36 km^{2} (0.14 sq mi) or 3.5% is settled (buildings or roads), 0.05 km^{2} (12 acres) or 0.5% is either rivers or lakes and 0.25 km^{2} (0.097 sq mi) or 2.4% is unproductive land.

Of the built up area, housing and buildings made up 2.3% and transportation infrastructure made up 1.0%. Out of the forested land, 75.0% of the total land area is heavily forested and 3.3% is covered with orchards or small clusters of trees. Of the agricultural land, 6.7% is used for growing crops, while 1.2% is used for orchards or vine crops and 2.3% is used for alpine pastures. All the water in the municipality is flowing water. Of the unproductive areas, and 1.4% is too rocky for vegetation.

The municipalities of Ludiano, Malvaglia and Semione merged on 15 March 2011 into the new municipality Serravalle.

== Coat of arms ==
The blazon of the municipal coat of arms is Bendy of six gules and argent overall on a fess or three fleurs-de- lis azure.

== Demographics ==
Semione has a population (as of December 2020) of 332. As of 2008, 3.1% of the population are foreign nationals. Over the last 10 years (1997–2007) the population has changed at a rate of 9.2%.

Most of the population (as of 2000) speaks Italian (85.6%), with German being second most common (10.6%) and French being third (2.2%). Of the Swiss national languages (as of 2000), 34 speak German, 7 people speak French, 274 people speak Italian. The remainder (5 people) speak another language.

As of 2008, the gender distribution of the population was 53.2% male and 46.8% female. The population was made up of 183 Swiss men (51.5% of the population), and 6 (1.7%) non-Swiss men. There were 159 Swiss women (44.8%), and 7 (2.0%) non-Swiss women.

In 2008 there were 3 live births to Swiss citizens and births to non-Swiss citizens, and in same time span there were 4 deaths of Swiss citizens. Ignoring immigration and emigration, the population of Swiss citizens decreased by 1 while the foreign population remained the same. There were 2 Swiss men who immigrated back to Switzerland. At the same time, there . The total Swiss population change in 2008 (from all sources) was a decrease of 2 and the non-Swiss population change was a decrease of 2 people. This represents a population growth rate of -1.1%.

The age distribution, as of 2009, in Semione is; 33 children or 9.3% of the population are between 0 and 9 years old and 24 teenagers or 6.8% are between 10 and 19. Of the adult population, 38 people or 10.7% of the population are between 20 and 29 years old. 40 people or 11.3% are between 30 and 39, 51 people or 14.4% are between 40 and 49, and 50 people or 14.1% are between 50 and 59. The senior population distribution is 59 people or 16.6% of the population are between 60 and 69 years old, 37 people or 10.4% are between 70 and 79, there are 23 people or 6.5% who are over 80.

As of 2000 the average number of residents per living room was 0.52 which is fewer people per room than the cantonal average of 0.6 per room. In this case, a room is defined as space of a housing unit of at least 4 m^{2} (43 sq ft) as normal bedrooms, dining rooms, living rooms, kitchens and habitable cellars and attics. About 63.8% of the total households were owner occupied, or in other words did not pay rent (though they may have a mortgage or a rent-to-own agreement).

As of 2000, there were 151 private households in the municipality, and an average of 2.1 persons per household. In 2000 there were 175 single family homes (or 77.1% of the total) out of a total of 227 inhabited buildings. There were 35 two family buildings (15.4%) and 14 multi-family buildings (6.2%). There were also 3 buildings in the municipality that were multipurpose buildings (used for both housing and commercial or another purpose).

The vacancy rate for the municipality, in 2008, was 0%. In 2000 there were 292 apartments in the municipality. The most common apartment size was the 3 room apartment of which there were 84. There were 21 single room apartments and 73 apartments with five or more rooms. Of these apartments, a total of 149 apartments (51.0% of the total) were permanently occupied, while 138 apartments (47.3%) were seasonally occupied and 5 apartments (1.7%) were empty. As of 2007, the construction rate of new housing units was 2.8 new units per 1000 residents.

The historical population is given in the following table:

year	population
1850	755
1860	622
1870	879
1880	595
1890	632
1900	472
1950	349
1970	268
1990	281
2000	320

== Heritage sites of national significance ==
The Parish Church of S. Maria Assunta with Ossuary, the Oratory of S. Maria Bambina a Navone and the Rovine del castello di Serravalle are listed as Swiss heritage sites of national significance. The entire villages of Semione and Navone were listed on the Inventory of Swiss Heritage Sites.

== Politics ==
In the 2007 federal election the most popular party was the SP which received 27.49% of the vote. The next three most popular parties were the Ticino League (20.02%), the FDP (19.81%) and the CVP (16.02%). In the federal election, a total of 122 votes were cast, and the voter turnout was 41.9%.

In the 2007 Gran Consiglio election, there were a total of 290 registered voters in Semione, of which 161 or 55.5% voted. 2 blank ballots were cast, leaving 159 valid ballots in the election. The most popular party was the SSI which received 40 or 25.2% of the vote. The next three most popular parties were; the PS (with 36 or 22.6%), the PLRT (with 25 or 15.7%) and the PLRT (with 25 or 15.7%).

In the 2007 Consiglio di Stato election, 1 blank ballot was cast, leaving 159 valid ballots in the election. The most popular party was the PS which received 43 or 27.0% of the vote. The next three most popular parties were; the LEGA (with 39 or 24.5%), the SSI (with 31 or 19.5%) and the PLRT (with 23 or 14.5%).

== Economy ==
As of 2007, Semione had an unemployment rate of 1.96%. As of 2005, there were 30 people employed in the primary economic sector and about 12 businesses involved in this sector. 13 people were employed in the secondary sector and there were 4 businesses in this sector. 6 people were employed in the tertiary sector, with 3 businesses in this sector. There were 136 residents of the municipality who were employed in some capacity, of which females made up 32.4% of the workforce.

In 2000, there were 13 workers who commuted into the municipality and 96 workers who commuted away. The municipality is a net exporter of workers, with about 7.4 workers leaving the municipality for every one entering. Of the working population, 4.4% used public transportation to get to work, and 65.4% used a private car.

== Religion ==
From the 2000 census, 249 or 77.8% were Roman Catholic, while 26 or 8.1% belonged to the Swiss Reformed Church. There are 37 individuals (or about 11.56% of the population) who belong to another church (not listed on the census), and 8 individuals (or about 2.50% of the population) did not answer the question.

== Education ==
In Semione about 61.7% of the population (between age 25–64) have completed either non-mandatory upper secondary education or additional higher education (either University or a Fachhochschule).

In Semione there was a total of 44 students (as of 2009). The Ticino education system provides up to three years of non-mandatory kindergarten and in Semione there were 7 children in kindergarten. The primary school program lasts for five years and includes both a standard school and a special school. In the municipality, 14 students attended the standard primary schools and 1 student attended the special school. In the lower secondary school system, students either attend a two-year middle school followed by a two-year pre-apprenticeship or they attend a four-year program to prepare for higher education. There were 11 students in the two-year middle school and 0 in their pre-apprenticeship, while 6 students were in the four-year advanced program.

The upper secondary school includes several options, but at the end of the upper secondary program, a student should be prepared to enter a trade or to continue to a university or college. In Ticino, vocational students may either attend school while working on their internship or apprenticeship (which takes three or four years) or may attend school followed by an internship or apprenticeship (which takes one year as a full-time student or one and a half to two years as a part-time student). There were 0 vocational students who were attending school full-time and 4 who attend part-time.

The professional program lasts three years and prepares a student for a job in engineering, nursing, computer science, business, tourism and similar fields. There was 1 student in the professional program.

As of 2000, there were 30 residents attended schools outside the municipality.
