= Bodio =

- Former municipality
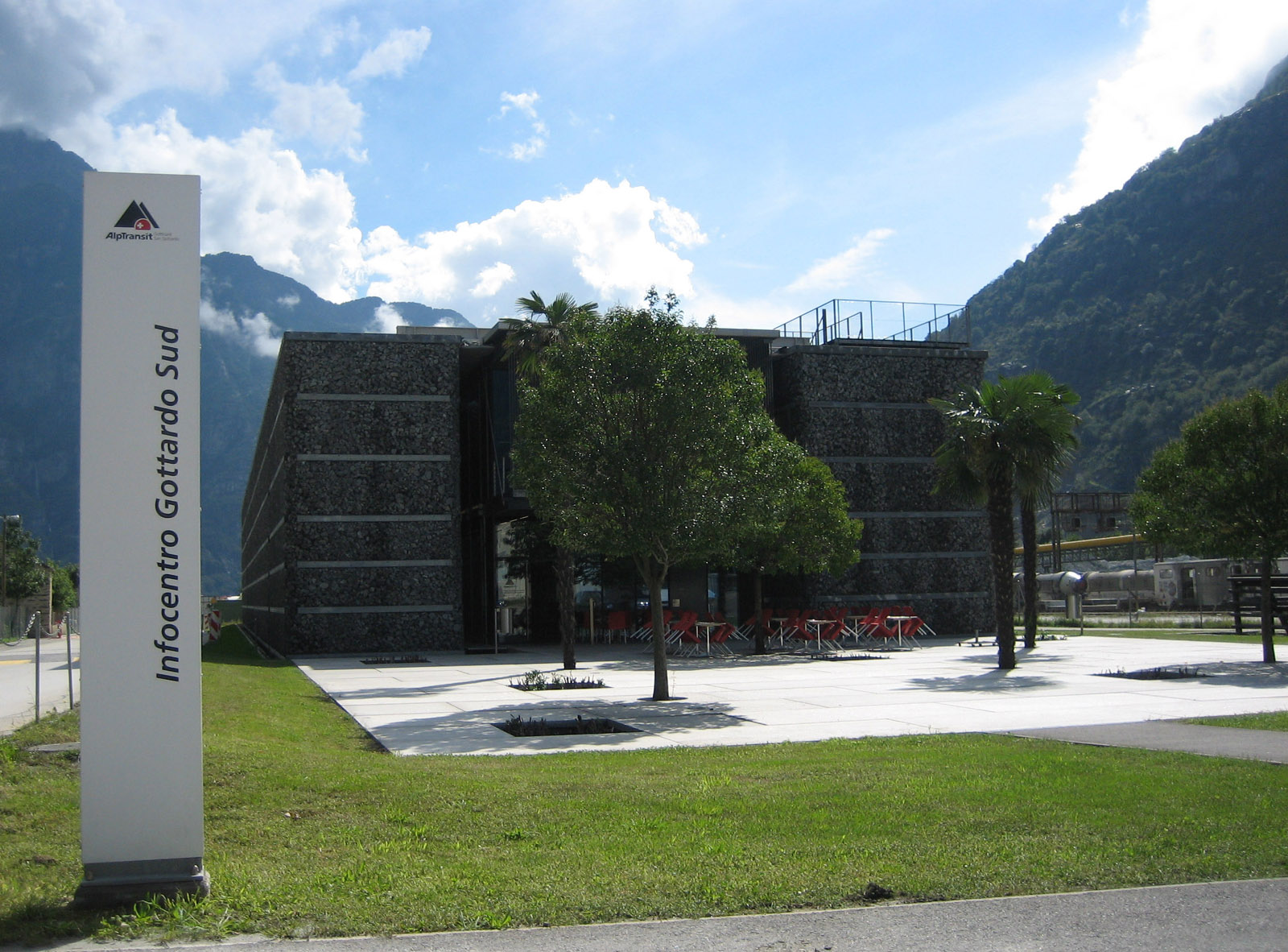
- Visitors center of the Gotthard Base Tunnel in Bodio-Pollegio

- Flag Coat of arms
- Location of Bodio
- Location within Switzerland Location within Canton of Ticino
- Coordinates: 46°23′N 8°55′E
- Country: Switzerland
- Canton: Ticino
- District: Leventina

Government
  - Mayor: Sindaco

Area
  - Total: 6.44 km^{2} (2.49 sq mi)
- Elevation: 321 m (1,053 ft)

Population (December 2004)
  - Total: 1,081
  - Density: 168/km^{2} (435/sq mi)
- Time zone: UTC+01:00 (CET)
  - Summer (DST): UTC+02:00 (CEST)
- Postal code: 6743
- SFOS number: 5064
- ISO 3166 code: CH-TI
- Surrounded by: Giornico, Personico, Pollegio, Semione, Sobrio
- Website: SFSO statistics

Bodio is a former municipality in the district of Leventina in the canton of Ticino in Switzerland. On 6 April 2025, it merged into the municipality of Giornico.

== History ==
Bodio was first mentioned in 1227 as Boidi. During the Middle Ages, Bodio and the now abandoned village of Simbra (or Saimola) formed a Degagna in the Giornico area. During the reign of the cathedral of Milan over the three Ambrosian Valleys, in May and November the placita della Leventina meetings were held in Bodio. The Placita della Leventina, was a meeting of the Leventina valley used to administer justice and to discuss local issues. Until the 16th century the village belonged to the parish of Giornico. It became a separate parish in 1567, and until 1602 Pollegio was part of the parish. The church of S. Stefano was first mentioned in 1227. Along with a large part of the village, it was destroyed by a landslide in the 15th century. The current parish church dates from the 19th century, the bell tower from 1779. The floods of 1817, 1829, 1834 and 1839 caused great damage in the village and a further flood of the Ticino river in 1868 caused 18 fatalities and destroyed some homes.

The town was important for timber transport on the Ticino river. Above Bodio, the logs were allowed to float freely down the river. At Bodio they were collected and rafted. In the so-called Fosso, a collection and delivery basin, the logs were collected and tied together to limit damage to the river embankments downstream.

Many residents emigrated from the municipality seeking work. Until the middle of the 19th century, most of the emigrants went to Italy, with the exception of Glaser and Ofensetzer families, who mostly went to France. In 1876, a fifth of the former population (then 400 inhabitants) lived in the United States, primarily in California and Nevada.

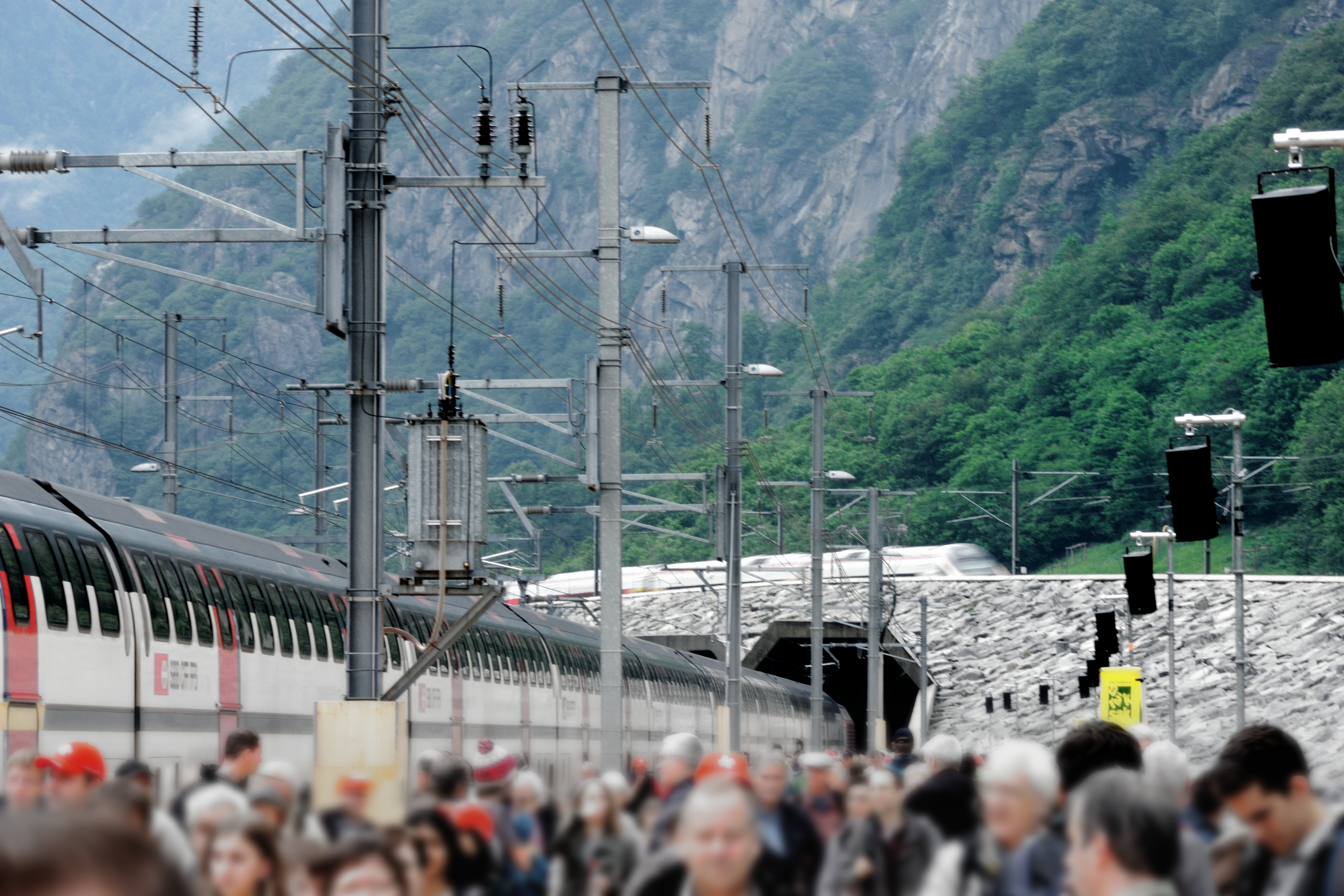
Inauguration of the Gotthard Base Tunnel (south portal)

The transformation of the community from a farming village to an industrial center is due to the construction of the Gotthard railway at the end of the 19th century, and the use of water power from the Ticino river, which began in 1911 with the commissioning of the Biaschina-Zentrale powerplant. The availability of large amounts of energy at a low cost, and the presence of an important transport link (the train) induced various industries to settle in the region. This helped turn the area into an important industrial center of the Canton of Ticino. Around 1910, Swiss and German businesses opened in the community, including Diamant (grinding materials), the Gotthardwerke (metal alloys), the chemical plant Nitre (production of nitrogen derivatives) and two carbide factories. These industrial firms, which employed more than 1,000 workers (including many Italians), flourished thanks to the production of explosive materials during World War I. After the war, the industry declined due to the changes of production methods and high railway tariffs. The first industry to collapse was the granite industry, which employed about 150 people. On 21 July 1921, an explosion at the Nitre chemical plant claimed 15 lives, destroyed the factory and damaged neighboring buildings.

The concentration of industry and labor in the area led to the creation of trade unions. In 1917, Bodio became the home of the first cantonal section of the metal workers union (SMUV). In the 1930s, various vocational education departments opened at schools in the region. In 1917 the Biaschina-Kraftwerk power plant was transferred from Motor AG (later Motor-Columbus) to the Ticino Electricity Works (Ofelti), which was based in Bodio. In 1936, after the construction of the Gotthard-transmission line, the Aare-Tessin AG für Elektrizität company (Atel), was founded and headquartered in Olten, with a branch at Bodio. In 1924, the Gotthardwerke was acquired by Lonza in Basel. The new company, renamed Timcal in 1995, was the world's leading company in the production of synthetic graphite and high temperature lubricants. The best known example of local industrial enterprises is Monteforno (located in the area of Giornico, but based in Bodio). It was founded in 1946 and closed on 31 January 1995.

There are no longer any farms in the municipality, but there are about 4 acres of wine grapes, which produce a Merlot wine of recognized quality.

Aerial view (1954)

== Geography ==
Bodio has an area, as of 1997, of 6.44 square kilometers (2.49 sq mi). Of this area, 0.38 km^{2} (0.15 sq mi) or 5.9% is used for agricultural purposes, while 4.25 km^{2} (1.64 sq mi) or 66.0% is forested. Of the rest of the land, 0.76 km^{2} (0.29 sq mi) or 11.8% is settled (buildings or roads), 0.12 km^{2} (30 acres) or 1.9% is either rivers or lakes and 0.98 km^{2} (0.38 sq mi) or 15.2% is unproductive land.

Of the built up area, industrial buildings made up 2.3% of the total area while housing and buildings made up 3.9% and transportation infrastructure made up 5.1%. Out of the forested land, 59.0% of the total land area is heavily forested and 2.8% is covered with orchards or small clusters of trees. Of the agricultural land, 1.4% is used for growing crops and 3.9% is used for alpine pastures. All the water in the municipality is flowing water. Of the unproductive areas, 6.5% is unproductive vegetation and 8.7% is too rocky for vegetation.

The municipality is located in the Leventina district, at an elevation of 321 m (1,053 ft) on the left side of the lower Leventina valley.

== Coat of arms ==
The blazon of the municipal coat of arms is Per bend sinister Gules a cross Argent and Or a mullet of the first.

== Demographics ==
Bodio has a population (as of December 2020) of 937. As of 2008, 43.3% of the population are resident foreign nationals. Over the last 10 years (1997–2007) the population has changed at a rate of -12.7%.

Most of the population (as of 2000) speaks Italian (87.1%), with Serbo-Croatian being second most common ( 3.4%) and Portuguese being third ( 2.5%). Of the Swiss national languages (as of 2000), 13 speak German, 8 people speak French, 921 people speak Italian. The remainder (116 people) speak another language.

As of 2008, the gender distribution of the population was 50.7% male and 49.3% female. The population was made up of 261 Swiss men (26.7% of the population), and 235 (24.0%) non-Swiss men. There were 304 Swiss women (31.1%), and 178 (18.2%) non-Swiss women.

In 2008 there were 4 live births to Swiss citizens and 3 births to non-Swiss citizens, and in same time span there were 8 deaths of Swiss citizens and 4 non-Swiss citizen deaths. Ignoring immigration and emigration, the population of Swiss citizens decreased by 4 while the foreign population decreased by 1. There was 1 Swiss man who immigrated back to Switzerland and 4 Swiss women who emigrated from Switzerland. At the same time, there were 4 non-Swiss men and 8 non-Swiss women who immigrated from another country to Switzerland. The total Swiss population change in 2008 (from all sources) was a decrease of 22 and the non-Swiss population change was a decrease of 4 people. This represents a population growth rate of -2.6%.

The age distribution, as of 2009, in Bodio is; 75 children or 7.7% of the population are between 0 and 9 years old and 90 teenagers or 9.2% are between 10 and 19. Of the adult population, 101 people or 10.3% of the population are between 20 and 29 years old. 131 people or 13.4% are between 30 and 39, 160 people or 16.4% are between 40 and 49, and 146 people or 14.9% are between 50 and 59. The senior population distribution is 126 people or 12.9% of the population are between 60 and 69 years old, 76 people or 7.8% are between 70 and 79, there are 73 people or 7.5% who are over 80.

As of 2000, there were 496 private households in the municipality, and an average of 2.1 persons per household. In 2000 there were 213 single family homes (or 65.7% of the total) out of a total of 324 inhabited buildings. There were 51 two family buildings (15.7%) and 39 multi-family buildings (12.0%). There were also 21 buildings in the municipality that were multipurpose buildings (used for both housing and commercial or another purpose).

The vacancy rate for the municipality, in 2008, was 2.3%. In 2000 there were 642 apartments in the municipality. The most common apartment size was the 3 room apartment of which there were 201. There were 33 single room apartments and 121 apartments with five or more rooms. Of these apartments, a total of 495 apartments (77.1% of the total) were permanently occupied, while 104 apartments (16.2%) were seasonally occupied and 43 apartments (6.7%) were empty. As of 2007, the construction rate of new housing units was 0 new units per 1000 residents.

The historical population is given in the following table:

year	population
1354	32 Hearths
1567	50
1602	201
1745	323
1850	362
1880	420
1900	356
1950	935
1980	1,477
1990	1,154
2000	1,058

== Heritage sites of national significance ==
The Centrale Idroelettrica Della Biaschina (Hydroelectric power plant at Biaschina) is listed as a Swiss heritage site of national significance.

== Politics ==
In the 2007 federal election the most popular party was the CVP which received 46.59% of the vote. The next three most popular parties were the SP (19.27%), the Ticino League (13.84%) and the FDP (11.58%). In the federal election, a total of 259 votes were cast, and the voter turnout was 54.8%.

In the 2007 Gran Consiglio election, there were a total of 521 registered voters in Bodio, of which 331 or 63.5% voted. 4 blank ballots and 1 null ballot were cast, leaving 326 valid ballots in the election. The most popular party was the PPD+GenGiova which received 112 or 34.4% of the vote. The next three most popular parties were; the PS (with 65 or 19.9%), the SSI (with 57 or 17.5%) and the LEGA (with 39 or 12.0%).

In the 2007 Consiglio di Stato election, 3 blank ballots and 1 null ballot were cast, leaving 328 valid ballots in the election. The most popular party was the PPD which received 113 or 34.5% of the vote. The next three most popular parties were; the PS (with 74 or 22.6%), the SSI (with 53 or 16.2%) and the LEGA (with 43 or 13.1%).

== Economy ==
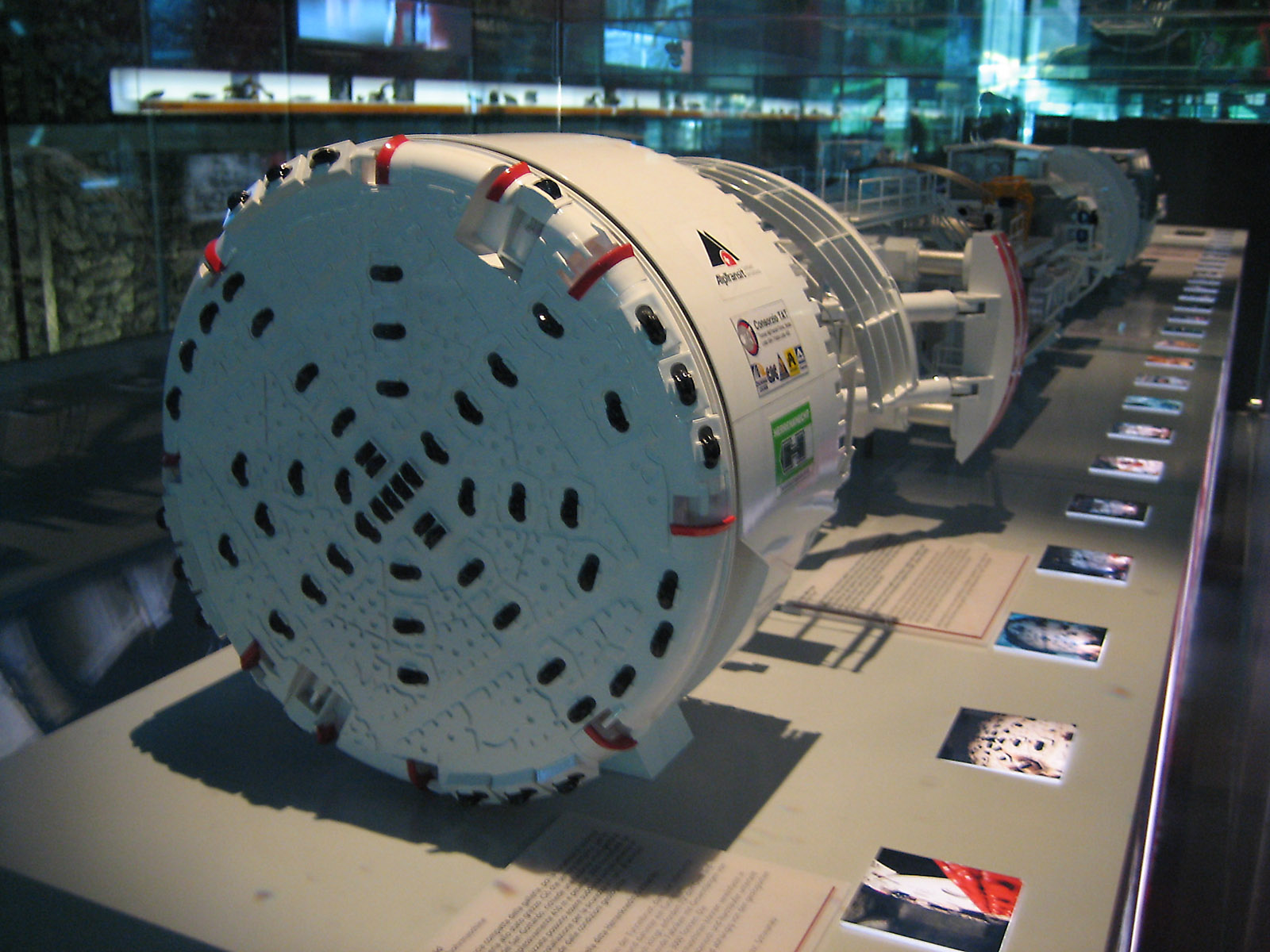
Model of an S-210 tunnel boring machine, being used to bore the Gotthard Base Tunnel near Bodio

As of 2007, Bodio had an unemployment rate of 5.12%. As of 2005, there were 6 people employed in the primary economic sector and about 2 businesses involved in this sector. 256 people were employed in the secondary sector and there were 13 businesses in this sector. 119 people were employed in the tertiary sector, with 36 businesses in this sector. There were 462 residents of the municipality who were employed in some capacity, of which females made up 34.6% of the workforce.

In 2000, there were 331 workers who commuted into the municipality and 285 workers who commuted away. The municipality is a net importer of workers, with about 1.2 workers entering the municipality for every one leaving. Of the working population, 9.1% used public transportation to get to work, and 60.8% used a private car.

As of 2009, there were 3 hotels in Bodio with a total of 48 rooms and 87 beds.

== Religion ==
From the 2000 census, 845 or 79.9% were Roman Catholic, while 17 or 1.6% belonged to the Swiss Reformed Church. There are 135 individuals (or about 12.76% of the population) who belong to another church (not listed on the census), and 61 individuals (or about 5.77% of the population) did not answer the question.

== Education ==
The entire Swiss population is generally well educated. In Bodio about 49.5% of the population (between age 25–64) have completed either non-mandatory upper secondary education or additional higher education (either university or a Fachhochschule).

In Bodio there were a total of 148 students (as of 2009). The Ticino education system provides up to three years of non-mandatory kindergarten and in Bodio there were 26 children in kindergarten. The primary school program lasts for five years and includes both a standard school and a special school. In the municipality, 48 students attended the standard primary schools and 5 students attended the special school. In the lower secondary school system, students either attend a two-year middle school followed by a two-year pre-apprenticeship or they attend a four-year program to prepare for higher education. There were 30 students in the two-year middle school and 3 in their pre-apprenticeship, while 5 students were in the four-year advanced program.

The upper secondary school includes several options, but at the end of the upper secondary program, a student will be prepared to enter a trade or to continue on to a university or college. In Ticino, vocational students may either attend school while working on their internship or apprenticeship (which takes three or four years) or may attend school followed by an internship or apprenticeship (which takes one year as a full-time student or one and a half to two years as a part-time student). There were 12 vocational students who were attending school full-time and 17 who attend part-time.

The professional program lasts three years and prepares a student for a job in engineering, nursing, computer science, business, tourism and similar fields. There were 2 students in the professional program.

As of 2000, there were 4 students in Bodio who came from another municipality, while 74 residents attended schools outside the municipality.

== Transport ==
Bodio is served by the infrequently served Bodio station, situated within the municipality. The station is on the Gotthard railway.
