= Biasca =

- Municipality
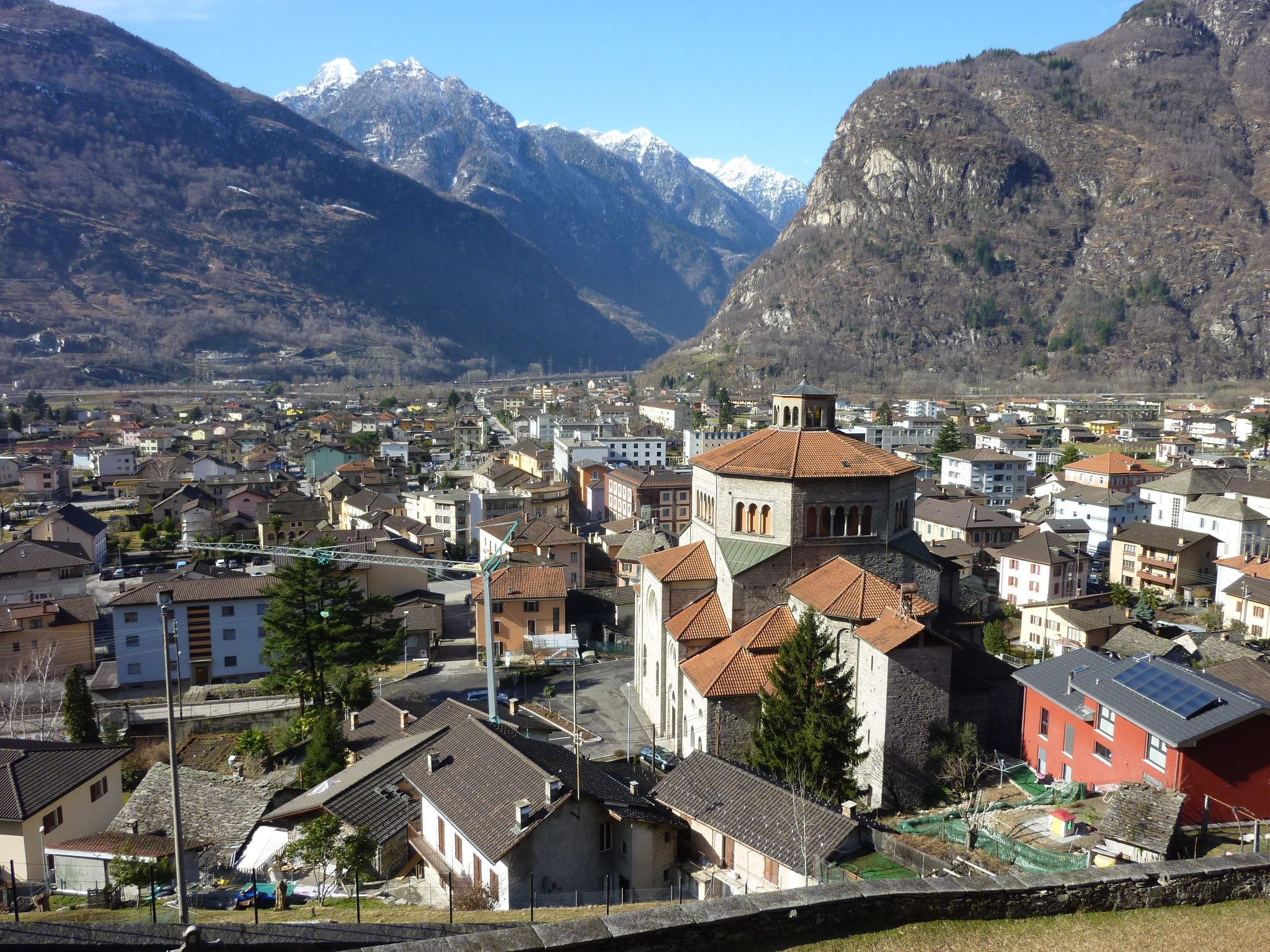
- View of Biasca and the surrounding valley

- Flag Coat of arms
- Location of Biasca
- Location within Switzerland Location within Canton of Ticino
- Coordinates: 46°21′N 8°58′E
- Country: Switzerland
- Canton: Ticino
- District: Riviera

Government
  - Mayor: Sindaco Loris Galbusera

Area
  - Total: 59.13 km^{2} (22.83 sq mi)
- Elevation: 301 m (988 ft)

Population (December 2004)
  - Total: 5,935
  - Density: 100.4/km^{2} (260.0/sq mi)
- Time zone: UTC+01:00 (CET)
  - Summer (DST): UTC+02:00 (CEST)
- Postal code: 6710
- SFOS number: 5281
- ISO 3166 code: CH-TI
- Localities: Biborgo, Cava, Fontana, Loderio, Mazzorino, Pontirone, Pontironetto (S.Anna), Sciresa, Sulgone
- Surrounded by: Cauco (GR), Iragna, Lodrino, Malvaglia, Osogna, Personico, Pollegio, Rossa (GR), Semione
- Website: biasca.ch

Biasca is a town of the district of Riviera in the canton of Ticino in Switzerland.

== History ==
Biasca is first mentioned in 830 as Aviasca in the Liber viventium of Pfäfers Abbey. In 1119 it was mentioned as Abiasca.

=== Early history ===
In 948, the Bishop of Vercelli donated the area around Biasca to the Bishop of Milan. This led to the spiritual and secular domination of the valley north of Bellinzona. During the Bishop's conflicts with the Holy Roman Empire over the Lombardy provinces, Biasca and the surrounding region suffered from armies marching through the valley.

A branch of the Orelli family of Locarno was given the castle above Biasca, near the chapel of S. Petronilla, in the 12th century. They were also given the rights of high justice over the village. However, in 1292 the village was able to push through an agreement that allowed them to elect some local leaders, giving them limited self-government. The Orelli family ruled until the middle of the 14th century, when their territory was incorporated into the dominion of the Visconti. They granted the village along with the Blenio valley to the Bolognese Pepoli family. In the second half of the 14th century, Biasca as was granted the right to choose the Console who had the right to call courts. This right was confirmed in 1422 and subsequent years. In 1403, after the death of Gian Galeazzo, the Visconti Duke, Biasca was conquered by the two Swiss cantons of Uri and Obwalden and incorporated into the Italian bailiwicks of the two towns. In 1422 the Visconti troops of Milan attacked and at the Battle of Arbedo defeated the Swiss and reestablished Milan's borders.

=== Under the Swiss Confederation ===
In 1439, the town was attacked by Uri once again. The Duke of Milan reinforced Biasca and in 1441 made it a bulwark against the Leventina valley which had been conquered by Uri. It was again attacked and occupied by Uri in 1449. The town reached an agreement in 1450 with the new Duke of Milan, Francesco Sforza, which confirmed the previously extended rights. Other raids took place after the death of Francesco Sforza in 1466 and during the campaign of 1478. It was probably annexed in 1495 along with the rest of the Blenio valley by the Swiss. After 1500 it was part of the Bailiwick of Riviera.

In 1512, a landslide from Monte Crenone created a dam across the Brenno river north of the village. The dam created a 14 kilometers (8.7 mi) long lake above the village, until 1515 when the dam burst causing heavy damage. Due to its location on a major Alpine road traffic, the local economy gradually recovered from this disaster. However, at the end of the 16th and at the beginning of the 17th century, at least three major plague epidemics hit the town. After repeated searches, Charles Borromeo chose Biasca as the center to spread the reforms of the Council of Trent to the Tre Valli region.

Located at the entrance to the Alpine valleys, Biasca as has always played an important role in regional and trans-Alpine trade, even after the Gotthard route opened in the early 13th century. The Orelli family collected tolls on the roads after 1352. In the following years, the existence of a Sust or transshipment warehouse for the transit of goods is mentioned in Biasca. Starting in 1434, the municipality collected a fee, known as forletto on the transport of goods over the passes. In addition to transportation, the main income sources were, forestry, agriculture in the valleys and livestock which spent their summers in alpine pastures and migrated in the winter to the valley.

=== Early Modern Biasca ===
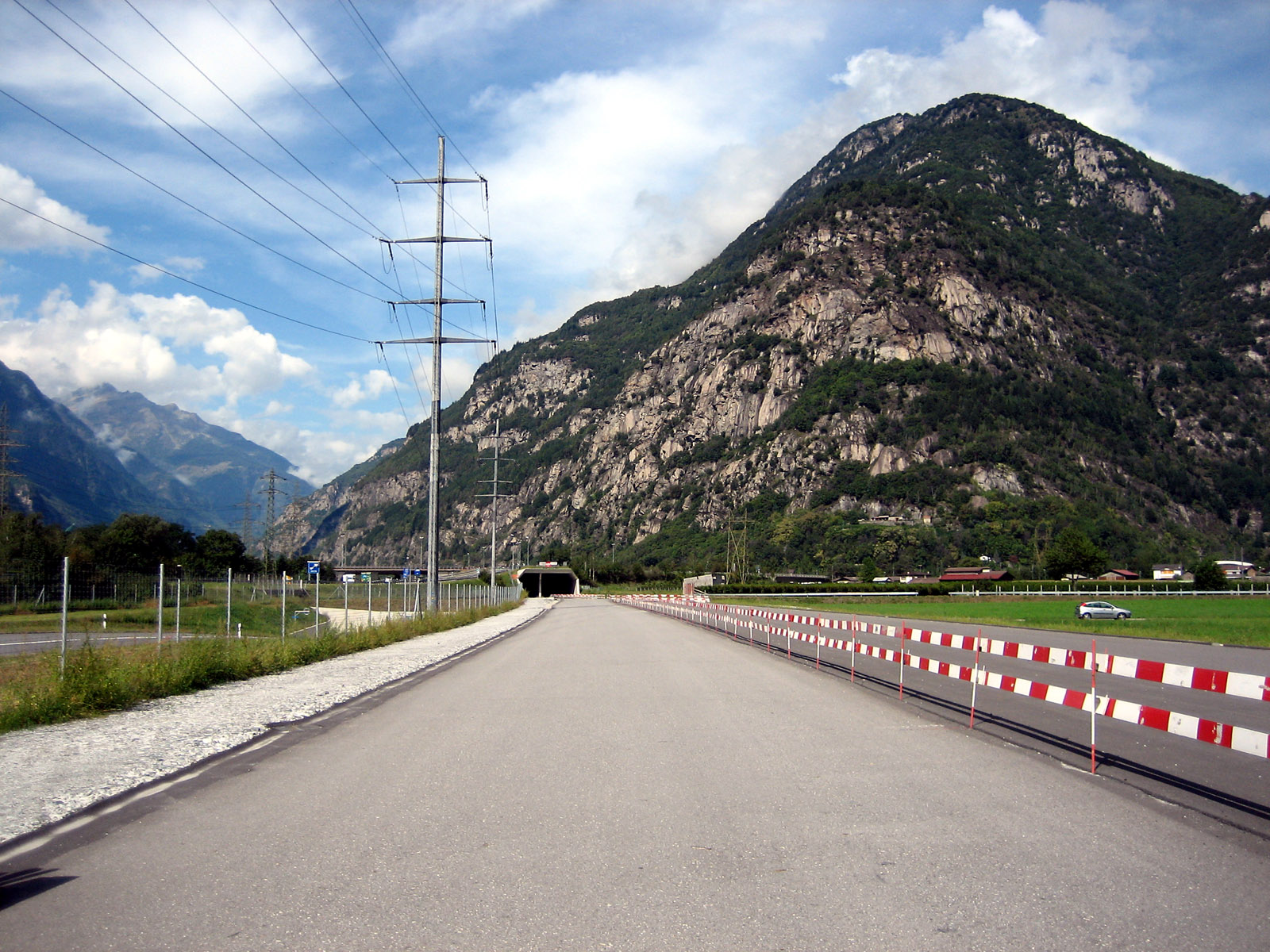
The trackbed for the rail route through the new Gotthard Base Tunnel near Biasca

The construction of the road network in 1815 and the construction of the Gotthard tunnel led to an economic and demographic change in Biasca as it lost its rural character. A feature of the history of Biasca from the middle of the 19th century into the early 20th century is the large number of atheists living in the town as well as a number of anti-clerical acts. In 1980, it became the town in Switzerland with the highest proportion of non-religious. The cause of this phenomenon is probably the influence of immigrants and the railway workers in the 19th century.

For a few decades, the silkworm industry flourished in Biasca. Also, the granite mining industry is important to the whole region, and it reached its peak in Biasca in 1900. In the wake of industrialization, the first economic class battles in Ticino broke out in Biasca. There remains a strong Socialist Party core in the town.

=== Modern Biasca ===
In the postwar years, Biasca's economy grew strongly, especially the industrial sector (in 1990, 43% of the economically active population) and the service sector (56%). Agriculture lost almost all importance in the area and now only provides about 1% of jobs. Most of the development has occurred around the Biasca industrial zone, which is the only one in the canton that is considered "of Cantonal importance". The services sector has grown as Biasca has become a hub for the entire Tre Valli region. The addition of Biasca on the trans-alpine rail link (NEAT) is expected to encourage it to continue its growth.

=== Churches of Biasca ===
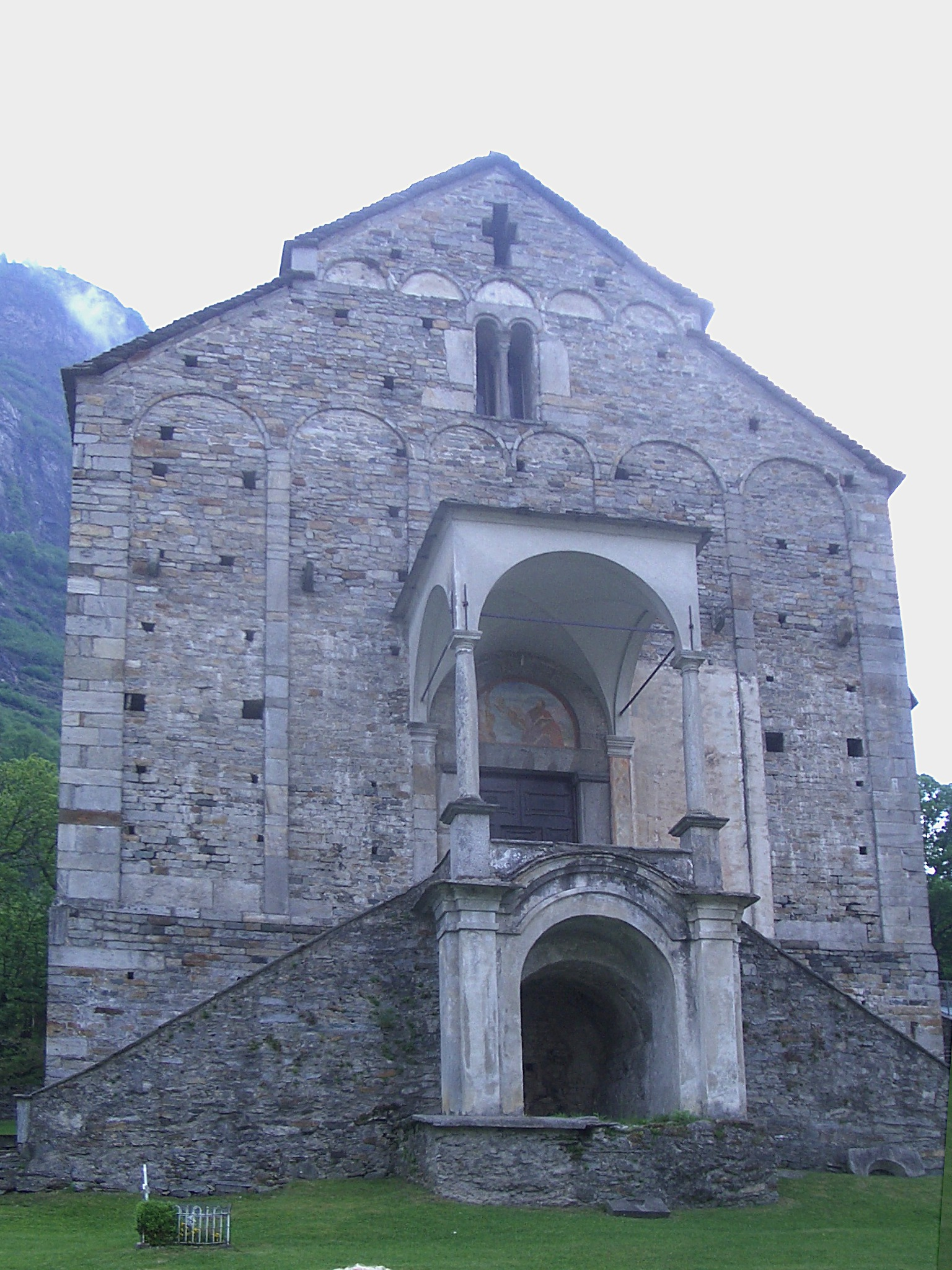
Church of Pietro e Paolo

The parish church of San Pietro dates back to the migration period following the collapse of the Western Roman Empire. It is the oldest Ambrosian Rite church in the region that came to be known as Ambrosian Valleys, which included the Levantine and Blenio valleys and the villages of the Riviera village down to Gnosca and Claro. It was the center of a parish at Biasca. However, it appears that the Church of San Martino in Olivone formed another independent parish, at least until the mid-12th century. The Church of San Pietro was probably built in the 11th century. It became a collegiate church with a dean and canons. The collegiate chapter's statutes originate in 1398. It possessed the right to collect tithes in the Riviera and Levantine valleys. The Church of SS Giacomo e Filippo was finished in 1468 the village, but was destroyed, along with other religious and secular buildings, during the wars of the early 16th century. A Catholic church, the Rotonda di San Carlo, is a magnificent example of the modern architecture of the Milanese architect Macciacchini.

== Geography ==
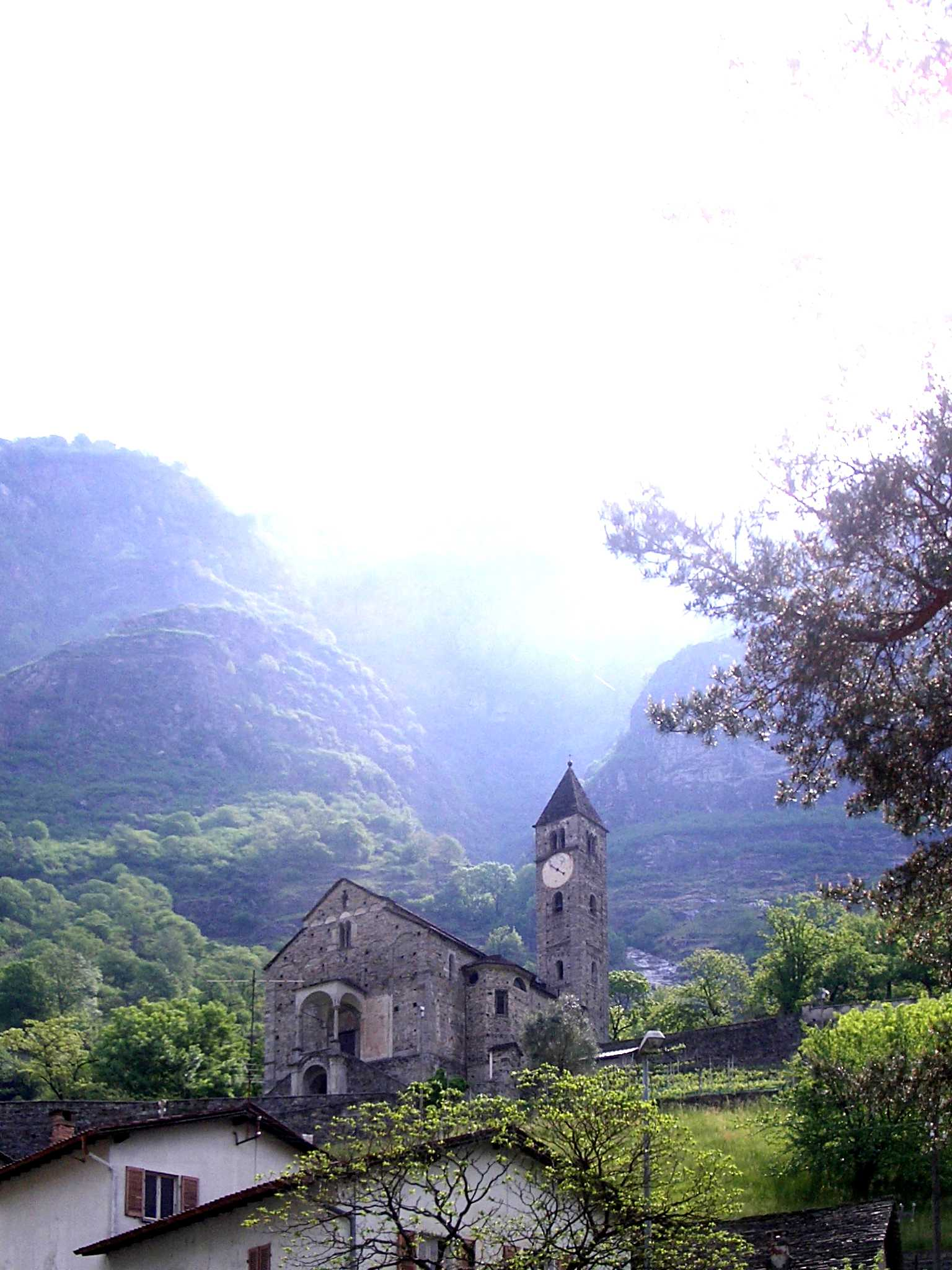
St. Peter and Paul church

Aerial view from 1110 m by Walter Mittelholzer (1931)

Biasca has an area, as of 1997, of 59.13 square kilometers (22.83 sq mi). Of this area, 2.86 km^{2} (1.10 sq mi) or 4.8% is used for agricultural purposes, while 26.6 km^{2} (10.3 sq mi) or 45.0% is forested. Of the rest of the land, 2.92 km^{2} (1.13 sq mi) or 4.9% is settled (buildings or roads), 1.19 km^{2} (0.46 sq mi) or 2.0% is either rivers or lakes and 21.7 km^{2} (8.4 sq mi) or 36.7% is unproductive land.

Of the built up area, housing and buildings made up 1.9% and transportation infrastructure made up 1.8%. Out of the forested land, 35.2% of the total land area is heavily forested and 3.7% is covered with orchards or small clusters of trees. Of the agricultural land, 2.4% is used for growing crops and 1.9% is used for alpine pastures. All the water in the municipality is flowing water. Of the unproductive areas, 13.7% is unproductive vegetation and 23.0% is too rocky for vegetation.

The municipality is located in the Riviera district, between the Leventina, Blenio and Riviera valleys. It is the most important community in the so-called Ambrosian Valleys. The Ambrosian Valleys were several alpine valleys that were traditionally a center of Ambrosian Rite churches. It is 19 km (12 mi) north of Bellinzona, on the banks of the Brenno. About 3 km (1.9 mi) east of Biasca is the small lake of Carigiolo, from which a stream with an 80 m (260 ft) waterfall flows. The villages of Loderio, Ponte, Pontirone, Sant'Anna, and Valle belong to the municipality.

== Coat of arms ==
The blazon of the municipal coat of arms is Per pale argent a serpent erect azure and or an eagle displayed sable langued beaked and membered gules and overall in a chief gules two keys argent in saltire tied with a ribbon also argent.

== Demographics ==
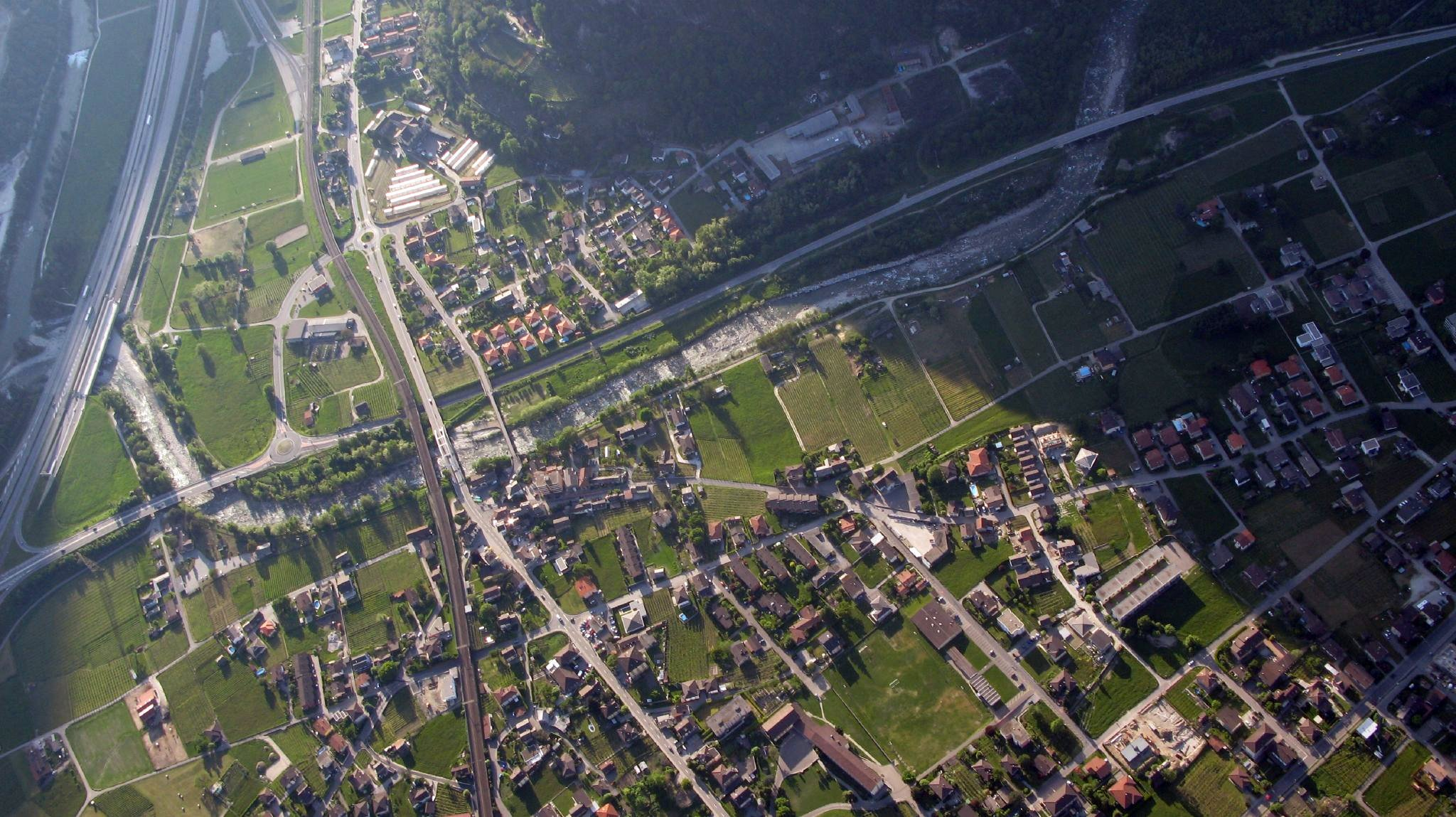
Biasca from the air

Biasca has a population (as of December 2020) of 6,094. As of 2008, 35.6% of the population are resident foreign nationals. Over the last 10 years (1997–2007) the population has changed at a rate of -1.2%. Most of the population (as of 2000) speaks Italian (5,026 or 86.7%), with Albanian being second most common (205 or 3.5%) and Serbo-Croatian being third (194 or 3.3%). There are 45 people who speak French and 7 people who speak Romansh.

As of 2008, the gender distribution of the population was 49.7% male and 50.3% female. The population was made up of 1,821 Swiss men (30.6% of the population), and 1,137 (19.1%) non-Swiss men. There were 2,019 Swiss women (33.9%), and 978 (16.4%) non-Swiss women. Of the population in the municipality 2,330 or about 40.2% were born in Biasca and lived there in 2000. There were 1,098 or 18.9% who were born in the same canton, while 286 or 4.9% were born somewhere else in Switzerland, and 1,979 or 34.2% were born outside of Switzerland.

In 2008 there were 30 live births to Swiss citizens and 22 births to non-Swiss citizens, and in same time span there were 50 deaths of Swiss citizens and 8 non-Swiss citizen deaths. Ignoring immigration and emigration, the population of Swiss citizens decreased by 20 while the foreign population increased by 14. There was 1 Swiss man and 2 Swiss women who immigrated back to Switzerland. At the same time, there were 27 non-Swiss men and 18 non-Swiss women who immigrated from another country to Switzerland. The total Swiss population change in 2008 (from all sources, including moves across municipal borders) was an increase of 69 and the non-Swiss population change was a decrease of 39 people. This represents a population growth rate of 0.5%.

The age distribution, as of 2009, in Biasca is; 554 children or 9.3% of the population are between 0 and 9 years old and 615 teenagers or 10.3% are between 10 and 19. Of the adult population, 712 people or 12.0% of the population are between 20 and 29 years old. 738 people or 12.4% are between 30 and 39, 950 people or 16.0% are between 40 and 49, and 795 people or 13.4% are between 50 and 59. The senior population distribution is 745 people or 12.5% of the population are between 60 and 69 years old, 530 people or 8.9% are between 70 and 79, there are 316 people or 5.3% who are over 80.

As of 2000, there were 2,277 people who were single and never married in the municipality. There were 2,900 married individuals, 388 widows or widowers and 230 individuals who are divorced.

As of 2000, there were 2,369 private households in the municipality, and an average of 2.4 persons per household. There were 727 households that consist of only one person and 134 households with five or more people. Out of a total of 2,371 households that answered this question, 30.7% were households made up of just one person and 47 were adults who lived with their parents. Of the rest of the households, there are 522 married couples without children, 902 married couples with children. There were 137 single parents with a child or children. There were 34 households that were made up unrelated people and 2 households that were made some sort of institution or another collective housing.

In 2000 there were 967 single family homes (or 67.5% of the total) out of a total of 1,433 inhabited buildings. There were 394 multi-family buildings (27.5%), along with 40 multi-purpose buildings that were mostly used for housing (2.8%) and 32 other use buildings (commercial or industrial) that also had some housing (2.2%). Of the single family homes 18 were built before 1919, while 75 were built between 1990 and 2000. The greatest number of single family homes (315) were built between 1946 and 1960.

In 2000 there were 2,883 apartments in the municipality. The most common apartment size was 4 rooms of which there were 1,049. There were 127 single room apartments and 518 apartments with five or more rooms. Of these apartments, a total of 2,364 apartments (82.0% of the total) were permanently occupied, while 381 apartments (13.2%) were seasonally occupied and 138 apartments (4.8%) were empty. As of 2007, the construction rate of new housing units was 5.6 new units per 1000 residents. The vacancy rate for the municipality, in 2008, was 1.35%.

The historical population is given in the following chart:

== Heritage sites of national significance ==
The Arsenale, and the provost's church of SS. Pietro e Paolo are listed as Swiss heritage site of national significance. The town of Biasca and the village of Pontirone are both part of the Inventory of Swiss Heritage Sites.

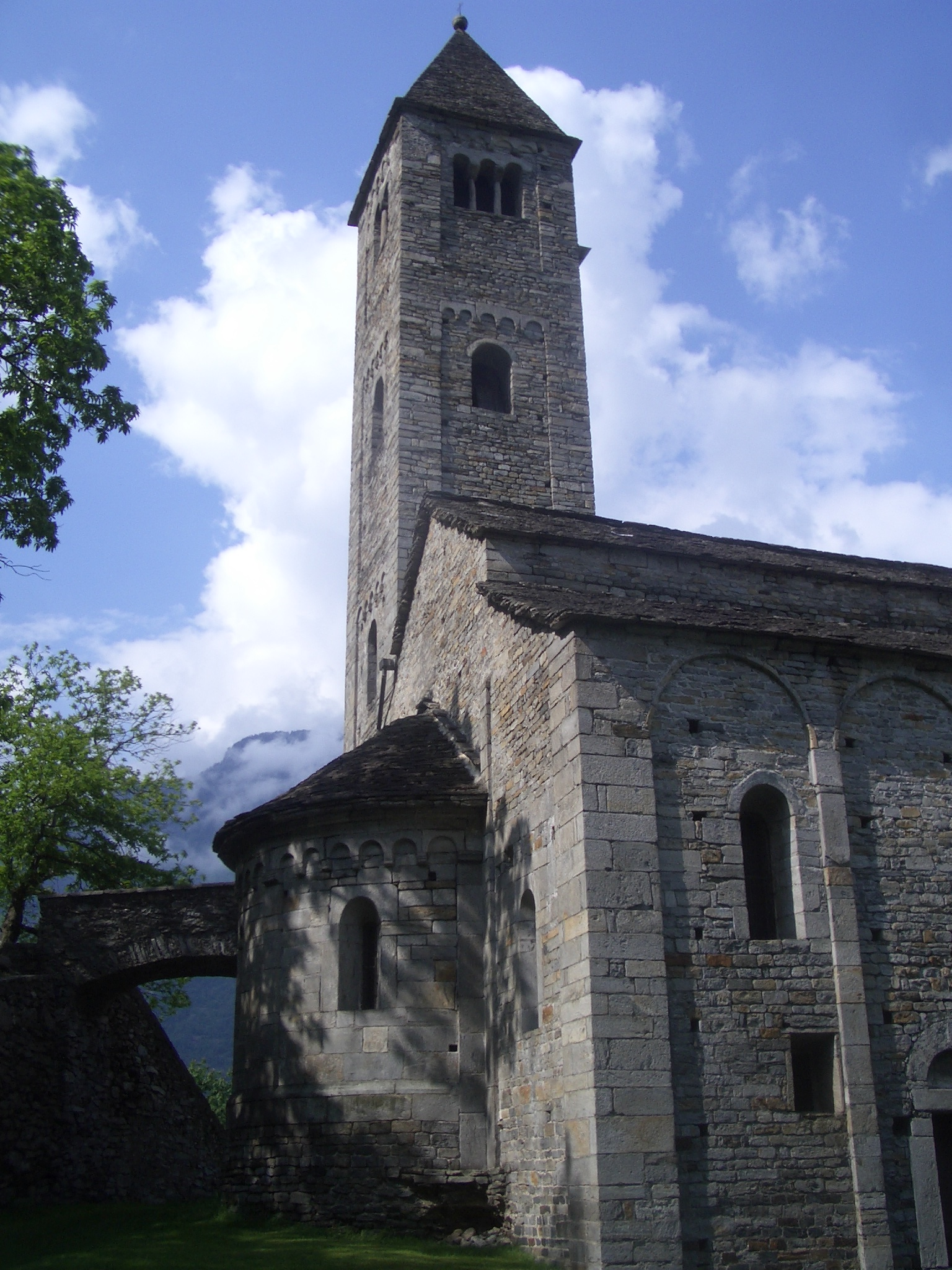
Church of SS. Pietro e Paolo

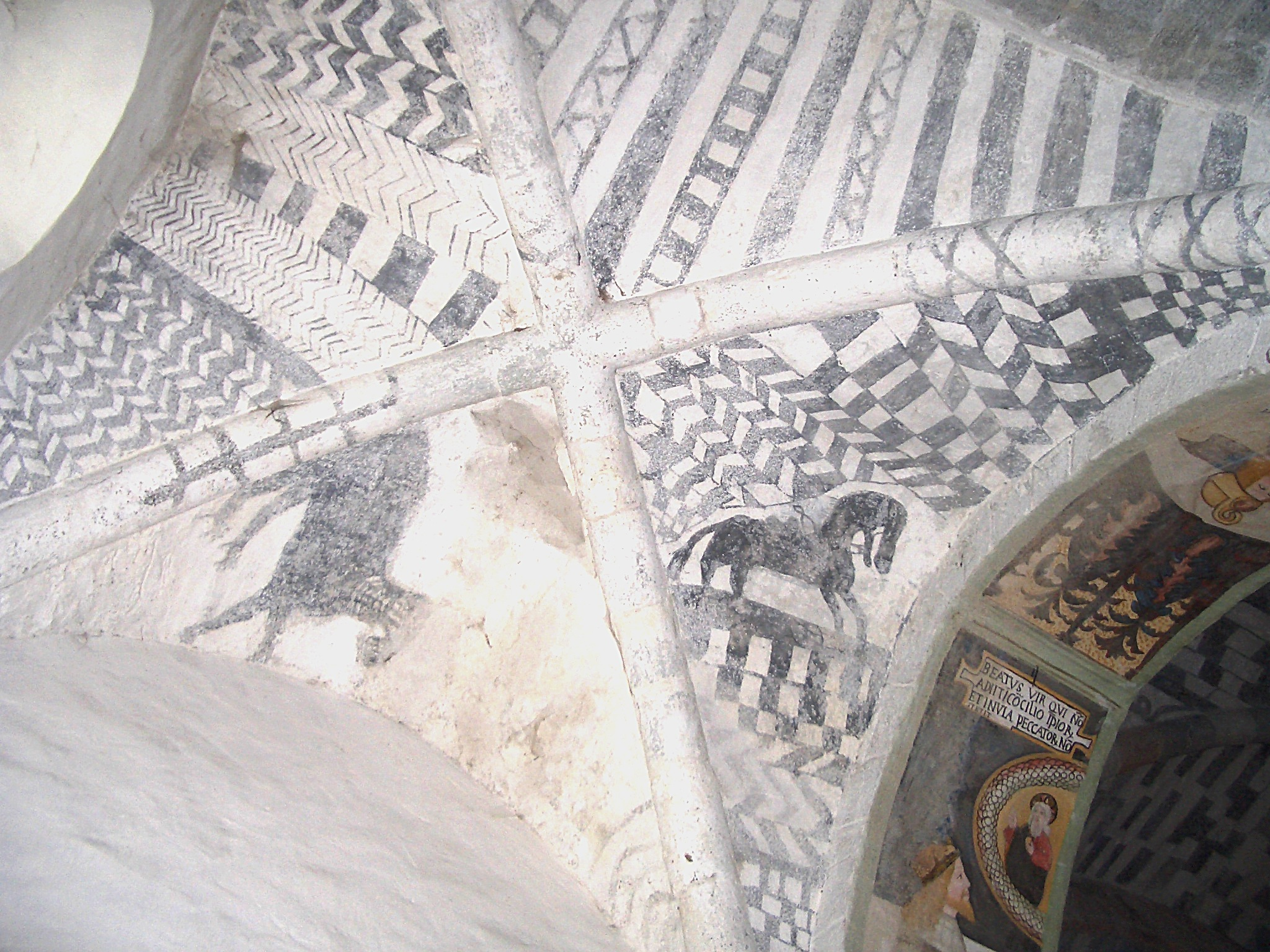
Mural inside the Church of Pietro e Paolo

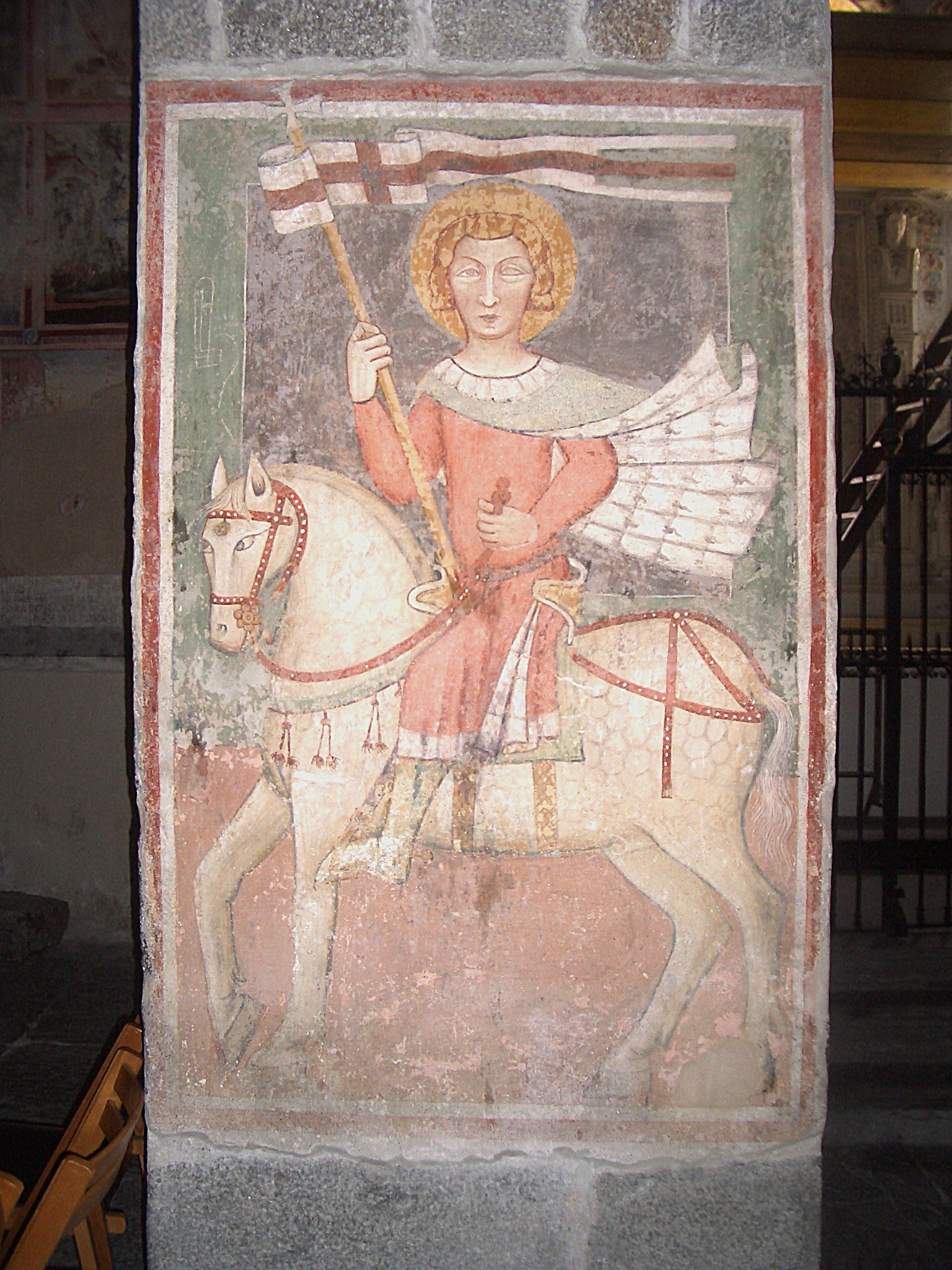
Church of Pietro e Paolo, St Maurice, fresco on a pillar of the church, 15th century

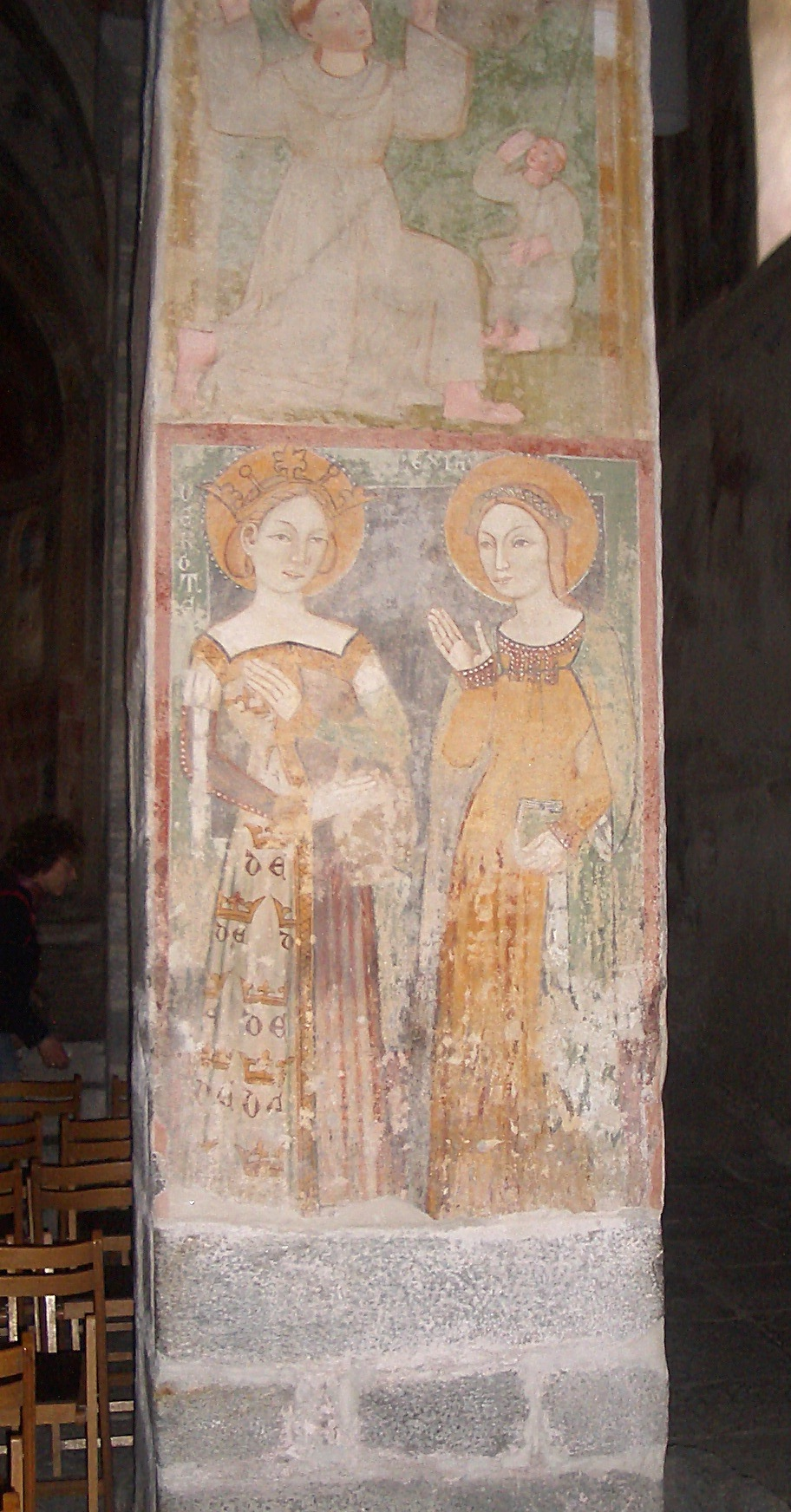
Church of Pietro e Paolo, St. Dorotea and St. Tecla, fresco on a pillar of the church, 15th century

== Politics ==
In the 2007 federal election the most popular party was the FDP which received 34.53% of the vote. The next three most popular parties were the SP (21.72%), the CVP (17.57%) and the Ticino League (17.54%). In the federal election, a total of 1,460 votes were cast, and the voter turnout was 47.2%.

In the 2007 Gran Consiglio election, there were a total of 3,093 registered voters in Biasca, of which 2,029 or 65.6% voted. 39 blank ballots and 3 null ballots were cast, leaving 1,987 valid ballots in the election. The most popular party was the PLRT which received 494 or 24.9% of the vote. The next three most popular parties were; the PS (with 437 or 22.0%), the SSI (with 396 or 19.9%) and the LEGA (with 318 or 16.0%).

In the 2007 Consiglio di Stato election, 22 blank ballots and 4 null ballots were cast, leaving 2,003 valid ballots in the election. The most popular party was the PS which received 495 or 24.7% of the vote. The next three most popular parties were; the PLRT (with 488 or 24.4%), the LEGA (with 439 or 21.9%) and the SSI (with 314 or 15.7%).

== Economy ==
As of 2007, Biasca had an unemployment rate of 4.82%. As of 2005, there were 77 people employed in the primary economic sector and about 37 businesses involved in this sector. 768 people were employed in the secondary sector and there were 72 businesses in this sector. 1,479 people were employed in the tertiary sector, with 237 businesses in this sector. There were 2,464 residents of the municipality who were employed in some capacity, of which females made up 37.7% of the workforce.

In 2008 the total number of full-time equivalent jobs was 2,052. The number of jobs in the primary sector was 34, all of which were in agriculture. The number of jobs in the secondary sector was 675, of which 265 or (39.3%) were in manufacturing, 18 or (2.7%) were in mining and 322 (47.7%) were in construction. The number of jobs in the tertiary sector was 1,343. In the tertiary sector; 432 or 32.2% were in wholesale or retail sales or the repair of motor vehicles, 75 or 5.6% were in the movement and storage of goods, 113 or 8.4% were in a hotel or restaurant, 1 or 0.1% were in the information industry, 58 or 4.3% were the insurance or financial industry, 93 or 6.9% were technical professionals or scientists, 143 or 10.6% were in education and 205 or 15.3% were in health care.

In 2000, there were 1,351 workers who commuted into the municipality and 1,087 workers who commuted away. The municipality is a net importer of workers, with about 1.2 workers entering the municipality for every one leaving. Of the working population, 7.2% used public transportation to get to work, and 61.4% used a private car.

As of 2009, there were 4 hotels in Biasca with a total of 70 rooms and 157 beds.

== Religion ==
From the 2000 census, 4,230 or 73.0% were Roman Catholic.

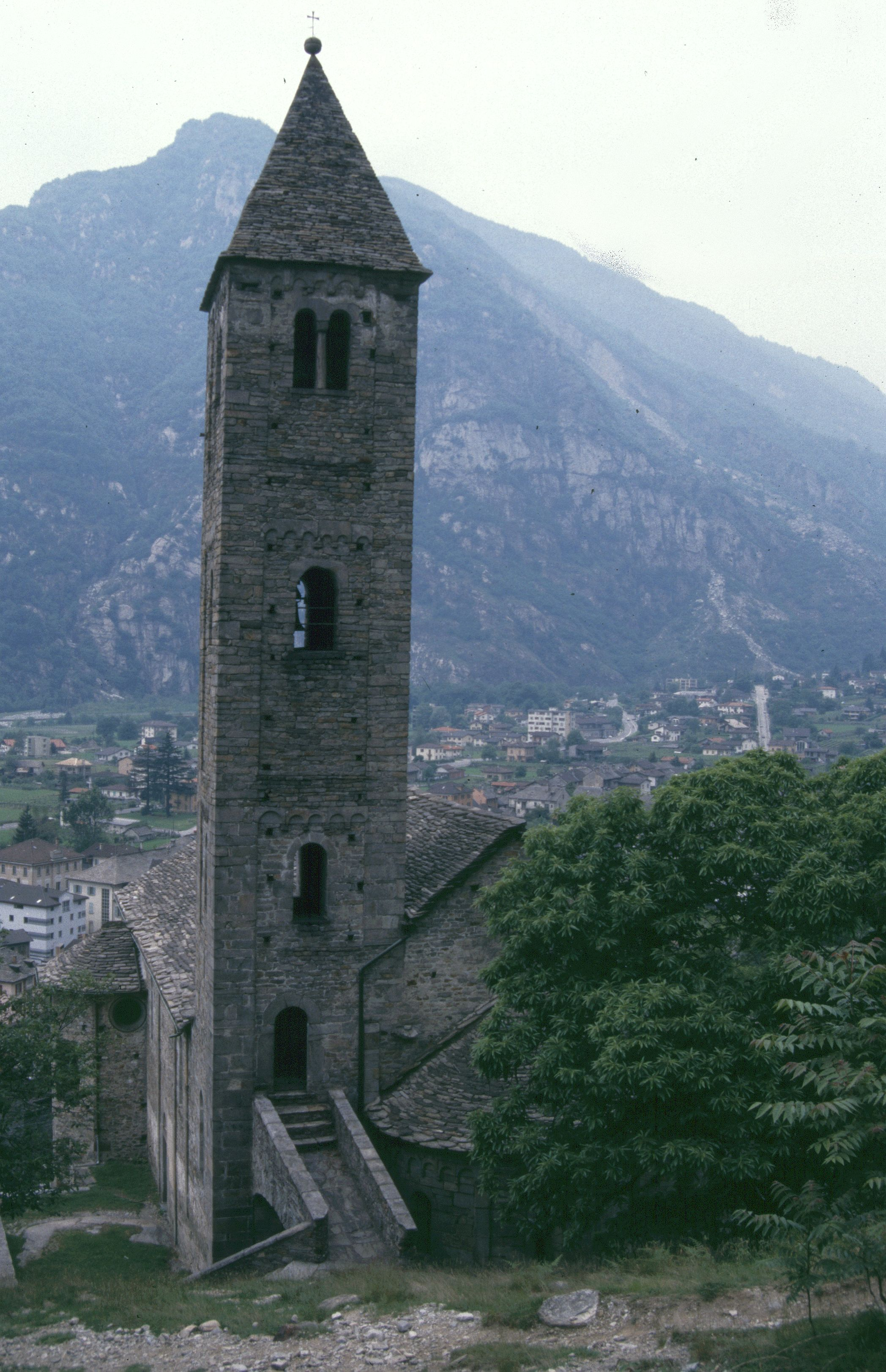
Roman catholic church of St Peter and St Paul. Photo Ziegler175

From this 2000 census 101 or 1.7% belonged to the Swiss Reformed Church. Of the rest of the population, there were 233 members of an Orthodox church (or about 4.02% of the population), there were 2 individuals (or about 0.03% of the population) who belonged to the Christian Catholic Church, and there were 84 individuals (or about 1.45% of the population) who belonged to another Christian church.

There were 5 individuals (or about 0.09% of the population) who were Jewish. In Ticino, the synagogues are in Lugano.

According to this 2000 census, 395 (or about 6.82% of the population) were Islamic. There were 3 individuals who were Buddhist, 1 individual who was Hindu and 2 individuals who belonged to another church. 538 (or about 9.28% of the population) belonged to no church, are agnostic or atheist, and 201 individuals (or about 3.47% of the population) did not answer the question.

== Weather ==
Biasca has an average of 97.3 days of rain or snow per year and on average receives 1,587 mm (62.5 in) of precipitation. The wettest month is May during which time Biasca receives an average of 181 mm (7.1 in) of rain or snow. During this month there is precipitation for an average of 11.4 days. The driest month of the year is December with an average of 65 mm (2.6 in) of precipitation over 5.6 days.

== Education ==
In Biasca about 1,887 or (32.6%) of the population have completed non-mandatory upper secondary education, and 372 or (6.4%) have completed additional higher education (either university or a Fachhochschule). Of the 372 who completed tertiary schooling, 55.6% were Swiss men, 26.6% were Swiss women, 13.4% were non-Swiss men and 4.3% were non-Swiss women.

In Biasca there were a total of 1,015 students (as of 2009). The Ticino education system provides up to three years of non-mandatory kindergarten and in Biasca there were 153 children in kindergarten. The primary school program lasts for five years and includes both a standard school and a special school. In the municipality, 309 students attended the standard primary schools and 8 students attended the special school. In the lower secondary school system, students either attend a two-year middle school followed by a two-year pre-apprenticeship or they attend a four-year program to prepare for higher education. There were 250 students in the two-year middle school and 6 in their pre-apprenticeship, while 94 students were in the four-year advanced program.

The upper secondary school includes several options, but at the end of the upper secondary program, a student will be prepared to enter a trade or to continue on to a university or college. In Ticino, vocational students may either attend school while working on their internship or apprenticeship (which takes three or four years) or may attend school followed by an internship or apprenticeship (which takes one year as a full-time student or one and a half to two years as a part-time student). There were 61 vocational students who were attending school full-time and 114 who attend part-time.

The professional program lasts three years and prepares a student for a job in engineering, nursing, computer science, business, tourism and similar fields. There were 20 students in the professional program.

As of 2000, there were 81 students in Biasca who came from another municipality, while 193 residents attended schools outside the municipality.

== Transport ==
Biasca is served by the Biasca station, situated within the municipality. The station is on the Gotthard railway.

== Sport ==
The HCB Ticino Rockets were the city's main team and play in the Swiss League (SL) as the affiliate of both HC Lugano and HC Ambrì-Piotta of the National League (NL). They play their home games in the 3,800-seat Raiffeisen BiascArena.

== Notable people ==
- Roberto Donetta (born 1865 in Biasca, dead 1932) photographer.
- Aurelio Galfetti (born 1936 in Biasca) architect
- Ignazio Cassis (born 1961 in Sessa) physician and member of the Swiss Federal Council
- Giuseppe Miccolis (born 1976 in Biasca) an Italian football midfielder
