= Sobrio =

- Former municipality
- Flag Coat of arms
- Location of Sobrio
- Location within Switzerland Location within Canton of Ticino
- Coordinates: 46°24′N 8°54′E
- Country: Switzerland
- Canton: Ticino
- District: Leventina

Government
  - Mayor: Sindaco

Area
  - Total: 6.37 km^{2} (2.46 sq mi)
- Elevation: 1,117 m (3,665 ft)

Population (December 2014)
  - Total: 80
  - Density: 13/km^{2} (33/sq mi)
- Time zone: UTC+01:00 (CET)
  - Summer (DST): UTC+02:00 (CEST)
- Postal code: 6749
- SFOS number: 5081
- ISO 3166 code: CH-TI
- Surrounded by: Acquarossa, Bodio, Cavagnago, Giornico, Ludiano, Semione
- Website: www.faido.ch

Sobrio is a former municipality in the district of Leventina in the canton of Ticino in Switzerland. On 10 April 2016 it merged into the municipality of Faido.

== Geography ==
Sobrio had an area, as of 1997, of 6.37 square kilometers (2.46 sq mi). Of this area, 0.62 km^{2} (0.24 sq mi) or 9.7% is used for agricultural purposes, while 4.47 km^{2} (1.73 sq mi) or 70.2% is forested. Of the rest of the land, 0.2 km^{2} (0.077 sq mi) or 3.1% is settled (buildings or roads) and 0.69 km^{2} (0.27 sq mi) or 10.8% is unproductive land.

Of the built up area, housing and buildings made up 2.7% and transportation infrastructure made up 0.5%. Out of the forested land, 64.4% of the total land area is heavily forested and 3.1% is covered with orchards or small clusters of trees. Of the agricultural land, 7.1% is used for growing crops and 2.7% is used for alpine pastures. Of the unproductive areas, 6.4% is unproductive vegetation and 4.4% is too rocky for vegetation.

== Coat of arms ==
The blazon of the municipal coat of arms is Gules a cat sejant guardant Argent. The cat on the flag of Sobrio comes from the nickname given to the inhabitants of this municipality."

== Demographics ==
Sobrio had a population (as of 2014) of 80. As of 2008, 2.4% of the population are resident foreign nationals. Over the last 10 years (1997–2007) the population has changed at a rate of 3.8%.

Most of the population (as of 2000) speaks Italian(79.7%), with German being second most common (18.9%) and French being third ( 1.4%). Of the Swiss national languages (as of 2000), 14 speak German, 1 person speaks French, 59 people speak Italian.

As of 2008, the gender distribution of the population was 51.9% male and 48.1% female. The population was made up of 42 Swiss men (51.9% of the population) and 39 Swiss women (48.1%). In 2008 there was 1 live birth to Swiss citizens and 1 death of a Swiss citizen. There was 1 non-Swiss woman who immigrated from another country to Switzerland. The total Swiss population change in 2008 (from all sources) was an increase of 2 and the non-Swiss population change was an increase of 1 people. This represents a population growth rate of 3.7%.

The age distribution, as of 2009, in Sobrio is; 10 children or 12.3% of the population are between 0 and 9 years old and 7 teenagers or 8.6% are between 10 and 19. Of the adult population, 9 people or 11.1% of the population are between 20 and 29 years old. 3 people or 3.7% are between 30 and 39, 8 people or 9.9% are between 40 and 49, and 16 people or 19.8% are between 50 and 59. The senior population distribution is 6 people or 7.4% of the population are between 60 and 69 years old, 10 people or 12.3% are between 70 and 79, there are 12 people or 14.8% who are over 80.

As of 2000, there were 38 private households in the municipality, and an average of 1.9 persons per household. In 2000 there were 236 single family homes (or 94.8% of the total) out of a total of 249 inhabited buildings. There were 7 two family buildings (2.8%) and 2 multi-family buildings (0.8%). There were also 4 buildings in the municipality that were multipurpose buildings (used for both housing and commercial or another purpose).

The vacancy rate for the municipality, in 2008, was 0%. In 2000 there were 260 apartments in the municipality. The most common apartment size was the 4 room apartment of which there were 80. There were 22 single room apartments and 59 apartments with five or more rooms. Of these apartments, a total of 38 apartments (14.6% of the total) were permanently occupied, while 221 apartments (85.0%) were seasonally occupied and 1 apartment (0.4%) was empty. As of 2007, the construction rate of new housing units was 0 new units per 1000 residents.

The historical population is given in the following table:

year	population
1950	98
1960	69
1970	61
1980	84
1990	78
2000	74

== Sights ==
The entire village of Sobrio-Ronzano is designated as part of the Inventory of Swiss Heritage Sites.

== Politics ==
In the 2007 federal election the most popular party was the CVP which received 30.43% of the vote. The next three most popular parties were the FDP (21.74%), the SP (17.75%) and the Ticino League (13.77%). In the federal election, a total of 35 votes were cast, and the voter turnout was 56.5%.

In the 2007 Gran Consiglio election, there were a total of 58 registered voters in Sobrio, of which 45 or 77.6% voted. 1 blank ballot was cast, leaving 44 valid ballots in the election. The most popular party was the PPD+GenGiova which received 17 or 38.6% of the vote. The next three most popular parties were; the PLRT (with 9 or 20.5%), the SSI (with 7 or 15.9%) and the LEGA (with 4 or 9.1%).

In the 2007 Consiglio di Stato election, The most popular party was the PPD which received 16 or 35.6% of the vote. The next three most popular parties were; the SSI (with 11 or 24.4%), the PLRT (with 10 or 22.2%) and the LEGA (with 3 or 6.7%).

== Economy ==
As of 2007, Sobrio had an unemployment rate of 1%. As of 2005, there were 9 people employed in the primary economic sector and about 3 businesses involved in this sector. people were employed in the secondary sector and there were businesses in this sector. 2 people were employed in the tertiary sector, with 2 businesses in this sector. There were 24 residents of the municipality who were employed in some capacity, of which females made up 33.3% of the workforce.

In 2000, there were 11 workers who commuted into the municipality and 12 workers who commuted away. The municipality is a net exporter of workers, with about 1.1 workers leaving the municipality for every one entering. Of the working population, 4.2% used public transportation to get to work, and 58.3% used a private car. As of 2009, there was one hotel in Sobrio.

== Religion ==
From the 2000 census, 57 or 77.0% were Roman Catholic, while 7 or 9.5% belonged to the Swiss Reformed Church. There are 10 individuals (or about 13.51% of the population) who belong to another church (not listed on the census).

== Education ==
In Sobrio about 81.3% of the population (between age 25-64) have completed either non-mandatory upper secondary education or additional higher education (either university or a Fachhochschule).

In Sobrio there were a total of 13 students (as of 2009). The Ticino education system provides up to three years of non-mandatory kindergarten and in Sobrio there were 3 children in kindergarten. The primary school program lasts for five years and includes both a standard school and a special school. In the municipality, 2 students attended the standard primary schools and 0 students attended the special school. In the lower secondary school system, students either attend a two-year middle school followed by a two-year pre-apprenticeship or they attend a four-year program to prepare for higher education. There were 5 students in the two-year middle school.

The upper secondary school includes several options, but at the end of the upper secondary program, a student will be prepared to enter a trade or to continue on to a university or college. In Ticino, vocational students may either attend school while working on their internship or apprenticeship (which takes three or four years) or may attend school followed by an internship or apprenticeship (which takes one year as a full-time student or one and a half to two years as a part-time student). There were 0 vocational students who were attending school full-time and 2 who attend part-time.

The professional program lasts three years and prepares a student for a job in engineering, nursing, computer science, business, tourism and similar fields. There was 1 student in the professional program.

As of 2000, there were 1 students in Sobrio who came from another municipality, while 8 residents attended schools outside the municipality.
