= Val Medel =

Coordinates: 46.633328°N 8.83333°E

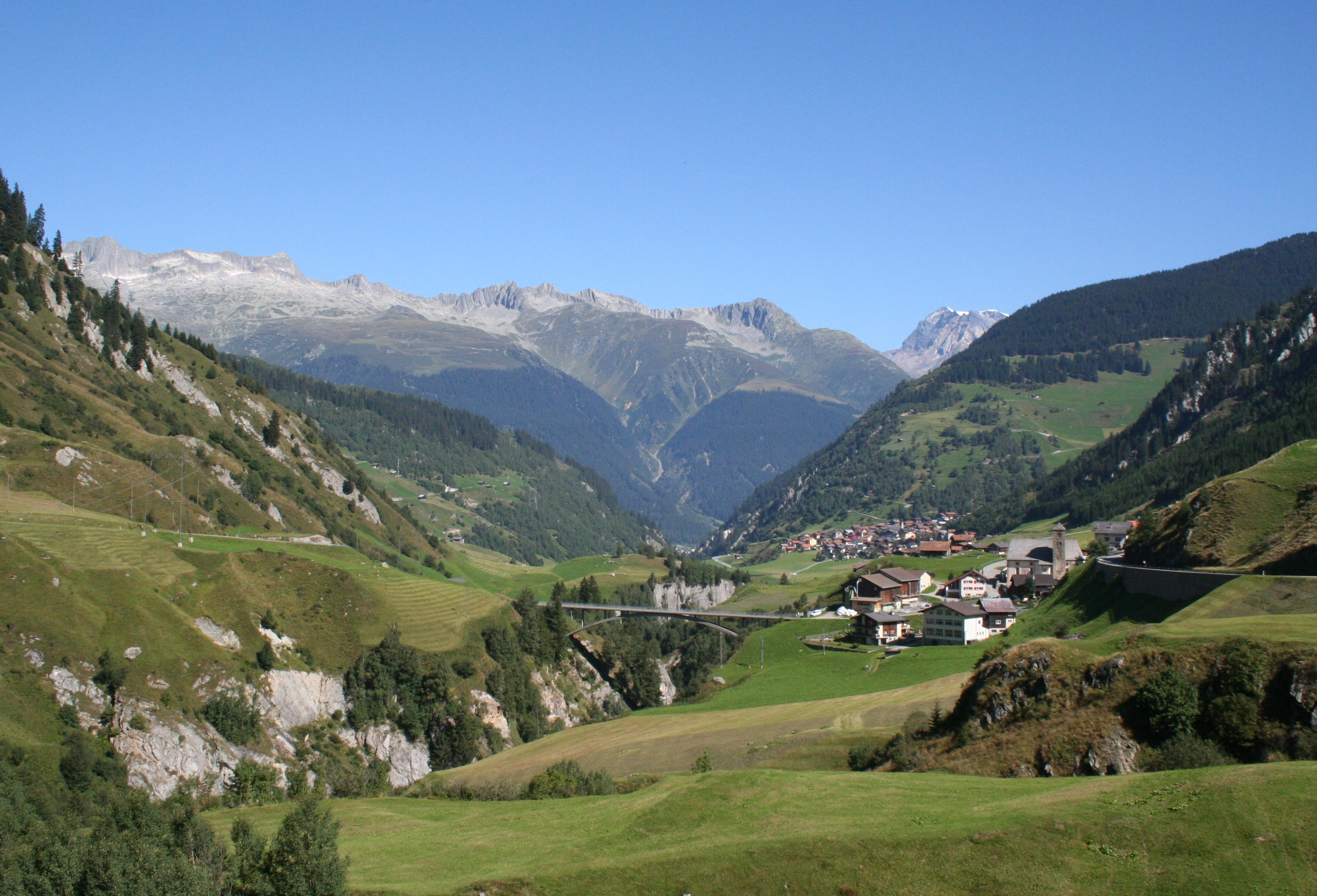
Val Medel near Platta

The Val Medel ([ˌvalˈmedəl]) is a righthand side valley of the Surselva valley in Graubünden, Switzerland. It is approximately 15 km (9.3 mi) long and stretches from Disentis (1,100 m (3,600 ft) above sea level) to the south, where it ends at Lai da Sontga Maria reservoir on Lukmanier Pass (906 m (2,972 ft) above sea level). There is a road through the valley and over Lukmanier Pass into Ticino.

The lower 3 kilometers (1.9 mi) of the valley contains a narrow gorge, known as the Medelserschluch or Las Ruinas, which widens to the green and fertile Trog valley at the village of Curaglia.

== Settlements ==
The only municipality in the valley is Medel, which encompasses the numerous villages, hamlets and isolated settlements on both sides of the valley. The largest and most northerly village is Curaglia. Other settlements are (from north to south) Mutschnengia, Platta, Pardes, and Fuorns Acla. The whole municipality stretches over 136 square kilometers (53 sq mi), of which over 136 km^{2} (53 sq mi) is unproductive.

== Language and religion ==
An intermediate form between the Disentis and Tujetsch dialects of the Sursilvan language is spoken in the Val Medel. The vast majority of the population is Catholic.

== Waters ==
The river Froda flows through the uppermost portion of the valley. It begins in the Lai da Sontga Maria reservoir. At the hamlet of Pardatsch (1,559 m (5,115 ft)), the Froda merges with the Rein da Cristallina (which emerges from the Val Cristallina), to form the Rein da Medel, which flows into the Anterior Rhine at Disentis. Many small tributaries flow into Rein da Medel from both sides.

== Side Valleys ==
At Curaglia the Val Plattas branches off to the south east. Near Pardatsch, the Val Cristallina branches off, also to the south east.

== Gallery ==
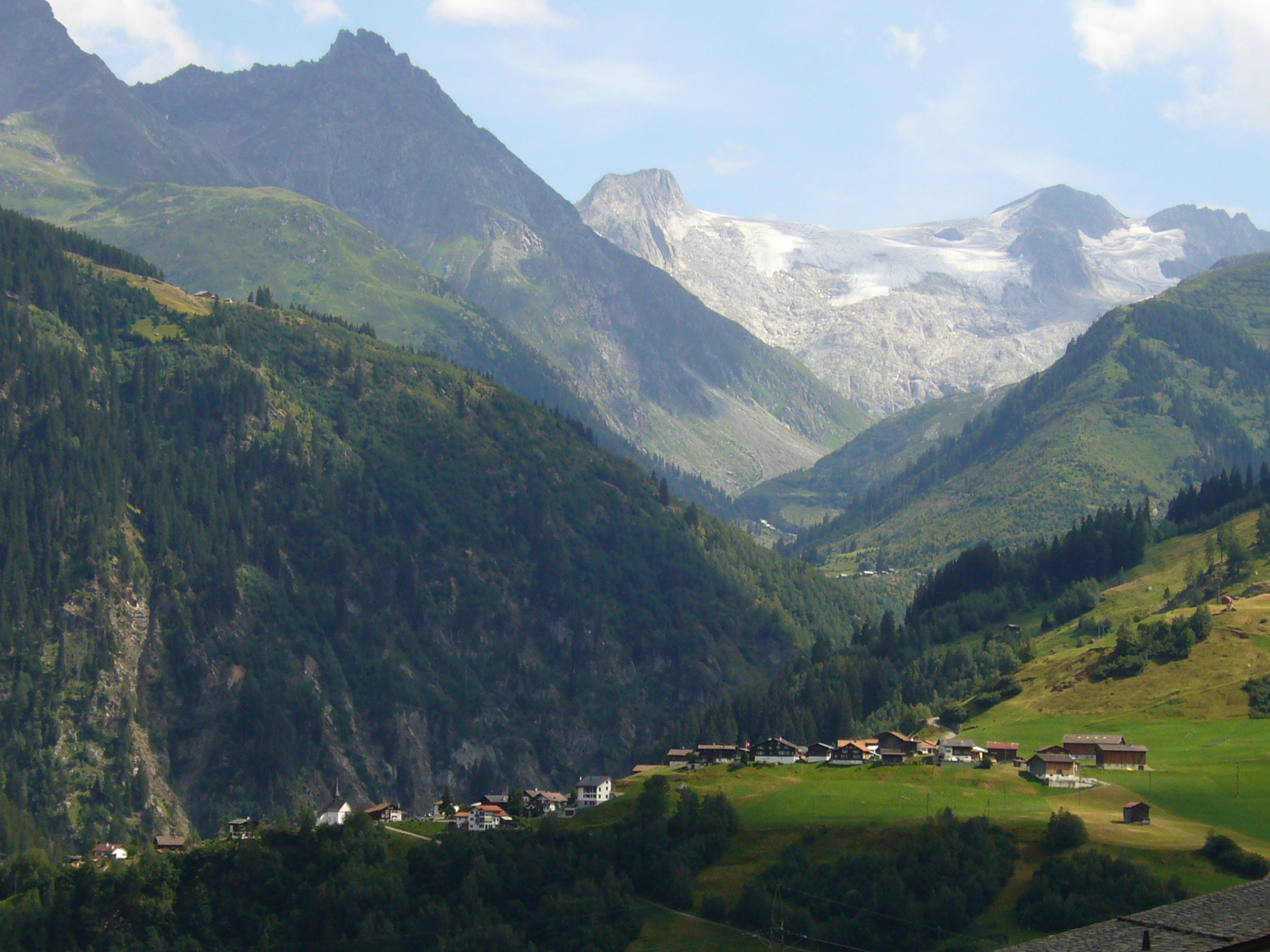
Views of the Val Plattas, with the Piz Medel the middle and the village of Medel in front of Val Plattas

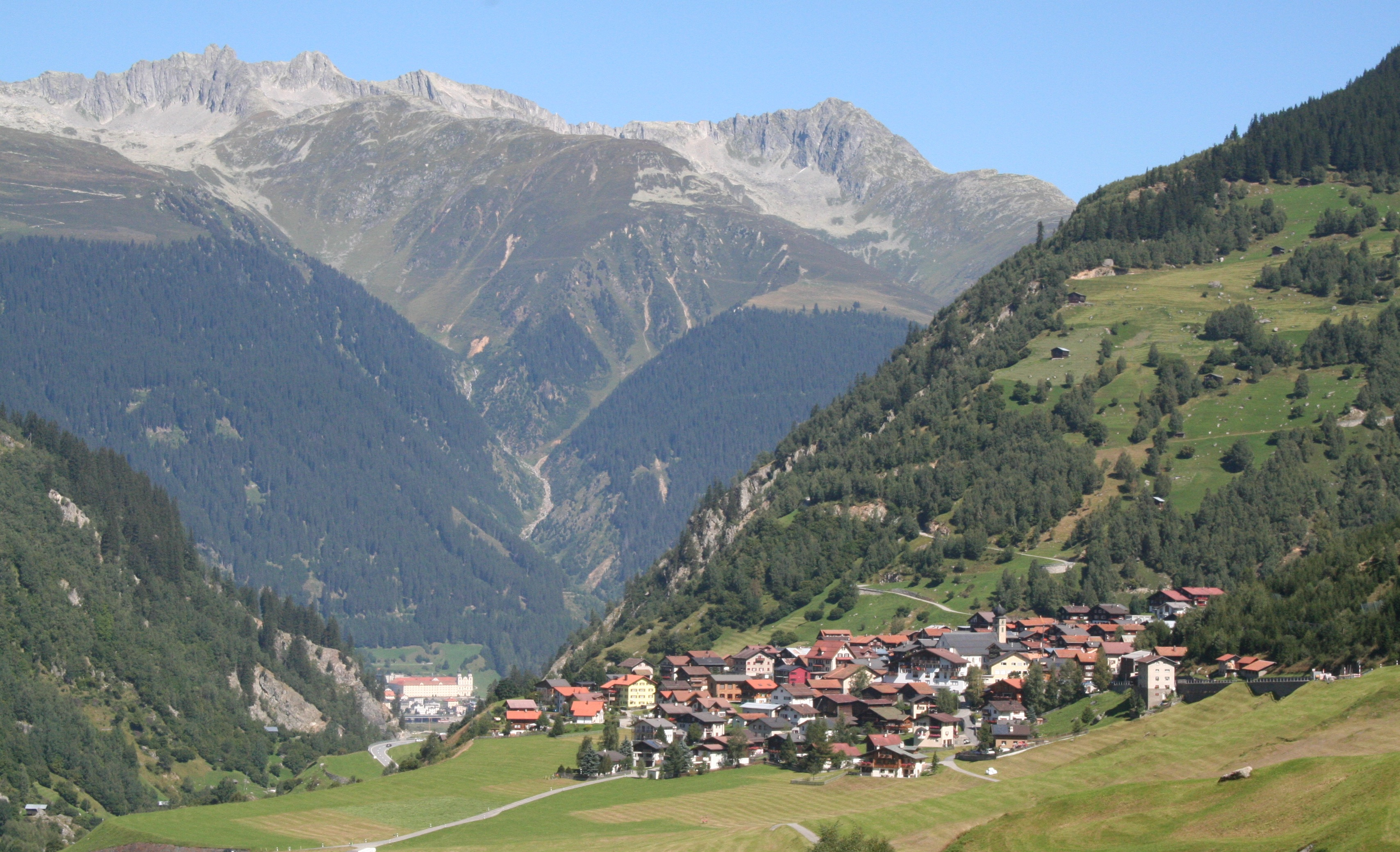
Curaglia, in the background Disentis Abbey

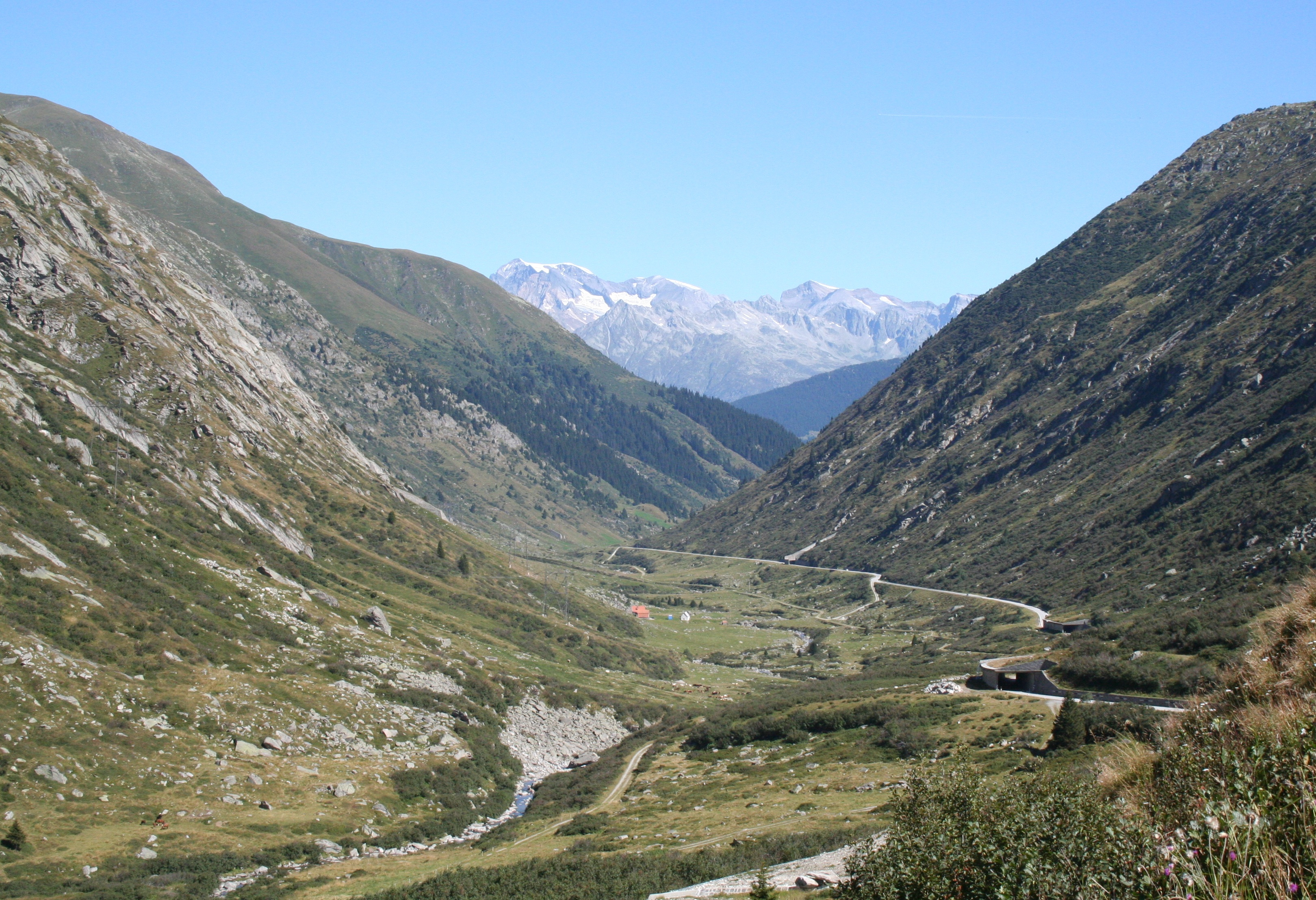
Southern part of the valley at Sogn Gagl

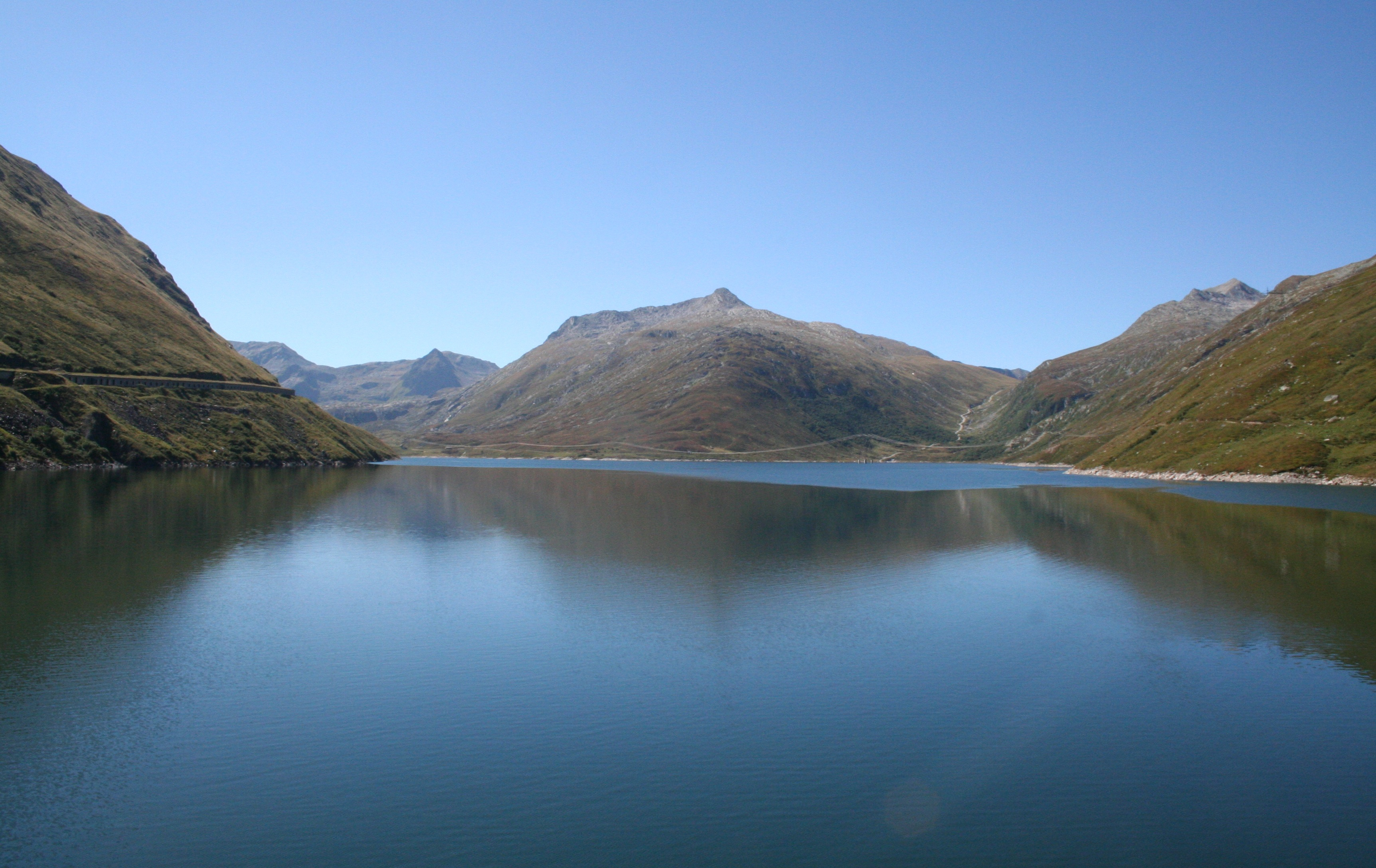
Lai da Sontga Maria
