= Olivone =

- Former municipality
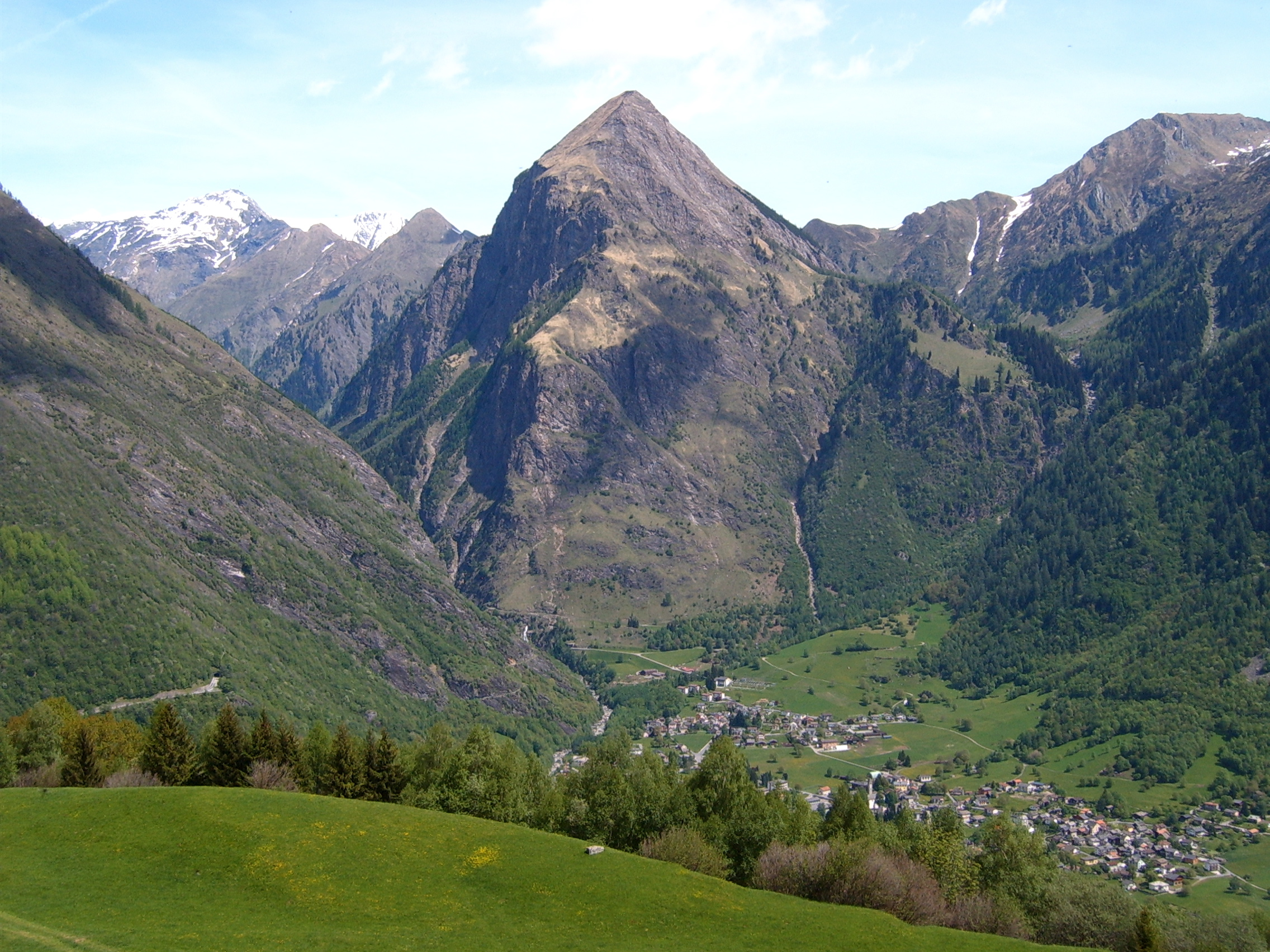
- Olivone at the feet of Sosto (2.221 m)

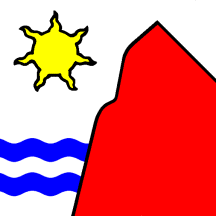
- Flag Coat of arms
- Location of Olivone
- Location within Switzerland Location within Canton of Ticino
- Coordinates: 46°32′N 8°57′E
- Country: Switzerland
- Canton: Ticino
- District: Blenio

Area
  - Total: 76.1 km^{2} (29.4 sq mi)
- Elevation: 902 m (2,959 ft)

Population (December 2004)
  - Total: 867
  - Density: 11.4/km^{2} (29.5/sq mi)
- Time zone: UTC+01:00 (CET)
  - Summer (DST): UTC+02:00 (CEST)
- Postal code: 6718
- SFOS number: 5043
- ISO 3166 code: CH-TI
- Surrounded by: Acquarossa, Aquila, Calpiogna, Campello, Campo (Blenio), Faido, Ghirone, Mairengo, Medel (Lucmagn) (GR), Osco, Quinto, Vals (GR)
- Website: www.olivone.ch

Olivone was a municipality in the district of Blenio in the canton of Ticino in Switzerland.

On 25 January 2005, the cantonal authorities announced that Olivone would merge with Aquila, Campo Blenio, Ghirone and Torre to form a new municipality to be called Blenio. This union was carried through on 22 October 2006.

== History ==
Aerial view from 2200 m by Walter Mittelholzer (1923)

Olivone is first mentioned in 1193 as Alivoni, then in 1205 it was mentioned as Orivono. In Romansh it was known as Luorscha.

The political power in the upper Blenio valley was in the hands of a branch of the De Torre family. They owned land in Olivone and possessed the patronage rights in the parish church until the oath of Torre in 1182 ended their supremacy. In 1213 the villages of Olivone and Aquila revolted and united against the Da Locarno family, who had been given power over the valley by canons of Milan. They were able to drive out the Da Locarno's and return to the previous situation, where they were ruled by a governor out of Lombardy. The L'assemblea di uomini liberi (The Assembly of the Free), which is first mentioned in 1136, provided for the management of common forests, alpine pastures and helped maintain the Lukmanier and Greina passes. By the end of the 14th century the L'assemblea di uomini liberi took advantage of Olivone's lease on the Santa Maria alpine pasture, which belonged to the abbey of Disentis. The village customary law was written down in the statutes of 1237 and 1474.

During the Early Middle Ages, Olivone was probably the center of a parish that was over the whole valley. Starting in the High and Late Middle Ages, the village's history follows the course of the entire valley. The Parish Church of S. Martino was built before 1136, and in the 17th century, was rebuilt, followed by renovations in 1974 and 1984–91. The church contains frescos from the 17th and 18th centuries. Valuable furnishings and vestments are on display in the Cà da Rivöi (Rivöi means Olivone in the local dialect), a building from the 15th century.

On Lukmanier street the hospice of SS Sepolcro e Barnaba at Casaccia, was built in 1104. This was followed by the Hospice of S. Defendente in Camperio, built in 1254. The noble families of da Torre and da Lodrino probably founded these two hospices. They were later managed by the neighborhood and had until the 15th century, were of major social and economic importance.

Much of the local economy was based on agriculture (dairy farming and livestock). However, between the 15th century and the 19th century, much of the economy depended on money sent back home from emigrants to Italy, France and England as well as other cities in Switzerland. The chocolate makers from Olivone enjoyed a good reputation in Italy and France starting in the 17th century. In the last decades of the 19th century, tourism became important. In the 20th century, tourism grew in importance and initiatives for nature and heritage protection were further promoted. At the beginning of the 21st century the village was known for its winter and summer tourism. Olivone retained its agricultural character, but in 1956 it became home to the Blenio Kraftwerke AG power plant and certain construction companies. It houses the Alpine Institute of Chemistry and Toxicology (2006) of the Alpine Foundation for Life Sciences. In 2005, 22% of jobs in Olivone were in agriculture.

== Historic population ==
The historical population is given in the following table:

Year	Population Olivone
1567	593
1602	1,000
1682	1,018
1745	734
1785	640
1801	644
1850	758
1900	765
1950	707
1960	930
2000	845
