= Scopi =

Mountain in Switzerland

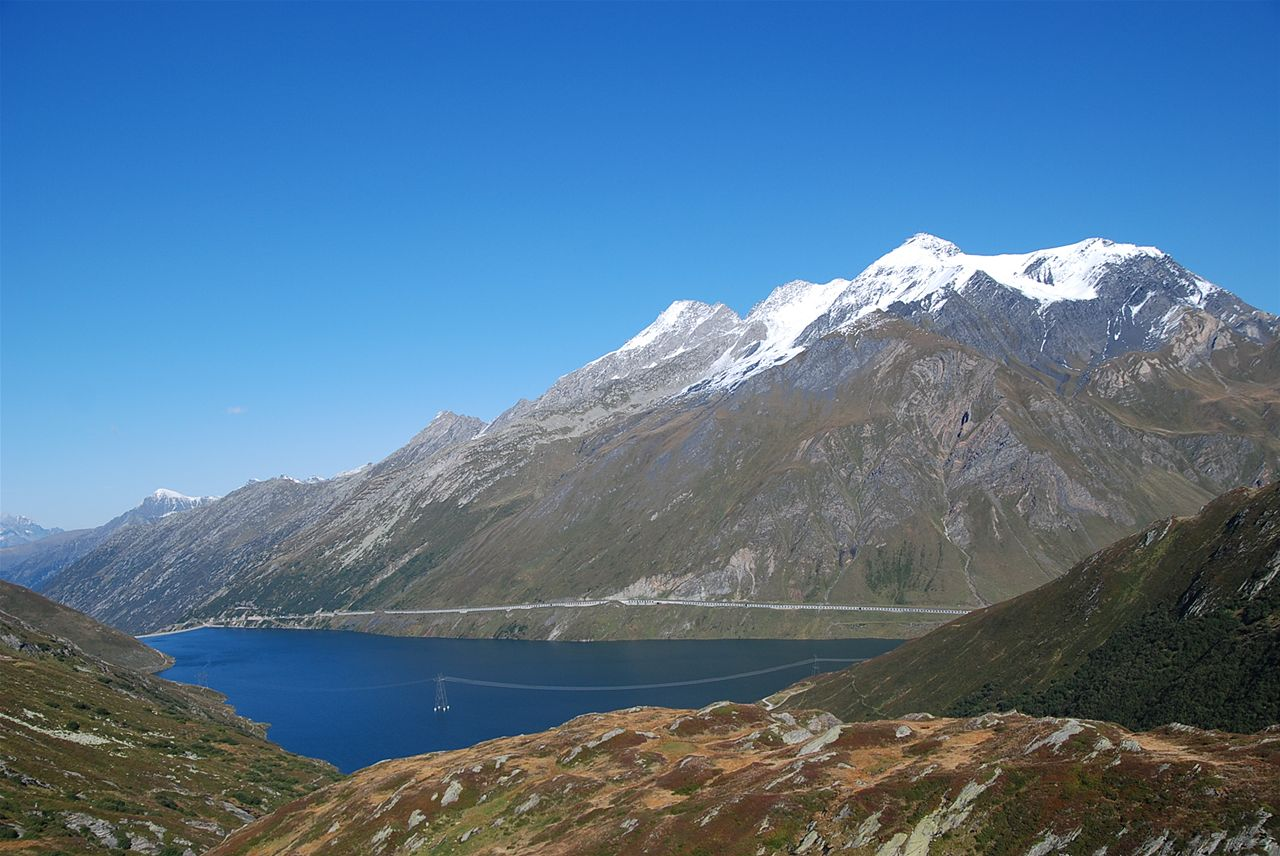
- The Scopi seen from across Lai da Sontga Maria

Highest point
- Elevation: 3,190 m (10,470 ft)
- Prominence: 792 m (2,598 ft)
- Parent peak: Piz Medel
- Listing: Alpine mountains above 3000 m
- Coordinates: 46°34′18″N 8°49′48″E

Geography
- Location within Switzerland
- Location: Graubünden/Ticino, Switzerland
- Parent range: Lepontine Alps

The Scopi is a 3,190-metre-high mountain in the Lepontine Alps, overlooking Lukmanier Pass on the border between the cantons of Ticino and Graubünden.

A cable car (not accessible to public) connects the summit from the road of Lukmanier Pass below the dam, and on the top lies a radar (FLORAKO) and an air traffic control building, owned by the Swiss Army. There are, however, no climbing restrictions, and the summit can by reached via a marked trail from Lai da Sontga Maria near the pass.
