= Piz Vial =

Mountain in Switzerland

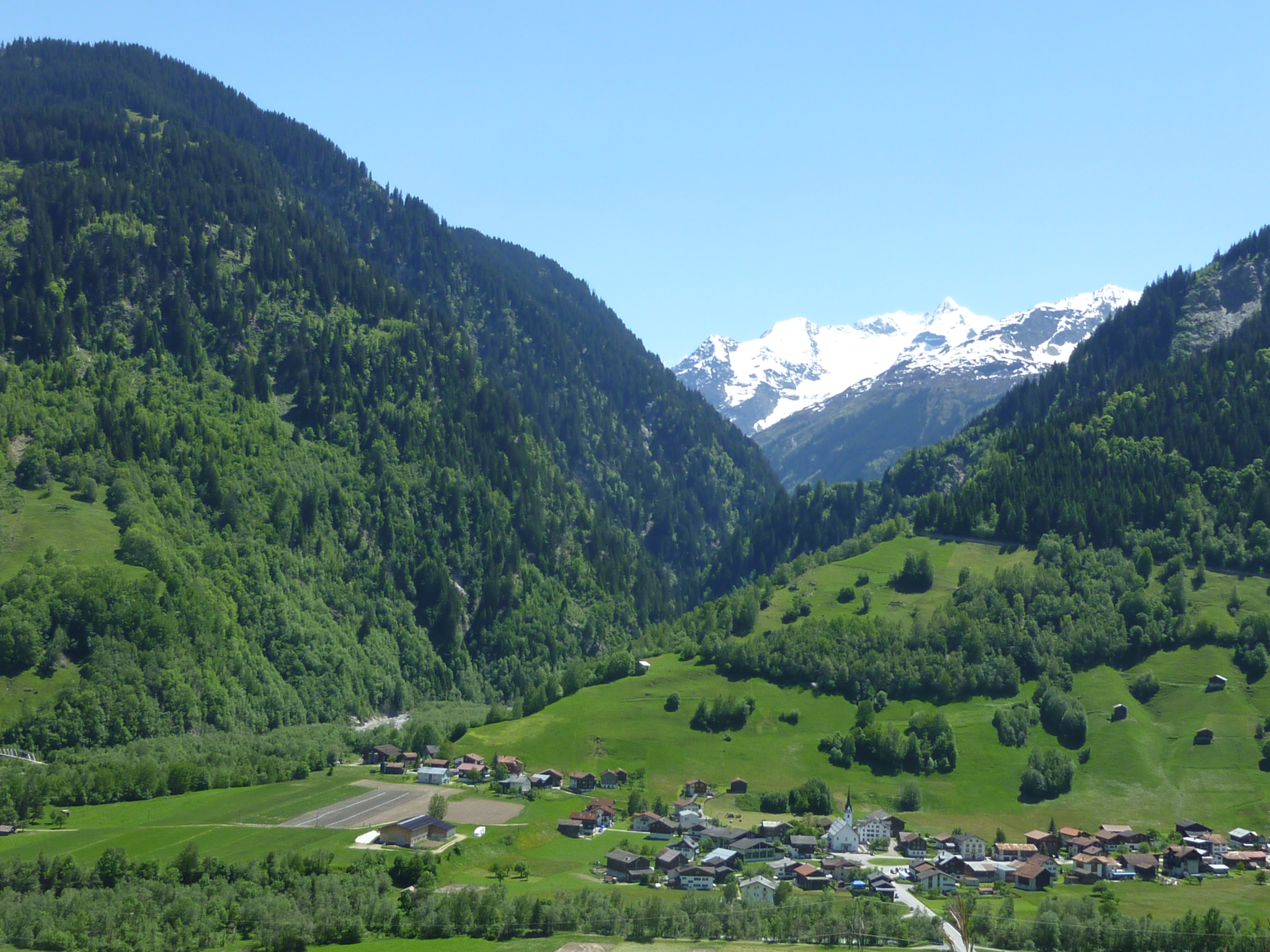
- View of Piz Vial (background) from Val Sumvitg

Highest point
- Elevation: 3,168 m (10,394 ft)
- Prominence: 465 m (1,526 ft)
- Parent peak: Piz Medel
- Listing: Alpine mountains above 3000 m
- Coordinates: 46°37′54.9″N 8°58′8.9″E

Geography
- Location within Switzerland
- Location: Graubünden, Switzerland
- Parent range: Lepontine Alps

Piz Vial is a 3,168 metres high mountain of the Swiss Lepontine Alps, located south of Sumvitg in the canton of Graubünden. The summit, located one kilometres east of the canton of Ticino border, overlooks, together with its highest neighbour Piz Medel, the plateau of the Greina.

The massif of Piz Vial consists of several summits (from west to east): Piz Valdraus (3,096 metres, northernmost point of Ticino), Piz Gaglianera (3,121 metres), Piz Vial and Piz Greina (3,124 metres). The northern crest of Piz Vial separates two glaciers, Glatscher da Valdraus on the west and another smaller glacier on the east.
