= Piz Rondadura =

Mountain in Switzerland

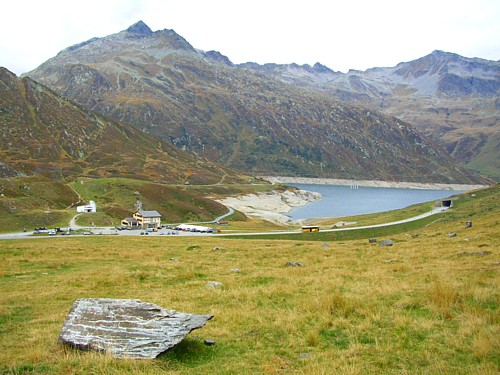
- Piz Rondadura (left peak) and Lake Sontga Maria from the Lukmanier Pass.

Highest point
- Elevation: 3,016 m (9,895 ft)
- Prominence: 266 m (873 ft)
- Parent peak: Piz Blas
- Coordinates: 46°34′34.5″N 8°45′2.7″E

Geography
- Location within Switzerland
- Location: Graubünden/Ticino, Switzerland
- Parent range: Lepontine Alps

Piz Rondadura is a mountain in the Lepontine Alps in Switzerland, located on the border between the cantons of Graubünden and Ticino. It overlooks Lukmanier Pass and Lake Sontga Maria on its east side.
