= Piz Caschleglia =

Mountain in Switzerland

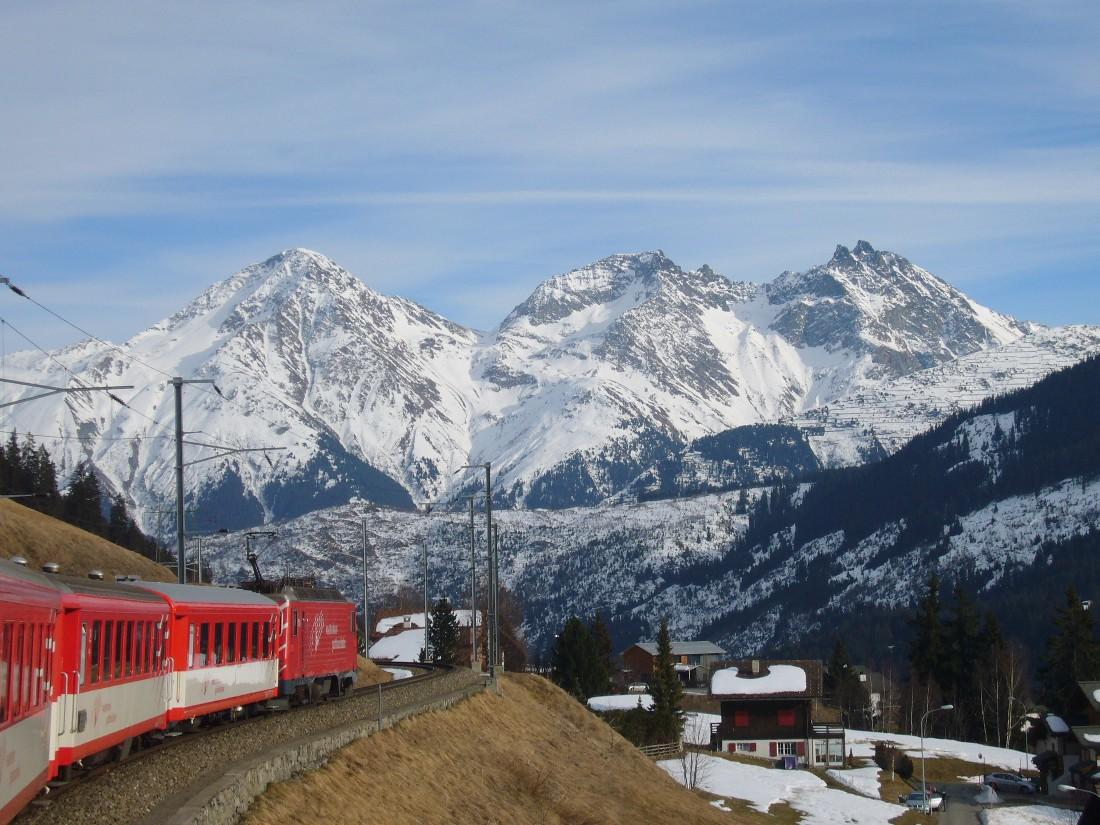
- Piz Caschleglia (right peak) from the north side

Highest point
- Elevation: 2,936 m (9,633 ft)
- Prominence: 136 m (446 ft)
- Parent peak: Piz Miez
- Coordinates: 46°39′05.6″N 8°54′15.9″E

Geography
- Location within Switzerland
- Location: Graubünden, Switzerland
- Parent range: Lepontine Alps

Piz Caschleglia is a mountain of the Swiss Lepontine Alps, located south of Curaglia in the canton of Graubünden. It lies north of Piz Medel, between the Val Medel and the Val Sumvitg.
