= Piz Miez (Lepontine Alps) =

Mountain in Switzerland

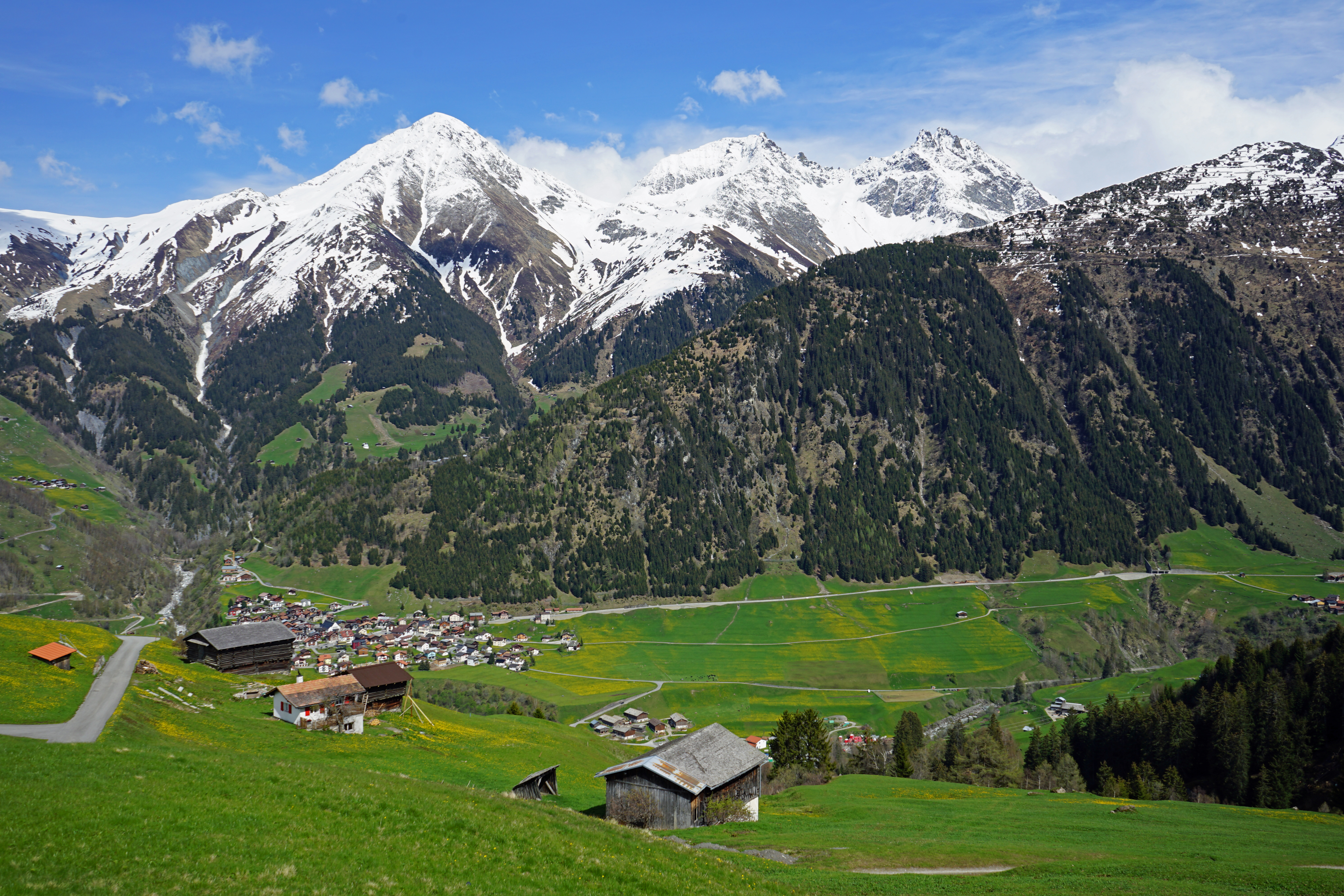
- Piz Muraun, Piz Cazirauns and Piz Caschleglia

Highest point
- Elevation: 2,956 m (9,698 ft)
- Prominence: 456 m (1,496 ft)
- Parent peak: Piz Medel
- Coordinates: 46°39′17″N 8°55′00″E

Geography
- Location within Switzerland
- Location: Graubünden, Switzerland
- Parent range: Lepontine Alps

Piz Miez (2,956 m) is a mountain of the Swiss Lepontine Alps, located south of Tenigerbad in the canton of Graubünden. It lies north of Piz Medel, in the Val Sumvitg.
