= Aquila, Switzerland =

Aquila
- Former municipality
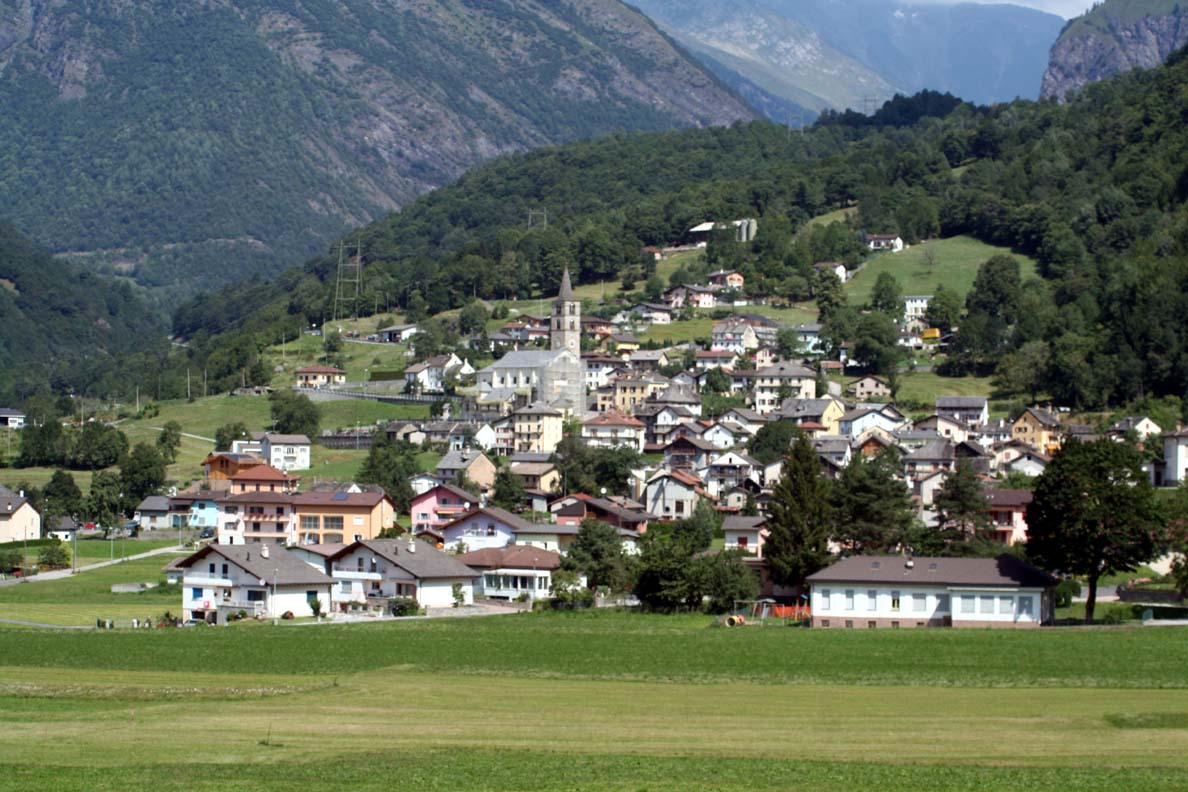

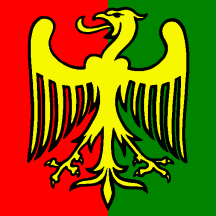
- Flag Coat of arms
- Location of Aquila
- Location within Switzerland Location within Canton of Ticino
- Coordinates: 46°30′N 8°57′E
- Country: Switzerland
- Canton: Ticino
- District: Blenio
- Municipality: Blenio

Area
  - Total: 63.00 km^{2} (24.32 sq mi)
- Elevation: 782 m (2,566 ft)

Population (December 2004)
  - Total: 528
  - Density: 8.38/km^{2} (21.7/sq mi)
- Time zone: UTC+01:00 (CET)
  - Summer (DST): UTC+02:00 (CEST)
- Postal code: 6719
- SFOS number: 5031
- ISO 3166 code: CH-TI
- Surrounded by: Acquarossa, Ghirone, Hinterrhein (GR), Malvaglia, Medel (Lucmagn) (GR), Olivone, Torre, Vals (GR), Vrin (GR)
- Website

Aquila is a former municipality in the district of Blenio in the canton of Ticino in Switzerland.

On 25 January 2005, the cantonal authorities announced that Aquila would merge with Campo Blenio, Ghirone, Olivone and Torre to form a new municipality to be called Blenio. This union was carried through on 22 October 2006.

Aerial view (1953)

== Historic population ==
The historical population is given in the following table:

Year	Population Aquila
1602	600
1801	804
1850	1,040
1900	719
1950	627
2000	487
