= Grumo =

Grumo may refer to several places:

Italy

- Grumo Appula, a municipality in the Province of Bari, Apulia
- Grumo Nevano, a municipality in the Province of Naples, Campania
- Grumo (San Michele all'Adige), a civil parish of San Michele all'Adige (TN), Trentino-South Tyrol

Switzerland

- Grumo (Torre), a village and former municipality merged in Torre and from 2006 part of Blenio, Ticino
