= Campo, Ticino =

Campo, Ticino may refer to:

- Campo, Vallemaggia, a municipality in Vallemaggia Valley, Switzerland
- Campo Blenio, an old municipality now incorporated in Blenio municipality, in Blenio Valley, Switzerland
