= Ghirone =

- Former municipality
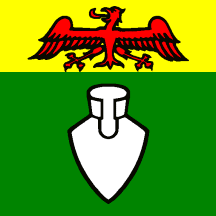
- Flag Coat of arms
- Location of Ghirone
- Location within Switzerland Location within Canton of Ticino
- Coordinates: 46°34′N 8°57′E
- Country: Switzerland
- Canton: Ticino
- District: Blenio

Area
  - Total: 30.35 km^{2} (11.72 sq mi)
- Elevation: 1,247 m (4,091 ft)

Population (December 2004)
  - Total: 40
  - Density: 1.3/km^{2} (3.4/sq mi)
- Time zone: UTC+01:00 (CET)
  - Summer (DST): UTC+02:00 (CEST)
- Postal code: 6720
- SFOS number: 5036
- ISO 3166 code: CH-TI
- Surrounded by: Aquila, Campo (Blenio), Medel (Lucmagn) (GR), Olivone, Vrin (GR)
- Website

Ghirone was a municipality in the district of Blenio in the canton of Ticino in Switzerland.

On 25 January 2005, the cantonal authorities announced that Ghirone would merge with Aquila, Campo Blenio, Olivone and Torre to form a new municipality to be called Blenio. This union was carried through on 22 October 2006.

== History ==
Ghirone is first mentioned in 1200 as Agairono.

In 1334, Disentis Abbey acquired rights over all the land in Ghirone. The village was part of the community of Aquila, and in 1803 it merged with the municipality of Ghirone. Then, in 1836, Buttino and Ghirone separated from Aquila and together founded their own community. Buttino was inhabited until the late 19th Century and was an autonomous village as far back as the 13th Century. The two municipalities rejoined Aquila in 1842 and 1846 and finally separated in 1853. The Citizens Community (Patriziato), which still bears the name of Ghirone-Buttino was founded in 1914.

The Church of SS Martino e Giorgio was first mentioned in 1215 and was rebuilt around 1700. The parish separated from Aquila in 1758 and became independent. As with the other municipalities of the Blenio Valley, much of the population emigrated to other European countries (often as chestnut roaster, servants and waiters). While this was a major source of revenue, it led to a steady population decline. In the late 1950s the Luzzone Dam (1995 and 1999 expanded) was built between the municipalities of Ghirone and Aquila. The dam is used to generate hydroelectric power. The large-scale construction of the dam and the new road tunnel at Toira in 1958, improved the local economy. The new tunnel allowed winter and summer tourism, and the development of a winter sports center (with Campo Blenio) gave the economy a definite boost. Livestock farming, which was for centuries had been the main occupation, however, fell sharply.

== Historic population ==
The historical population is given in the following table:

Year	Population Ghirone
1836	162 ^{a}
1860	111
1900	81
1910	100
1950	70
1960	340 ^{b}
1970	64
2000	44

^a includes Buttino
^b During construction of the Luzzone Dam
