= Lai da Sontga Maria =

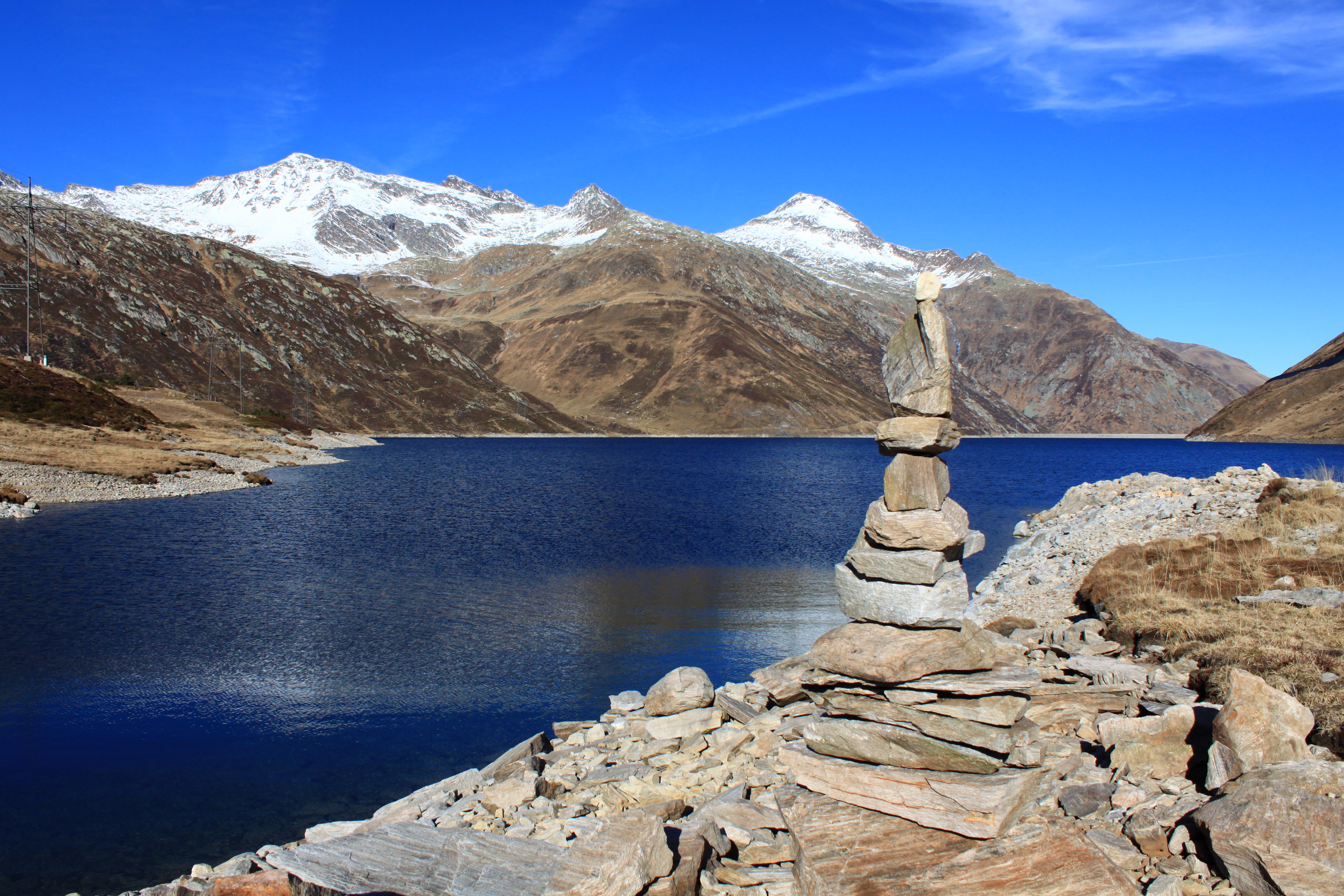
- Looking towards the Gannaretsch range from near the pass

- Location within Canton of Graubünden Location within Canton of Ticino Location within Switzerland Location within Alps
- Interactive map of Lai da Sontga Maria
- Location: Graubünden/Ticino, Switzerland
- Coordinates: 46°34′30″N 8°47′45″E
- Type: reservoir
- Primary inflows: Reno di Medel, Murinascia Grande, various creeks
- Primary outflows: Froda
- Catchment area: 27.1 km^{2} (10.5 sq mi)
- Basin countries: Switzerland
- Surface area: 1.77 km^{2} (0.68 sq mi)
- Max. depth: 86 m (282 ft)
- Surface elevation: 1,908 m (6,260 ft)

Lai da Sontga Maria (Italian: Lago di Santa Maria) is a lake, located north of the Lukmanier Pass in Switzerland. It lies almost entirely in the municipality of Medel (canton of Graubünden), a tiny fraction of the south-west part of the lake belonging to the municipalities of Quinto and Blenio (canton of Ticino). The reservoir has a surface area is 1.77 km^{2} (0.68 sq mi). The arch dam Santa Maria, which is to the north of the lake, was completed in 1968. The main road of the Lukmanier Pass runs along the eastern shore of the lake.

The lake lies at a height of 1,908 metres above sea level and is surrounded by mountains over 3,000 metres on both sides. The highest peak overlooking Lai da Sontga Maria is the Scopi (3,190 m), on the east side. On the west side are Piz Gannaretsch (3,040 m) and Piz Rondadura (3,016 m). On the south side (in Ticino), the lake is overlooked by Pizzo dell'Uomo (2,663 m). The lake is drained by the Rein da Medel, a tributary of the Anterior Rhine.

In the lake, there is an anchor pylon of Lukmanier Powerline.

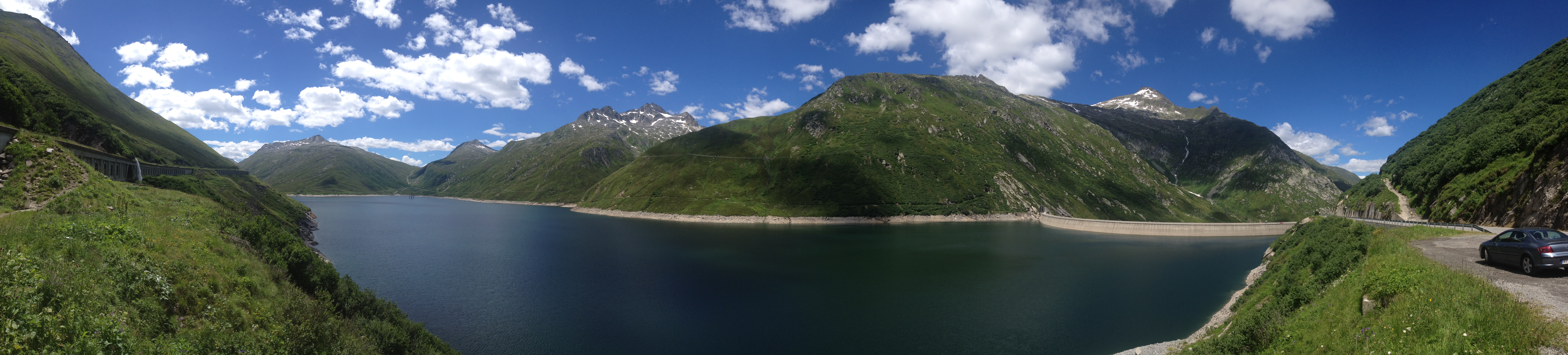
View from near the dam (right)

== See also ==
- List of lakes of Switzerland
- List of mountain lakes of Switzerland
