= Pizzo Marumo =

Mountain in Switzerland

- Location within Switzerland

Highest point
- Elevation: 2,790 m (9,150 ft)
- Prominence: 435 m (1,427 ft)
- Parent peak: Piz Medel
- Coordinates: 46°35′55.1″N 8°57′34.8″E

Geography
- Location: Ticino, Switzerland
- Parent range: Lepontine Alps

Pizzo Marumo is a mountain of the Lepontine Alps, overlooking the Greina Pass in Switzerland. It is located in the canton of Ticino, near the border with the canton of Graubünden.
