= Medels =

Medels may refer to:

- Medels im Rheinwald, a locality in the municipality of Splügen, Grisons, Switzerland
- Medels im Oberland, the former name of Medel (Lucmagn), Grisons (prior to 1943)
