= Campo Blenio =

- Former municipality
- Flag Coat of arms
- Location of Campo Blenio
- Location within Switzerland Location within Canton of Ticino
- Coordinates: 46°33′N 8°56′E
- Country: Switzerland
- Canton: Ticino
- District: Blenio

Area
  - Total: 21.9 km^{2} (8.5 sq mi)
- Elevation: 1,215 m (3,986 ft)

Population (December 2004)
  - Total: 76
  - Density: 3.5/km^{2} (9.0/sq mi)
- Time zone: UTC+01:00 (CET)
  - Summer (DST): UTC+02:00 (CEST)
- Postal code: 6720
- SFOS number: 5032
- ISO 3166 code: CH-TI
- Surrounded by: Ghirone, Medel (Lucmagn) (GR), Olivone
- Website: www.campoblenio.ch

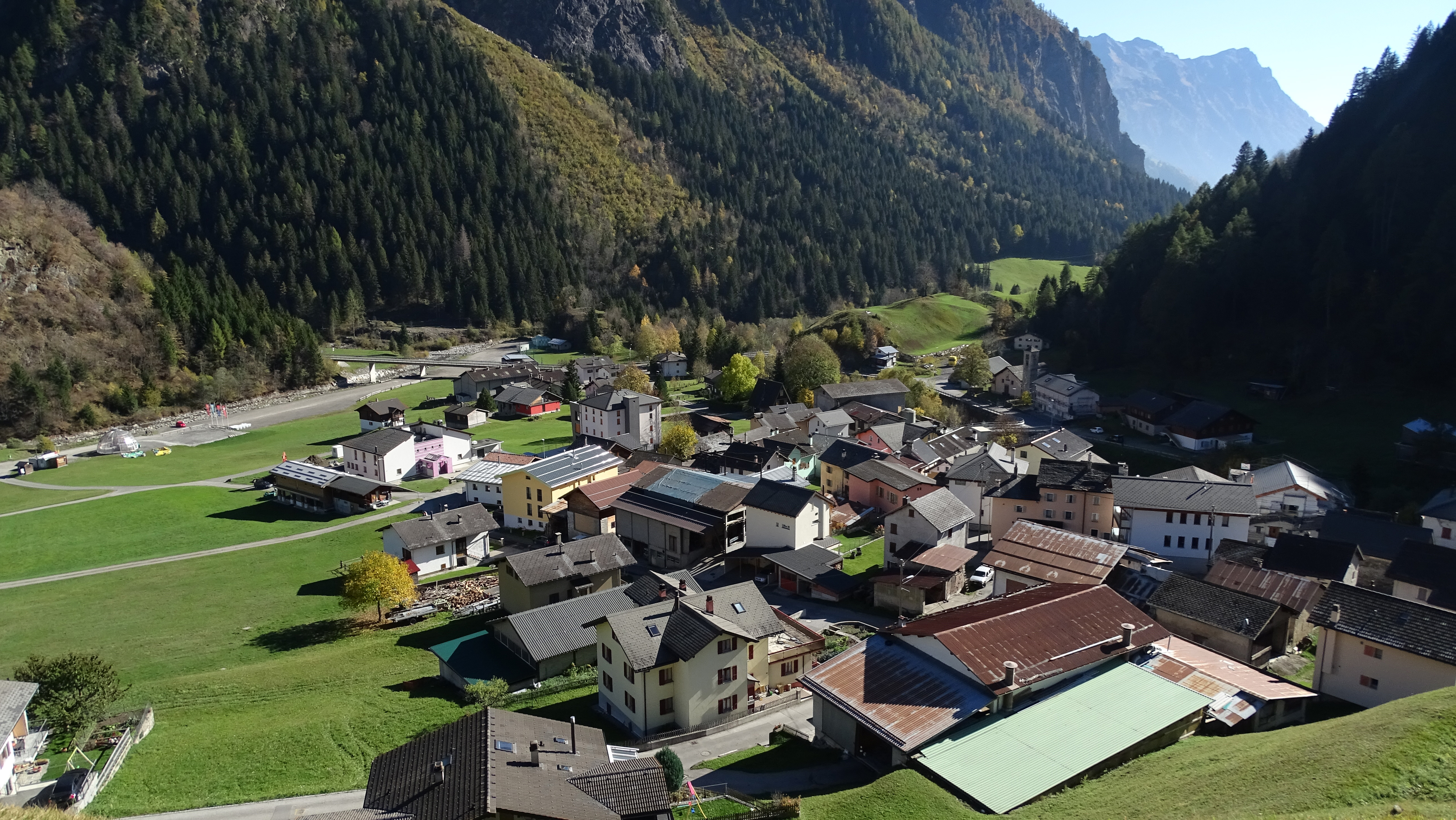
Campo Blenio in Val Camadra, upper Blenio valley

Campo Blenio was a municipality in the district of Blenio in the canton of Ticino in Switzerland.

On 25 January 2005, the cantonal authorities announced that Campo Blenio would merge with Aquila, Ghirone, Olivone and Torre to form a new municipality to be called Blenio. This union was carried through on 22 October 2006.

There are ski slopes operated by Cooperative Society Campo Blenio-Ghirone Tourist Facilities that offers a range of services, managed by Martinelli Gianni. The slopes are particularly suitable for learning to ski and snowboard. The resort also has a 4.5-kilometer lighted slope. For non-skiers, there are enchanting snowshoeing and hiking trails to take in the woods around Campo Blenio-Ghirone.
