= Torre, Switzerland =

Torre
- Former municipality
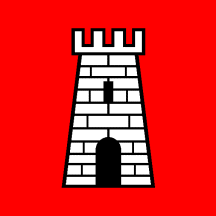
- Flag Coat of arms
- Location of Torre
- Location within Switzerland Location within Canton of Ticino
- Coordinates: 46°29′N 8°57′E
- Country: Switzerland
- Canton: Ticino
- District: Blenio

Area
  - Total: 10.8 km^{2} (4.2 sq mi)
- Elevation: 760 m (2,490 ft)

Population (December 2004)
  - Total: 288
  - Density: 26.7/km^{2} (69.1/sq mi)
- Time zone: UTC+01:00 (CET)
  - Summer (DST): UTC+02:00 (CEST)
- Postal code: 6717
- SFOS number: 5047
- ISO 3166 code: CH-TI
- Surrounded by: Acquarossa, Aquila, Malvaglia
- Website

Torre was a municipality in the district of Blenio in the canton of Ticino in Switzerland.

On 25 January 2005, the cantonal authorities announced that Torre would merge with Aquila, Campo Blenio, Ghirone and Olivone to form a new municipality to be called Blenio. This union was carried through on 22 October 2006.

The Torre Municipal House is home to the Olivone Circle Peace Judicature, the Ul Süril Association, and the midwife office of Sampietro Sicilia Lorenza.

Aerial view (1953)
