= Piz Blas =

Mountain in Switzerland

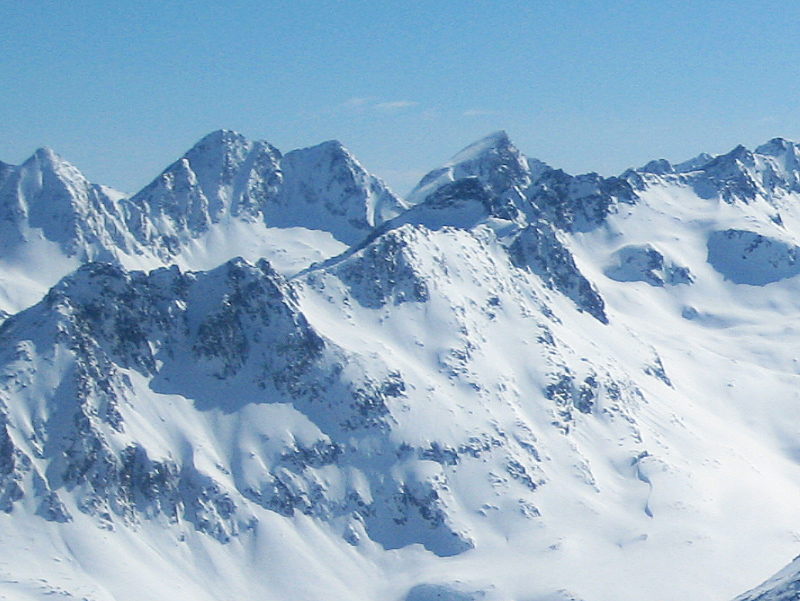
- Piz Blas (centre right) from the west

Highest point
- Elevation: 3,019 m (9,905 ft)
- Prominence: 312 m (1,024 ft)
- Parent peak: Piz Gannaretsch
- Listing: Alpine mountains above 3000 m
- Coordinates: 46°34′37.7″N 8°43′40.7″E

Geography
- Location within Switzerland
- Location: Graubünden/Ticino, Switzerland
- Parent range: Lepontine Alps

Piz Blas is a mountain in the Lepontine Alps, located on the border between the cantons of Graubünden and Ticino. At 3,019 metres above sea level, Piz Blas is the highest mountain of Val Cadlimo (Ticino), a valley drained by the Reno da Medel, a tributary of the Rhine. On its northern side (Graubünden), it overlooks the valleys of Lake Curnera and Lake Nalps, both drained by tributaries of the Rhine.
