= Piz Muraun =

Mountain in Switzerland

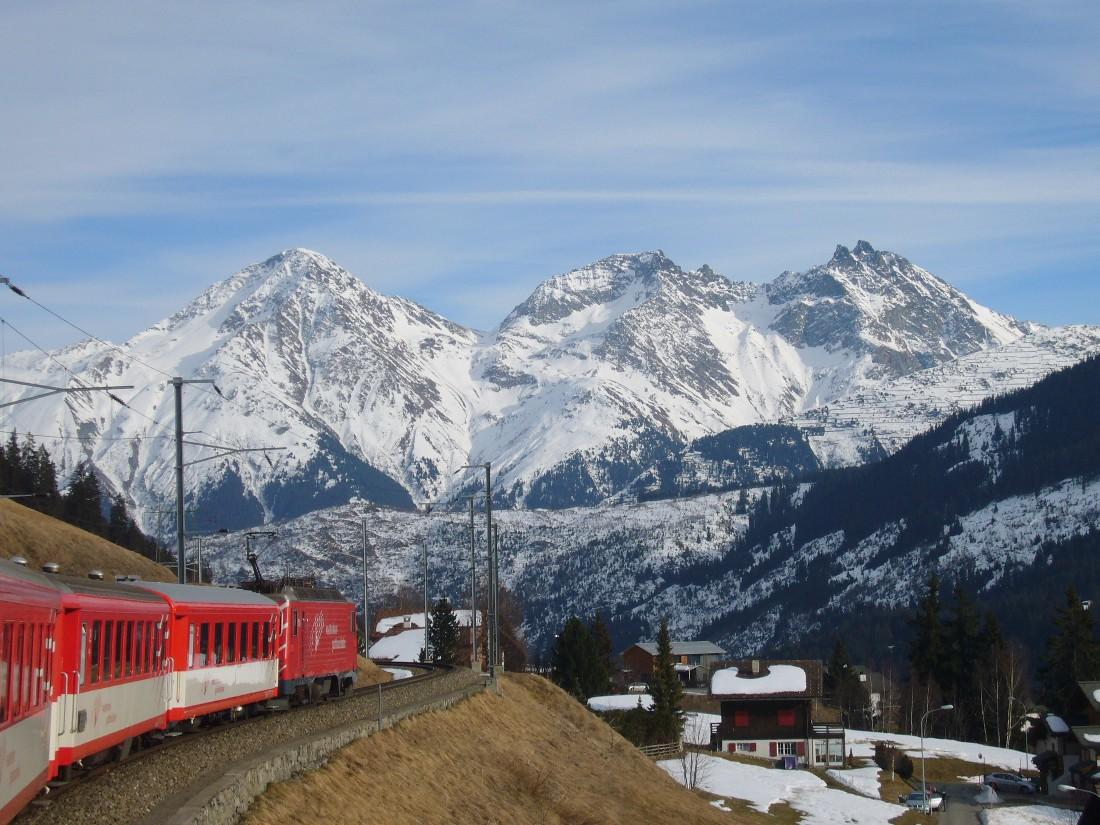
- Piz Muraun (lef) from the west side

Highest point
- Elevation: 2,897 m (9,505 ft)
- Prominence: 268 m (879 ft)
- Parent peak: Piz Miez
- Coordinates: 46°40′17.9″N 8°54′20.4″E

Geography
- Location within Switzerland
- Location: Graubünden, Switzerland
- Parent range: Lepontine Alps

Piz Muraun is a mountain of the Swiss Lepontine Alps, located near Disentis in the canton of Graubünden. It lies between the Val Medel and the Val Sumvitg.
