= Piz Gannaretsch =

Mountain in Switzerland

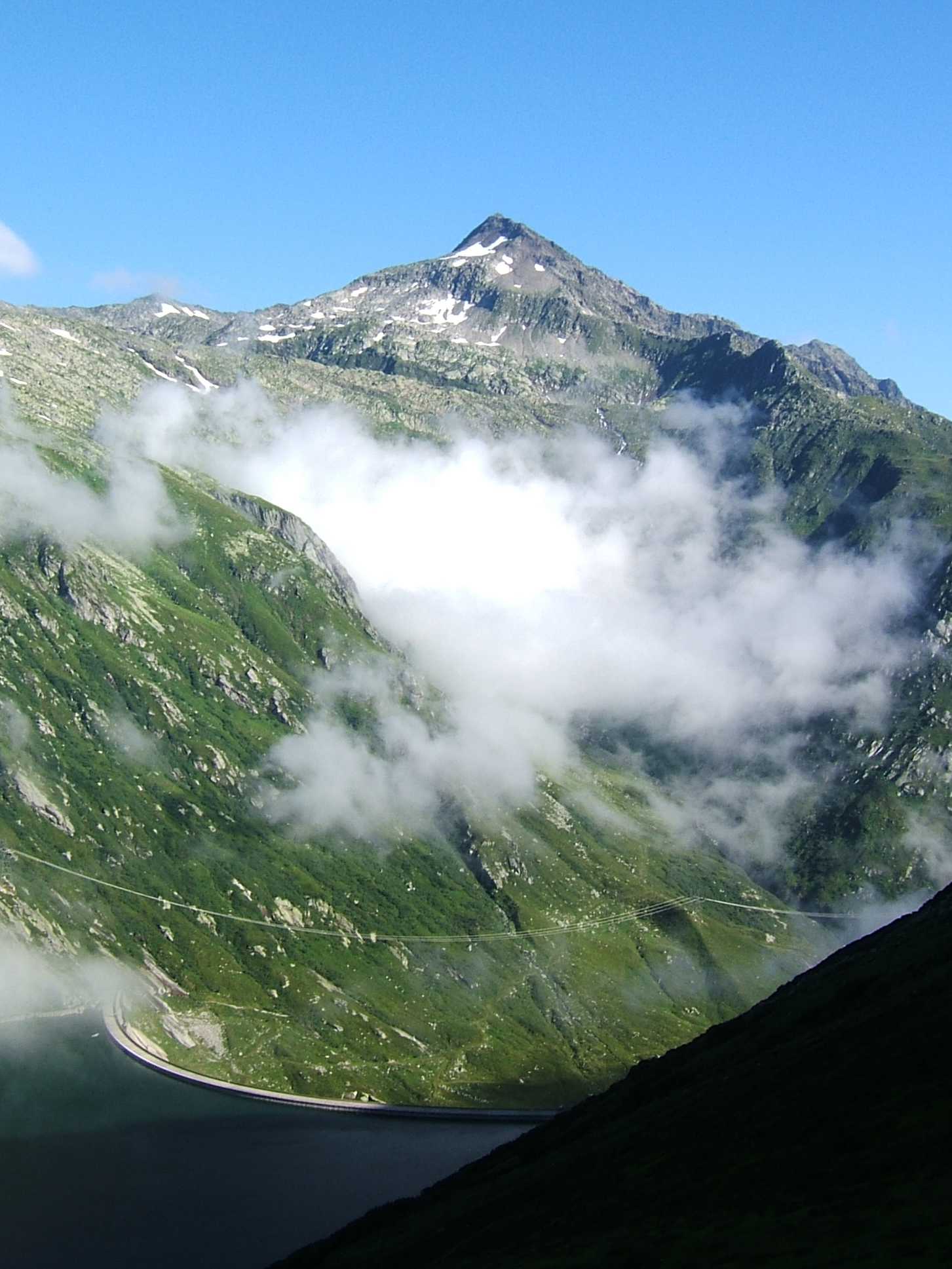
- Piz Gannaretsch from Lai da Sontga Maria

Highest point
- Elevation: 3,040 m (9,970 ft)
- Prominence: 933 m (3,061 ft)
- Parent peak: Finsteraarhorn
- Listing: Alpine mountains above 3000 m
- Coordinates: 46°36′43.3″N 8°47′11.2″E

Geography
- Location within Switzerland
- Location: Graubünden, Switzerland
- Parent range: Lepontine Alps

Piz Gannaretsch is a mountain in the Lepontine Alps, overlooking Sedrun in Graubünden. At 3,040 metres above sea level, its summit is the highest point of the range lying between St Gotthard Pass and Lukmanier Pass. The massif of Piz Gannaretsch separates the valleys of Lake Nalps (west) and Lake Sontga Maria (east).

A glacier named Glatscher da Gannaretsch lies over the north-western flanks of Piz Gannaretsch.
