= Blenio District =

Coordinates: 46°27′20″N 8°56′18″E

Blenio District Distretto di Blenio
- District
- Country: Switzerland
- Canton: Ticino
- Capital: Acquarossa

Area
  - Total: 360.74 km^{2} (139.28 sq mi)

Population (2020)
  - Total: 5,656
  - Density: 15.68/km^{2} (40.61/sq mi)
- Time zone: UTC+1 (CET)
  - Summer (DST): UTC+2 (CEST)
- Municipalities: 3

The Blenio District is a district of the canton of Ticino in Switzerland. It has a population of 5,656 (as of 31 December 2020). The capital of the district is Acquarossa.

== Geography ==
The district has an area, as of 1997, of 360.74 square kilometers (139.28 sq mi). Of this area, 13.19 km^{2} (5.09 sq mi) or 3.7% is used for agricultural purposes, while 133.15 km^{2} (51.41 sq mi) or 36.9% is forested. Of the rest of the land, 6.4 km^{2} (2.5 sq mi) or 1.8% is settled (buildings or roads), 5.75 km^{2} (2.22 sq mi) or 1.6% is either rivers or lakes and 143.3 km^{2} (55.3 sq mi) or 39.7% is unproductive land.

Of the built up area, housing and buildings made up 0.9% and transportation infrastructure made up 0.6%. Out of the forested land, 27.0% of the total land area is heavily forested and 2.6% is covered with orchards or small clusters of trees. Of the agricultural land, 2.5% is used for growing crops. Of the water in the district, 0.4% is in lakes and 1.2% is in rivers and streams. Of the unproductive areas, 18.1% is unproductive vegetation and 21.6% is too rocky for vegetation.

== Demographics ==
Of the Swiss national languages (as of 2000), 301 speak German, 78 people speak French, 4,716 people speak Italian, and 10 people speak Romansh. The remainder (182 people) speak another language.

As of 2008, the gender distribution of the population was 50.2% male and 49.8% female. The population was made up of 2,609 Swiss men (45.9% of the population), and 245 (4.3%) non-Swiss men. There were 2,631 Swiss women (46.3%), and 197 (3.5%) non-Swiss women.

In 2008 there were 49 live births to Swiss citizens and births to non-Swiss citizens, and in same time span there were 70 deaths of Swiss citizens and 2 non-Swiss citizen deaths. Ignoring immigration and emigration, the population of Swiss citizens decreased by 21 while the foreign population decreased by 2. There were 3 Swiss men who immigrated back to Switzerland and 1 Swiss woman who emigrated from Switzerland. At the same time, there were 14 non-Swiss men and 12 non-Swiss women who immigrated from another country to Switzerland. The total Swiss population change in 2008 (from all sources) was an increase of 14 and the non-Swiss population change was an increase of 11 people. This represents a population growth rate of 0.4%.

The age distribution, as of 2009, in the district is: 523 children or 9.2% of the population are between 0 and 9 years old and 569 teenagers or 10.0% are between 10 and 19. Of the adult population, 539 people or 9.5% of the population are between 20 and 29 years old. 721 people or 12.7% are between 30 and 39, 863 people or 15.2% are between 40 and 49, and 693 people or 12.2% are between 50 and 59. The senior population distribution is 706 people or 12.4% of the population are between 60 and 69 years old, 623 people or 11.0% are between 70 and 79, there are 445 people or 7.8% who are over 80.

In 2000 there were 6,471 single family homes (or 75.8% of the total) out of a total of 8,535 inhabited buildings. There were 1,264 two family buildings (14.8%) and 612 multi-family buildings (7.2%). There were also 188 buildings in the district that were multipurpose buildings (used for both housing and commercial or another purpose).

In 2000 there were 4,642 apartments in the district. The most common apartment size was the 4 room apartment of which there were 1,386. There were 233 single room apartments and 1,174 apartments with five or more rooms. Of these apartments, a total of 2,255 apartments (48.6% of the total) were permanently occupied, while 2,314 apartments (49.8%) were seasonally occupied and 73 apartments (1.6%) were empty.

The historical population is given in the following table:

year	population
1850	7,687
1880	7,209
1900	6,363
1950	5,568
1970	5,152
1980	5,040
1990	5,080
2000	5,287

== Politics ==
In the 2007 federal election the most popular party was the CVP which received 30.81% of the vote. The next three most popular parties were the FDP (28.42%), the SP (15.69%) and the Ticino League (15.29%). In the federal election, a total of 2,112 votes were cast, and the voter turnout was 46.2%.

In the 2007 Ticino Gran Consiglio election, there were a total of 5,182 registered voters in the district, of which 2,874 or 55.5% voted. 51 blank ballots and 5 null ballots were cast, leaving 2,818 valid ballots in the election. The most popular party was the PLRT which received 656 or 23.3% of the vote. The next three most popular parties were; the PPD+GenGiova (with 605 or 21.5%), the SSI (with 474 or 16.8%) and the PS (with 472 or 16.7%).

In the 2007 Ticino Consiglio di Stato election, 31 blank ballots and 7 null ballots were cast, leaving 2,835 valid ballots in the election. The most popular party was the PLRT which received 609 or 21.5% of the vote. The next three most popular parties were; the LEGA (with 596 or 21.0%), the PPD (with 587 or 20.7%) and the PS (with 525 or 18.5%).

== Religion ==
From the 2000 census, 4,422 or 83.6% were Catholic, while 184 or 3.5% belonged to the Swiss Reformed Church. There are 483 individuals (or about 9.14% of the population) who belong to another church (not listed on the census), and 198 individuals (or about 3.75% of the population) did not answer the question.

== Education ==
In the district there were a total of 902 students (as of 2009). The Ticino education system provides up to three years of non-mandatory kindergarten and in the district there were 136 children in kindergarten. The primary school program lasts for five years and includes both a standard school and a special school. In the district, 270 students attended the standard primary schools and 13 students attended the special school. In the lower secondary school system, students either attend a two-year middle school followed by a two-year pre-apprenticeship or they attend a four-year program to prepare for higher education. There were 244 students in the two-year middle school and 0 in their pre-apprenticeship, while 58 students were in the four-year advanced program.

The upper secondary school includes several options, but at the end of the upper secondary program, a student will be prepared to enter a trade or to continue on to a university or college. In Ticino, vocational students may either attend school while working on their internship or apprenticeship (which takes three or four years) or may attend school followed by an internship or apprenticeship (which takes one year as a full-time student or one and a half to two years as a part-time student). There were 37 vocational students who were attending school full-time and 128 who attend part-time.

The professional program lasts three years and prepares a student for a job in engineering, nursing, computer science, business, tourism and similar fields. There were 16 students in the professional program.

== Circles and municipalities ==
Circolo di Malvaglia
Coat of arms	Municipality	Population (31 December 2020)	Area km^{2}
Serravalle	Serravalle	2,079	96.8
	Total	2,079	96.8

Circolo di Acquarossa
Coat of arms	Municipality	Population (31 December 2020)	Area km^{2}
Acquarossa	Acquarossa	1,807	61.59
	Total	1,807	61.59

Circolo di Olivone
Coat of arms	Municipality	Population (31 December 2020)	Area km^{2}
Blenio	Blenio	1,770	202.06
	Total	1,770	202.06

== Mergers ==
- In 2004 Acquarossa was created by a merger of Castro, Corzoneso, Dongio, Largario, Leontica, Lottigna, Ponto Valentino and Prugiasco.
- In 2006 the municipality of Blenio was formed from: Aquila, Campo Blenio, Ghirone, Olivone.
- In 2012 the municipality of Serravalle was formed from : Malvaglia, Semione and Ludiano.
