= Sosto =

Mountain in Switzerland

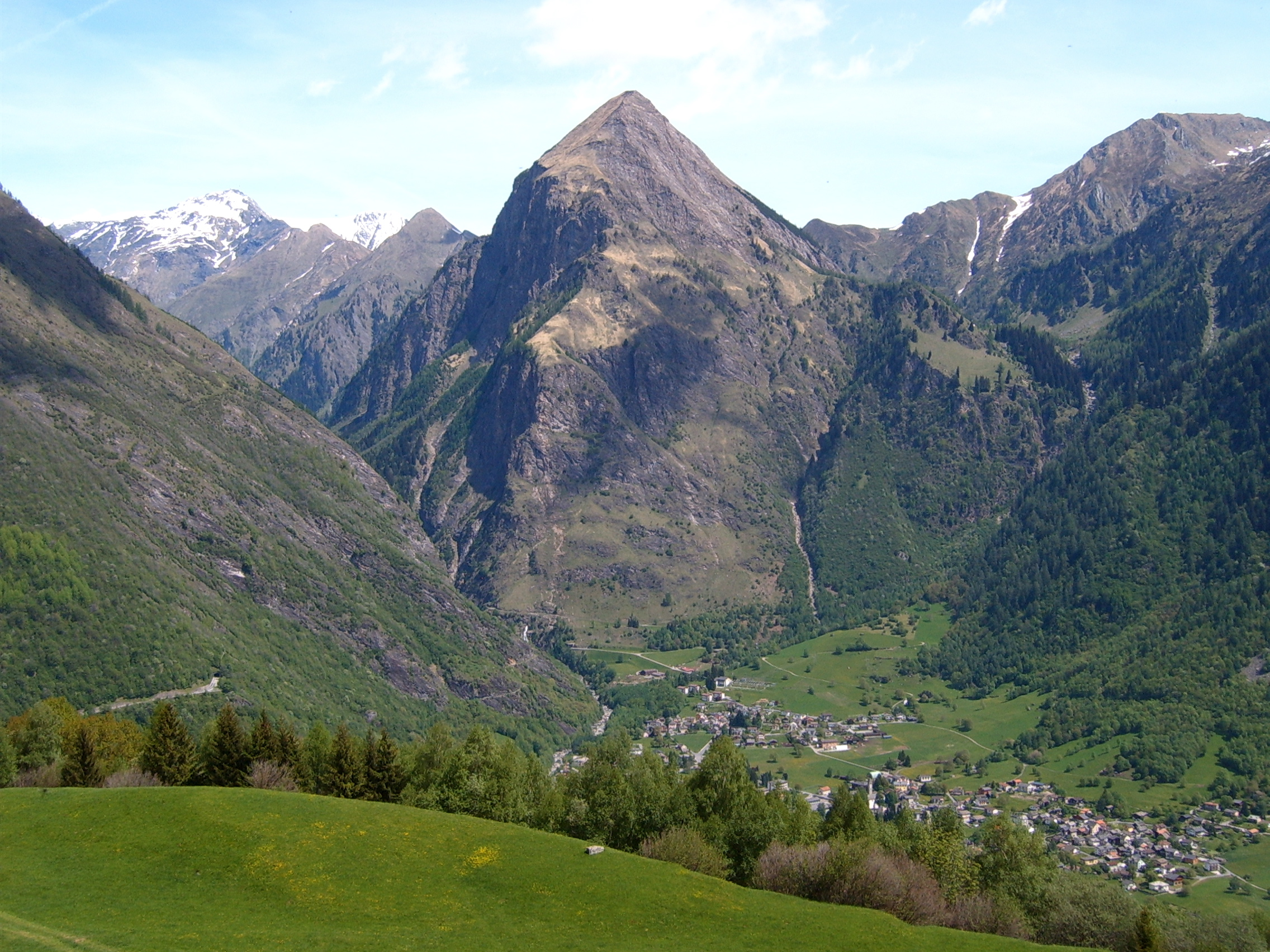
- View from the south side

Highest point
- Elevation: 2,221 m (7,287 ft)
- Prominence: 524 m (1,719 ft)
- Coordinates: 46°32′54.3″N 8°57′07.1″E

Geography
- Location within Switzerland
- Location: Ticino, Switzerland
- Parent range: Lepontine Alps

The Sosto (2,220.6 m) is a mountain of the Swiss Lepontine Alps, overlooking Olivone in the canton of Ticino. It lies south of the lake of Luzzone and west of the Torrone di Nav.
