= Greina =

Mountain pass in Switzerland

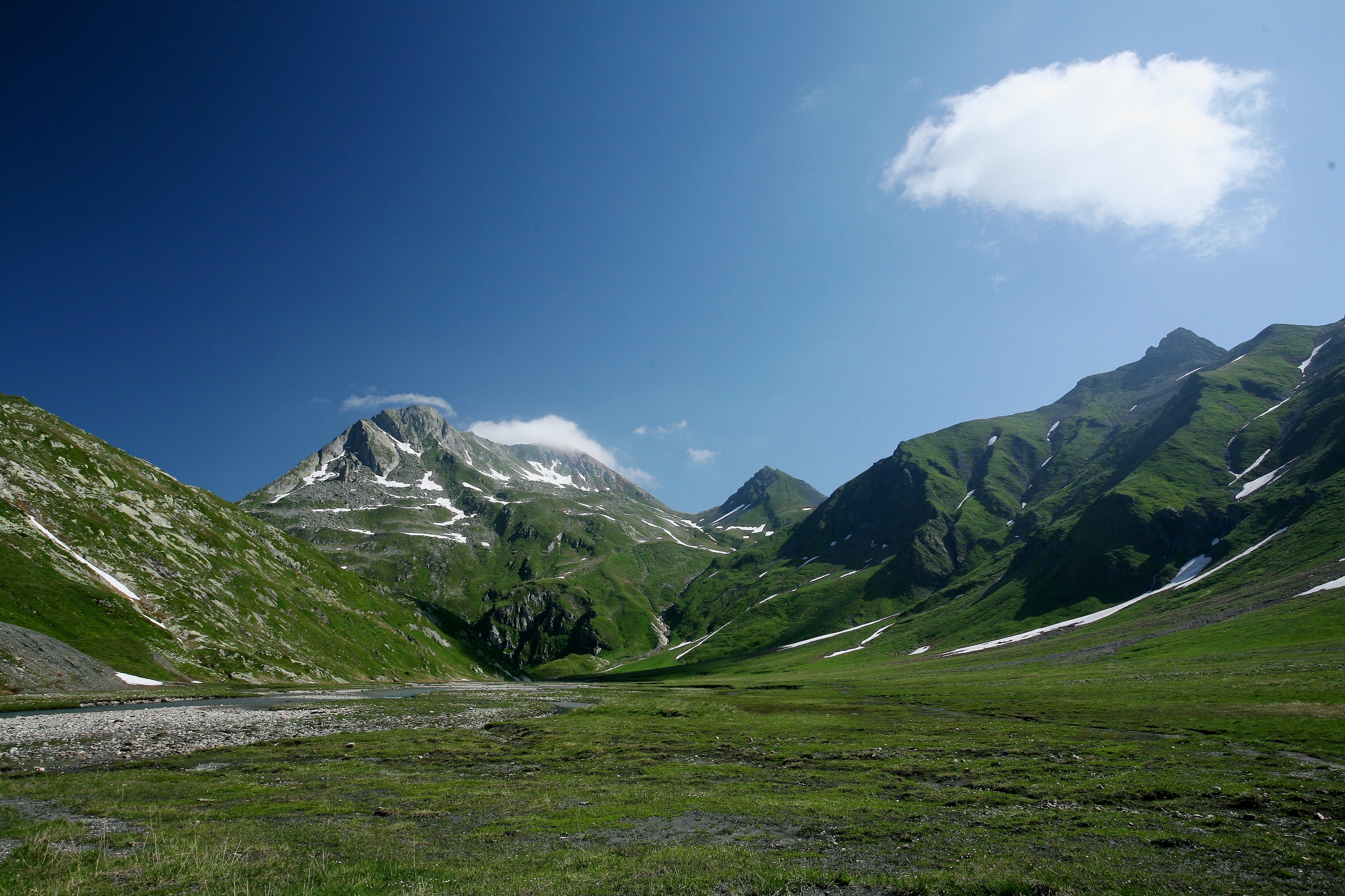
- Plaun la Greina
- Interactive map of Greina
- Elevation: 2,355 metres (7,726 ft)
- Traversed by: Trail

Third Approach
- Location: Switzerland
- Range: Alps
- Coordinates: 46°36′45″N 8°57′38″E

The Greina (el. 2355 m.) (Italian: Passo della Greina, Romansh: Pass Crap) is a high mountain pass across the western Lepontine Alps, connecting Sumvitg in the canton of Graubünden in Switzerland and Olivone in the canton of Ticino. The pass lies between the Piz Medel on the north and Pizzo Marumo, Piz Terri on the south.

Greina is also a high plateau (Plaun la Greina) lying east of the pass, it is an alluvial site of national importance. The high plateau was in high risk of being flooded for a reservoir for many years. In the end this led to recompensation for the municipitalities of Vrin and Sumvitg as they have no income from this formerly planned powerplant. This compensation called Landschaftsrappen is augmented by a tax for powerplants.

== See also ==
- List of mountain passes in Switzerland
