= Piz Medel =

Mountain in Switzerland

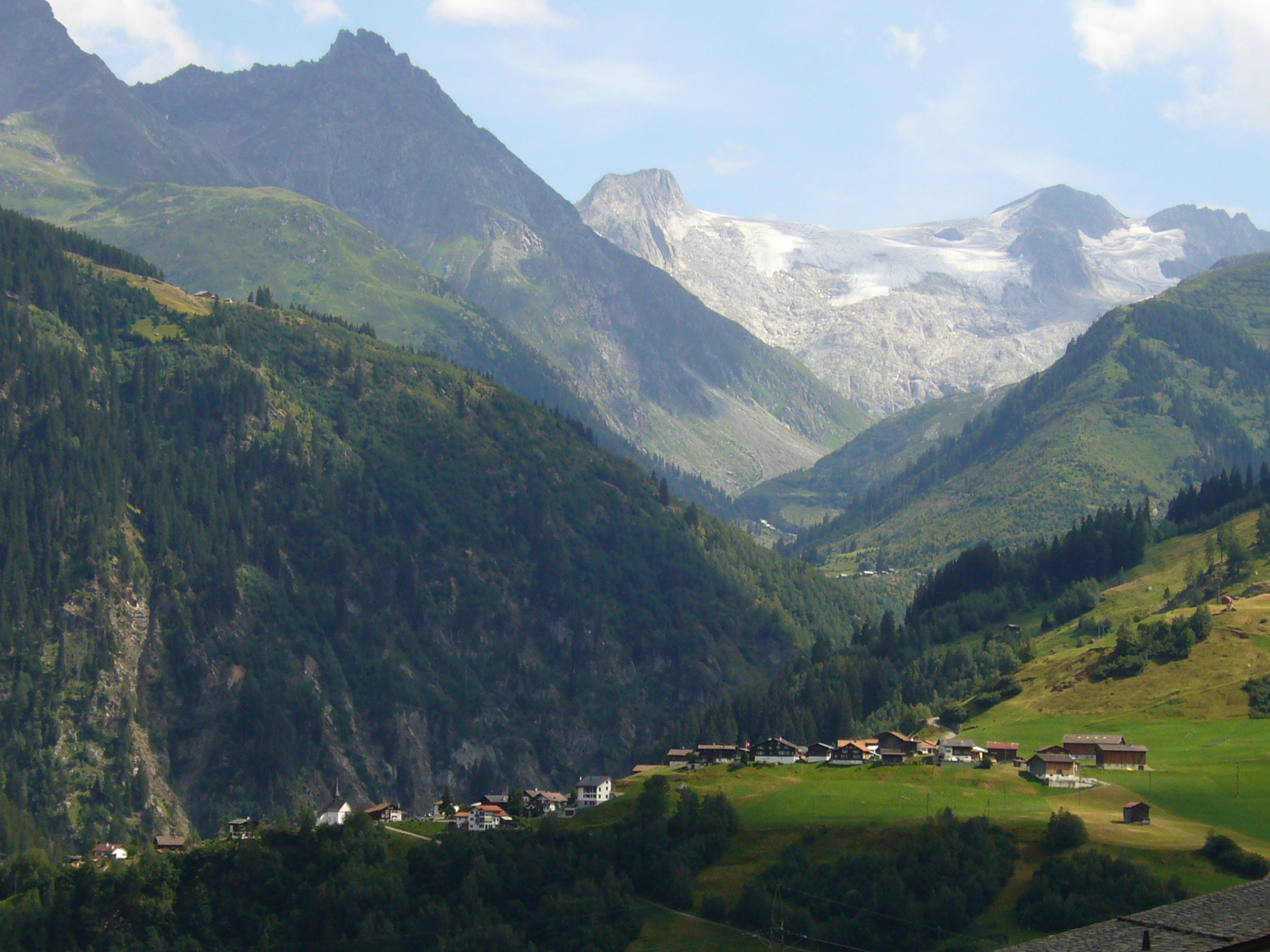
- Piz Medel (summit on the right) from the north side

Highest point
- Elevation: 3,210 m (10,530 ft)
- Prominence: 942 m (3,091 ft)
- Parent peak: Rheinwaldhorn
- Isolation: 15.4 km (9.6 mi)
- Listing: Alpine mountains above 3000 m
- Coordinates: 46°37′5.4″N 8°54′40″E

Geography
- Location within Switzerland
- Location: Graubünden/Ticino, Switzerland
- Parent range: Lepontine Alps

Piz Medel is a mountain in the Lepontine Alps, located on the border between the cantons of Ticino and Graubünden. At 3,210 metres (10,531 ft) above sea level it is the highest summit on the chain between Lukmanier Pass (1,915 metres) and Crap la Crusch (2,268 metres). The mountain overlooks the Greina, an important pass connecting the cantons of Graubünden and Ticino.

The northern side of the massif (Graubünden) is covered by a large glacier named Glatscher da Medel, separated on its lower part in three branches. The massif consists of several summits among which the highest are Piz a Spescha (3,109 metres), Piz Cristallina (3,128 metres), Piz Uffiern (3,151 metres) and Cima di Camadra (3,172 metres).

The normal route to the summit starts at Fuorcla da Lavaz (2,524 metres), a pass connecting the northern valleys of Medel and Sumvitg. A hut has been erected on the pass by the Swiss Alpine Club, the Medel hut.

== See also ==
- List of mountains of Graubünden
- List of mountains of Ticino
- List of most isolated mountains of Switzerland
