= Lukmanier Pass =

Mountain pass in the Lepontine Alps, Switzerland

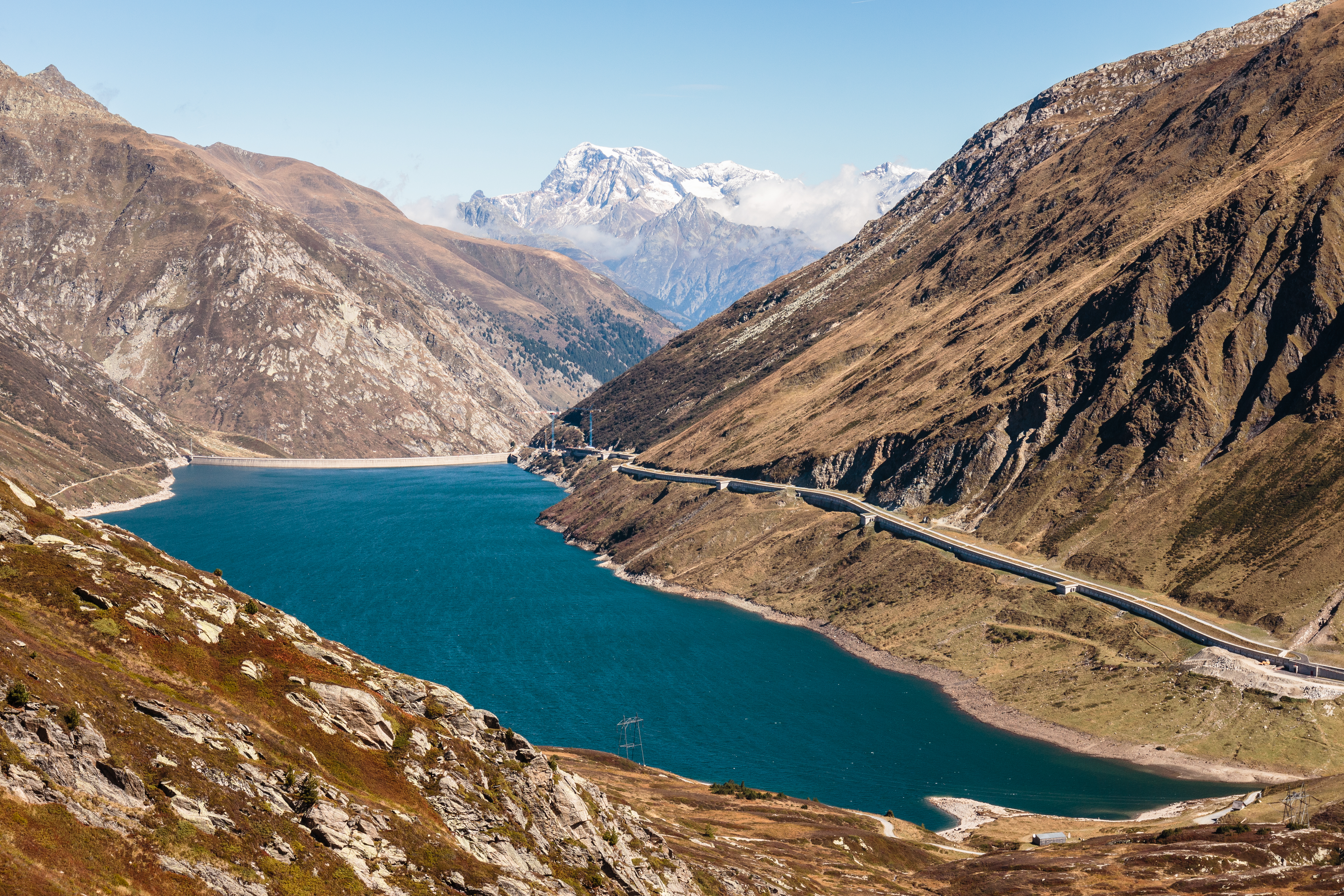
- Lukmanier Pass in 2022

- Location within Switzerland Location within Canton of Graubünden Location within Canton of Ticino
- Elevation: 1,915 metres (6,283 ft)

Third Approach
- Location: Graubünden/Ticino, Switzerland
- Range: Lepontine Alps
- Coordinates: 46°33′46″N 8°48′03″E

Lukmanier Pass (Italian: Passo del Lucomagno, Romansh: Cuolm Lucmagn) is a pass in the Swiss Alps.

The road from Disentis/Mustér in the canton of Graubünden leads through the Val Medel across the pass to the Blenio Valley and Biasca in the canton of Ticino. North of the pass, the road runs along the east shore of Lake Sontga Maria. The highest elevation reached by the road is 1973 m, in the 2 km long Lukmanier tunnel running along the lake. However, the pass is marked at the southern exit from the tunnel, on the site of the Lukmanier Hospice, at an elevation of 1915 m.

The pass is kept open during the winter but even then, it often closes after 18:00 hours (6:00 p.m.).

Below the Lukmanier Pass, or more precisely between it and Pizzo dell'Uomo, runs the Gotthard Base Tunnel.

== See also ==
- List of highest paved roads in Switzerland
- List of highest road passes in Switzerland
- List of mountain passes in Switzerland
