= Medel (Lucmagn) =

- Municipality
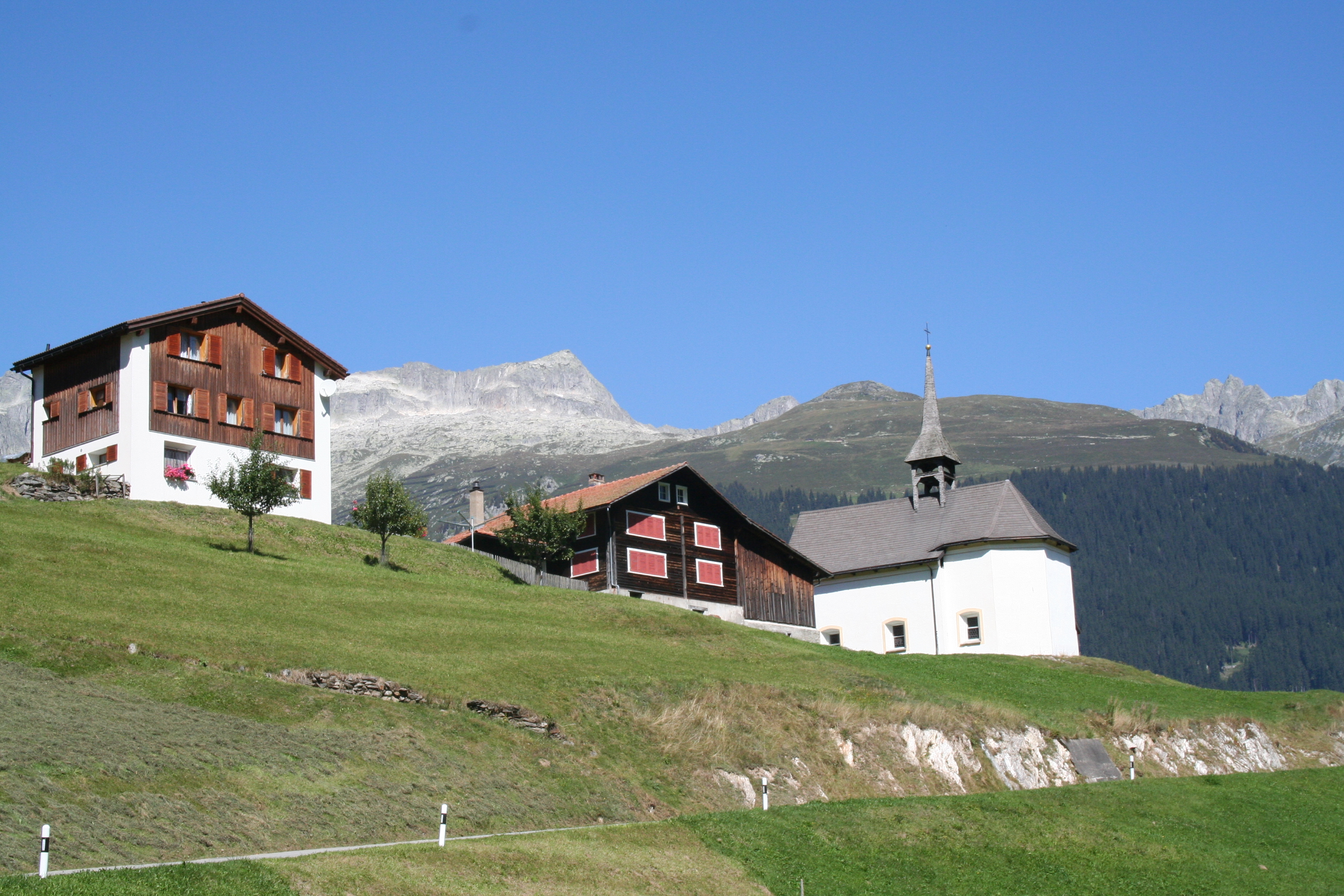
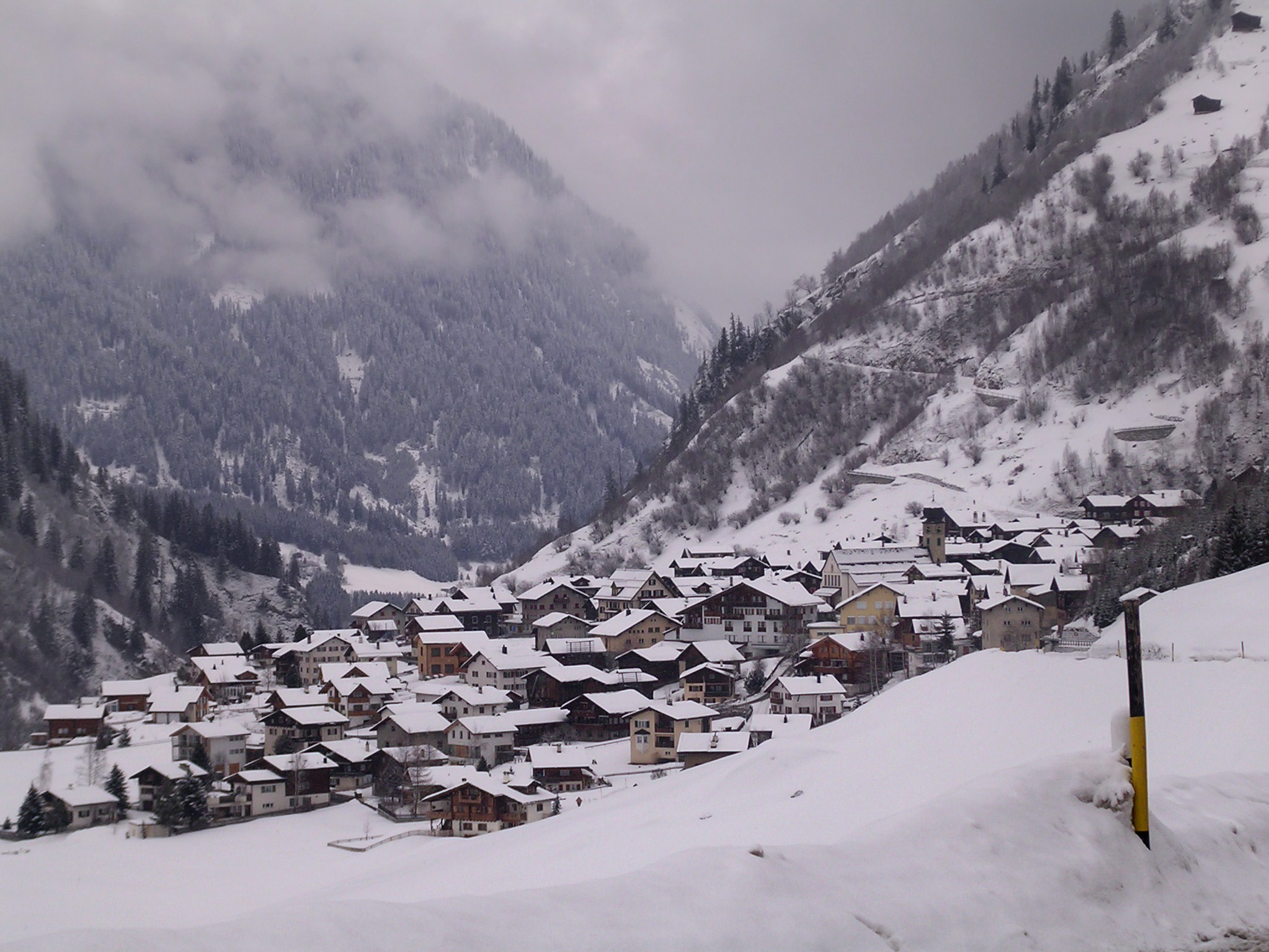
- Curaglia

- Flag Coat of arms
- Location of Medel (Lucmagn)
- Location within Switzerland Location within Canton of Grisons
- Coordinates: 46°38′N 8°50′E
- Country: Switzerland
- Canton: Grisons
- District: Surselva

Area
  - Total: 136.20 km^{2} (52.59 sq mi)
- Elevation: 1,332 m (4,370 ft)

Population (December 2020)
  - Total: 344
  - Density: 2.53/km^{2} (6.54/sq mi)
- Time zone: UTC+01:00 (CET)
  - Summer (DST): UTC+02:00 (CEST)
- Postal code: 7184
- SFOS number: 3983
- ISO 3166 code: CH-GR
- Localities: Curaglia, Platta
- Surrounded by: Blenio (TI), Disentis/Mustér, Quinto (TI), Sumvitg, Tujetsch, Vrin
- Website: www.medel.ch

Medel (Romansh pronunciation: [ˈmɛːdəl]) is a municipality in the Surselva Region in the Swiss canton of the Grisons.

== History ==
Medel (Lucmagn) is first mentioned in 1315 as de valle Mederis.

== Geography ==
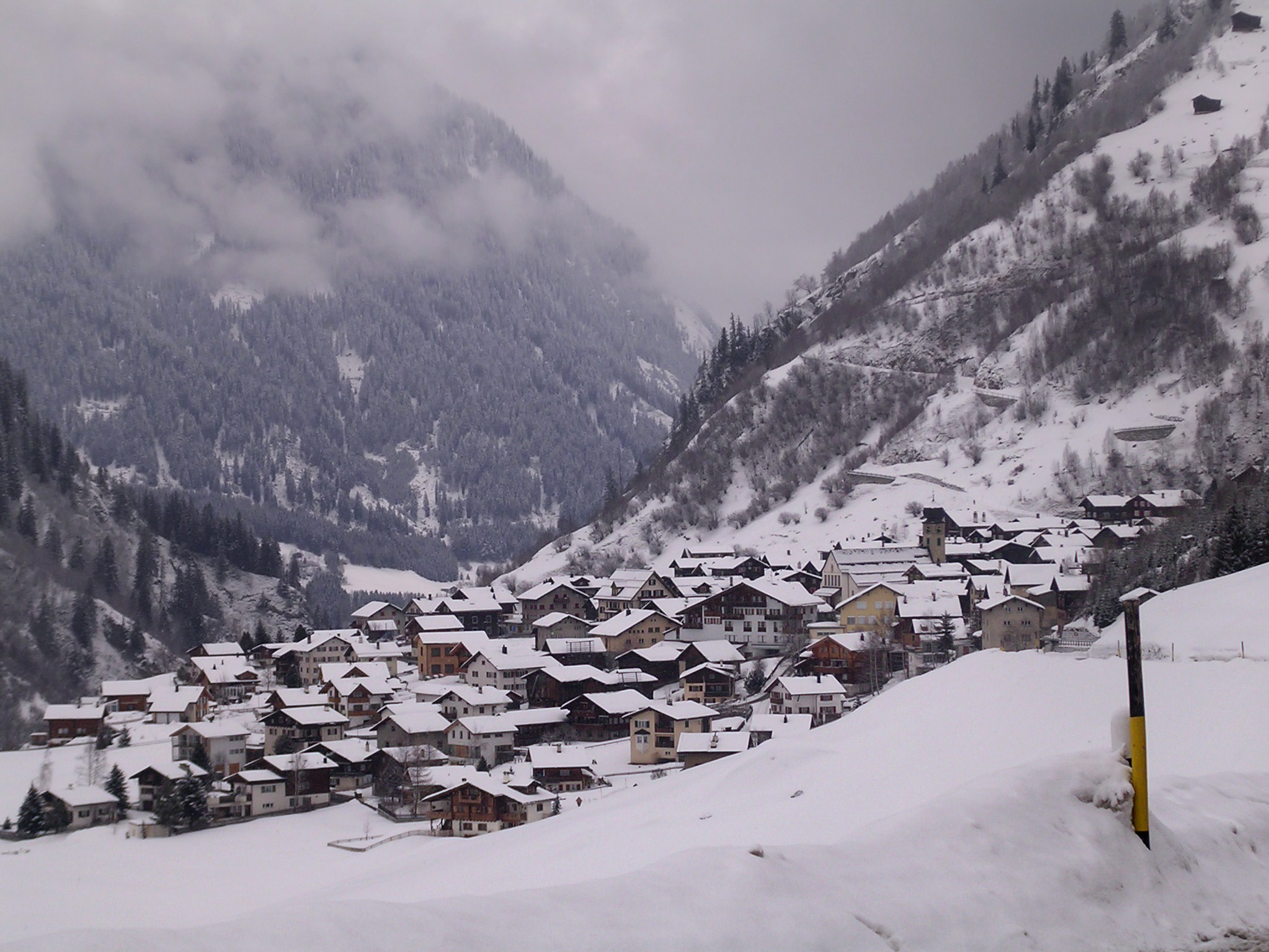
Curaglia village

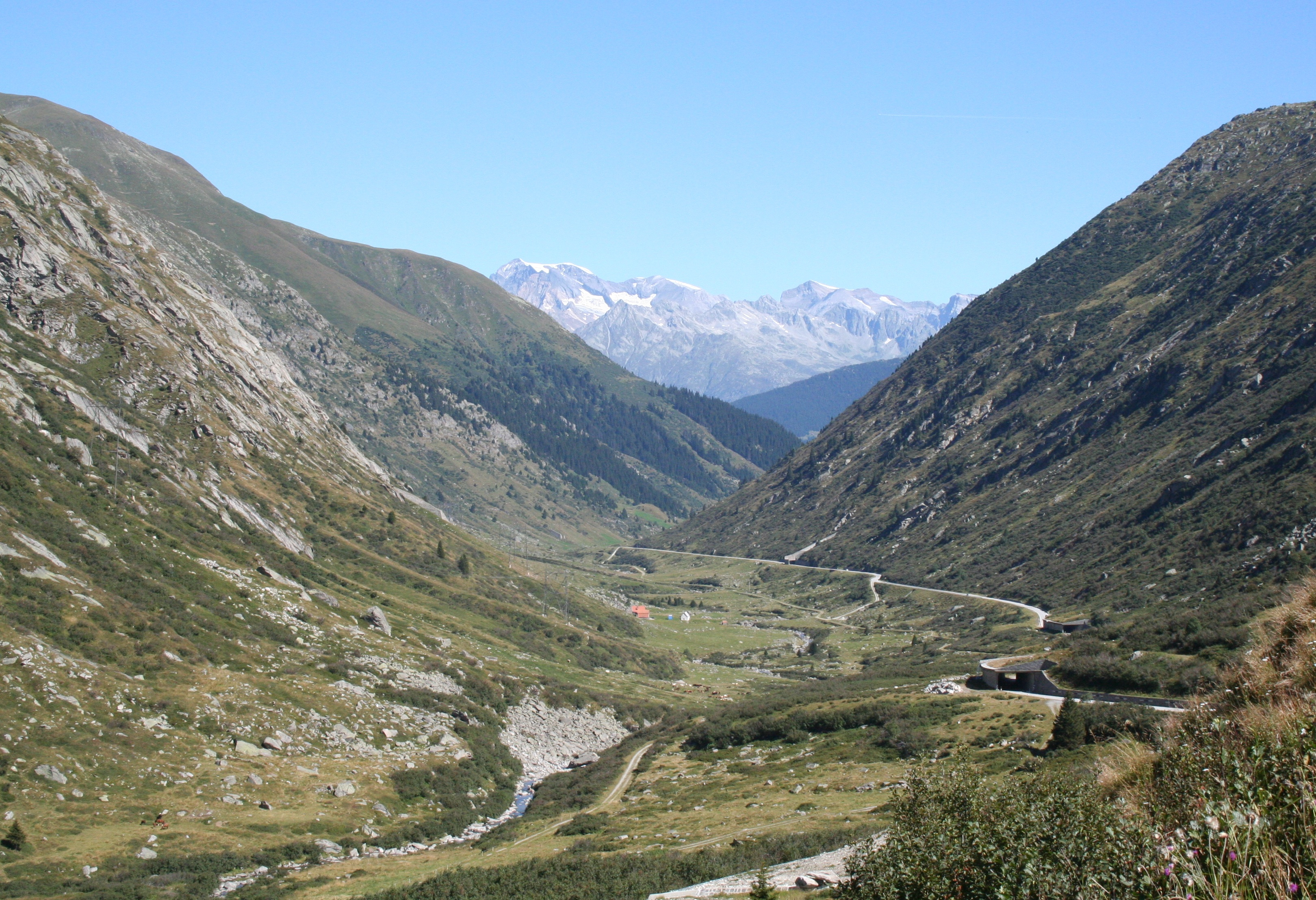
Medel Valley, looking north

Aerial view (1954)

Medel (Lucmagn) has an area, as of 2006, of 136.2 km^{2} (52.6 sq mi). Of this area, 17.8% is used for agricultural purposes, while 14.9% is forested. Of the rest of the land, 0.6% is settled (buildings or roads) and the remainder (66.8%) is non-productive (rivers, glaciers or mountains).

Before 2017, the municipality was located in the Disentis sub-district of the Surselva district, after 2017 it was part of the Surselva Region. It is located in the Medelserrhein river basin. It includes the 16 km (9.9 mi) long Medel Valley, which connects Upper Grisons with the canton of Ticino. It consists of a number of settlements at an elevation of 1,332–1,621 meters (4,370–5,318 ft). These include: Curaglia (main village), Soliva, Mutschnengia, Platta, Drual/Matergia, Pardé, Fuorns and S. Gions. The municipality also includes about 50 abandoned farm houses and summer herding camps, including Pali, Biscuolm and Casura. Until 1943 Medel (Lucmagn) was known as Medels im Oberland.

== Demographics ==
Medel (Lucmagn) has a population (as of 31 December 2020) of 344. As of 2008, 1.6% of the population was made up of foreign nationals. Over the last 10 years the population has decreased at a rate of -10.1%. Most of the population (as of 2000) speaks Romansh (92.8%), with German being second most common (5.7%) and Italian third (0.4%).

As of 2000, the gender distribution of the population was 48.4% male and 51.6% female. The age distribution, as of 2000, in Medel (Lucmagn) is; 74 children or 15.7% of the population are between 0 and 9 years old and 47 teenagers or 10.0% are between 10 and 19. Of the adult population, 21 people or 4.5% of the population are between 20 and 29 years old. 79 people or 16.8% are between 30 and 39, 52 people or 11.1% are between 40 and 49, and 31 people or 6.6% are between 50 and 59. The senior population distribution is 58 people or 12.3% of the population are between 60 and 69 years old, 69 people or 14.7% are between 70 and 79, there are 33 people or 7.0% who are between 80 and 89 there are 6 people or 1.3% who are between 90 and 99.

In the 2007 federal election the most popular party was the CVP which received 67% of the vote. The next three most popular parties were the SVP (19.4%), the SP (10%) and the FDP (3.6%).

In Medel (Lucmagn) about 53.7% of the population (between age 25–64) have completed either non-mandatory upper secondary education or additional higher education (either university or a Fachhochschule).

Medel (Lucmagn) has an unemployment rate of 0.7%. As of 2005, there were 85 people employed in the primary economic sector and about 37 businesses involved in this sector. 13 people are employed in the secondary sector and there are 5 businesses in this sector. 57 people are employed in the tertiary sector, with 16 businesses in this sector.

The historical population is given in the following table:

year	population
1850	609
1900	536
1950	614
1960	835
2000	470
