= Osco, Leventina =

Osco
- Former municipality
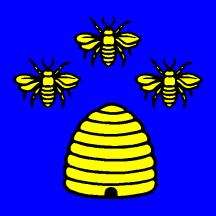
- Flag Coat of arms
- Location of Osco
- Location within Switzerland Location within Canton of Ticino
- Coordinates: 46°30′N 8°47′E
- Country: Switzerland
- Canton: Ticino
- District: Leventina

Area
  - Total: 11.9 km^{2} (4.6 sq mi)
- Elevation: 1,157 m (3,796 ft)

Population (December 2004)
  - Total: 111
  - Density: 9.33/km^{2} (24.2/sq mi)
- Time zone: UTC+01:00 (CET)
  - Summer (DST): UTC+02:00 (CEST)
- Postal code: 6763
- SFOS number: 5075
- ISO 3166 code: CH-TI
- Surrounded by: Blenio, Dalpe, Mairengo, Prato (Leventina), Quinto
- Website: www.osco.ch

Osco is a former municipality in the district of Leventina in the canton of Ticino in Switzerland. On 1 April 2012, it was incorporated into the municipality of Faido along with the former municipalities of Anzonico, Calpiogna, Campello, Cavagnago, Chironico and Mairengo.

== History ==
Osco is first mentioned in 1171 as Hoscho. In 1237 it was mentioned as Osco. Golasecca culture (6th century BC) graves have been discovered in Freggio and Brusgnano. Osco was one of the three Degagne of the Vicinanza of Faido. This organization was mentioned in the Statute (Statuti) of 1237, one of the oldest documents of its kind in the Alpine region, which involved the organization of pass traffic and maintenance of roads.

The Church of San Maurizio was first mentioned in 1171, but the church's present appearance dates back to 1673. Until 1602 it was under the authority of the parish church of San Siro in Mairengo. After that, Osco was an independent parish.

The mule track over the Gotthard pass, led by the southern part of Osco and crossed the Monte Piottino gorge near the old Sust or storage house, which is now only ruins. After 1550, the Canton of Uri built a new road. The Cantonal road of 1819 followed the old mule path and was replaced by a tunnel, completed in 1934.

The residents of Osco lived mostly off livestock and alpine pastures in the Bedretto valley (Alp Cruina) on the north side of the Lukmanier pass. From the mid-19th century onwards, the population decreases rapidly, because of emigration (mostly as cooks, assistants, farmers and hoteliers). With the construction of second homes, at the beginning of the 20th century, the decline has been only partially stopped. In 2005, 62% of the population worked in agriculture.

In 2004 voters rejected a merger with Faido and other municipalities of the middle Levantine.

== Geography ==
Aerial view (1954)

Osco has an area, as of 1997, of 11.9 square kilometers (4.6 sq mi). Of this area, 0.57 km^{2} (0.22 sq mi) or 4.8% is used for agricultural purposes, while 6.37 km^{2} (2.46 sq mi) or 53.5% is forested. Of the rest of the land, 0.31 km^{2} (0.12 sq mi) or 2.6% is settled (buildings or roads), 0.24 km^{2} (0.093 sq mi) or 2.0% is either rivers or lakes and 2.59 km^{2} (1.00 sq mi) or 21.8% is unproductive land.

Of the built up area, housing and buildings made up 0.5% and transportation infrastructure made up 1.8%. Out of the forested land, 46.4% of the total land area is heavily forested and 2.3% is covered with orchards or small clusters of trees. Of the agricultural land, 4.3% is used for growing crops. Of the water in the municipality, 0.9% is in lakes and 1.1% is in rivers and streams. Of the unproductive areas, 11.7% is unproductive vegetation and 10.1% is too rocky for vegetation.

The municipality is located in the Leventina district, at en elevation of 1,157 m (3,796 ft) on the left side of the Leventina valley. It is on a terrace above the Monte Piottino canyon. It consists of the village of Osco which is made up of the sections of Vigera, Brusgnano and Freggio.

== Coat of arms ==
The blazon of the municipal coat of arms is Azure three bees one and two above a bee-hive all Or. The bees symbolize the activity of its people carrying goods over Gottard pass, which was very important in the economic life in those days, as reported by the statutes dated 1237.

== Demographics ==
Osco has a population (as of December 2020) of 127. As of 2008, 7.2% of the population are resident foreign nationals. Over the last 10 years (1997–2007) the population has changed at a rate of -3.8%.

Most of the population (as of 2000) speaks Italian (94.6%), with Serbo-Croatian being second most common ( 2.4%) and German being third (0.6%). Of the Swiss national languages (as of 2000), 1 speaks German, 1 person speaks French and 159 people speak Italian. The remainder (7 people) speak another language.

As of 2008, the gender distribution of the population was 53.0% male and 47.0% female. The population was made up of 64 Swiss men (48.5% of the population), and 6 (4.5%) non-Swiss men. There were 60 Swiss women (45.5%), and 2 (1.5%) non-Swiss women. In 2008 there was 1 live birth and 2 deaths of Swiss citizens. Ignoring immigration and emigration, the population of Swiss citizens decreased by 1 while the foreign population remained the same. The total Swiss population change in 2008 (from all sources) was a decrease of 2 and the non-Swiss population change was an increase of 1 people. This represents a population growth rate of -0.8%.

The age distribution, as of 2009, in Osco is; 10 children or 7.6% of the population are between 0 and 9 years old and 7 teenagers or 5.3% are between 10 and 19. Of the adult population, 11 people or 8.3% of the population are between 20 and 29 years old. 29 people or 22.0% are between 30 and 39, 9 people or 6.8% are between 40 and 49, and 12 people or 9.1% are between 50 and 59. The senior population distribution is 27 people or 20.5% of the population are between 60 and 69 years old, 9 people or 6.8% are between 70 and 79, there are 18 people or 13.6% who are over 80.

As of 2000 the average number of residents per living room was 0.48 which is fewer people per room than the cantonal average of 0.6 per room. In this case, a room is defined as space of a housing unit of at least 4 m^{2} (43 sq ft) as normal bedrooms, dining rooms, living rooms, kitchens and habitable cellars and attics. About 72.1% of the total households were owner occupied, or in other words did not pay rent (though they may have a mortgage or a rent-to-own agreement).

As of 2000, there were 43 private households in the municipality, and an average of 2. persons per household. In 2000 there were 167 single family homes (or 85.6% of the total) out of a total of 195 inhabited buildings. There were 18 two family buildings (9.2%) and 4 multi-family buildings (2.1%). There were also 6 buildings in the municipality that were multipurpose buildings (used for both housing and commercial or another purpose).

The vacancy rate for the municipality, in 2008, was 1.23%. In 2000 there were 217 apartments in the municipality. The most common apartment size was the 5 room apartment of which there were 57. There were 17 single room apartments and 57 apartments with five or more rooms. Of these apartments, a total of 43 apartments (19.8% of the total) were permanently occupied, while 171 apartments (78.8%) were seasonally occupied and 3 apartments (1.4%) were empty. As of 2007, the construction rate of new housing units was 7.9 new units per 1000 residents.

The historical population is given in the following table:

year	population
1237	59 Hearths
1567	78
1745	366
1850	452
1900	285
1950	188
2000	168

== Sights ==
The entire villages of Brusgnano-Freggio and Osco are designated as part of the Inventory of Swiss Heritage Sites

== Politics ==
In the 2007 federal election the most popular party was the FDP which received 33.28% of the vote. The next three most popular parties were the CVP (26.52%), the Ticino League (16.12%) and the SP (12.31%). In the federal election, a total of 75 votes were cast, and the voter turnout was 60.0%.

In the 2007 Gran Consiglio election, there were a total of 125 registered voters in Osco, of which 94 or 75.2% voted.1 null ballot was cast, leaving 93 valid ballots in the election. The most popular party was the PLRT which received 27 or 29.0% of the vote. The next three most popular parties were; the PPD+GenGiova (with 26 or 28.0%), the SSI (with 16 or 17.2%) and the LEGA (with 10 or 10.8%).

In the 2007 Consiglio di Stato election, 1 blank ballot and 2 null ballots were cast, leaving 91 valid ballots in the election. The most popular party was the PLRT which received 25 or 27.5% of the vote. The next three most popular parties were; the PLRT (with 25 or 27.5%), the SSI (with 17 or 18.7%) and the LEGA (with 13 or 14.3%).

== Economy ==
As of 2007, Osco had an unemployment rate of 1.06%. As of 2005, there were 16 people employed in the primary economic sector and about 7 businesses involved in this sector. people were employed in the secondary sector and there were businesses in this sector. 10 people were employed in the tertiary sector, with 5 businesses in this sector. There were 115 residents of the municipality who were employed in some capacity, of which females made up 7.8% of the workforce.

In 2000, there were 96 workers who commuted away from the municipality. Of the working population, 2.6% used public transportation to get to work, and 13.9% used a private car.

As of 2009, there was one hotel in Osco.

== Religion ==
From the 2000 census, 149 or 88.7% were Roman Catholic, while 3 or 1.8% belonged to the Swiss Reformed Church. There are 12 individuals (or about 7.14% of the population) who belong to another church (not listed on the census), and 4 individuals (or about 2.38% of the population) did not answer the question.

== Education ==
In Osco about 53% of the population (between age 25–64) have completed either non-mandatory upper secondary education or additional higher education (either university or a Fachhochschule).

In Osco there were a total of 14 students (as of 2009). The Ticino education system provides up to three years of non-mandatory kindergarten and in Osco there were 2 children in kindergarten. The primary school program lasts for five years and includes both a standard school and a special school. In the municipality, 5 students attended the standard primary schools and 1 student attended the special school. In the lower secondary school system, students either attend a two-year middle school followed by a two-year pre-apprenticeship or they attend a four-year program to prepare for higher education. There were 1 student in the two-year middle school and 0 in their pre-apprenticeship, while 2 students were in the four-year advanced program.

The upper secondary school includes several options, but at the end of the upper secondary program, a student will be prepared to enter a trade or to continue on to a university or college. In Ticino, vocational students may either attend school while working on their internship or apprenticeship (which takes three or four years) or may attend school followed by an internship or apprenticeship (which takes one year as a full-time student or one and a half to two years as a part-time student). There were 0 vocational students who were attending school full-time and 3 who attend part-time.

As of 2000, there were 7 students from Osco who attended schools outside the municipality.
