= Gribbio =

- Former municipality
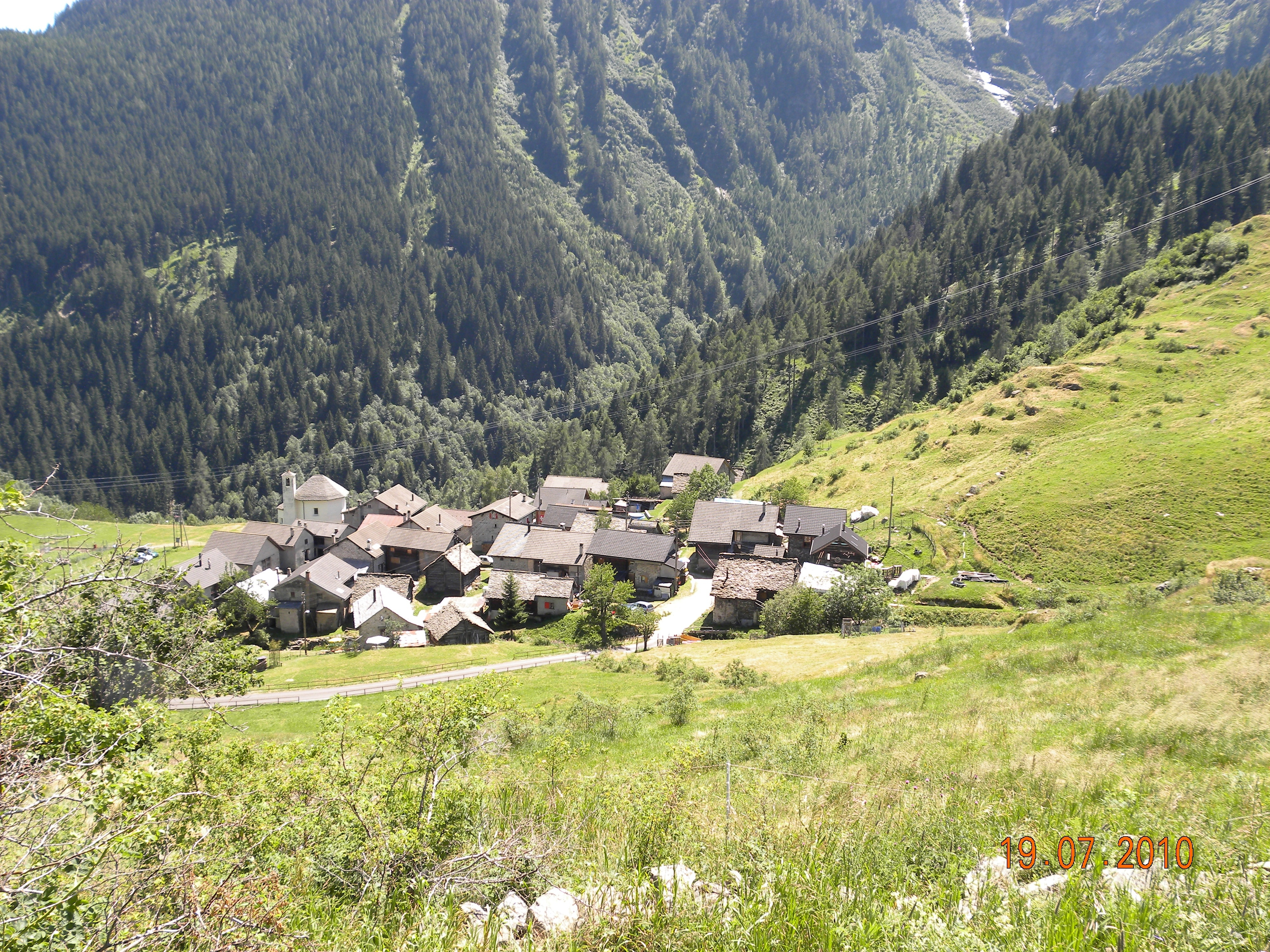
- Gribbio Village

- Coat of arms
- Location of Gribbio
- Location within Switzerland Location within Canton of Ticino
- Coordinates: 46°25′N 8°50′E
- Country: Switzerland
- Canton: Ticino
- District: Leventina

Government
  - Mayor: Edilio dal Farei-Campagna (mayor of Chironico)

Area
  - Total: 5.4 km^{2} (2.1 sq mi)
- Elevation: 1,300 m (4,300 ft)
- Time zone: UTC+01:00 (CET)
  - Summer (DST): UTC+02:00 (CEST)
- Postal code: 6760
- SFOS number: 5070
- ISO 3166 code: CH-TI
- Surrounded by: Acquarossa, Anzonico, Blenio, Calpiogna, Campello, Chironico, Dalpe, Mairengo, Seghin
- Website: www.gribbio.ch

Gribbio is an Italian-speaking village in Ticino, Switzerland, in the district of Chironico. It is situated in the Lepontine Alps, more specifically in Alta Leventina, between Chironico and Dalpe at an altitude of 1,300 metres.

== Demographics ==
The village consists of one church with an ambulatory priest, approximately 30 houses and a cafe/restaurant (Ul Ciurlin - The Little Coffee) with a small menu of typical dishes from the area. As the village is inaccessible in winter there are no permanent residents, but in summer there is a population of 80-100 people.

The local Italian is known as Leventinese, a subdivision of the Swiss Italian/Ticinese dialect and is particularly difficult for speakers of standard Italian to understand.

The local church is called L'Oratorio di San Rocco (Saint Roch).

== History ==
Originally farmers took their cows higher up into the mountains to graze over the summer, using Gribbio as a 'base camp' before returning down the valley for the winter. However, in recent years the village has become more popular as a summer holiday home.

Gribbio, unlike Osadigo, Cala, Doro or Olina Ces, has access to a passable road from Chironico, however the road is not cleared of snow and therefore is not accessible by car in winter except in unusually mild weather.

== Wildlife ==
The wildlife of the surrounding area includes chamois, red deer, alpine marmots and eagles. Hunting is forbidden in the area. One of the local features is Pizzo Forno, a mountain overlooking the village. The Gribbiasca River runs at the bottom of the village.
