= Pizzo Forno =

Mountain in Switzerland

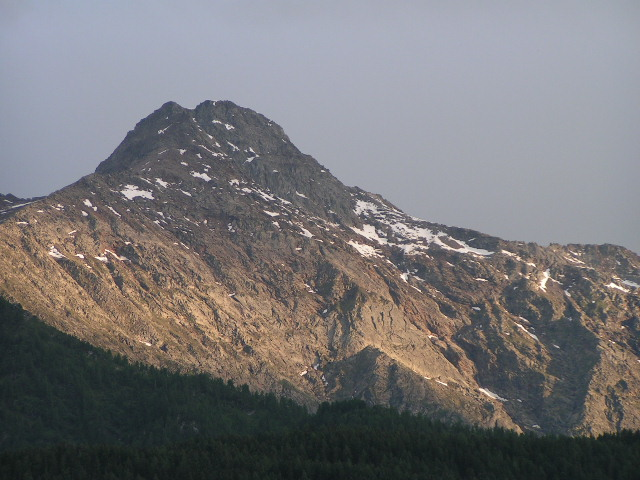
- Pizzo Forno, June 2005

Highest point
- Elevation: 2,907 m (9,537 ft)
- Prominence: 253 m (830 ft)
- Parent peak: Pizzo Campo Tencia
- Coordinates: 46°25′58.6″N 8°46′36.7″E

Geography
- Location within Switzerland
- Location: Ticino, Switzerland
- Parent range: Lepontine Alps

Pizzo Forno is a mountain of the Swiss Lepontine Alps, overlooking Chironico in the canton of Ticino. It is to be found between Piumogna Valley, Chironico Valley and Leventina Valley. It is in pyramid form and is separate from Pizzo Campo Tencia in the east. It is visible from the municipalities of Faido, Giornico and Chironico. The north-east face is particularly striking which rises nearly 1,500 metres from the Piumogna Valley - this face is best viewed from the village of Gribbio.

The rock is soft and is subject to frequent landslides. It is famous for its disten and staurolite crystals and for having given the surname Forni which is now common throughout the Leventina region.
