= Matteo Orelli =

13th-century Ghibelline nobleman

- Died: before 25 January 1282
- Occupations: Vogt and rector of Blenio, podestà of Leventina
- Known for: Control of Valle di Blenio, Leventina, and Riviera
- Relatives: Enrico Orelli (father), Simone Orelli (cousin), Guido Orelli (brother)

Matteo Orelli (first mentioned 1250 – before 25 January 1282) was a 13th-century Ghibelline nobleman who controlled Valle di Blenio, Leventina, and Riviera in what is now the Swiss canton of Ticino. He was the son of Enrico Orelli and cousin of Simone Orelli.

== Career ==
A representative of the Ghibelline party, Orelli became vogt and rector of Blenio around 1250. His father had lost the latter position to the rectors from Como approximately ten years earlier. Orelli held these functions until the late 1260s, when he was deprived of his fief. With the help of the valley's inhabitants, he recovered it in 1273 by expelling the representatives of the da Torre family from Como who had seized the Ambrosian valleys. On this occasion, the exiled Archbishop of Milan, Ottone Visconti, and probably the Ghibelline canons of Milan Cathedral, recognized him as podestà of Leventina (only for the 1270s).

Residing in Biasca, he controlled Valle di Blenio, Leventina, and Riviera, as well as their mountain passes, thereby considerably strengthening his power. His installation in the castle of Biasca had been desired by the canons in order to fill the position temporarily left vacant by Simone Orelli, who was imprisoned in Como, and of whom Matteo served as lieutenant.

== Military conflicts ==
With his cousin Simone and his brother Guido, Matteo participated in 1255 in the war declared by the Grisons nobles against the bishop of Chur, Heinrich von Montfort, who was allied with his brother Count Hugo and with the Abbot of Disentis. The nobles were defeated by the bishop's troops at Ems, and Orelli was taken prisoner on 26 August 1255. He probably regained his freedom fairly quickly by paying a ransom.

After years of conflicts and skirmishes between Valle di Blenio and Disentis, Orelli participated in 1261 in the signing of a peace and neutrality treaty between the Orelli family and Disentis (both the abbey and the community) at the Grisons locality (Saint Gall hospice).

== Bibliography ==
- Meyer, Karl. Die Capitanei von Locarno im Mittelalter. 1916, pp. 174–177, 186–187, 354.
- Schulthess, Hans. Die von Orelli von Locarno und Zürich. 1941, pp. 19–24.
- Meyer. Blenio. pp. 133–134, 211–218.
