= Reinher da Torre =

Bishop of Chur (d. 1209)

- Bishop of Chur
- Church: Roman Catholic Diocese of Chur

Personal details
- Died: 9 November 1209

Reinher da Torre (also known as Reinher della Torre; first mentioned 1194; died 9 November 1209) was Bishop of Chur from approximately 1194 until his death. He was the son of Alcherio da Torre and brother of Guido da Torre.

== Biography ==
Reinher da Torre served frequently as a pontifical arbiter. He consecrated altars at Marienberg Abbey (1201) and mediated in the dispute between the abbey and the parish of Burgusio (Val Venosta).

He expanded the episcopal lordship, notably by acquiring the castle of Steinsberg from Albert of Frickingen. In 1209, at Augsburg, he transferred the advocateship of the bishopric to Otto IV, who in return exempted him from imperial service and from the obligation to take part in his military campaigns. Chronicles mention Reinher's participation in the journey to Rome for the coronation of Otto IV in 1209, though this is not attested by any official document.

== Bibliography ==
- HS, I/1, 477
- Gatz, Bischöfe 1198, 137
