= Battle of Gorgonzola =

1245 battle between imperial and Milanese forces at Gorgonzola

- Part of the Guelph–Ghibelline conflict
Date	November 1245
Location	Gorgonzola, Kingdom of Italy
Result	Inconclusive: Milan halts the imperial offensive; Imperial tactical withdrawal

Belligerents
Holy Roman Empire; Ghibelline cities: Cremona; Parma; Bergamo	Milan: Rural militia; Genoese crossbowmen

Commanders and leaders
Enzo of Sardinia	Simone Orelli

Strength
5,000–8,000: 1,000 Cremonese, Parmese and Bergamasque cavalry; Cremonese infantry and carroccio	3,000–5,000: Militia from the Porta Orientale and Porta Comasina; Rural levies; 150 Genoese crossbowmen

Casualties and losses
Few hundred killed or wounded: Enzo of Sardinia briefly captured and released in exchange for an imperial withdrawal	500–900 killed, wounded or captured: Hundreds of infantry and about 40 cavalry captured

The Battle of Gorgonzola was fought in November 1245 between forces of the Holy Roman Empire under Enzo of Sardinia and troops of Milan commanded by Simone Orelli. It formed part of Emperor Frederick II's renewed attempt to overcome Milanese resistance following the breakdown of negotiations with Pope Innocent IV and the papal “deposition” of the emperor at the First Council of Lyon. The imperial forces broke through Milan's eastern defensive system, defeated the Milanese outside Gorgonzola and pursued them into the settlement, but Enzo was briefly captured during confused street fighting. His release was secured in return for the withdrawal of his troops, bringing the imperial offensive to an end.

== Background ==
During the autumn of 1245 Frederick prepared another offensive against Milan, whose continued resistance remained the principal obstacle to imperial predominance in Lombardy. The main imperial army advanced from Pavia toward Abbiategrasso, but Milanese troops blocked the line of the Ticinello, a broad canal strengthened by field fortifications. For more than a month the two armies faced one another across the water without either side obtaining a favourable opportunity for battle. Frederick therefore attempted a double movement, holding the Milanese in the west while ordering Enzo to attack from the east with cavalry from Cremona, Parma and Bergamo supported by Cremonese infantry. The intention was to envelop the Milanese and force them into open battle.

== Battle ==
Enzo initially encountered another Milanese defensive canal, the Adda nuovo, protected by troops under Simone Orelli. Rather than attack directly, he moved north on 4 November with his cavalry and crossed the Adda near Cassano d'Adda, overwhelming the comparatively small force guarding the passage. Turning south, Enzo struck the Milanese flank and seized control of the canal's water supply. Cremonese engineers drained the defensive waterway within four days, allowing the remainder of the imperial force to advance. Cassano and nearby settlements were taken and burned.

The Milanese regrouped at Gorgonzola, where their limited cavalry and inadequate fortifications left them vulnerable. Enzo attacked with superior forces and drove them back, capturing hundreds of infantrymen and approximately forty cavalry. Fighting then continued through the streets of the settlement. During the confused combat Enzo advanced too far ahead with only a small group of followers, was surrounded by Milanese troops and captured. He was confined in the village church and recognised by Orelli, who offered his release in exchange for an imperial withdrawal. Enzo accepted, ordered his troops to release their prisoners and retreat, and was then freed.

== Aftermath ==
The withdrawal transformed a battlefield advantage into an inconclusive overall result. Although Enzo's troops had broken the Milanese eastern defences and forced their opponents back at Gorgonzola, his capture prevented the imperial advance from continuing. On 12 November Enzo returned to Lodi, and two days later Frederick abandoned the camps along the Ticinello and withdrew the main army to Pavia before dispersing it for the winter. Stürner similarly places the operation within Frederick's attempt to combine his own army with Enzo's forces and compel Milan to battle, an objective that ultimately failed.

The episode nevertheless demonstrated the continued offensive capacity of the imperial-Ghibelline coalition even after Frederick's deposition at Lyon. Milan had prevented the intended encirclement and preserved its independence, but only after suffering substantial losses and the temporary collapse of its eastern defensive line. Thirty-eight Genoese crossbowmen captured during the operations were subsequently mutilated on Frederick's orders before being released, while Frederick withdrew to winter quarters in Tuscany and Enzo remained in northern Italy.

== Sources ==
- Grillo, Paolo (2023). Federico II: La guerra, le città e l'Impero. Milan: Mondadori. ISBN 978-88-04-76912-5.
- Stürner, Wolfgang (2000). Friedrich II. Teil 2: Der Kaiser 1220–1250. Darmstadt: Primus Verlag. ISBN 978-3-534-12229-5.
