= Guido da Torre =

Medieval lord in Blenio valley

- Died: after 1228
- Spouse: Bonavera
- Parent: Alcherio da Torre
- Relatives: Reinher da Torre (brother)

Guido da Torre (died after 1228) was a medieval lord active in the Val Blenio region of present-day Switzerland. He was the son of Alcherio da Torre and the brother of Reinher da Torre.

== Life ==
Guido da Torre was probably appointed avogadro of Blenio by Henry VI, likely in 1190 or 1191, but was subsequently defeated by his rival Vilfredo Orelli, who had been designated avogadro of the valley by the cathedral chapter of Milan. After reconciling with his enemies, Guido gave one of his daughters in marriage to Enrico Orelli, avogadro of Blenio.

In 1207, he sold the alpine pastures of Pradasca and Carassino to Olivone. In 1224, he was the principal witness for the barons of Sax-Misox during a lawsuit brought against the cathedral chapter of Milan concerning sovereignty over Val Blenio and the Leventina. In 1228, the seigneurial court of Sala, near Semione, stripped him of alpine pasture rights in favor of Olivone.

== Bibliography ==
=== Sources ===
- MDT, série 3

=== Secondary literature ===
- K. Meyer, Die Capitanei von Locarno im Mittelalter, 1916, pp. 156–158
