= Cavagnago =

- Former municipality
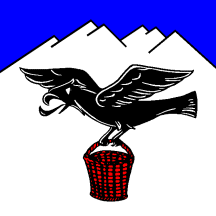
- Flag Coat of arms
- Location of Cavagnago
- Location within Switzerland Location within Canton of Ticino
- Coordinates: 46°25′N 8°53′E
- Country: Switzerland
- Canton: Ticino
- District: Leventina

Area
  - Total: 6.68 km^{2} (2.58 sq mi)
- Elevation: 1,020 m (3,350 ft)

Population (December 2004)
  - Total: 91
  - Density: 14/km^{2} (35/sq mi)
- Time zone: UTC+01:00 (CET)
  - Summer (DST): UTC+02:00 (CEST)
- Postal code: 6749
- SFOS number: 5068
- ISO 3166 code: CH-TI
- Surrounded by: Acquarossa, Anzonico, Giornico, Sobrio
- Website: cavagnago.ch

Cavagnago is a former municipality in the district of Leventina in the canton of Ticino in Switzerland. On 1 April 2012, it was incorporated into the municipality of Faido along with the former municipalities of Anzonico, Calpiogna, Campello, Chironico, Mairengo and Osco.

== History ==
Cavagnago is first mentioned in 1270 as Cavagnago. In the early 17th century, the hamlets of Segno, Mascengo and Codaghengo formed the village of Cavagnago which was a Degagna of the old Vicinanza of Giornico. In the Middle Ages, Cavagnago and Sobrio both worshiped at the 13th-century Chapel of St. Ambrose from Segno. The chapel had a massive romanesque clock tower and frescoes from the 15th-16th centuries. Cavagnago was part of the parish of Giornico, until it seceded in 1585, to form, with Sobrio, an independent parish. 1611 Sobrio parted from this parish. The Parish Church of St. Anna was first mentioned in 1567 and was renovated in 1934. It has a remarkable high altar in polychrome marble in the Milanese style and Roman style frontal crafted in the Scaglia style. Both pieces are from the 17th century.

In the 19th century Cavagnago was, despite high rate of emigration, still a thriving farming village. By the end of the 20th century there were still a few farms that had favorable terrain and were supported by numerous mountain pastures. The mountain pastures of Cavagnago also make a valued place for summer holidays.

== Geography ==
Aerial view (1954)

Cavagnago has an area, as of 1997, of 6.68 square kilometers (2.58 sq mi). Of this area, 0.47 km^{2} (0.18 sq mi) or 7.0% is used for agricultural purposes, while 4.97 km^{2} (1.92 sq mi) or 74.4% is forested. Of the rest of the land, 0.12 km^{2} (30 acres) or 1.8% is settled (buildings or roads) and 0.61 km^{2} (0.24 sq mi) or 9.1% is unproductive land. Of the built up area, housing and buildings made up 1.5% and transportation infrastructure made up 0.3%.

Out of the forested land, 67.7% of the total land area is heavily forested and 6.0% is covered with orchards or small clusters of trees. Of the agricultural land, 5.5% is used for growing crops and 1.5% is used for alpine pastures. Of the unproductive areas, 5.1% is unproductive vegetation and 4.0% is too rocky for vegetation.

The municipality is located in the Leventina district, at an elevation of 1,020 m (3,350 ft) on the left slope of the lower Leventina valley. It is on the Strada Alta in the middle of the so-called Traversa (Calonico, Anzonico, Cavagnago, Sobrio).

== Coat of arms ==
The blazon of the municipal coat of arms is Azure in base of the mountains Argent an eagle voland holding in its claws a basket Gules. The basket symbolizes the position of the village, located in a kind of hollow.

== Demographics ==
Cavagnago has a population (as of December 2020) of 81. As of 2008, 7.1% of the population are resident foreign nationals. Over the last 10 years (1997–2007) the population has changed at a rate of -7.4%.

Most of the population (as of 2000) speaks Italian(71.1%), with German being second most common (20.5%) and Portuguese being third ( 7.2%). Of the Swiss national languages (as of 2000), 17 speak German, 1 person speaks, French, 59 people speak Italian. The remainder (6 people) speak another language.

As of 2008, the gender distribution of the population was 49.4% male and 50.6% female. The population was made up of 38 Swiss men (44.7% of the population), and 4 (4.7%) non-Swiss men. There were 41 Swiss women (48.2%), and 2 (2.4%) non-Swiss women.

In 2008 there were 0 live births and there were 2 deaths of Swiss citizens. Ignoring immigration and emigration, the population of Swiss citizens decreased by 2 while the foreign population remained the same. There was 1 Swiss woman who immigrated back to Switzerland. The total Swiss population change in 2008 (from all sources) was a decrease of 3 and the non-Swiss population remained steady. This represents a population growth rate of -3.4%.

The age distribution, as of 2009, in Cavagnago is; children or 0.0% of the population are between 0 and 9 years old and 5 teenagers or 5.9% are between 10 and 19. Of the adult population, 6 people or 7.1% of the population are between 20 and 29 years old. 8 people or 9.4% are between 30 and 39, 9 people or 10.6% are between 40 and 49, and 14 people or 16.5% are between 50 and 59. The senior population distribution is 15 people or 17.6% of the population are between 60 and 69 years old, 15 people or 17.6% are between 70 and 79, and there are 13 people or 15.3% who are over 80.

As of 2000 the average number of residents per living room was 0.44 which is fewer people per room than the cantonal average of 0.6 per room. In this case, a room is defined as space of a housing unit of at least 4 m^{2} (43 sq ft) as normal bedrooms, dining rooms, living rooms, kitchens and habitable cellars and attics. About 68.2% of the total households were owner occupied, or in other words did not pay rent (though they may have a mortgage or a rent-to-own agreement).

As of 2000, there were 44 private households in the municipality, and an average of 1.8 persons per household. In 2000 there were 146 single family homes (or 93.0% of the total) out of a total of 157 inhabited buildings. There were 8 two family buildings (5.1%) and 2 multi-family buildings (1.3%). There were also 1 buildings in the municipality that were multipurpose buildings (used for both housing and commercial or another purpose).

The vacancy rate for the municipality, in 2008, was 0%. In 2000 there were 174 apartments in the municipality. The most common apartment size was the 4 room apartment of which there were 55. There were 5 single room apartments and 35 apartments with five or more rooms. Of these apartments, a total of 44 apartments (25.3% of the total) were permanently occupied, while 128 apartments (73.6%) were seasonally occupied and 2 apartments (1.1%) were empty. As of 2007, the construction rate of new housing units was 0 new units per 1000 residents.

The historical population is given in the following table:

year	population
1574	305
1602	191
1745	215
1850	342
1900	175
1950	134
2000	83

== Politics ==
In the 2007 federal election the most popular party was the CVP which received 32.3% of the vote. The next three most popular parties were the SP (25.58%), the FDP (25.32%) and the Ticino League (11.11%). In the federal election, a total of 50 votes were cast, and the voter turnout was 59.5%.

In the 2007 Gran Consiglio election, there were a total of 87 registered voters in Cavagnago, of which 57 or 65.5% voted. The most popular party was the PPD+GenGiova which received 17 or 29.8% of the vote. The next three most popular parties were; the PLRT (with 14 or 24.6%), the PLRT (with 14 or 24.6%) and the SSI (with 9 or 15.8%).

In the 2007 Consiglio di Stato election, The most popular party was the PPD which received 16 or 28.1% of the vote. The next three most popular parties were; the PS (with 15 or 26.3%), the PLRT (with 13 or 22.8%) and the SSI (with 10 or 17.5%).

== Economy ==
As of 2007, Cavagnago had an unemployment rate of 3.43%. As of 2005, there were 17 people employed in the primary economic sector and about 7 businesses involved in this sector. 1 person was employed in the secondary sector and there was 1 business in this sector. 8 people were employed in the tertiary sector, with 2 businesses in this sector. There were 34 residents of the municipality who were employed in some capacity, of which females made up 35.3% of the workforce.

In 2000, there were 7 workers who commuted into the municipality and 13 workers who commuted away. The municipality is a net exporter of workers, with about 1.9 workers leaving the municipality for every one entering. Of the working population, 5.9% used public transportation to get to work, and 50% used a private car.

== Religion ==
From the 2000 census, 65 or 78.3% were Roman Catholic, while 4 or 4.8% belonged to the Swiss Reformed Church. There are 13 individuals (or about 15.66% of the population) who belong to another church (not listed on the census), and 1 individuals (or about 1.20% of the population) did not answer the question.

== Education ==
In Cavagnago about 48.8% of the population (between age 25–64) have completed either non-mandatory upper secondary education or additional higher education (either University or a Fachhochschule).

In Cavagnago there were a total of 8 students (as of 2009). The Ticino education system provides up to three years of non-mandatory kindergarten and in Cavagnago there were children in kindergarten. The primary school program lasts for five years and includes both a standard school and a special school. In the municipality, 1 student attended the standard primary school. In the lower secondary school system, students either attend a two-year middle school followed by a two-year pre-apprenticeship or they attend a four-year program to prepare for higher education. There were 3 students in the two-year middle school and 2 in their pre-apprenticeship, while 0 students were in the four-year advanced program.

The upper secondary school includes several options, but at the end of the upper secondary program, a student will be prepared to enter a trade or to continue on to a university or college. In Ticino, vocational students may either attend school while working on their internship or apprenticeship (which takes three or four years) or may attend school followed by an internship or apprenticeship (which takes one year as a full-time student or one and a half to two years as a part-time student). There were 2 vocational students who were attending school full-time and 0 who attend part-time.

As of 2000, there were 5 students from Cavagnago who attended schools outside the municipality.
