= Mairengo =

- Former municipality
- Flag Coat of arms
- Location of Mairengo
- Location within Switzerland Location within Canton of Ticino
- Coordinates: 46°29′N 8°47′E
- Country: Switzerland
- Canton: Ticino
- District: Leventina

Area
  - Total: 6.65 km^{2} (2.57 sq mi)
- Elevation: 920 m (3,020 ft)

Population (December 2004)
  - Total: 413
  - Density: 62.1/km^{2} (161/sq mi)
- Time zone: UTC+01:00 (CET)
  - Summer (DST): UTC+02:00 (CEST)
- Postal code: 6763
- SFOS number: 5074
- ISO 3166 code: CH-TI
- Surrounded by: Blenio, Calpiogna, Dalpe, Faido, Osco
- Website: SFSO statistics

Mairengo is a former municipality in the district of Leventina in the canton of Ticino in Switzerland. On 1 April 2012, it was incorporated into the municipality of Faido along with the former municipalities of Anzonico, Calpiogna, Campello, Cavagnago, Chironico and Osco.

== History ==
Mairengo is first mentioned in 1201 as Mairencho. During the Middle Ages the village belonged to the Degagna of Tarnolgio, which was part of the Vicinanza of Faido. Their annual meetings took place alternately, twice in Mairengo and once in Faido.

The parish of Mairengo also included Faido, Osco, Calpiogna and Campello. The church of San Siro was first mentioned in 1171 and in the 16th century it was expanded and renovated. It was the most important church in the central Levantine. The current building was restored in 2001, but still bears traces of the old romanesque church facade.

The local economy was based on livestock, which had virtually disappeared at the end of the 20th century, although the alpine pasture of Alp Formazzora in the Bedretto valley was still cultivated. The village section of Polmengo is home to a large construction site for the new Gotthard Base Tunnel.

== Geography ==
Aerial view (1954)

Mairengo has an area, as of 1997, of 6.65 square kilometers (2.57 sq mi). Of this area, 0.3 km^{2} (0.12 sq mi) or 4.5% is used for agricultural purposes, while 2.65 km^{2} (1.02 sq mi) or 39.8% is forested. Of the rest of the land, 0.26 km^{2} (0.10 sq mi) or 3.9% is settled (buildings or roads), 0.07 km^{2} (17 acres) or 1.1% is either rivers or lakes and 2.52 km^{2} (0.97 sq mi) or 37.9% is unproductive land.

Of the built up area, housing and buildings made up 1.7% and transportation infrastructure made up 1.2%. Power and water infrastructure as well as other special developed areas made up 1.1% of the area Out of the forested land, 36.2% of the total land area is heavily forested and 3.6% is covered with orchards or small clusters of trees. Of the agricultural land, 2.9% is used for growing crops and 1.7% is used for alpine pastures. All the water in the municipality is flowing water. Of the unproductive areas, 25.7% is unproductive vegetation and 12.2% is too rocky for vegetation.

The municipality is located in the Leventina district, on a terrace on the left side of the mid-Leventina valley. It consists of the village of Mairengo and the hamlets of Tortengo, Raslina and Polmengo.

== Coat of arms ==
The blazon of the municipal coat of arms is Chequy Argent and Gules overall a bull's head caboshed Sable.

== Demographics ==
Mairengo has a population (as of December 2020) of 562. As of 2008, 61.6% of the population are resident foreign nationals. Over the last 10 years (1997–2007) the population has changed at a rate of 76.3%.

Most of the population (as of 2000) speaks Italian(78.7%), with German being second most common ( 8.1%) and Serbo-Croatian being third ( 6.6%). Of the Swiss national languages (as of 2000), 22 speak German, 1 person speaks French and 214 people speak Italian. The remainder (35 people) speak another language.

As of 2008, the gender distribution of the population was 78.9% male and 21.1% female. The population was made up of 101 Swiss men (17.7% of the population), and 349 (61.2%) non-Swiss men. There were 98 Swiss women (17.2%), and 22 (3.9%) non-Swiss women.

In 2008 there was 1 birth to non-Swiss citizens, and 1 death of a Swiss citizen. Ignoring immigration and emigration, the population of Swiss citizens decreased by 1 while the foreign population increased by 1. There was 1 Swiss man who emigrated from Switzerland. At the same time, there were 2 non-Swiss men who emigrated from Switzerland to another country and 2 non-Swiss women who immigrated from another country to Switzerland. The total Swiss population change in 2008 (from all sources) was a decrease of 4 and the non-Swiss population change was an increase of 4 people. This represents a population growth rate of 0.0%.

The age distribution, as of 2009, in Mairengo is; 17 children or 3.0% of the population are between 0 and 9 years old and 31 teenagers or 5.4% are between 10 and 19. Of the adult population, 62 people or 10.9% of the population are between 20 and 29 years old. 109 people or 19.1% are between 30 and 39, 171 people or 30.0% are between 40 and 49, and 102 people or 17.9% are between 50 and 59. The senior population distribution is 48 people or 8.4% of the population are between 60 and 69 years old, 17 people or 3.0% are between 70 and 79, there are 13 people or 2.3% who are over 80.

As of 2000 the average number of residents per living room was 0.67 which is more people per room than the cantonal average of 0.6 per room. In this case, a room is defined as space of a housing unit of at least 4 m^{2} (43 sq ft) as normal bedrooms, dining rooms, living rooms, kitchens and habitable cellars and attics. About 57.4% of the total households were owner occupied, or in other words did not pay rent (though they may have a mortgage or a rent-to-own agreement).

As of 2000, there were 94 private households in the municipality, and an average of 2.8 persons per household. In 2000 there were 133 single family homes (or 83.1% of the total) out of a total of 160 inhabited buildings. There were 19 two family buildings (11.9%) and 5 multi-family buildings (3.1%). There were also 3 buildings in the municipality that were multipurpose buildings (used for both housing and commercial or another purpose).

The vacancy rate for the municipality, in 2008, was 0%. In 2000 there were 200 apartments in the municipality. The most common apartment size was the 5 room apartment of which there were 60. There were 10 single room apartments and 60 apartments with five or more rooms. Of these apartments, a total of 94 apartments (47.0% of the total) were permanently occupied, while 104 apartments (52.0%) were seasonally occupied and 2 apartments (1.0%) were empty. As of 2007, the construction rate of new housing units was 1.9 new units per 1000 residents.

The historical population is given in the following table:

| year | population |
|---|---|
| 1567 | 34 Households |
| 1745 | 163 |
| 1850 | 170 |
| 1900 | 198 |
| 1950 | 189 |
| 1980 | 375 |
| 2000 | 272 |

== Heritage sites of national significance ==
The parish church of S. Siro is listed as a Swiss heritage site of national significance.

The church is first mentioned in 1170, but probably dates back to the 11th century. It is one of the oldest churches in the Levantina valley. It was renovated in the 16th century and, later, the church tower was rebuilt in 1574–75. The new church had two naves and a rectangular choir. The facade retains some of the elements of the earlier church. Inside, there is a side altar from a German workshop that was built between 1510 and 1520. The walls also feature a mural from 1558 by Gerolamo Gorla da Milano and paintings from the 17th century.

== Politics ==
In the 2007 federal election the most popular party was the FDP which received 34.41% of the vote. The next three most popular parties were the Ticino League (20.17%), the CVP (15.23%) and the SP (14.81%). In the federal election, a total of 92 votes were cast, and the voter turnout was 56.1%.

In the 2007 Gran Consiglio election, there were a total of 170 registered voters in Mairengo, of which 117 or 68.8% voted. 2 blank ballots were cast, leaving 115 valid ballots in the election. The most popular party was the PLRT which received 42 or 36.5% of the vote. The next three most popular parties were; the SSI (with 28 or 24.3%), the PPD+GenGiova (with 14 or 12.2%) and the LEGA (with 13 or 11.3%).

In the 2007 Consiglio di Stato election, 2 null ballots were cast, leaving 115 valid ballots in the election. The most popular party was the PLRT which received 44 or 38.3% of the vote. The next three most popular parties were; the LEGA (with 18 or 15.7%), the SSI (with 17 or 14.8%) and the PS (with 16 or 13.9%).

== Economy ==
As of 2007, Mairengo had an unemployment rate of 2.37%. As of 2005, there were 7 people employed in the primary economic sector and about 2 businesses involved in this sector. 2 people were employed in the secondary sector and there was 1 business in this sector. 8 people were employed in the tertiary sector, with 5 businesses in this sector. There were 115 residents of the municipality who were employed in some capacity, of which females made up 33.0% of the workforce.

In 2000, there were 99 workers who commuted away from the municipality. Of the working population, 8.7% used public transportation to get to work, and 57.4% used a private car.

== Religion ==
From the 2000 census, 200 or 73.5% were Roman Catholic, while 13 or 4.8% belonged to the Swiss Reformed Church. There are 56 individuals (or about 20.59% of the population) who belong to another church (not listed on the census), and 3 individuals (or about 1.10% of the population) did not answer the question.

== Education ==
The entire Swiss population is generally well educated. In Mairengo about 61.3% of the population (between age 25 and 64) have completed either non-mandatory upper secondary education or additional higher education (either university or a Fachhochschule).

In Mairengo there were a total of 31 students (as of 2009). The Ticino education system provides up to three years of non-mandatory kindergarten and in Mairengo there were 4 children in kindergarten. The primary school program lasts for five years and includes both a standard school and a special school. In the municipality, 9 students attended the standard primary schools and 0 students attended the special school. In the lower secondary school system, students either attend a two-year middle school followed by a two-year pre-apprenticeship or they attend a four-year program to prepare for higher education. There were 7 students in the two-year middle school and 0 in their pre-apprenticeship, while 6 students were in the four-year advanced program.

The upper secondary school includes several options, but at the end of the upper secondary program, a student will be prepared to enter a trade or to continue on to a university or college. In Ticino, vocational students may either attend school while working on their internship or apprenticeship (which takes three or four years) or may attend school followed by an internship or apprenticeship (which takes one year as a full-time student or one and a half to two years as a part-time student). There were 0 vocational students who were attending school full-time and 4 who attend part-time.

The professional program lasts three years and prepares a student for a job in engineering, nursing, computer science, business, tourism and similar fields. There was 1 student in the professional program.

As of 2000, there were 28 students from Mairengo who attended schools outside the municipality.
