= Calpiogna =

- Former municipality
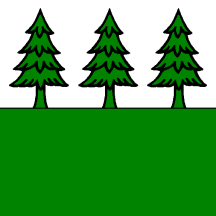
- Flag Coat of arms
- Location of Calpiogna
- Location within Switzerland Location within Canton of Ticino
- Coordinates: 46°29′N 8°48′E
- Country: Switzerland
- Canton: Ticino
- District: Leventina

Area
  - Total: 3.3 km^{2} (1.3 sq mi)
- Elevation: 1,149 m (3,770 ft)

Population (December 2004)
  - Total: 39
  - Density: 12/km^{2} (31/sq mi)
- Time zone: UTC+01:00 (CET)
  - Summer (DST): UTC+02:00 (CEST)
- Postal code: 6760
- SFOS number: 5066
- ISO 3166 code: CH-TI
- Surrounded by: Blenio, Campello, Faido, Mairengo
- Website: SFSO statistics

Calpiogna is a former municipality in the district of Leventina in the canton of Ticino in Switzerland. On 1 April 2012, it was incorporated into the municipality of Faido along with the former municipalities of Osco, Mairengo, Campello, Chironico, Anzonico and Cavagnago.

== History ==
Calpiogna is first mentioned in 1246 as Calpiognia. The village was the seat of the still existing Degagna of Fichengo, one of three Degagne that makes up the Vicinanza (cooperative village) of Faido including Primadengo, Calpiogna, Campello, Fontanedo (abandoned in the 18th century), Chinchengo and a part of the village of Faido as well as several alpine pastures in Graubünden. In the Middle Ages the village belonged to the parish of Mairengo. However, since 1670 it has formed a separate parish, which until 1837 included Campello. The Chapel of S. Eutichio was first mentioned in 1577. It was rebuilt in 1665 and consecrated to St. Athanasius. The chapel of St. Anthony of Padua in Primadengo dates back to 1651. The village lived on farming and grazing, while periodic and seasonal emigration secured additional income. In the 19th century many residents of the village began to emigrate to France, England and the United States. Emigration increased in the 20th century. Since the 1950s the former mountain pastures of Prodör draw numerous winter and summer visitors (with Carì).

== Geography ==
Aerial view (1967) of the upper part of the municipality with the village of Prodör in the foreground

Calpiogna has an area, as of 1997, of 3.3 square kilometers (1.3 sq mi). Of this area, 0.22 km^{2} (0.085 sq mi) or 6.7% is used for agricultural purposes, while 1.7 km^{2} (0.66 sq mi) or 51.5% is forested. Of the rest of the land, 0.16 km^{2} (0.062 sq mi) or 4.8% is settled (buildings or roads), 0.04 km^{2} (9.9 acres) or 1.2% is either rivers or lakes and 0.73 km^{2} (0.28 sq mi) or 22.1% is unproductive land.

Of the built up area, housing and buildings made up 2.7% and transportation infrastructure made up 1.8%. Out of the forested land, 48.2% of the total land area is heavily forested and 1.8% is covered with orchards or small clusters of trees. Of the agricultural land, 3.9% is used for growing crops and 2.7% is used for alpine pastures. Of the water in the municipality, 0.6% is in lakes and 0.6% is in rivers and streams. Of the unproductive areas, 15.8% is unproductive vegetation and 6.4% is too rocky for vegetation.

The municipality is located in the Leventina district, on a terrace at an elevation of 1,149 m (3,770 ft) on the left side of the mid-Leventina valley. It consists of the village of Calpiogna, the hamlet of Primadengo, which is at an elevation of 975 m (3,199 ft), and the former mayen of Prodör at an elevation of 1,647 m (5,404 ft). The municipality of Campello was part of Calpiogna until 1853.

== Coat of arms ==
The blazon of the municipal coat of arms is Per fess Argent and Vert in the first three fir trees issuant of the second.

== Demographics ==
Calpiogna has a population (as of December 2020) of 41. As of 2008, 9.3% of the population are resident foreign nationals. Over the last 10 years (1997–2007) the population has changed at a rate of -24.5%.

Most of the population (as of 2000) speaks Italian (85.0%), with German being second most common (15.0%). Of the Swiss national languages (as of 2000), 6 speak German, 34 people speak Italian.

As of 2008, the gender distribution of the population was 46.8% male and 53.2% female. The population was made up of 19 Swiss men (40.4% of the population), and 3 (6.4%) non-Swiss men. There were 22 Swiss women (46.8%), and 3 (6.4%) non-Swiss women.

In 2008 there was 1 live birth to Swiss citizens and 1 death of a Swiss citizen. Ignoring immigration and emigration, the population of Swiss citizens and the foreign population remained the same. There was 1 non-Swiss woman who immigrated from another country to Switzerland. The total Swiss population change in 2008 (from all sources) was an increase of 5 and the non-Swiss population change was an increase of 1 people. This represents a population growth rate of 16.2%.

The age distribution, as of 2009, in Calpiogna is; 3 children or 6.4% of the population are between 0 and 9 years old and 3 teenagers or 6.4% are between 10 and 19. Of the adult population, 7 people or 14.9% of the population are between 20 and 29 years old. 5 people or 10.6% are between 30 and 39, 6 people or 12.8% are between 40 and 49, and 11 people or 23.4% are between 50 and 59. The senior population distribution is 5 people or 10.6% of the population are between 60 and 69 years old, 3 people or 6.4% are between 70 and 79, there are 4 people or 8.5% who are over 80.

As of 2000 the average number of residents per living room was 0.41 which is fewer people per room than the cantonal average of 0.6 per room. In this case, a room is defined as space of a housing unit of at least 4 m^{2} (43 sq ft) as normal bedrooms, dining rooms, living rooms, kitchens and habitable cellars and attics. About 77.8% of the total households were owner occupied, or in other words did not pay rent (though they may have a mortgage or a rent-to-own agreement).

As of 2000, there were 18 private households in the municipality, and an average of 1.9 persons per household. In 2000 there were 103 single family homes (or 87.3% of the total) out of a total of 118 inhabited buildings. There were 10 two family buildings (8.5%) and 1 multi-family buildings (0.8%). There were also 4 buildings in the municipality that were multipurpose buildings (used for both housing and commercial or another purpose).

The vacancy rate for the municipality, in 2008, was 0%. In 2000 there were 130 apartments in the municipality. The most common apartment size was the 5 room apartment of which there were 46. There were 5 single room apartments and 46 apartments with five or more rooms. Of these apartments, a total of 18 apartments (13.8% of the total) were permanently occupied, while 112 apartments (86.2%) were seasonally occupied and 0 apartments were empty. As of 2007, the construction rate of new housing units was 0 new units per 1000 residents.

The historical population is given in the following table:

year	population
1567	37 Hearths
1639	93
1745	211
1850	354
1860	181
1900	147
1950	99
1980	86
1990	73
2000	40

== Sights ==
The entire villages of Calpiogna and Primadengo were designated as part of the Inventory of Swiss Heritage Sites

== Politics ==
In the 2007 federal election the most popular party was the CVP which received 42.5% of the vote. The next three most popular parties were the SVP (20.63%), the FDP (16.25%) and the Ticino League (14.38%). In the federal election, a total of 22 votes were cast, and the voter turnout was 48.9%.

In the 2007 Gran Consiglio election, there were a total of 125 registered voters in Calpiogna, of which 25 or 20.0% voted. The most popular party was the PPD+GenGiova which received 15 or 60.0% of the vote. The next three most popular parties were; the SSI (with 6 or 24.0%), the PLRT (with 2 or 8.0%) and the PS (with 1 or 4.0%).

In the 2007 Consiglio di Stato election, 1 null ballot was cast, leaving 24 valid ballots in the election. The most popular party was the PPD which received 15 or 62.5% of the vote. The next three most popular parties were; the SSI (with 5 or 20.8%), the PLRT (with 2 or 8.3%) and the LEGA (with 1 or 4.2%).

== Economy ==
As of 2007, Calpiogna had an unemployment rate of 0.42%. As of 2005, there were 6 people employed in the primary economic sector and about 3 businesses involved in this sector. people were employed in the secondary sector and there were businesses in this sector. 2 people were employed in the tertiary sector, with 1 business in this sector. There were 20 residents of the municipality who were employed in some capacity, of which females made up 20.0% of the workforce.

In 2000, there were no workers who commuted into the municipality and 12 workers who commuted away. The municipality is an exporter of workers. Of the working population, 15% used public transportation to get to work, and 50% used a private car.

== Religion ==
From the 2000 census, 34 or 85.0% were Roman Catholic, while 5 or 12.5% belonged to the Swiss Reformed Church. There are 1 individuals (or about 2.50% of the population) who belong to another church (not listed on the census), and

== Education ==
The entire Swiss population is generally well educated. In Calpiogna about 63.7% of the population (between age 25 and 64) have completed either non-mandatory upper secondary education or additional higher education (either University or a Fachhochschule).

In Calpiogna there were a total of four students (as of 2009). The Ticino education system provides up to three years of non-mandatory kindergarten and in Calpiogna there were children in kindergarten. The primary school program lasts for five years and includes both a standard school and a special school. In the municipality, three students attended the standard primary schools. In the lower secondary school system, students either attend a two-year middle school followed by a two-year pre-apprenticeship or they attend a four-year program to prepare for higher education. There was one student in the two-year middle school.

The upper secondary school includes several options, but at the end of the upper secondary program, a student will be prepared to enter a trade or to continue on to a university or college. In Ticino, vocational students may either attend school while working on their internship or apprenticeship (which takes three or four years) or may attend school followed by an internship or apprenticeship (which takes one year as a full-time student or one and a half to two years as a part-time student).

As of 2000, there were 5 students who lived in Calpiogna who attended schools outside the municipality.
