= Faido =

- Municipality
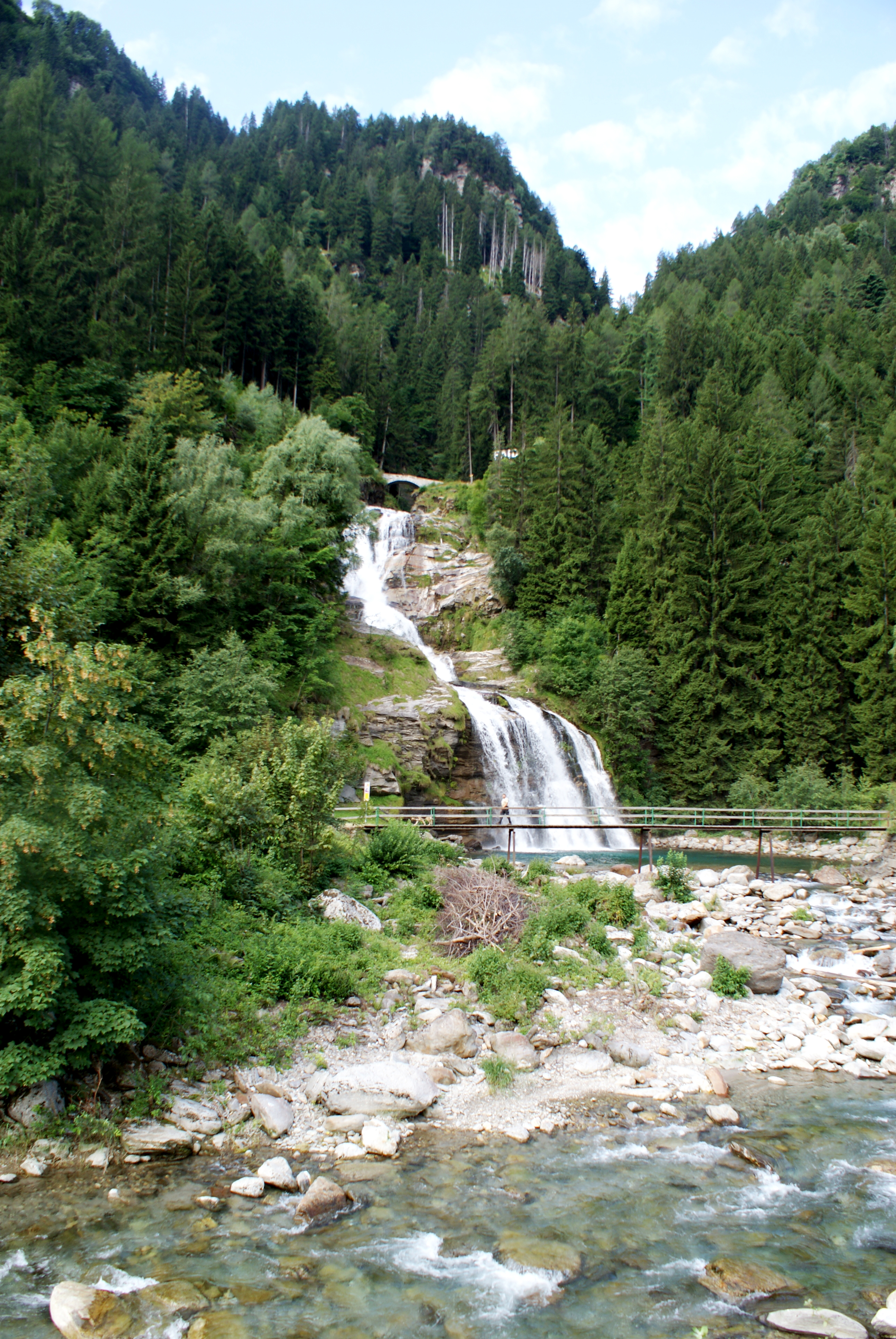
- Waterfall near Faido village

- Flag Coat of arms
- Location of Faido
- Location within Switzerland Location within Canton of Ticino
- Coordinates: 46°29′N 8°48′E
- Country: Switzerland
- Canton: Ticino
- District: Leventina

Government
  - Mayor: Sindaco; Corrado Nastasi

Area
  - Total: 25.4 km^{2} (9.8 sq mi)
- Elevation: 711 m (2,333 ft)

Population (December 2002)
  - Total: 1,522
  - Density: 59.9/km^{2} (155/sq mi)
- Time zone: UTC+01:00 (CET)
  - Summer (DST): UTC+02:00 (CEST)
- Postal code: 6760
- SFOS number: 5072
- ISO 3166 code: CH-TI
- Localities: Chiggiogna, Rossura, Calonico
- Surrounded by: Acquarossa, Anzonico, Blenio, Calpiogna, Campello, Chironico, Dalpe, Mairengo
- Website: www.faido.ch

Faido (Italian: [faˈiːdo]; Ticinese: Faid) is the capital of the district of Leventina in the Italian-speaking canton of Ticino in southern Switzerland.

On 29 January 2006, Faido grew by incorporating the villages of Chiggiogna, Rossura, and Calonico.

On 1 April 2012, Faido grew again when it incorporated the former municipalities of Anzonico, Calpiogna, Campello, Cavagnago, Chironico, Mairengo and Osco.

It grew again on 10 April 2016 when Sobrio was absorbed into the municipality.

== History ==
The municipality is first documented in 1171 as Faedo. In German it was previously known as Feit or Pfaid. Crucial for the development of the municipality into a regional center was the location in the middle of the valley and at the foot of the gorge of Mount Piottino. The mountain was a barrier to passenger and goods transport, which required a stop and facilities for travelers. Additionally, under Uri's rule (15th–18th century), it was the capital of the Levantina and a key to Uri's control of the Ticino. The meetings of the local head of the Levantine (parlamento generale) and the Council of the valley community were held in Faido.

The former Vicinanza of Faido (based in Mairengo) consisted of three Degagna.

During the Middle Ages the church of San Siro in Mairengo (first mentioned in 1171) was the baptistery of the Vicinanza. The village church of S. Andrea in Faido was first mentioned in the 13th century. Following the fire of 1331, it was rebuilt and in 1579 was elevated to a parish church. It was expanded in 1830. The Chapel of St. Bernardino of Siena from 1459 was under the patronage of the Varesi family, which also owned a six-story tower house. In 1607, a Capuchin monastery was founded, which was for a long time the seat of the Seminary of the Capuchins and cultural center. The monastery school was open to boys from the valley. The monastery complex includes the Church of San Francesco, built in 1608, and rebuilt in 1785/86.

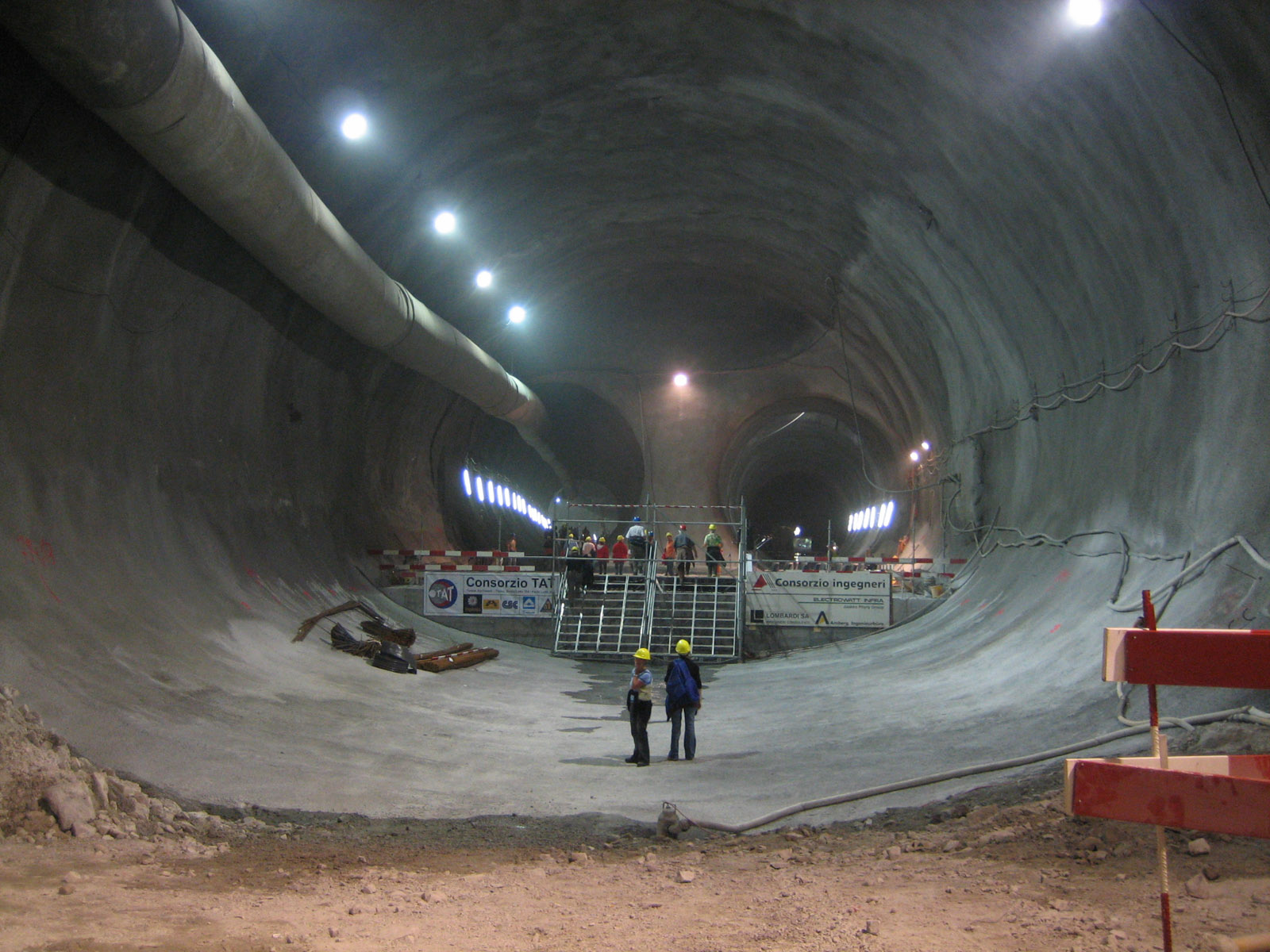
Construction of the Gotthard Base Tunnel near Faido

The history of the 19th century in the valley, revolved about the Gotthard road (built 1820–30) and the Gotthard Rail Tunnel (1871–1881). The railway encouraged the founding various hotels (including the Hôtel Suisse in 1905) and the spread of crafts and small industries. In 1889, Faido was the first town in Ticino with electric lighting. Like most of the Leventina, many inhabitants emigrated to France, England, Australia and America. However, Faido also experienced an immigration of artisans and the establishment of small industrial enterprises, some of them as branches of government-operated enterprises. Most of these small businesses have since disappeared or moved. Before World War I, the village was, especially with Milanese families, a popular and bustling holiday resort. The Leventiner Hospital S. Croce was built in 1917 on the initiative of the clergy. It is a retirement home since 1992. The current District Hospital was built in 1923 at the request of residents and civic communities of the Levantine. In 1976 Faido fought successfully against the fragmentation of the municipal area by the highway and got a bypass tunnel.

In the spring of 2004, the residents voted for incorporating the surrounding municipalities of Chiggiogna, Osco, Mairengo, Calpiogna, Campello, Rossura, Calonico, Anzonico, Cavagnago, and Sobrio. Most of the municipalities rejected the proposition, and the new municipality consists of Faido, Chiggiogna, Rossura, and Calonico.

== Geography ==
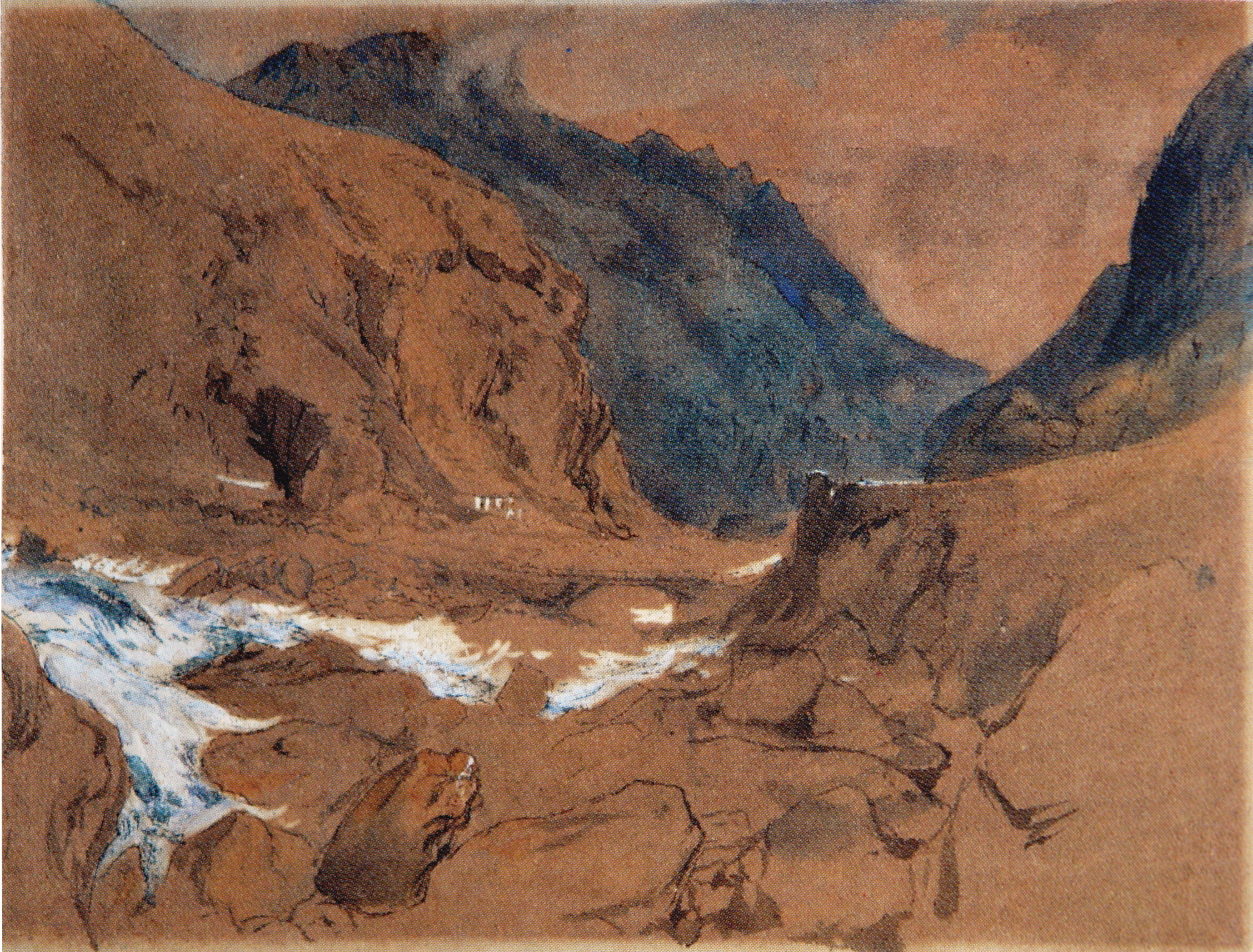
Faido pass up to the Gotthard pass, from 1845

Aerial view by Walter Mittelholzer (1931)

Faido has an area, as of 1997, of 25.4 square kilometers (9.8 sq mi). Of this area, 0.87 km^{2} (0.34 sq mi) or 3.4% is used for agricultural purposes, while 2.36 km^{2} (0.91 sq mi) or 9.3% is forested. Of the rest of the land, 0.79 km^{2} (0.31 sq mi) or 3.1% is settled (buildings or roads), 0.07 km^{2} (17 acres) or 0.3% is either rivers or lakes and 0.06 km^{2} (15 acres) or 0.2% is unproductive land.

Of the built up area, housing and buildings made up 1.5% and transportation infrastructure made up 1.1%. Out of the forested land, all of the forested land area is covered with heavy forests. Of the agricultural land, 1.9% is used for growing crops and 1.5% is used for alpine pastures. All the water in the municipality is flowing water.

The municipality is the district capital and home of the district court of the Leventina. In 2006 Faido merged with Fuso, Chiggiogna, Faido and Rossura. It grew again following the 2012 merger with Anzonico, Calpiogna, Campello, Cavagnago, Chironico, Mairengo and Osco.

== Coat of arms ==
The blazon of the municipal coat of arms is Gules a Latin cross couped indented Argent and issuant from it a hand in blessing of the same clead Purpure.

== Demographics ==
Faido has a population (as of December 2020) of 2,823. As of 2008, 29.6% of the population are resident foreign nationals. Over the last 10 years (1997–2007) the population has changed at a rate of -8.2%.

Most of the population (as of 2000) speaks Italian (84.2%), with Serbo-Croatian being second most common ( 7.7%) and German being third ( 3.5%). Of the Swiss national languages (as of 2000), 44 speak German, 18 people speak French, 1,288 people speak Italian. The remainder (198 people) speak another language.

As of 2008, the gender distribution of the population was 48.8% male and 51.2% female. The population was made up of 661 Swiss men (33.0% of the population), and 318 (15.9%) non-Swiss men. There were 737 Swiss women (36.7%), and 290 (14.5%) non-Swiss women.

In 2008 there were 10 live births to Swiss citizens and 5 births to non-Swiss citizens, and in same time span there were 16 deaths of Swiss citizens and 2 non-Swiss citizen deaths. Ignoring immigration and emigration, the population of Swiss citizens decreased by 6 while the foreign population increased by 3. There were 2 Swiss men who emigrated from Switzerland. At the same time, there were 15 non-Swiss men and 8 non-Swiss women who immigrated from another country to Switzerland. The total Swiss population change in 2008 (from all sources) was an increase of 4 and the non-Swiss population change was an increase of 3 people. This represents a population growth rate of 0.4%.

The age distribution, as of 2009, in Faido is; 142 children or 7.1% of the population are between 0 and 9 years old and 205 teenagers or 10.2% are between 10 and 19. Of the adult population, 245 people or 12.2% of the population are between 20 and 29 years old. 231 people or 11.5% are between 30 and 39, 331 people or 16.5% are between 40 and 49, and 313 people or 15.6% are between 50 and 59. The senior population distribution is 210 people or 10.5% of the population are between 60 and 69 years old, 173 people or 8.6% are between 70 and 79, there are 156 people or 7.8% who are over 80.

The vacancy rate for the municipality, in 2008, was 2.66%. In 2000 there were 737 apartments in the municipality. The most common apartment size was the 4 room apartment of which there were 246. There were 47 single room apartments and 128 apartments with five or more rooms. Of these apartments, a total of 613 apartments (83.2% of the total) were permanently occupied, while 95 apartments (12.9%) were seasonally occupied and 29 apartments (3.9%) were empty. As of 2007, the construction rate of new housing units was 2 new units per 1000 residents.

== Historic Population ==
The historical population is given in the following chart:

== Heritage sites of national significance ==
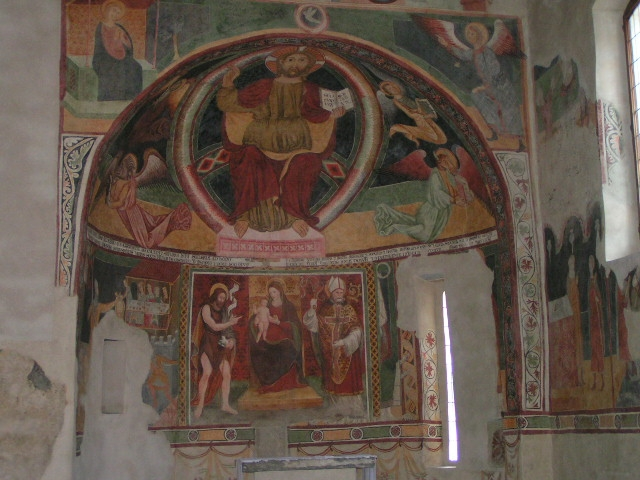
Church of S. Ambrogio

The Church of S. Ambrogio, the Torre Pedrini, the parish church of S. Siro, the Selvini House, the Church of S. Maria Assunta and the parish church of SS. Lorenzo e Agata are listed as Swiss heritage site of national significance. The villages of Anzonico, Calpiogna, Primadengo, Chironico, Brusgnano-Freggio, Osco, Faido, Calonico, Rossura, Tengia, Figgione and Sobrio-Ronzano are all listed in the Inventory of Swiss Heritage Sites.

The parish church of S. Siro is first mentioned in 1170, but probably dates back to the 11th century. It is one of the oldest churches in the Levantina valley. It was renovated in the 16th century and, later, the church tower was rebuilt in 1574–75. The new church had two naves and a rectangular choir. The facade retains some of the elements of the earlier church. Inside, there is a side altar from a German workshop that was built between 1510 and 1520. The walls also feature a mural from 1558 by Gerolamo Gorla da Milano and paintings from the 17th century.

== Politics ==
In the 2007 federal election the most popular party was the CVP which received 34.09% of the vote. The next three most popular parties were the FDP (29.09%), the Ticino League (14.64%) and the SP (14.04%). In the federal election, a total of 653 votes were cast, and the voter turnout was 55.5%.

In the 2007 Gran Consiglio election, there were a total of 1,151 registered voters in Faido, of which 892 or 77.5% voted. 10 blank ballots were cast, leaving 882 valid ballots in the election. The most popular party was the PPD+GenGiova which received 263 or 29.8% of the vote. The next three most popular parties were; the PLRT (with 217 or 24.6%), the SSI (with 175 or 19.8%) and the PS (with 105 or 11.9%).

In the 2007 Consiglio di Stato election, 4 blank ballots were cast, leaving 888 valid ballots in the election. The most popular party was the PPD which received 261 or 29.4% of the vote. The next three most popular parties were; the PLRT (with 224 or 25.2%), the SSI (with 145 or 16.3%) and the LEGA (with 120 or 13.5%).

== Economy ==
As of 2007, Faido had an unemployment rate of 3.86%. As of 2005, there were 54 people employed in the primary economic sector and about 19 businesses involved in this sector. 208 people were employed in the secondary sector and there were 24 businesses in this sector. 651 people were employed in the tertiary sector, with 97 businesses in this sector. There were 703 residents of the municipality who were employed in some capacity, of which females made up 40.0% of the workforce.

In 2000, there were 496 workers who commuted into the municipality and 260 workers who commuted away. The municipality is a net importer of workers, with about 1.9 workers entering the municipality for every one leaving. Of the working population, 8.1% used public transportation to get to work, and 51.3% used a private car.

As of 2009, there were 4 hotels in Faido with a total of 48 rooms and 94 beds.

== Religion ==
From the 2000 census, 1,189 or 76.8% were Roman Catholic, while 37 or 2.4% belonged to the Swiss Reformed Church. There are 263 individuals (or about 16.99% of the population) who belong to another church (not listed on the census), and 59 individuals (or about 3.81% of the population) did not answer the question.

== Weather ==
Faido has an average of 106.4 days of rain or snow per year and on average receives 1,416 mm (55.7 in) of precipitation. The wettest month is May during which time Faido receives an average of 151 mm (5.9 in) of rain or snow. During this month there is precipitation for an average of 11.8 days. The driest month of the year is December with an average of 67 mm (2.6 in) of precipitation over 7.4 days.

== Education ==
In Faido about 56.5% of the population (between age 25–64) have completed either non-mandatory upper secondary education or additional higher education (either university or a Fachhochschule).

In Faido there were a total of 305 students (as of 2009). The Ticino education system provides up to three years of non-mandatory kindergarten and in Faido there were 33 children in kindergarten. The primary school program lasts for five years and includes both a standard school and a special school. In the municipality, 79 students attended the standard primary schools and 4 students attended the special school. In the lower secondary school system, students either attend a two-year middle school followed by a two-year pre-apprenticeship or they attend a four-year program to prepare for higher education. There were 70 students in the two-year middle school and 0 in their pre-apprenticeship, while 34 students were in the four-year advanced program.

The upper secondary school includes several options, but at the end of the upper secondary program, a student will be prepared to enter a trade or to continue on to a university or college. In Ticino, vocational students may either attend school while working on their internship or apprenticeship (which takes three or four years) or may attend school followed by an internship or apprenticeship (which takes one year as a full-time student or one and a half to two years as a part-time student). There were 21 vocational students who were attending school full-time and 58 who attend part-time.

The professional program lasts three years and prepares a student for a job in engineering, nursing, computer science, business, tourism and similar fields. There were 6 students in the professional program.

As of 2000, there were 77 students in Faido who came from another municipality, while 113 residents attended schools outside the municipality.

== Crime ==
In 2014 the crime rate, of the over 200 crimes listed in the Swiss Criminal Code (running from murder, robbery and assault to accepting bribes and election fraud), in Faido was 38.4 per thousand residents. This rate is lower than average, only 70.8% of the rate in the district, 70.1% of the rate in the canton and 59.4% of the average rate in the entire country. During the same period, the rate of drug crimes was 2.7 per thousand residents. This rate is lower than the average for the canton and nation, only 30.7% of the cantonal rate and 27.3% of the national rate. The rate of violations of immigration, visa and work permit laws was 5.7 per thousand residents. This rate is about half of the rate in the district, but is over one and a half times the cantonal rate.

== Transport ==
Faido is served by the Faido station, as well as by the very infrequently served Lavorgo station. Both stations are within the municipal boundaries, and on the Gotthard railway.
