= Enrico Orelli =

Medieval Italian noble and rector

- Known for: Advocate of Blenio and rector
- Spouse: Daughter of Guido da Torre
- Parent: Guido (father)

Enrico Orelli (mentioned c. 1213–1239) was a medieval Italian nobleman who served as avogadro of Val Blenio and later as rector. He was a member of the Orelli family of Locarno.

== Life ==
At the death of his father, Guido Orelli, Enrico Orelli assumed the role of avogadro of Blenio (by 1213 at the latest), continuing a family tradition that had begun at the end of the previous century. He married a daughter of Guido da Torre, who was also the heiress to da Torre's feudal rights. The marriage made the Blenio branch of the Orelli family very wealthy.

The marriage had been arranged to resolve the conflict between the Orelli — avogadri appointed by the cathedral chapter of Milan — and the da Torre, who had been avogadri named by the emperor until the death of Alcherio in 1190/1204. Around 1229, Orelli also became rector. The conflicts between the pope and the emperor, and their repercussions on the political development of Val Blenio, eventually led the cathedral chapter to appoint rectors from Como as his successors (1239/1240).

== Bibliography ==
- Meyer, Blenio
- K. Meyer, Die Capitanei von Locarno im Mittelalter, 1916, pp. 158–162, 352
- H. Schulthess, Die von Orelli von Locarno und Zürich, 1941, pp. 18–19, 32
