= Alcherio da Torre =

Medieval advocate of Val Blenio

- Died: between c. 1190 and 1204

Alcherio da Torre was a medieval avogadro of the Val Blenio in what is now the canton of Ticino, Switzerland. He is attested from around 1160 and died between approximately 1190 and 1204. (Note: "Alcherio da Torre" in German, French and Italian in the online Historical Dictionary of Switzerland.)

== Career ==
Count Kuno of Lenzburg, appointed count of Val Blenio by Frederick Barbarossa to control access to the Lucomagno (Lukmanier) Pass, designated Alcherio as avogadro of the valley around 1160. Kuno, who governed through emissaries, visited Val Blenio only once, to hold a plaid at Sala, near Semione. Alcherio consequently acted with considerable independence as military commander and administrator of the county.

After the collapse of imperial power in Italy in 1167, Alcherio apparently retained his position even without the support of Counts Arnold and Ulrich IV of Lenzburg, who never visited the valley. Following the extinction of the Lenzburg line in 1173, Barbarossa entrusted him with the county of Blenio in exchange for an annual payment of 100 pounds. He was not, however, elevated to the rank of count, despite exercising judicial functions, and remained advocate. A payment made to an imperial envoy shows that Alcherio resisted the influence of the canons of Milan, who were enemies of the Empire at the time.

In 1176, Barbarossa met his army, which had crossed the Lukmanier, in Val Blenio and charged Alcherio with seizing the castle of Serravalle, held by supporters of the cathedral chapter of Milan. After the defeat of the imperial army at the Battle of Legnano the same year, Alcherio was forced to reconcile with the canons. In 1182, his son Artusio, leader of the imperial faction in conflict with the people of the valley, took refuge in the fortress of Curtero (the oath of Torre). A charter attests that Alcherio was dead by 1204. His son Guido stated in 1224 that his father had been deceased for more than thirty years at the time he had served as advocate.

== Bibliography ==
- F. Güterbock, Die Lukmanierstrasse und die Passpolitik der Staufer, 1908, pp. 1–24
- Meyer, Blenio
- A. Cavanna, G. Vismara, Il Patto di Torre, febbraio 1182, 1982
