= Anzonico =

- Former municipality
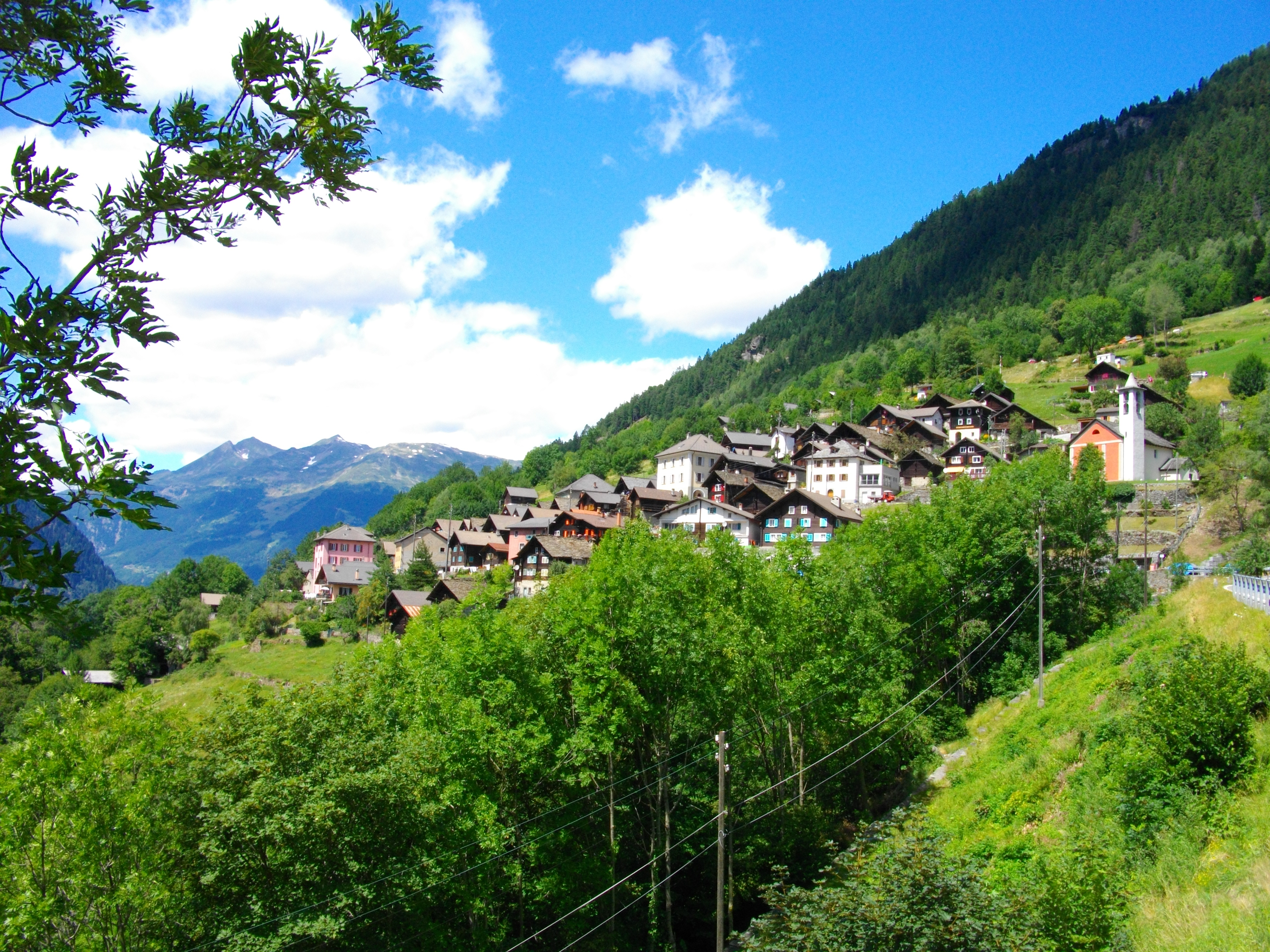
- Anzonico village

- Flag Coat of arms
- Location of Anzonico
- Location within Switzerland Location within Canton of Ticino
- Coordinates: 46°26′N 8°52′E
- Country: Switzerland
- Canton: Ticino
- District: Leventina

Area
  - Total: 10.6 km^{2} (4.1 sq mi)
- Elevation: 972 m (3,189 ft)

Population (December 2004)
  - Total: 105
  - Density: 9.91/km^{2} (25.7/sq mi)
- Time zone: UTC+01:00 (CET)
  - Summer (DST): UTC+02:00 (CEST)
- Postal code: 6748
- SFOS number: 5062
- ISO 3166 code: CH-TI
- Surrounded by: Acquarossa, Cavagnago, Chironico, Faido, Giornico
- Website: anzonico.ch

Anzonico is a former municipality in the district of Leventina in the canton of Ticino in Switzerland. On 1 April 2012, it was incorporated into the municipality of Faido along with the former municipalities of Calpiogna, Campello, Cavagnago, Chironico, Mairengo and Osco.

== History ==
Anzonico is first mentioned in 1226 as Ançonego. By 1229 it was listed a Degagna or associated farms to the greater Giornico area. It belonged to the parish of Giornico until the creation of a separate parish in 1602. The parish church of St. John the Baptist was first mentioned in 1404. The church, like most of the town was destroyed on 19 January 1667 by an avalanche. It was rebuilt in 1670 in a sheltered location. The population lived mostly through agriculture and livestock (sheep), though many temporarily emigrated for work. On the sun-drenched slopes of the mountains, the community's vineyards are found everywhere below 700 m (2,300 ft) in elevation. Starting in 1850, the population began to drop drastically. Many Rustici or traditional houses have been converted into apartments.

== Geography ==
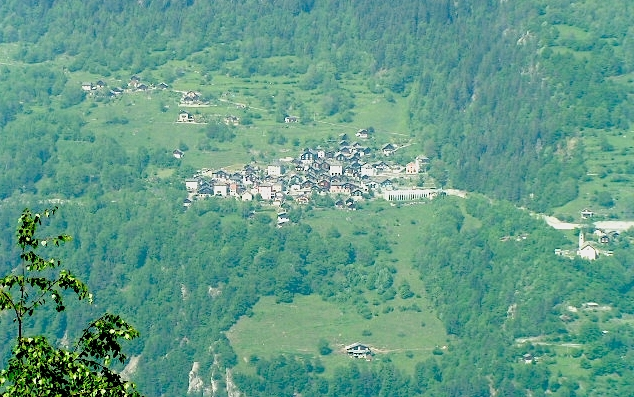
Anzonico

Aerial view from 1200 m by Walter Mittelholzer (1931)

Anzonico has an area, as of 1997, of 10.61 square kilometers (4.10 sq mi). Of this area, 0.39 km^{2} (0.15 sq mi) or 3.7% is used for agricultural purposes, while 7.19 km^{2} (2.78 sq mi) or 67.8% is forested. Of the rest of the land, 0.39 km^{2} (0.15 sq mi) or 3.7% is settled (buildings or roads), 0.04 km^{2} (9.9 acres) or 0.4% is either rivers or lakes and 1.77 km^{2} (0.68 sq mi) or 16.7% is unproductive land.

Of the built up area, housing and buildings made up 1.0% and transportation infrastructure made up 2.4%. Out of the forested land, 63.1% of the total land area is heavily forested and 4.3% is covered with orchards or small clusters of trees. Of the agricultural land, 2.5% is used for growing crops. All the water in the municipality is flowing water. Of the unproductive areas, 12.3% is unproductive vegetation and 4.3% is too rocky for vegetation.

The municipality is located in the Leventina district, near the Biaschina Loops of the Gotthard railway on the left side of the valley.

== Coat of arms ==
The blazon of the municipal coat of arms is Azure three chevrons Argent and in a chief of the last a mullet of eight Gules.

== Demographics ==
Anzonico has a population (as of December 2020) of 107. As of 2008, 19.8% of the population are foreign nationals. Over the last 10 years (1997–2007) the population has changed at a rate of -10.3%.

Most of the population (as of 2000) speaks Italian(83.7%), with Portuguese being second most common ( 5.1%) and German being third ( 5.1%). Of the Swiss national languages (as of 2000), 5 speak German, 3 people speak French, 82 people speak Italian. The remainder (8 people) speak another language.

As of 2008, the gender distribution of the population was 46.2% male and 53.8% female. The population was made up of 38 Swiss men (35.8% of the population), and 11 (10.4%) non-Swiss men. There were 48 Swiss women (45.3%), and 9 (8.5%) non-Swiss women. In 2008 there was 1 live birth to Swiss citizens and in same time span there was 1 death of Swiss citizens. The total Swiss population change in 2008 (from all sources) was an increase of 1 and the non-Swiss population remained constant. This represents a population growth rate of 1.0%.

The age distribution, as of 2009, in Anzonico is; 7 children or 6.6% of the population are between 0 and 9 years old and 0 teenagers between 10 and 19. Of the adult population, 5 people or 4.7% of the population are between 20 and 29 years old. 12 people or 11.3% are between 30 and 39, 6 people or 5.7% are between 40 and 49, and 17 people or 16.0% are between 50 and 59. The senior population distribution is 23 people or 21.7% of the population are between 60 and 69 years old, 21 people or 19.8% are between 70 and 79, there are 15 people or 14.2% who are over 80.

As of 2000 the average number of residents per living room was 0.49 which is fewer people per room than the cantonal average of 0.6 per room. In this case, a room is defined as space of a housing unit of at least 4 m^{2} (43 sq ft) as normal bedrooms, dining rooms, living rooms, kitchens and habitable cellars and attics. About 62.5% of the total households were owner occupied, or in other words did not pay rent (though they may have a mortgage or a rent-to-own agreement).

As of 2000, there were 48 private households in the municipality, and an average of 2 persons per household. In 2000 there were 188 single family homes (or 94.5% of the total) out of a total of 199 inhabited buildings. There were 5 two family buildings (2.5%) and 5 multi-family buildings (2.5%). There were also 1 buildings in the municipality that were multipurpose buildings (used for both housing and commercial or another purpose).

The vacancy rate for the municipality, in 2008, was 0%. In 2000 there were 214 apartments in the municipality. The most common apartment size was the 3 room apartment of which there were 69. There were 16 single room apartments and 43 apartments with five or more rooms. Of these apartments, a total of 48 apartments (22.4% of the total) were permanently occupied, while 164 apartments (76.6%) were seasonally occupied and 2 apartments (0.9%) were empty. As of 2007, the construction rate of new housing units was 9.5 new units per 1000 residents.

The historical population is given in the following table:

year	population
1570	320
1745	424
1850	328
1900	244
1950	148
1960	95
1970	96
1980	107
1990	95
2000	98

== Sights ==
The entire villaggio of Anzonico is designated as part of the Inventory of Swiss Heritage Sites

== Politics ==
In the 2007 federal election the most popular party was the FDP which received 37.26% of the vote. The next three most popular parties were the CVP (33.15%), the SP (20.55%) and the Ticino League (7.12%). In the federal election, a total of 47 votes were cast, and the voter turnout was 55.3%.

In the 2007 Gran Consiglio election, there were a total of 86 registered voters in Anzonico, of which 64 or 74.4% voted. The most popular party was the PLRT which received 22 or 34.4% of the vote. The next three most popular parties were; the PPD+GenGiova (with 18 or 28.1%), the PS (with 13 or 20.3%) and the SSI (with 6 or 9.4%).

In the 2007 Consiglio di Stato election, 1 blank ballot was cast, leaving 63 valid ballots in the election. The most popular party was the PLRT which received 21 or 33.3% of the vote. The next three most popular parties were; the PPD (with 19 or 30.2%), the PS (with 12 or 19.0%) and the SSI (with 7 or 11.1%).

== Economy ==
As of 2007, Anzonico had an unemployment rate of 1.42%. As of 2005, there were 16 people employed in the primary economic sector and about 6 businesses involved in this sector. 4 people were employed in the secondary sector and there was 1 business in this sector. 6 people were employed in the tertiary sector, with 4 businesses in this sector. There were 40 residents of the municipality who were employed in some capacity, of which females made up 45.0% of the workforce.

In 2000, there were no workers who commuted into the municipality and 25 workers who commuted away. Of the working population, 15% used public transportation to get to work, and 50% used a private car. As of 2009, there were 2 hotels in Anzonico.

== Religion ==
From the 2000 census, 82 or 83.7% were Roman Catholic, while 4 or 4.1% belonged to the Swiss Reformed Church. There are 9 individuals (or about 9.18% of the population) who belong to another church (not listed on the census), and 3 individuals (or about 3.06% of the population) did not answer the question.

== Education ==
In Anzonico about 55.4% of the population (between age 25–64) have completed either non-mandatory upper secondary education or additional higher education (either university or a Fachhochschule).

In Anzonico there were a total of 5 students (as of 2009). The Ticino education system provides up to three years of non-mandatory kindergarten and in Anzonico there were no children in kindergarten. The primary school program lasts for five years and includes both a standard school and a special school. In the municipality, 1 student attended the standard primary school and no students attended the special school. In the lower secondary school system, students either attend a two-year middle school followed by a two-year pre-apprenticeship or they attend a four-year program to prepare for higher education. There were no students in the lower secondary program.

The upper secondary school includes several options, but at the end of the upper secondary program, a student will be prepared to enter a trade or to continue on to a university or college. In Ticino, vocational students may either attend school while working on their internship or apprenticeship (which takes three or four years) or may attend school followed by an internship or apprenticeship (which takes one year as a full-time student or one and a half to two years as a part-time student). There were 0 vocational students who were attending school full-time and 2 who attend part-time.

The professional program lasts three years and prepares a student for a job in engineering, nursing, computer science, business, tourism and similar fields. There were 2 students in the professional program.

As of 2000, 7 residents attended schools outside the municipality.
