= Chironico =

- Former municipality
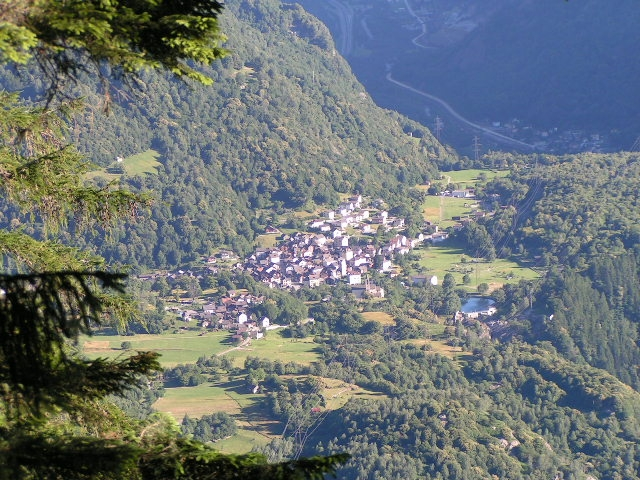

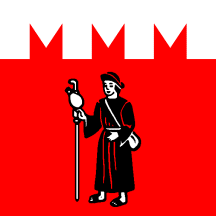
- Flag Coat of arms
- Location of Chironico
- Location within Switzerland Location within Canton of Ticino
- Coordinates: 46°25′N 8°51′E
- Country: Switzerland
- Canton: Ticino
- District: Leventina

Area
  - Total: 57.77 km^{2} (22.31 sq mi)
- Elevation: 786 m (2,579 ft)

Population (December 2004)
  - Total: 402
  - Density: 6.96/km^{2} (18.0/sq mi)
- Time zone: UTC+01:00 (CET)
  - Summer (DST): UTC+02:00 (CEST)
- Postal code: 6747
- SFOS number: 5070
- ISO 3166 code: CH-TI
- Surrounded by: Anzonico, Dalpe, Faido, Frasco, Giornico, Lavizzara, Sonogno
- Website: SFSO statistics

Chironico is a former municipality located in the district of Leventina in the canton of Ticino in Switzerland. On 1 April 2012, it was incorporated into the municipality of Faido along with the former municipalities of Anzonico, Calpiogna, Campello, Cavagnago, Mairengo and Osco.

== History ==
Chironico is first mentioned in 1202 as Cuirono. The village lies on a terrace that was partly created by a prehistoric landslide on the opposite side of the valley. The core of the settlement, is made up of the sections of Grumo and Nivo, the latter is the only one in the valley bottom. Above the village center, situated on steeply sloping rock terraces are the settlements of Cala, Doro, Olina, and Osadigo Chiesso. These poorly developed and almost entirely surrounded by farmland settlements are difficult to classify: it can not determine whether they are mountain pasture camps (maggenghi) or proper villages. The mountain village of Gribbio has a road connection, which however is not accessible in winter once the snows fall.

Most of the settlements have chapels that were built in the 16th-18th Centuries. In the past they were inhabited during a large part of the year, and during the Middle Ages may have been occupied year round. At one time they were of crucial importance for the economic and social life of the village, now they have been partially turned into holiday resorts. For centuries, many of the residents emigrated, initially to Italy and starting in the 19th Century to France and England.

From the old Vicinanza of Chironico, which included four or five Degagna, six municipal corporations (or patriziali) have emerged, though they are usually no longer owners of the pastures that they used to use.

In the main core of Chironico, with its typical block buildings, is the small church of S. Ambrogio with a medieval twin apsis and remarkable frescoes. Near the church is the Pedrini tower a six-story residential building probably dating from the first half of the 13th Century. On the outskirts of the village is the medieval parish church of S. Maurizio, in which some testimonies of immigrants who were working as innkeepers in Venice, and a valuable martyrology from 14th-15th Centuries is kept.

During the Middle Ages, the main mule track in the valley led through Chironico.

== Geography ==
Aerial view (1964)

Chironico has an area, as of 1997, of 57.77 square kilometers (22.31 sq mi). Of this area, 0.62 km^{2} (0.24 sq mi) or 1.1% is used for agricultural purposes, while 23.2 km^{2} (9.0 sq mi) or 40.2% is forested. Of the rest of the land, 0.57 km^{2} (0.22 sq mi) or 1.0% is settled (buildings or roads), 0.77 km^{2} (0.30 sq mi) or 1.3% is either rivers or lakes and 24.59 km^{2} (9.49 sq mi) or 42.6% is unproductive land.

Of the built up area, housing and buildings made up 0.4% and transportation infrastructure made up 0.5%. Out of the forested land, 25.2% of the total land area is heavily forested, while 12.7% is covered in small trees and shrubbery and 2.3% is covered with orchards or small clusters of trees. Of the agricultural land, 0.7% is used for growing crops. Of the water in the municipality, 0.4% is in lakes and 0.9% is in rivers and streams. Of the unproductive areas, 14.1% is unproductive vegetation and 28.5% is too rocky for vegetation.

The municipality is located in the Leventina district, on the right slope of the mid-Leventina valley at an elevation of 786 meters (2,579 ft). The municipality stretches from the Ticino river at the Biaschina-Schlucht (elevation 450 m (1,480 ft)) up to the Pizzo Campo Tencia (3,072 m (10,079 ft)) in the upper Piumogna valley. The core of the settlement, is made up of the sections of Grumo and Nivo, the latter is the only one in the valley bottom. Above the village center, situated on steeply sloping rock terraces are the settlements of Cala, Doro, Olina, and Osadigo Chiesso. The mountain village of Gribbio has a road connection.

== Coat of arms ==
The blazon of the municipal coat of arms is Gules a pilgrim clead Sable and a chief Argent lined with walls line embatteled "alla Ghibellina".

== Demographics ==
Chironico has a population (as of December 2020) of 394. As of 2008, 4.0% of the population are resident foreign nationals. Over the last 10 years (1997–2007) the population has changed at a rate of -7.3%.

Most of the population (as of 2000) speaks Italian(87.8%), with German being second most common ( 6.9%) and Serbo-Croatian being third ( 4.5%). Of the Swiss national languages (as of 2000), 28 speak German, 354 people speak Italian, and 1 person speaks Romansh. The remainder (20 people) speak another language.

As of 2008, the gender distribution of the population was 50.1% male and 49.9% female. The population was made up of 196 Swiss men (48.4% of the population), and 7 (1.7%) non-Swiss men. There were 193 Swiss women (47.7%), and 9 (2.2%) non-Swiss women.

In 2008 there was 1 live birth to Swiss citizens and 3 deaths of Swiss citizens. Ignoring immigration and emigration, the population of Swiss citizens decreased by 2 while the foreign population remained the same. The total Swiss population change in 2008 (from all sources) was a decrease of 6 and the non-Swiss population change was a decrease of 2 people. This represents a population growth rate of -2.0%.

The age distribution, as of 2009, in Chironico is; 26 children or 6.4% of the population are between 0 and 9 years old and 49 teenagers or 12.1% are between 10 and 19. Of the adult population, 37 people or 9.1% of the population are between 20 and 29 years old. 50 people or 12.3% are between 30 and 39, 72 people or 17.8% are between 40 and 49, and 56 people or 13.8% are between 50 and 59. The senior population distribution is 46 people or 11.4% of the population are between 60 and 69 years old, 38 people or 9.4% are between 70 and 79, there are 31 people or 7.7% who are over 80.

As of 2000 the average number of residents per living room was 0.56 which is about equal to the cantonal average of 0.6 per room. In this case, a room is defined as space of a housing unit of at least 4 m^{2} (43 sq ft) as normal bedrooms, dining rooms, living rooms, kitchens and habitable cellars and attics. About 76.1% of the total households were owner occupied, or in other words did not pay rent (though they may have a mortgage or a rent-to-own agreement).

As of 2000, there were 185 private households in the municipality, and an average of 2.2 persons per household. In 2000 there were 339 single family homes (or 85.2% of the total) out of a total of 398 inhabited buildings. There were 36 two family buildings (9.0%) and 13 multi-family buildings (3.3%). There were also 10 buildings in the municipality that were multipurpose buildings (used for both housing and commercial or another purpose).

The vacancy rate for the municipality, in 2008, was 0%. In 2000 there were 462 apartments in the municipality. The most common apartment size was the 4 room apartment of which there were 135. There were 38 single room apartments and 121 apartments with five or more rooms. Of these apartments, a total of 184 apartments (39.8% of the total) were permanently occupied, while 271 apartments (58.7%) were seasonally occupied and 7 apartments (1.5%) were empty. As of 2007, the construction rate of new housing units was 2.4 new units per 1000 residents.

The historical population is given in the following table:

year	population
1567	233
1745	565
1850	829
1880	1041
1900	855
1950	548
1990	393
2000	403

== Heritage sites of national significance ==
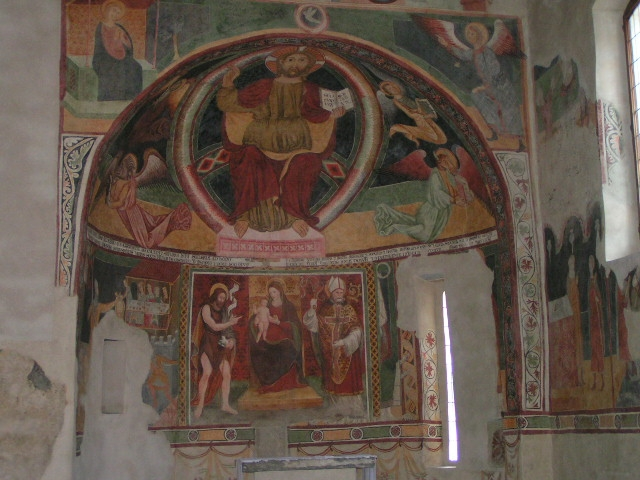
Church of S. Ambrogio

The Church of S. Ambrogio and the Torre Pedrini are listed as Swiss heritage site of national significance. The entire village of Chironico is listed as part of the Inventory of Swiss Heritage Sites

== Politics ==
In the 2007 federal election the most popular party was the CVP which received 43.92% of the vote. The next three most popular parties were the SP (19.37%), the FDP (13.95%) and the Ticino League (12.91%). In the federal election, a total of 224 votes were cast, and the voter turnout was 64.7%.

In the 2007 Gran Consiglio election, there were a total of 340 registered voters in Chironico, of which 271 or 79.7% voted. 2 blank ballots were cast, leaving 269 valid ballots in the election. The most popular party was the PPD+GenGiova which received 118 or 43.9% of the vote. The next three most popular parties were; the PS (with 45 or 16.7%), the PLRT (with 41 or 15.2%) and the SSI (with 31 or 11.5%).

In the 2007 Consiglio di Stato election, 2 blank ballots were cast, leaving 269 valid ballots in the election. The most popular party was the PPD which received 117 or 43.5% of the vote. The next three most popular parties were; the PS (with 47 or 17.5%), the PLRT (with 38 or 14.1%) and the LEGA (with 34 or 12.6%).

== Economy ==
As of 2007, Chironico had an unemployment rate of 1.75%. As of 2005, there were 34 people employed in the primary economic sector and about 12 businesses involved in this sector. 54 people were employed in the secondary sector and there were 5 businesses in this sector. 20 people were employed in the tertiary sector, with 9 businesses in this sector. There were 164 residents of the municipality who were employed in some capacity, of which females made up 34.1% of the workforce.

In 2000, there were 34 workers who commuted into the municipality and 98 workers who commuted away. The municipality is a net exporter of workers, with about 2.9 workers leaving the municipality for every one entering. Of the working population, 7.9% used public transportation to get to work, and 60.4% used a private car.

As of 2009, there was one hotel in Chironico.

== Religion ==
From the 2000 census, 342 or 84.9% were Roman Catholic, while 9 or 2.2% belonged to the Swiss Reformed Church. There are 48 individuals (or about 11.91% of the population) who belong to another church (not listed on the census), and 4 individuals (or about 0.99% of the population) did not answer the question.

== Education ==
In Chironico about 66.8% of the population (between age 25–64) have completed either non-mandatory upper secondary education or additional higher education (either University or a Fachhochschule).

In Chironico there were a total of 61 students (as of 2009). The Ticino education system provides up to three years of non-mandatory kindergarten and in Chironico there were 9 children in kindergarten. The primary school program lasts for five years and includes both a standard school and a special school. In the municipality, 13 students attended the standard primary schools and 0 students attended the special school. In the lower secondary school system, students either attend a two-year middle school followed by a two-year pre-apprenticeship or they attend a four-year program to prepare for higher education. There were 16 students in the two-year middle school and 0 in their pre-apprenticeship, while 10 students were in the four-year advanced program.

The upper secondary school includes several options, but at the end of the upper secondary program, a student will be prepared to enter a trade or to continue on to a university or college. In Ticino, vocational students may either attend school while working on their internship or apprenticeship (which takes three or four years) or may attend school followed by an internship or apprenticeship (which takes one year as a full-time student or one and a half to two years as a part-time student). There were 3 vocational students who were attending school full-time and 7 who attend part-time.

The professional program lasts three years and prepares a student for a job in engineering, nursing, computer science, business, tourism and similar fields. There were 3 students in the professional program.

As of 2000, there were 35 students from Chironico who attended schools outside the municipality.

== Sports and exercise ==
=== Rock climbing ===
One of the hardest boulder problems in the world (and the hardest in Switzerland), Alphane V17 (9A), is located in Chironico.
