= Dalpe =

- Municipality
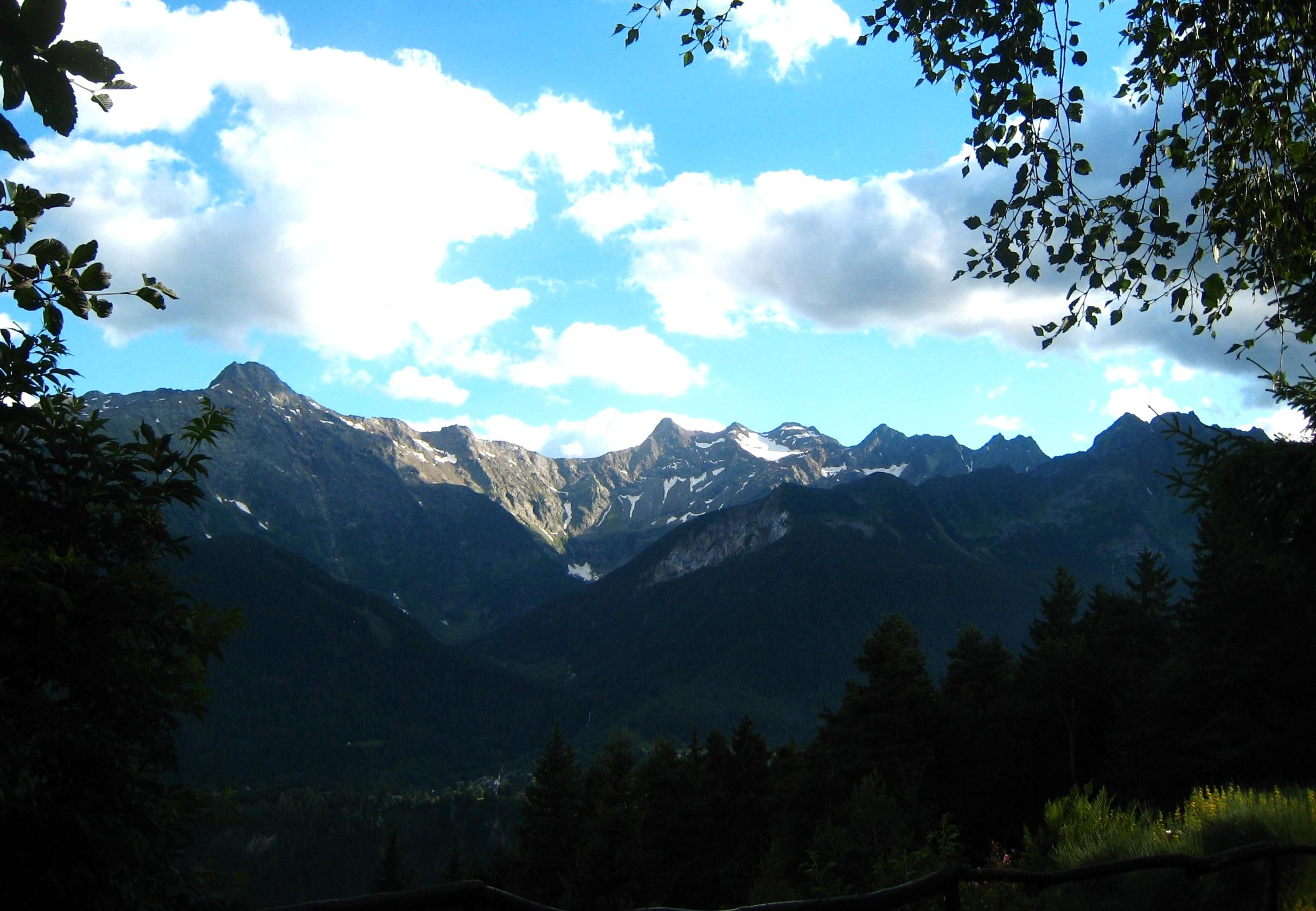
- Pizzo Campo Tencia (middle) above Dalpe

- Flag Coat of arms
- Location of Dalpe
- Location within Switzerland Location within Canton of Ticino
- Coordinates: 46°28′N 8°46′E
- Country: Switzerland
- Canton: Ticino
- District: Leventina

Government
  - Mayor: Sindaco

Area
  - Total: 14.5 km^{2} (5.6 sq mi)
- Elevation: 1,192 m (3,911 ft)

Population (December 2004)
  - Total: 171
  - Density: 11.8/km^{2} (30.5/sq mi)
- Time zone: UTC+01:00 (CET)
  - Summer (DST): UTC+02:00 (CEST)
- Postal code: 6774
- SFOS number: 5071
- ISO 3166 code: CH-TI
- Surrounded by: Chironico, Faido, Lavizzara, Mairengo, Osco, Prato (Leventina)
- Website: http://www.dalpe.ch SFSO statistics

Dalpe is a municipality in the district of Leventina in the canton of Ticino in Switzerland.

== History ==
In Dalpe a small cemetery from a 5th-century BC Golasecca culture settlement was discovered. Dalpe is first mentioned in 1217 as Albe. In the 13th century the Gotthard route went through Faido to Cornon and Prato. Dalpe and Cornon formed a Degagna within the Vicinanza of Prato.

The church is first mentioned in 1338, the church in Cornon is from the late 15th century. In 1640, Dalpe broke away from the parish of Prato and became an independent parish. The parish church of SS Bernardo e Carlo is from 1661.

In 1866, the Vicinanza of Dalpe separated from Prato and formed a separate civil parish. Due to emigration to France, the population decreased strongly in the 2nd half of the 19th century. It wouldn't increase until 1941–1960, when it increased slightly, due to the establishment of a construction company. Road construction starting in 1957 made Dalpe into an attractive summer resort in the Levantine and promoted the construction of second homes. The first road to the village opened in 1904. In 1940, a marble quarry opened, but closed shortly thereafter due to the war. For centuries cattle have been the main source of revenue, but now it employs only a few families. In 1998, the municipality began building a small hydroelectric power plant, which is fed by the river Piumogna.

== Geography ==
Aerial view (1954)

Dalpe has an area, as of 1997, of 14.52 square kilometers (5.61 sq mi). Of this area, 0.97 km^{2} (0.37 sq mi) or 6.7% is used for agricultural purposes, while 6.76 km^{2} (2.61 sq mi) or 46.6% is forested. Of the rest of the land, 0.22 km^{2} (0.085 sq mi) or 1.5% is settled (buildings or roads), 0.18 km^{2} (0.069 sq mi) or 1.2% is either rivers or lakes and 4.58 km^{2} (1.77 sq mi) or 31.5% is unproductive land.

Of the built up area, housing and buildings made up 1.2% and transportation infrastructure made up 0.2%. Out of the forested land, 38.3% of the total land area is heavily forested and 4.4% is covered with orchards or small clusters of trees. Of the agricultural land, 5.5% is used for growing crops and 1.2% is used for alpine pastures. Of the water in the municipality, 0.2% is in lakes and 1.0% is in rivers and streams. Of the unproductive areas, 12.1% is unproductive vegetation and 19.5% is too rocky for vegetation.

The municipality is located in the Leventina district, on a terrace at an elevation of 1,192 m (3,911 ft) above the Piottino. It consists of the village of Dalpe with the settlement of Cornone.

== Coat of arms ==
The blazon of the municipal coat of arms is Argent a cross Gules in canton a letter D of the same and overall a border Or. This is the same as the coat of arms of the Leventina district but with inverted colors and a letter D in place of the hand. The white background alludes to the name of the commune which appears on antique documents under the form Albe, derived from Latin Albus which means white.

== Demographics ==
As of 2025, Dalpe has a population of 188. As of 2008, 8.5% of the population are resident foreign nationals. Over the last 10 years (1997–2007) the population has changed at a rate of 0%.

Most of the population (as of 2000) speaks Italian (96.8%), with German being second most common ( 1.3%) and French being third ( 0.6%). Of the Swiss national languages (as of 2000), 2 speak German, 1 person speaks, French, 153 people speak Italian. The remainder (2 people) speak another language.

As of 2008, the gender distribution of the population was 51.4% male and 48.6% female. The population was made up of 81 Swiss men (44.8% of the population), and 12 (6.6%) non-Swiss men. There were 85 Swiss women (47.0%), and 3 (1.7%) non-Swiss women.

In 2008 there were 6 live births to Swiss citizens and there was 1 death of a Swiss citizen. Ignoring immigration and emigration, the population of Swiss citizens increased by 5 while the foreign population remained the same. There was 1 non-Swiss man who emigrated from Switzerland to another country and 1 non-Swiss woman who immigrated from another country to Switzerland. The total Swiss population change in 2008 (from all sources) was an increase of 7 and the non-Swiss population remained constant. This represents a population growth rate of 3.8%.

The age distribution, as of 2009, in Dalpe is; 10 children or 5.5% of the population are between 0 and 9 years old and 12 teenagers or 6.6% are between 10 and 19. Of the adult population, 26 people or 14.4% of the population are between 20 and 29 years old. 20 people or 11.0% are between 30 and 39, 15 people or 8.3% are between 40 and 49, and 39 people or 21.5% are between 50 and 59. The senior population distribution is 28 people or 15.5% of the population are between 60 and 69 years old, 21 people or 11.6% are between 70 and 79, there are 10 people or 5.5% who are over 80.

As of 2000, there were 70 private households in the municipality, and an average of 2.2 persons per household. In 2000 there were 179 single family homes (or 80.3% of the total) out of a total of 223 inhabited buildings. There were 22 two family buildings (9.9%) and 14 multi-family buildings (6.3%). There were also 8 buildings in the municipality that were multipurpose buildings (used for both housing and commercial or another purpose).

The vacancy rate for the municipality, in 2008, was 0%. In 2000 there were 278 apartments in the municipality. The most common apartment size was the 5 room apartment of which there were 93. There were 3 single room apartments and 93 apartments with five or more rooms. Of these apartments, a total of 70 apartments (25.2% of the total) were permanently occupied, while 205 apartments (73.7%) were seasonally occupied and 3 apartments (1.1%) were empty. As of 2007, the construction rate of new housing units was 0 new units per 1000 residents.

The historical population is given in the following table:

year	population
1602	227
1745	254
1850	481
1900	196
1941	129
1950	147
1960	202
2000	158

== Politics ==
In the 2007 federal election the most popular party was the FDP which received 32.35% of the vote. The next three most popular parties were the CVP (30.1%), the Ticino League (15.47%) and the SP (13.64%). In the federal election, a total of 93 votes were cast, and the voter turnout was 59.6%.

In the 2007 Gran Consiglio election, there were a total of 148 registered voters in Dalpe, of which 116 or 78.4% voted. 2 blank ballots were cast, leaving 114 valid ballots in the election. The most popular party was the PLRT which received 29 or 25.4% of the vote. The next three most popular parties were; the PLRT (with 29 or 25.4%), the PPD+GenGiova (with 26 or 22.8%) and the PS (with 13 or 11.4%).

In the 2007 Consiglio di Stato election, 1 blank ballot was cast, leaving 115 valid ballots in the election. The most popular party was the PPD which received 28 or 24.3% of the vote. The next three most popular parties were; the PLRT (with 27 or 23.5%), the LEGA (with 23 or 20.0%) and the LEGA (with 23 or 20.0%).

== Economy ==
As of 2007, Dalpe had an unemployment rate of 1.67%. As of 2005, there were 13 people employed in the primary economic sector and about 4 businesses involved in this sector. 42 people were employed in the secondary sector and there was 1 business in this sector. 8 people were employed in the tertiary sector, with 5 businesses in this sector. There were 78 residents of the municipality who were employed in some capacity, of which females made up 34.6% of the workforce.

In 2000, there were 36 workers who commuted into the municipality and 33 workers who commuted away. The municipality is a net importer of workers, with about 1.1 workers entering the municipality for every one leaving. Of the working population, 6.4% used public transportation to get to work, and 56.4% used a private car. As of 2009, there was one hotel in Dalpe.

== Religion ==
From the 2000 census, 145 or 91.8% were Roman Catholic, while 2 or 1.3% belonged to the Swiss Reformed Church. There are 9 individuals (or about 5.70% of the population) who belong to another church (not listed on the census), and 2 individuals (or about 1.27% of the population) did not answer the question.

== Education ==
In Dalpe about 70.6% of the population (between age 25 and 64) have completed either non-mandatory upper secondary education or additional higher education (either University or a Fachhochschule).

In Dalpe there were a total of 17 students (as of 2009). The Ticino education system provides up to three years of non-mandatory kindergarten and in Dalpe there was 1 child in kindergarten. The primary school program lasts for five years and includes both a standard school and a special school. In the municipality, 3 students attended the standard primary schools and 0 students attended the special school. In the lower secondary school system, students either attend a two-year middle school followed by a two-year pre-apprenticeship or they attend a four-year program to prepare for higher education. There were 5 students in the two-year middle school and 0 in their pre-apprenticeship, while 2 students were in the four-year advanced program.

The upper secondary school includes several options, but at the end of the upper secondary program, a student will be prepared to enter a trade or to continue on to a university or college. In Ticino, vocational students may either attend school while working on their internship or apprenticeship (which takes three or four years) or may attend school followed by an internship or apprenticeship (which takes one year as a full-time student or one and a half to two years as a part-time student). There were 4 vocational students who were attending school full-time and 1 who attend part-time.

The professional program lasts three years and prepares a student for a job in engineering, nursing, computer science, business, tourism and similar fields. There was 1 student in the professional program.
