= Simone Orelli =

Italian military captain (c.1220–c.1291)

- Born: c. 1220; Locarno
- Died: before 1291; Como
- Occupations: Military captain, administrator
- Known for: Military campaigns in northern Italy, support of the Visconti of Milan
- Family: Orelli family

Simone Orelli (c. 1220 – before 1291) was a military captain and administrator from Locarno who played a considerable role in the political and military conflicts of northern Italy during the 13th century. He contributed to the failure of imperial policy in the region and favored the establishment of the Visconti in Milan.

== Early life and family ==
Simone Orelli was born around 1220 in Locarno, the son of Guido, rector of Biasca. He was a cousin of Matteo Orelli. He served as rector of Biasca and Blenio for the cathedral chapter of Milan between 1242 and 1286.

== Military and political career ==
=== Guelph period and conflict with Frederick II ===
Initially a Guelph, Orelli became a sworn enemy of Frederick II in 1239 when imperial troops invaded the Ambrosian valleys, temporarily depriving him of his fief. That same year, he led the nobles of Locarno, liberated the city from the domination of Como and the emperor, and became podestà general of the pieve (large parish), which was subsequently governed by one of his representatives. In 1242, together with Heinrich von Sax, he besieged and captured Bellinzona, which was then administered by them in the name of Milan. Following the fall of Bellinzona, the upper valleys returned to the Orelli family, who recovered the advocacy and rectorate in Biasca and the Blenio valley. Following the peace concluded between Como and Milan, the Orelli lost control of Locarno and Bellinzona after 1249.

In 1245, at the head of a Milanese contingent, Orelli repelled Frederick II's attack at Gorgonzola and captured his son Enzio. These successes marked the peak of his military career. Upon the death of Frederick II in 1250, he joined the Ghibelline party and became one of its leaders in Milan.

=== Activities in other regions ===
Orelli was also active in other regions. In 1255, together with his cousins Guido and Matteo, he supported the struggle of the Grisons nobles against the bishop of Chur Heinrich von Montfort, an ally of the abbot of Disentis; this conflict ended with the peace treaty of 1261 between the Orelli and the abbot of Disentis. Between 1258 and 1261, he participated in the expedition of Peter II of Savoy against Henry I of Rarogne, Bishop of Sion.

=== Imprisonment and later career ===
In 1256, during the disorders between Guelphs and Ghibellines in Milan, Orelli remained loyal to Archbishop Ottone Visconti; he was exiled with him in 1259. As commander of the troops that entered Como in 1263 in the name of the new podestà Corrado da Venosta, Orelli was taken prisoner along with his nephew Guidoto and imprisoned for twelve years in a cage in Milan. Released in 1276 during a prisoner exchange between Guelphs and Ghibellines, he returned to his castle in Biasca and immediately renewed his alliance with the archbishop, whom he came to rescue.

In 1277, he fought again against the da Torre of Como, this time successfully. That year, the Guelphs were definitively defeated at Desio and the Visconti returned to Milan, resulting in Ghibelline domination over Como and Locarno. Orelli became captain general of the commune and the people, the archbishop's right-hand man, and played an important role in Milan's internal and external politics. Following what appears to have been a series of military defeats, his position weakened and he was removed from office a year and a half later.

=== Final years ===
Orelli temporarily settled in Como and allied himself with the Rusca. When they clashed with the Visconti, Orelli once again entered the service of the archbishop of Milan; he declared war on the Rusca in 1284 to reconquer Locarno, Bellinzona, and Lugano. The success was short-lived, and the cities were again abandoned in 1286 following the treaty between the Rusca and the Visconti, which definitively sidelined the aging Orelli. He died in Como shortly before 1291.
