= Campello, Switzerland =

Campello
- Former municipality
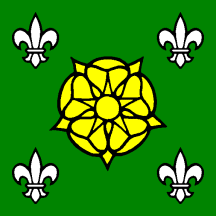
- Flag Coat of arms
- Location of Campello
- Location within Switzerland Location within Canton of Ticino
- Coordinates: 46°29′N 8°49′E
- Country: Switzerland
- Canton: Ticino
- District: Leventina

Area
  - Total: 3.96 km^{2} (1.53 sq mi)
- Elevation: 1,367 m (4,485 ft)

Population (December 2004)
  - Total: 58
  - Density: 15/km^{2} (38/sq mi)
- Time zone: UTC+01:00 (CET)
  - Summer (DST): UTC+02:00 (CEST)
- Postal code: 6760
- SFOS number: 5067
- ISO 3166 code: CH-TI
- Surrounded by: Blenio, Calpiogna, Faido
- Website: SFSO statistics

Campello is a former municipality in the district of Leventina in the canton of Ticino in Switzerland. On 1 April 2012, it was incorporated into the municipality of Faido along with the former municipalities of Anzonico, Calpiogna, Cavagnago, Chironico, Mairengo and Osco.

== History ==
Campello is first mentioned in 1400. According to the only partially confirmed tradition, the village emerged from the settlement of Fontanedo, which was completely abandoned by the mid-18th Century. Together with Calpiogna, Primadengo, Chinchengo and part of Faido, Campello belonged to the Degagna of Fichengo, which was one of the three Degagne that made up the Vicinanza of Faido. It became an independent municipality in 1853.

During the Middle Ages, Campello was the main town of the parish of Mairengo. In 1837 it was formed as an independent parish from the parish of Calpiogna. The parish church of S. Margherita, was built in 1632.

Throughout the 20th Century, a part of the population has emigrated to France (especially Lyon) and England. In the judicial district of Campello is the well-known village of Carì at an elevation of 1,622 m (5,322 ft) (originally Maiensäss), which, since 1950, has developed into one of the most popular alpine tourist resorts of the canton. It is now inhabited all year round, making Carì the highest permanent settlement in the Canton of Ticino.

== Geography ==
Campello has an area, as of 1997, of 3.96 square kilometers (1.53 sq mi). Of this area, 0.47 km^{2} (0.18 sq mi) or 11.9% is used for agricultural purposes, while 1.14 km^{2} (0.44 sq mi) or 28.8% is forested. Of the rest of the land, 0.2 km^{2} (0.077 sq mi) or 5.1% is settled (buildings or roads) and 1.05 km^{2} (0.41 sq mi) or 26.5% is unproductive land.

Of the built up area, housing and buildings made up 3.0% and transportation infrastructure made up 1.8%. Out of the forested land, 22.7% of the total land area is heavily forested and 2.0% is covered with orchards or small clusters of trees. Of the agricultural land, 8.8% is used for growing crops and 3.0% is used for alpine pastures. Of the unproductive areas, 20.7% is unproductive vegetation and 5.8% is too rocky for vegetation.

The municipality is located in the Leventina district, above Faido at an elevation of 1,362 m (4,469 ft) on the southern slope of the mid-Leventina valley. The municipality was created in 1853 when it separated from Calpiogna.

== Coat of arms ==
The blazon of the municipal coat of arms is Vert a rose Or between four fleurs-de-lis Argent.

== Demographics ==
Campello has a population (as of December 2020) of 55. As of 2008, 3.4% of the population are resident foreign nationals. Over the last 10 years (1997–2007) the population has changed at a rate of 7.1%.

Most of the population (as of 2000) speaks Italian (68.9%), with French being second most common (26.7%) and German being third (4.4%). Of the Swiss national languages (as of 2000), two speak German, 12 people speak French, 31 people speak Italian.

As of 2008, the gender distribution of the population was 54.8% male and 45.2% female. The population was made up of 33 Swiss men (53.2% of the population), and one (1.6%) non-Swiss man. There were 27 Swiss women (43.5%), and one (1.6%) non-Swiss woman.

In 2008, there were no live births in the municipality and there was one death of a Swiss citizen. Ignoring immigration and emigration, the population of Swiss citizens decreased by one while the foreign population remained the same. There was one Swiss man who immigrated back to Switzerland. The total Swiss population change in 2008 (from all sources) was a decrease of one and the non-Swiss population remained stable. This represents a population growth rate of −1.7%.

The age distribution, as of 2009, in Campello is; two children or 3.2% of the population are between 0 and 9-years-old and three teenagers or 4.8% are between 10 and 19. Of the adult population, 10 people or 16.1% of the population are between 20 and 29 years old. Seven people or 11.3% are between 30 and 39, 7 people or 11.3% are between 40 and 49, and nine people or 14.5% are between 50 and 59. The senior population distribution is 15 people or 24.2% of the population are between 60 and 69 years old, four people or 6.5% are between 70 and 79, and there are five people or 8.1% who are over 80.

As of 2000, the average number of residents per living room was 0.53 which is fewer people per room than the cantonal average of 0.6 per room. In this case, a room is defined as space of a housing unit of at least 4 m^{2} (43 sq ft) as normal bedrooms, dining rooms, living rooms, kitchens and habitable cellars and attics. About 54.5% of the total households were owner occupied, or in other words did not pay rent (though they may have a mortgage or a rent-to-own agreement).

As of 2000, there were 22 private households in the municipality, and an average of 2.0 persons per household. In 2000, there were 179 single family homes (or 80.6% of the total) out of a total of 222 inhabited buildings. There were 24 two-family buildings (10.8%) and 17 multi-family buildings (7.7%). There were also two buildings in the municipality that were multi-purpose buildings (used for both housing and commercial or another purpose).

The vacancy rate for the municipality, in 2008, was 0%. In 2000, there were 340 apartments in the municipality. The most common apartment size was the three-room apartment of which there were 115. There were 26 single room apartments and 74 apartments with five or more rooms. Of these apartments, a total of 22 apartments (6.5% of the total) were permanently occupied, while 318 apartments (93.5%) were seasonally occupied and zero apartments were empty. As of 2007, the construction rate of new housing units was zero new units per 1000 residents.

The historical population is given in the following table:

year	population
1639	68
1860	156
1900	146
1950	83
1990	44
2000	45

== Politics ==
In the 2007 federal election, the most popular party was the CVP which received 34.12% of the vote. The next three most popular parties were the Ticino League (23.99%), the SP (20.95%) and the FDP (18.58%). In the federal election, a total of 37 votes were cast, and the voter turnout was 64.9%.

In the 2007, Gran Consiglio election, there were a total of 55 registered voters in Campello, of which 41 or 74.5% voted. The most popular party was the PPD+GenGiova which received 14 or 34.1% of the vote. The next three most popular parties were; the PLRT (with eight votes or 19.5%), the PLRT (with eight votes or 19.5%) and the LEGA (with seven votes or 17.1%).

In the 2007, Consiglio di Stato election, the most popular party was the PPD which received 14 or 34.1% of the vote. The next three most popular parties were; the PLRT (with nine votes or 22.0%), the LEGA (with seven votes or 17.1%) and the LEGA (with even votes or 17.1%).

== Economy ==
As of 2007, Campello had an unemployment rate of 0.83%. As of 2005, there were three people employed in the primary economic sector and about one business involved in this sector. people were employed in the secondary sector and there were businesses in this sector. Seventeen people were employed in the tertiary sector, with 6 businesses in this sector. There were 20 residents of the municipality who were employed in some capacity, of which females made up 20.0% of the workforce.

In 2000, there were nine workers who commuted away. The municipality is an exporter of workers. Of the working population, 10% used public transportation to get to work, and 30% used a private car.

As of 2009, there were two hotels in Campello.

== Religion ==
From the 2000 census, 37 or 82.2% were Roman Catholic, while five or 11.1% belonged to the Swiss Reformed Church. There are two individuals (or about 4.44% of the population) who belong to another church (not listed on the census), and one individual (or about 2.22% of the population) did not answer the question.

== Education ==
The entire Swiss population is generally well educated. In Campello, about 62.5% of the population (between age 25–64) have completed either non-mandatory upper secondary education or additional higher education (either University or a Fachhochschule).

In Campello, there were a total of three students (as of 2009). The Ticino education system provides up to three years of non-mandatory kindergarten and in Campello there were children in kindergarten. The primary school program lasts for five years and includes both a standard school and a special school. In the municipality, students attended the standard primary schools and one student attended the special school. In the lower secondary school system, students either attend a two-year middle school followed by a two-year pre-apprenticeship or they attend a four-year program to prepare for higher education. There were no students in any lower secondary school.

The upper secondary school includes several options, but at the end of the upper secondary program, a student will be prepared to enter a trade or to continue on to a university or college. In Ticino, vocational students may either attend school while working on their internship or apprenticeship (which takes three or four years) or may attend school followed by an internship or apprenticeship (which takes one year as a full-time student or one and a half to two years as a part-time student). There was one vocational student who was attending school full-time and one who attend part-time.

As of 2000, there were six students from Campello who attended schools outside the municipality.
