= Leventina District =

Coordinates: 46°29′0″N 8°48′0″E

Leventina District Distretto di Leventina
- District
- Flag Coat of arms
- Country: Switzerland
- Canton: Ticino
- Capital: Faido

Area
  - Total: 479.57 km^{2} (185.16 sq mi)

Population (2020)
  - Total: 8,827
  - Density: 18.41/km^{2} (47.67/sq mi)
- Time zone: UTC+1 (CET)
  - Summer (DST): UTC+2 (CEST)
- Municipalities: 8

The Leventina District is one of the eight districts of the largely Italian-speaking canton of Ticino in Switzerland. The capital of the district is Faido but the largest town is Airolo on the southern flank of the Gotthard Pass.

Situated to the north of the canton, its territory covers the area of the river Ticino as far south as Biasca, in particular the Bedretto Valley and the Leventina Valley.

Leventina is divided into four sub-districts, termed 'circles' (Italian: circoli), and a total area of 479.57 km^{2} (185.16 sq mi) with a population of 8,827 (as of 31 December 2020). Its capital is the municipality (Italian: comune) of Faido. The valley became part of Switzerland on 5 March 1480, following the treaty of Lucerne with the Duchy of Milan.

== Geography ==
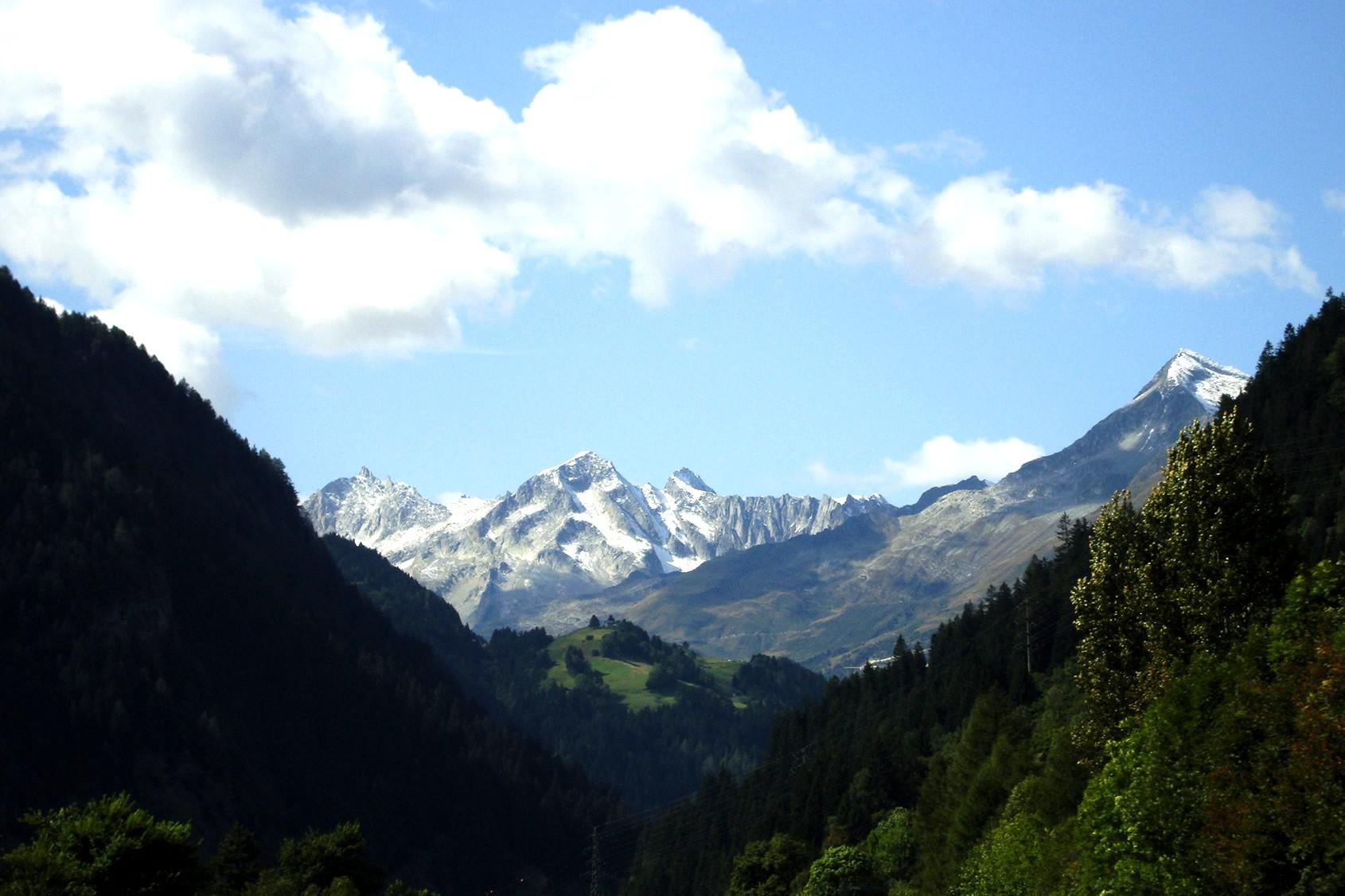
Leventina valley

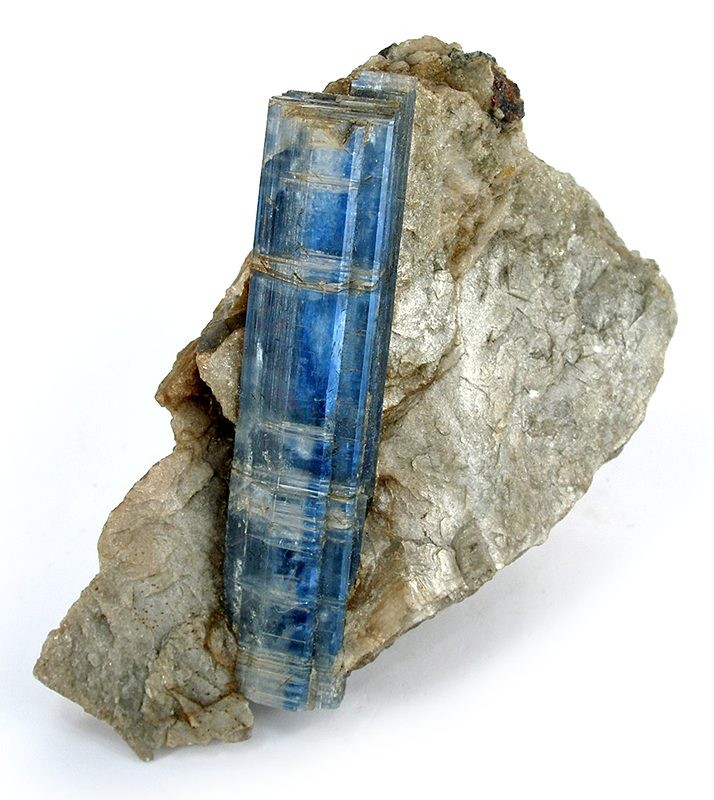
Kyanite specimen from Central St. Gotthard Massif, Leventina. This specimen features a 6 cm-long, doubly terminated kyanite in contrasting silvery mica matrix.

The Leventina District has an area, as of 1997, of 479.57 square kilometers (185.16 sq mi). Of this area, 20.05 km^{2} (7.74 sq mi) or 4.2% is used for agricultural purposes, while 175.08 km^{2} (67.60 sq mi) or 36.5% is forested. Of the rest of the land, 13.59 km^{2} (5.25 sq mi) or 2.8% is settled (buildings or roads), 9.26 km^{2} (3.58 sq mi) or 1.9% is either rivers or lakes and 175.23 km^{2} (67.66 sq mi) or 36.5% is unproductive land.

Of the built up area, housing and buildings made up 0.9% and transportation infrastructure made up 1.4%. Out of the forested land, 28.2% of the total land area is heavily forested and 2.3% is covered with orchards or small clusters of trees. Of the agricultural land, 3.2% is used for growing crops. Of the water in the district, 1.0% is in lakes and 1.0% is in rivers and streams. Of the unproductive areas, 16.5% is unproductive vegetation and 20.0% is too rocky for vegetation.

== Demographics ==
The Leventina District has a population (as of December 2020) of 8,827. Of the Swiss national languages (as of 2000), 304 speak German, 81 people speak French, 8,320 people speak Italian, and 4 people speak Romansh. The remainder (793 people) speak another language.

As of 2008, the gender distribution of the population was 52.4% male and 47.6% female. The population was made up of 3,378 Swiss men (34.4% of the population), and 1,772 (18.0%) non-Swiss men. There were 3,660 Swiss women (37.2%), and 1,024 (10.4%) non-Swiss women.

In 2008 there were 53 live births to Swiss citizens and 22 births to non-Swiss citizens, and in same time span there were 85 deaths of Swiss citizens and 12 non-Swiss citizen deaths. Ignoring immigration and emigration, the population of Swiss citizens decreased by 32 while the foreign population increased by 10. There were 2 Swiss men and 2 Swiss women who emigrated from Switzerland. At the same time, there were 22 non-Swiss men and 37 non-Swiss women who immigrated from another country to Switzerland. The total Swiss population change in 2008 (from all sources) was a decrease of 31 and the non-Swiss population change was a decrease of 74 people. This represents a population growth rate of -1.1%.

The age distribution, as of 2009, in the Leventina District is: 701 children or 7.1% of the population are between 0 and 9 years old and 899 teenagers or 9.1% are between 10 and 19. Of the adult population, 1,091 people or 11.1% of the population are between 20 and 29 years old. 1,251 people or 12.7% are between 30 and 39, 1,644 people or 16.7% are between 40 and 49, and 1,491 people or 15.2% are between 50 and 59. The senior population distribution is 1,204 people or 12.2% of the population are between 60 and 69 years old, 845 people or 8.6% are between 70 and 79, there are 708 people or 7.2% who are over 80.

In 2000 there were 8,691 single family homes (or 63.4% of the total) out of a total of 13,704 inhabited buildings. There were 1,860 two family buildings (13.6%) and 2,373 multi-family buildings (17.3%). There were also 780 buildings in the district that were multipurpose buildings (used for both housing and commercial or another purpose).

In 2000 there were 8,067 apartments in the district. The most common apartment size was the 4 room apartment of which there were 2,379. There were 452 single room apartments and 1,972 apartments with five or more rooms. Of these apartments, a total of 4,013 apartments (49.7% of the total) were permanently occupied, while 3,770 apartments (46.7%) were seasonally occupied and 284 apartments (3.5%) were empty.

The historical population is given in the following table:

year	population
1850	10,331
1880	14,972
1900	9,397
1950	9,602
1980	11,699
1990	10,032
2000	9,502

== Politics ==
In the 2007 federal election the most popular party was the CVP which received 33.52% of the vote. The next three most popular parties were the FDP (26.59%), the Ticino League (15.64%) and the SP (15.38%). In the federal election, a total of 3,468 votes were cast, and the voter turnout was 56.6%.

In the 2007 Ticino Gran Consiglio election, there were a total of 6,292 registered voters in the Leventina District, of which 4,599 or 73.1% voted. 54 blank ballots and 4 null ballots were cast, leaving 4,541 valid ballots in the election. The most popular party was the PPD+GenGiova which received 1,334 or 29.4% of the vote. The next three most popular parties were; the PLRT (with 1,113 or 24.5%), the SSI (with 756 or 16.6%) and the PS (with 582 or 12.8%).

In the 2007 Ticino Consiglio di Stato election, 35 blank ballots and 10 null ballots were cast, leaving 4,555 valid ballots in the election. The most popular party was the PPD which received 1,328 or 29.2% of the vote. The next three most popular parties were; the PLRT (with 1,114 or 24.5%), the LEGA (with 700 or 15.4%) and the SSI (with 652 or 14.3%).

== Religion ==
From the 2000 census, 7,815 or 82.2% were Roman Catholic, while 211 or 2.2% belonged to the Swiss Reformed Church. There are 1,197 individuals (or about 12.60% of the population) who belong to another church (not listed on the census), and 279 individuals (or about 2.94% of the population) did not answer the question.

== Education ==
In the Leventina District there was a total of 1,351 students (as of 2009). The Ticino education system provides up to three years of non-mandatory kindergarten and in the Leventina District there were 183 children in kindergarten. The primary school program lasts for five years and includes both a standard school and a special school. In the district, 387 students attended the standard primary schools and 22 students attended the special school. In the lower secondary school system, students either attend a two-year middle school followed by a two-year pre-apprenticeship or they attend a four-year program to prepare for higher education. There were 325 students in the two-year middle school and 9 in their pre-apprenticeship, while 110 students were in the four-year advanced program.

The upper secondary school includes several options, but at the end of the upper secondary program, a student will be prepared to enter a trade or to continue on to a university or college. In Ticino, vocational students may either attend school while working on their internship or apprenticeship (which takes three or four years) or may attend school followed by an internship or apprenticeship (which takes one year as a full-time student or one and a half to two years as a part-time student). There were 97 vocational students who were attending school full-time and 193 who attend part-time.

The professional program lasts three years and prepares a student for a job in engineering, nursing, computer science, business, tourism and similar fields. There were 25 students in the professional program.

== Circles and municipalities ==
Circolo di Airolo
Coat of arms	Municipality	Population (31 December 2020)	Area km^{2}
	Airolo	1,476	94.37
	Bedretto	102	75.23
	Total	1,578	169.7

Circolo di Faido
Coat of arms	Municipality	Population (31 December 2020)	Area km^{2}
	Faido	2,823	132.6
	Total	2,823	132.6

Circolo di Giornico
Coat of arms	Municipality	Population (31 December 2020)	Area km^{2}
	Giornico	806	19.48
	Personico	326	39.04
	Pollegio	800	5.89
	Total	2,869	70.85

Circolo di Quinto
Coat of arms	Municipality	Population (31 December 2020)	Area km^{2}
	Dalpe	174	14.52
	Quinto	995	75.2
	Total	1,557	106.6
