= Pollegio =

- Municipality
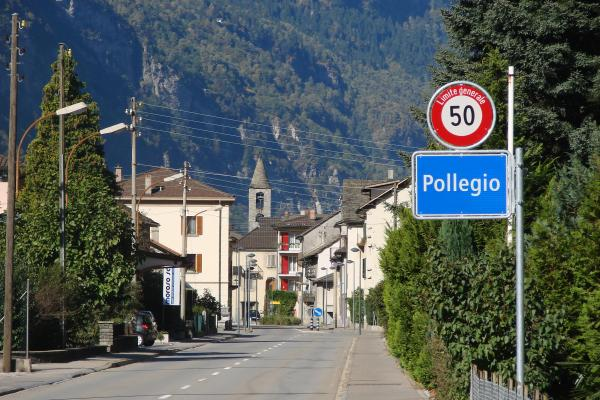
- Pollegio village

- Flag Coat of arms
- Location of Pollegio
- Location within Switzerland Location within Canton of Ticino
- Coordinates: 46°21′N 8°56′E
- Country: Switzerland
- Canton: Ticino
- District: Leventina

Government
  - Mayor: Sindaco

Area
  - Total: 5.89 km^{2} (2.27 sq mi)
- Elevation: 298 m (978 ft)

Population (December 2004)
  - Total: 992
  - Density: 168/km^{2} (436/sq mi)
- Time zone: UTC+01:00 (CET)
  - Summer (DST): UTC+02:00 (CEST)
- Postal code: 6742
- SFOS number: 5077
- ISO 3166 code: CH-TI
- Surrounded by: Biasca, Bodio, Personico, Semione
- Website: www.pollegio.ch

Pollegio (Lombard: Puléisg) is a municipality in the district of Leventina in the canton of Ticino in Switzerland, located in the lower Leventina (valley crossed by the river Ticino).

== History ==
Pollegio is first mentioned around 1237 as Poleccio/Puletio though this comes from an 18th-century copy of the original document. In 1256 it was mentioned as de Polecci. It used to be known by the German name of Klösterli, though this is not used anymore. In the Middle Ages Pollegio belonged to the Vicinanza of Giornico. The village church was part of the Bodio parish (another member of the Vicinanza of Giornico) until 1602, when it became an independent parish. The Church of SS. MM. Innocenti was built after the Battle of Giornico (which took place in 1478), in memory of the fallen. It was renovated in the 17th century, in 1840 and in 1990.

=== Early history ===
In the early centuries, there were two local centers: the mountain community of Saymola (Simbra, Symora) (probably the oldest of the two) and the other on the valley floor. The small village was part of the Commune of Leventina (with villages in the valley) and over the Novena pass to the Moleno river. The Leventina was given in 945 to the Canons of the Cathedral of Milan, who held it until 1403 when it passed into the hands of Uri. The municipality was formed by ten Vicinie. Pollegio with Bodio and the mountain of Sobrio, were part of the Vicinanza of Giornico. The location at the intersection of the Three Ambrosian Rite Valleys, led to the creation, between 1210 and 1236, of a hospice for travelers known as the "Hospitale de Santa Maria in Campo Canino de Pollezio de gli Humiliati", directed by the religious order of the Humiliati. After 1326, the hospice was called a "monastery", under the direction of the Humiliati. In 1422 the Confederates met in Pollegio to swear an oath before the Battle of Arbedo. Moreover, from Pollegio, the Confederates sent a declaration of war to the Duke of Milan. In 1478 after the Battle of Giornico of 28 December (which occurred in the territories between Bodio and Pollegio) the Confederates buried their dead in Pollegio. In the following years, they built an ossuary which was later replaced with a Church devoted to the Santissimi Martiri Innocenti (Most Holy Innocent Martyrs). Until then, the only available church was the Church of St. Mary attached to the Humiliati hospice and monastery. The church was later transformed into a parish church (of the Ambrosian Rite and dedicated to the Innocent Martyrs). 28 December, the date of battle, became the patron saint's day. Later, the Confraternity (founded by San Carlo Borromeo as a Blessed Sacrament Confraternity and later erected to the glory of St. Anthony of Padua) added a new patron saint's day 13 June based on popular devotion to St. Anthony of Padua. The church, with a single nave and a barrel vault, was renovated in the Baroque style in the 18th century and further renovated in the 19th and mid-20th centuries.

In 1567, all the villages (members of the Vicinanza) of Giornico asked San Carlo Borromeo to give them the independence from the parish of Bodio, but without success. However, in 1602 Federico Borromeo decided in favor of the separation and Pollegio finally became an independent parish.

=== The Seminary of Pollegio ===
On 6 June 1622, Federico Borromeo officially erected the Seminary of Pollegio using the assets of the suppressed order of Humiliati, and on 16 July 1626 he determined its rules of conduct. The foundation act was signed at the headquarters of the Archdiocese of Milan, in the presence of Uri and Leventina authorities. During 1673 and 1682 it was closed as a result of floods caused by rivers Brenno and Ticino. In 1683 the seminary resumed its educational activity, but between 1787 and 1796 there were additional closures following the temporary abolition of the Archbishop's seminary of Milan. In 1851 the Seminary of Pollegio was closed by a body of soldiers under the Council of State. Following this, the mayor of Pollegio was appointed as provisional administrator.

==== The teaching staff and students ====
The Seminary was governed by a rector who belonged to the congregation of the Oblates of Saint Ambrose and Charles founded by Carlo Borromeo in 1578. The line, known as "dozen", varied depending on the cost of living, at the end of 17th century was introduced a line "economy" to make education accessible to more students, equivalent to less than a quarter of the normal: those who chose this mode were called "menestrante" as the housing and received a bowl of soup, the rest of the food had to be taken from home and have it cooked by the chef of the seminary. Carlo Borromeo had set up five free seats for the youth of Leventina to become seminarians. Half of the students came from this valley, about a third from the Blenio Valley, one tenth of the Riviera. Other students came from the Swiss cantons (Uri especially) to learn the Italian language and from different locations, including Graubünden, Ticino and Lombardy.

==== Rules and studies ====
The school year began in November and ended in July. Sunday and Thursday afternoons were the days of vacation, as students had to speak in Latin, except that in moments of recreation and after dinner. For books, a student would have had a dictionary, a handbook of grammar and a short treatise in vogue in the schools of the spiritual, the author studied the most was Cicero.

==== Everyday Life ====
Thanks to the documents scattered in various archives there is some information about the food consumed by students and teaching staff: Cereals - rye, wheat mile and barley - came from the seminar and possessions from the property to Cardana (province of Varese). They also ate chestnuts, dried and fresh beans, beans, nuts, cheese (from Airolo by Iragna and the canton of Uri and the Schwyz), butter was used as a condiment. The wine was equivalent to 27% of food expenditure. the meat was mostly white: in 1697/98 had cooked 25 calf, two heifers, some lamb, some pigs and 23 chickens. In addition: fish, perch and tench and the fish of the river Ticino, where the seminary had a fish pond that they rented. The menu of 1697 also included apples, pears, strawberries, fruit, salt, lemon candies, cookies, candies, anicini, sugar, spices, cream, mascarpone, 950 snails, anchovies and 1174 eggs.

==== Nationalization ====
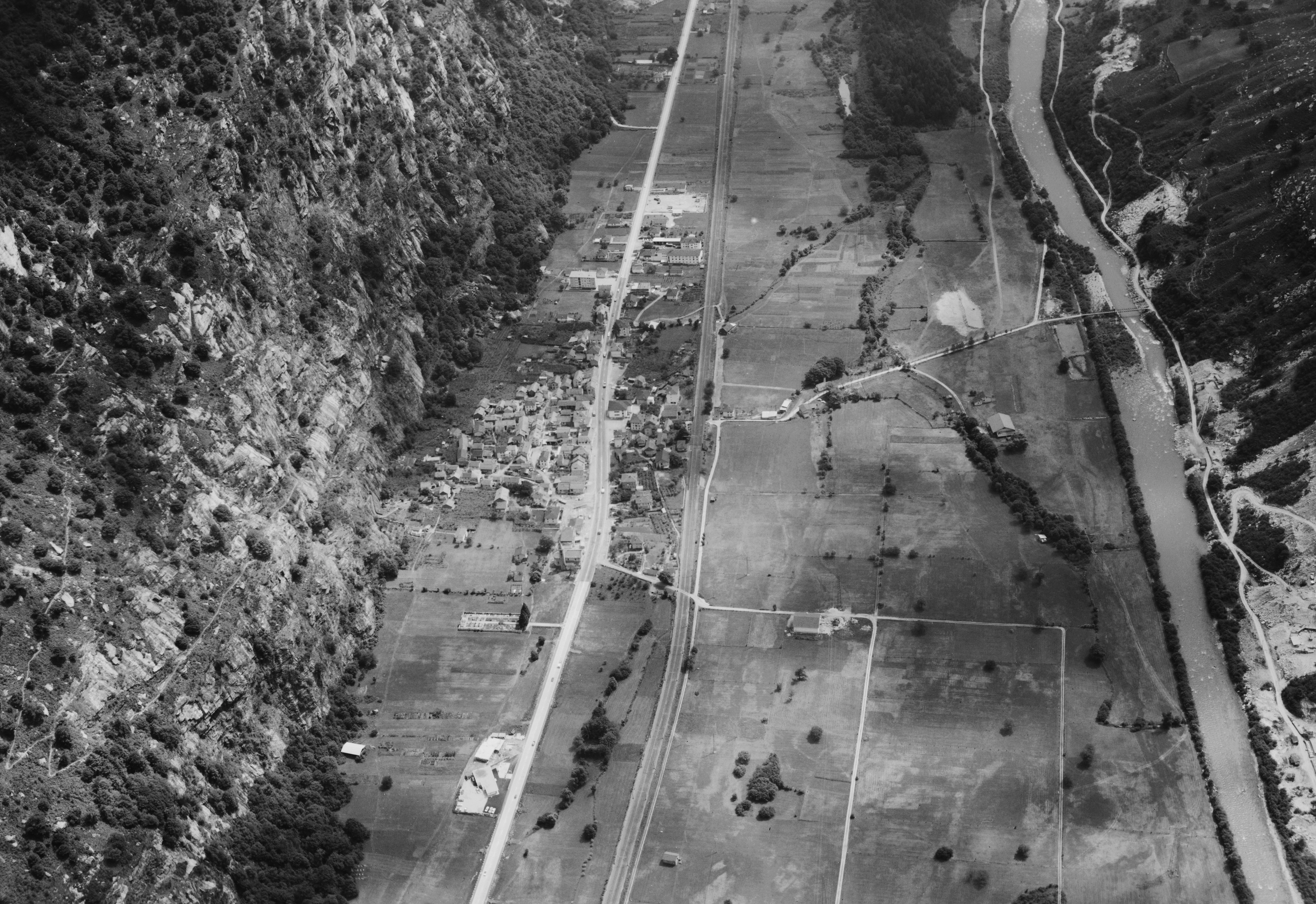
Aerial view (1964)

In 1852 the Grand Council launched an act of secularism about religious institutions which affected the Seminary of Pollegio too, making it owned by the State. It was then transformed into a lay school in 1873. On 29 January 1873 the School of Science was established in the canton of Ticino that lasted until 1878. The men's section was moved to Locarno while the female remained in Pollegio until 1881. In 1884 the Diocese of Lugano was created, and in Pollegio was installed the Gymnasium section of the diocesan seminary; which in 1919 was transferred to Lugano. Among his students figured Stefano Franscini by Bodio.

=== The Patricianship ===
The Patricianship includes all families originating in the place that once administered the undistributed assets of the community such as forests, grasslands, mountains, the Alps and are responsible for the maintenance of the artifacts, roads, bridges, trails, springs and fountains. From the second half of the 20th century you may also include the children of a married to a non-patrician patrician patrician wives and married to a non-patrician.

=== 20th century in Pollegio ===
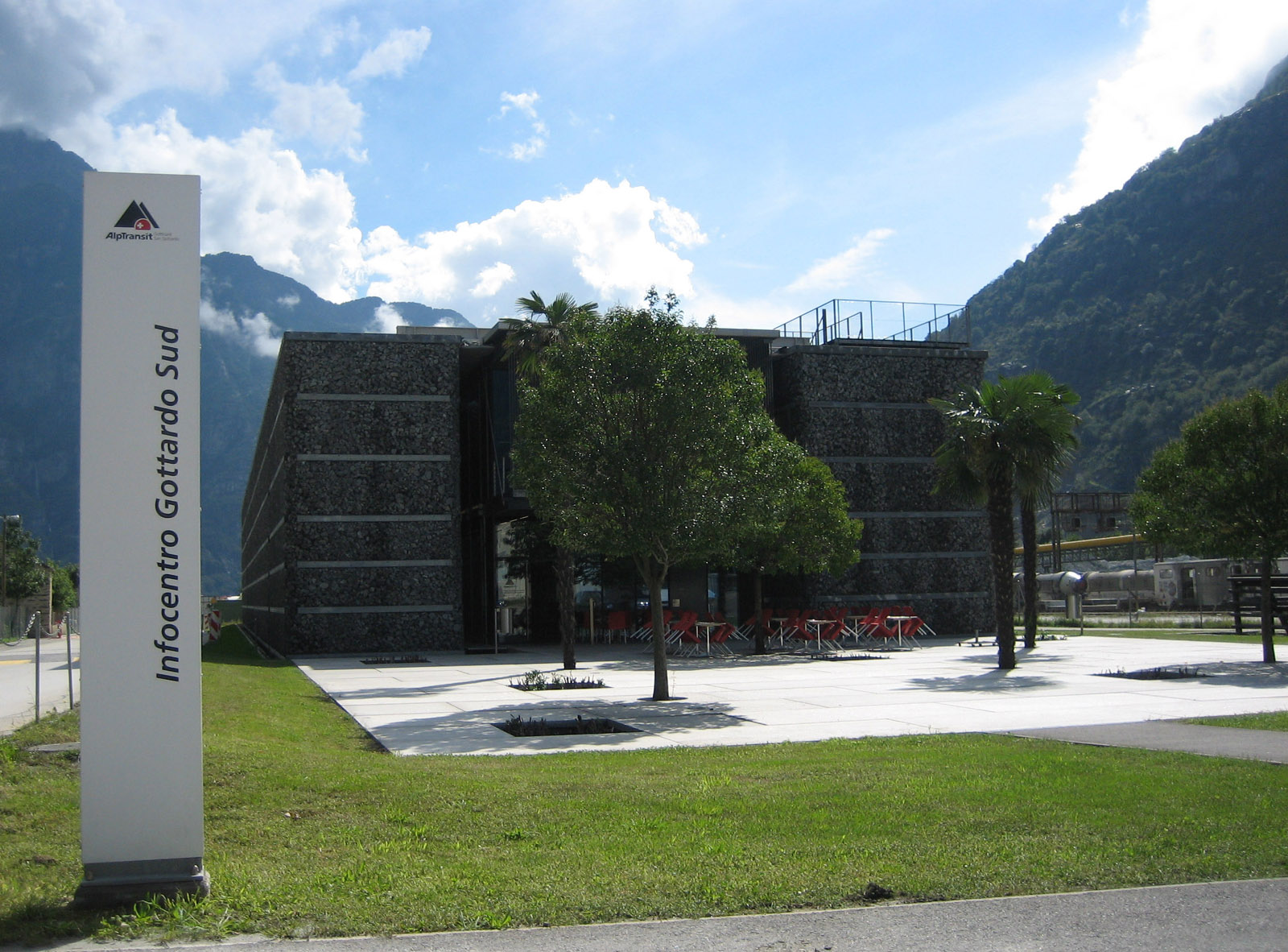
Information center for the Gotthard Base Tunnel

The traditional economy was based on agriculture and livestock, with granite mining starting in the 19th century. In 1999, construction on the new Gotthard Base Tunnel began, starting in the area between Pollegio and Bodio. In 2002–03, an information center for the project was set up.

== Geography ==
Pollegio has an area, as of 1997, of 5.89 square kilometers (2.27 sq mi). Of this area, 0.96 km^{2} (0.37 sq mi) or 16.3% is used for agricultural purposes, while 3.95 km^{2} (1.53 sq mi) or 67.1% is forested. Of the rest of the land, 0.61 km^{2} (0.24 sq mi) or 10.4% is settled (buildings or roads), 0.1 km^{2} (25 acres) or 1.7% is either rivers or lakes and 0.42 km^{2} (0.16 sq mi) or 7.1% is unproductive land.

Of the built up area, housing and buildings made up 3.1% and transportation infrastructure made up 5.4%. Out of the forested land, 60.8% of the total land area is heavily forested and 3.7% is covered with orchards or small clusters of trees. Of the agricultural land, 11.5% is used for growing crops, while 1.7% is used for orchards or vine crops and 3.1% is used for alpine pastures. All the water in the municipality is flowing water. Of the unproductive areas, 2.4% is unproductive vegetation and 4.8% is too rocky for vegetation.

The municipality is located in the Leventina district. It consists of the village of Pollegio and the hamlet of Pasquerio.

== Coat of arms ==
The blazon of the municipal coat of arms is a Cardinal's cap and three five-pointed red stars (Or an archbishop's cap Gules and in chief three mullets of the second fesswise.)

== Demographics ==
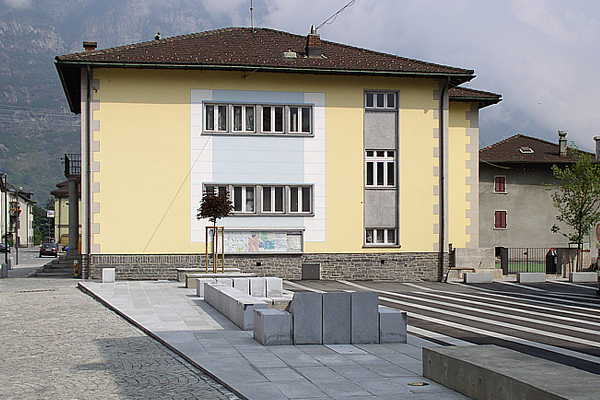
Municipal administration building

Pollegio has a population (as of December 2020) of 800. As of 2008, 47.6% of the population are resident foreign nationals. Over the last 10 years (1997–2007) the population has changed at a rate of 17.2%.

Most of the population (as of 2000) speaks Italian (90.2%), with Portuguese being second most common (3.6%) and German being third (2.2%). Of the Swiss national languages (as of 2000), 16 speak German, 10 people speak French, 652 people speak Italian. The remainder (45 people) speak another language.

As of 2008, the gender distribution of the population was 60.9% male and 39.1% female. The population was made up of 214 Swiss men (24.9% of the population), and 310 (36.0%) non-Swiss men. There were 232 Swiss women (26.9%), and 105 (12.2%) non-Swiss women.

In 2008 there were no live births to Swiss citizens and 3 births to non-Swiss citizens, and in same time span there were 8 deaths of Swiss citizens and 2 non-Swiss citizen deaths. Ignoring immigration and emigration, the population of Swiss citizens decreased by 8 while the foreign population increased by 1. There was 1 non-Swiss man and 1 non-Swiss woman who immigrated from another country to Switzerland. The total Swiss population change in 2008 (from all sources) was an increase of 1 and the non-Swiss population change was a decrease of 25 people. This represents a population growth rate of -2.7%.

The age distribution, as of 2009, in Pollegio is; 51 children or 5.9% of the population are between 0 and 9 years old and 87 teenagers or 10.1% are between 10 and 19. Of the adult population, 91 people or 10.6% of the population are between 20 and 29 years old. 121 people or 14.1% are between 30 and 39, 188 people or 21.8% are between 40 and 49, and 143 people or 16.6% are between 50 and 59. The senior population distribution is 88 people or 10.2% of the population are between 60 and 69 years old, 50 people or 5.8% are between 70 and 79, there are 42 people or 4.9% who are over 80.

As of 2000, there were 284 private households in the municipality, and an average of 2.4 persons per household. In 2000 there were 185 single family homes (or 72.3% of the total) out of a total of 256 inhabited buildings. There were 38 two family buildings (14.8%) and 13 multi-family buildings (5.1%). There were also 20 buildings in the municipality that were multipurpose buildings (used for both housing and commercial or another purpose).

The vacancy rate for the municipality in 2008 was 3.41%. In 2000 there were 351 apartments in the municipality. The most common apartment size was the 3-room apartment of which there were 110. There were 16 single room apartments and 81 apartments with five or more rooms. Of these apartments, a total of 278 apartments (79.2% of the total) were permanently occupied, while 60 apartments (17.1%) were seasonally occupied and 13 apartments (3.7%) were empty. As of 2007, the construction rate of new housing units was 0 new units per 1000 residents.

The historical population is given in the following table:

year	population
1567	50 Hearths
1602	316
1745	279
1850	468
1900	531
1950	483
2000	723

== Politics ==
In the 2007 federal election, the most popular party was the SP which received 36.47% of the vote. The next three most popular parties were the CVP (29.18%), the Ticino League (12.84%) and the FDP (10.65%). In the federal election, a total of 175 votes were cast, and the voter turnout was 46.4%.

In the 2007 Gran Consiglio election, there were a total of 373 registered voters in Pollegio, of which 264 or 70.8% voted. 1 blank ballot was cast, leaving 263 valid ballots in the election. The most popular party was the PS which received 92 or 35.0% of the vote. The next three most popular parties were; the PPD+GenGiova (with 68 or 25.9%), the SSI (with 41 or 15.6%) and the LEGA (with 26 or 9.9%).

In the 2007 Consiglio di Stato election, 1 blank ballot was cast, leaving 263 valid ballots in the election. The most popular party was the PS which received 90 or 34.2% of the vote. The next three most popular parties were; the PPD (with 64 or 24.3%), the LEGA (with 40 or 15.2%) and the PLRT (with 31 or 11.8%).

== Economy ==
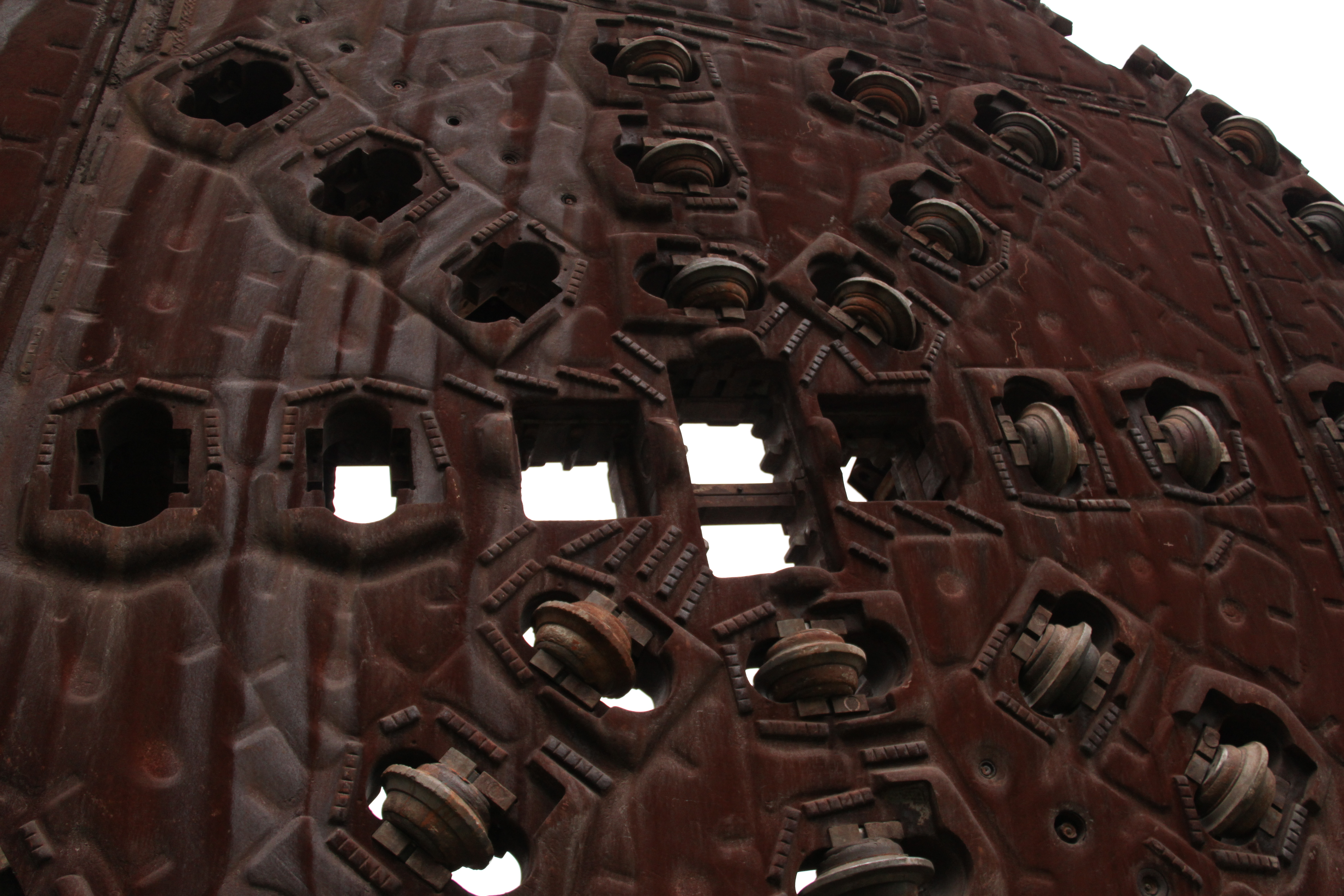
Used drill head of the tunnel boring machine, drilling the Gotthard Base Tunnel

As of 2007, Pollegio had an unemployment rate of 4.39%. As of 2005, there were 14 people employed in the primary economic sector and about 4 businesses involved in this sector. 308 people were employed in the secondary sector and there were 8 businesses in this sector. 73 people were employed in the tertiary sector, with 24 businesses in this sector. There were 363 residents of the municipality who were employed in some capacity, of which females made up 33.3% of the workforce.

In 2000, there were 95 workers who commuted into the municipality and 269 workers who commuted away. The municipality is a net exporter of workers, with about 2.8 workers leaving the municipality for every one entering. Of the working population, 6.9% used public transportation to get to work, and 65.6% used a private car. As of 2009, there was one hotel in Pollegio.

== Religion ==
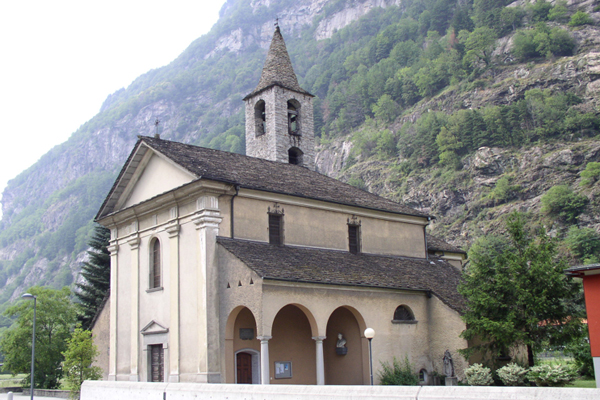
Church in Pollegio

From the 2000 census, 631 or 87.3% were Roman Catholic, while 9 or 1.2% belonged to the Swiss Reformed Church. There are 57 individuals (or about 7.88% of the population) who belong to another church (not listed on the census), and 26 individuals (or about 3.60% of the population) did not answer the question.

== Born in Pollegio ==
Luigi Imperatori (1844–1900), one of the most famous pedagogists and theologians of Canton Ticino, teacher and doctor of theology, an important contributor to the catholic newspapers: "Catholic Believer" and "Freedom." First Director of the magistral school of Canton Ticino, from 1888 to 1900.

== Education ==
In Pollegio about 48.8% of the population (between age 25-64) have completed either non-mandatory upper secondary education or additional higher education (either university or a Fachhochschule).

In Pollegio, there were a total of 116 students (as of 2009). The Ticino education system provides up to three years of non-mandatory kindergarten and in Pollegio there were 14 children in kindergarten. The primary school program lasts for five years and includes both a standard school and a special school. In the municipality, 37 students attended the standard primary schools and 3 students attended the special school. In the lower secondary school system, students either attend a two-year middle school followed by a two-year pre-apprenticeship or they attend a four-year program to prepare for higher education. There were 27 students in the two-year middle school and 2 in their pre-apprenticeship, while 10 students were in the four-year advanced program.

The upper secondary school includes several options, but at the end of the upper secondary program, a student will be prepared to enter a trade or to continue on to a university or college. In Ticino, vocational students may either attend school while working on their internship or apprenticeship (which takes three or four years) or may attend school followed by an internship or apprenticeship (which takes one year as a full-time student or one and a half to two years as a part-time student). There were 8 vocational students who were attending school full-time and 13 who attend part-time.

The professional program lasts three years and prepares a student for a job in engineering, nursing, computer science, business, tourism and similar fields. There were 2 students in the professional program.

As of 2000, there were 56 students from Pollegio who attended schools outside the municipality.

== Main sources ==
Professor Roberto Forni and Michele Guerra
