= Imperatori =

Imperatori is a surname. Notable people with the surname include:

- Alexandre Imperatori (born 1987), Swiss racing driver
- Luigi Imperatori (1844–1900), Swiss Roman Catholic theologian
- Micaela Imperatori (born 1972), Italian rhythmic gymnast
