= Castelgrande =

Castelgrande may refer to:

- Castelgrande, Basilicata, a town in the Province of Potenza, Italy
- Castelgrande (castle), one of the Three Castles of Bellinzona, Switzerland
