= Transalpine campaigns of the Old Swiss Confederacy =

15–16th century military campaigns south of the Alps

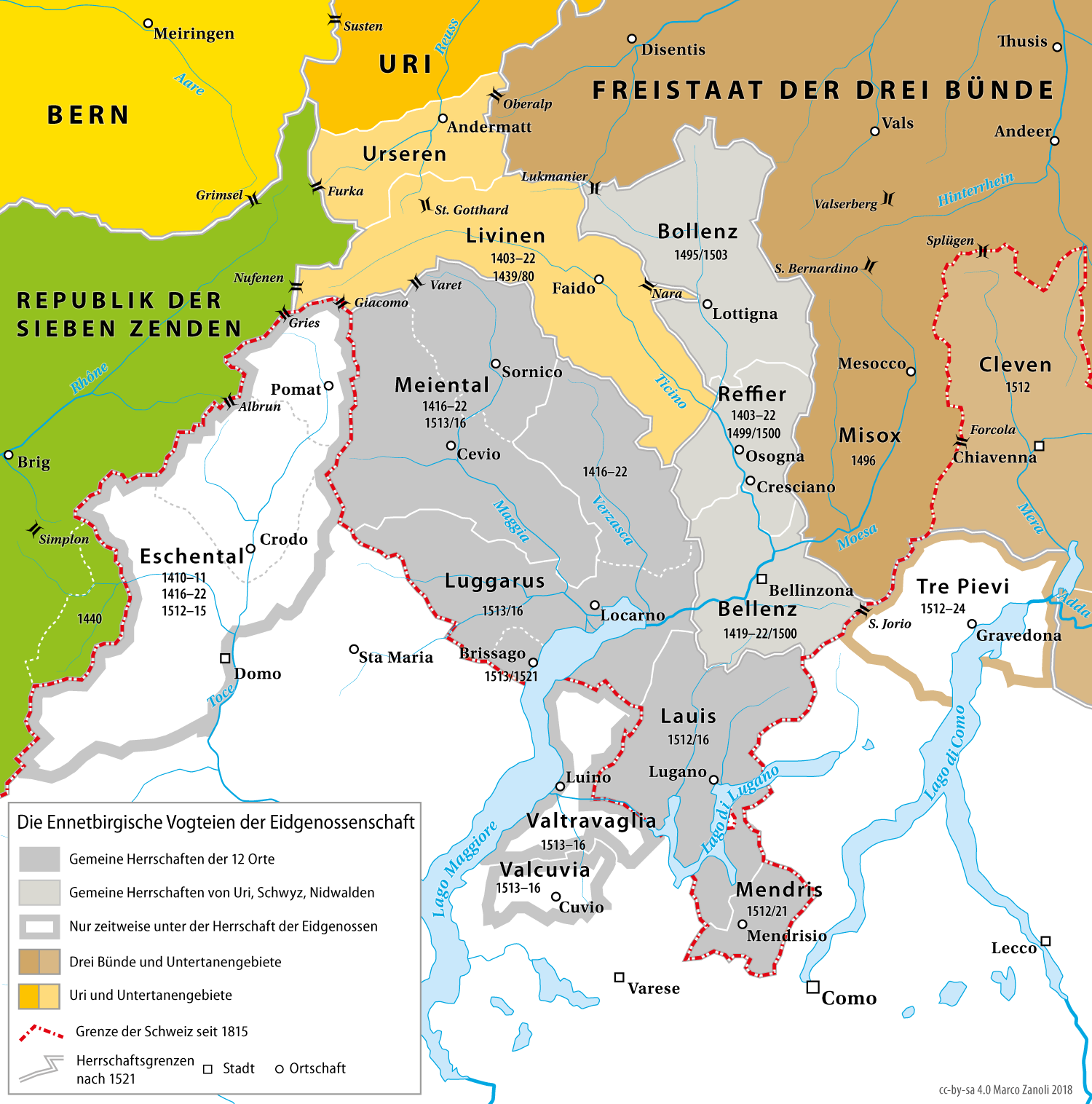
Transalpine territories of the Swiss Confederacy, 1403–1798

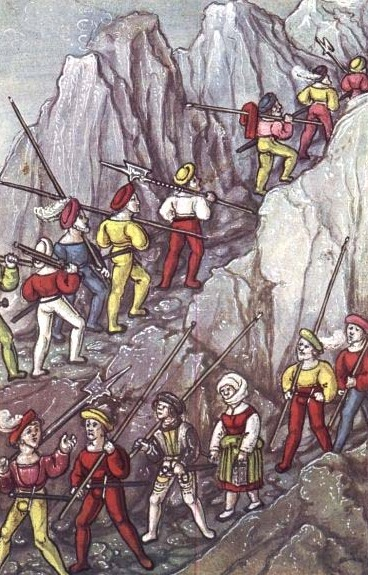
Swiss mercenaries cross the Alps in 1512 after quitting the Battle of Pavia (Luzerner Schilling, 1513)

The transalpine campaigns of the Old Swiss Confederacy (German: Ennetbirgische Feldzüge, "transmontane campaigns", as they are known in Swiss historiography) were military expeditions south of the Alps on the part of the Old Swiss Confederacy in the 15th and 16th centuries. Territories corresponding more or less to the modern canton of Ticino were conquered in these campaigns. The Swiss temporarily occupied also other territories in the Val d'Ossola and in modern Lombardy but these were lost during the campaigns. These territories were known as ennetbirgische Vogteien or "transmontane bailiwicks".

== History of the campaigns ==
The Leventina was the first transalpine possession of the Swiss cantons of Uri and Obwalden, acquired in 1403. Other territories were acquired in 1418 and 1419. A first setback came with the Battle of Arbedo in 1422, where the Swiss were defeated by the Duchy of Milan, and in a treaty of 1426, the border of the duchy was moved back to the Gotthard Pass. Renewed campaigns took place in 1439, 1441 and 1447, until in 1449 the Swiss were beaten again by troops of the Golden Ambrosian Republic in the Battle of Castione.

In 1466, the duke of Milan promised to grant the Leventina to the confederates, but he was slow to act on his promise, and as the Swiss were tied up in the Burgundian Wars he even formed a pact with the Burgundians. This prompted Uri to send an expedition to the Leventina, which was greeted as liberators by the local population. The Swiss tried to conquer Bellinzona as well, but after a two weeks' siege gave up and returned home. The Battle of Giornico was for once a Swiss victory, in which a force of Uri of about 175 men, with the support of about 400 men from the local population, ambushed from above and defeated a larger force of the Duchy of Milan, confined in a narrow icy valley, by rolling large boulders down the hillside against the Milanese. From this time, the Leventina was an undisputed possession of Uri, while Bellinzona remained under Milanese control.

In 1487, the Valais together with Lucerne wanted to expand into the Ossola. Besieging Domodossola and marauding the valleys, the Swiss were decisively defeated by the Duchy of Milan army at the Battle of Crevola in April 1487.

This was the situation at the beginning of the Italian Wars in 1494. Bellinzona was finally occupied by Uri in 1500, and officially granted to the confederacy by Louis XII of France in 1503. The Battle of Novara (1513) was a success for the Swiss Confederacy and the allied Three Leagues which secured their possessions of Locarno, Lugano, Mendrisio, Cuvio, Travaglia, Chiavenna, Bormio, Tre pievi and Valtellina. The defeat in the Battle of Marignano (1515) set an end to Swiss aspirations to further extend their possessions, but the peace of 1516 allowed them to keep their possessions, except for Ossola which was handed back to Milan.

These ennetbirgische Vogteien were governed partly by the entire confederacy, partly just by Uri, Schwyz and Nidwalden (and the Leventina just by Uri) throughout the early modern period. The Valtellina, governed by the Three Leagues from 1512, was lost to Spain in the course of the Bündner Wirren, in 1639.

== Transalpine bailiwicks ==
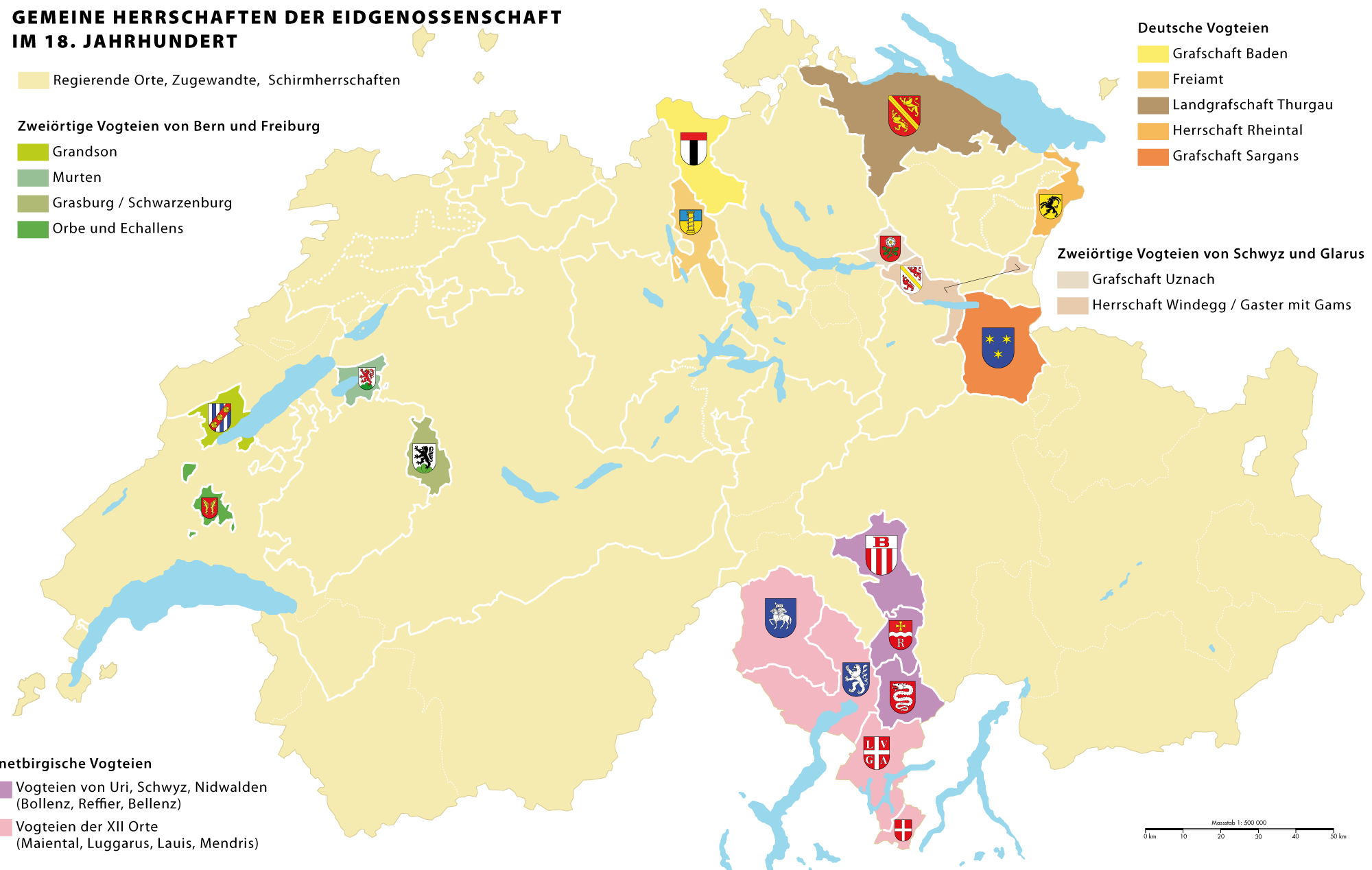
Swiss condominiums (Gemeine Herrschaften in the 18th century (the Leventina is shown as integral part of Uri).

Overview of the transalpine bailiwicks (German: Ennetbergische Vogteien, Italian: Baliaggi Ultramontani):

Condominiums of the Forest cantons of Uri, Schwyz and Nidwalden:

- Blenio — 1477–80 and from 1495
- Riviera — 1403–22 and from 1495
- Bellinzona — from 1500

Condominiums of the Twelve Cantons (Zwölf Orte, the Thirteen Cantons, minus Appenzell) from 1512:

- Valmaggia (Meinthal)
- Lugano (Lowerz)
- Locarno (Locaris)
- Mendrisio (Mendris)

Condominiums of the Twelve Cantons from 1512, but were lost from the Confederacy three years later and are now comuni of Lombardy and Piedmont:

- Travaglia
- Cuvio
- Ossola (Eschental)

== See also ==
- Battles of the Old Swiss Confederacy
- Italian Wars
- Battle of Marignano
- Musso war
