= Castles of Bellinzona =

UNESCO World Heritage Site
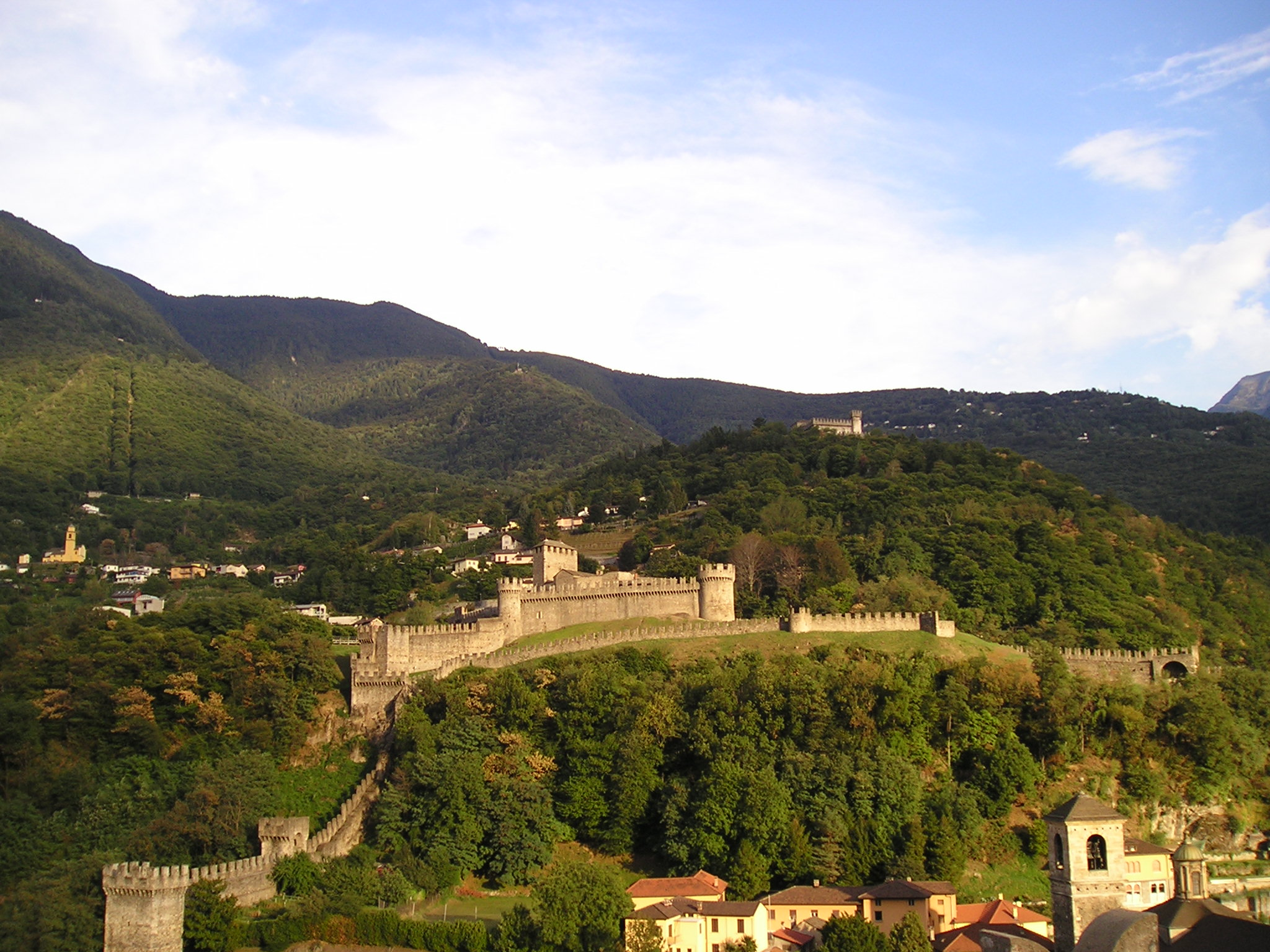
- Montebello and Sasso Corbaro castles above Bellinzona

- Location within Canton of Ticino Location within Switzerland
- Location: Bellinzona, Bellinzona District, Canton of Ticino, Switzerland
- Part of: Three Castles, Defensive Wall and Ramparts of the Market-Town of Bellinzona
- Includes: 1. Castelgrande; 2. Montebello; 3. Sasso Corbaro
- Criteria: Cultural: (iv)
- Reference: 884
- Inscription: 2000 (24th Session)
- Coordinates: 46°11′35.3″N 9°1′20.7″E

The Castles of Bellinzona are a group of fortifications located around the town of Bellinzona, the capital of the Swiss canton of Ticino. Situated on the Alpine foothills, the group is composed of fortified walls and three castles named Castelgrande, Montebello and Sasso Corbaro. Castelgrande is located on a rocky peak overlooking the valley, with a series of walls that protect the old city and connect to Montebello. Sasso Corbaro, the highest of the three castles, is located on an isolated rocky promontory south-east of the other two. The Castles of Bellinzona with their defensive walls have been an UNESCO World Heritage Site since 2000.

== History ==
=== Pre-History and Roman era ===
Bellinzona has always occupied an important geographic location in the Swiss Alps. It is situated a few kilometres south of Arbedo, where the Ticino and Moesa meet. Several key Alpine pass routes, connecting northern to southern Europe, including the Nufenen, St. Gotthard, Lukmanier and San Bernardino, all converge in the area around Bellinzona making it a key trading center.

While the region has been occupied since the early Neolithic age it was not until the late 1st century BC that a fort was built on the massive gneiss outcropping known as Castelgrande during the reign of the Roman Emperor Augustus. While the fort fell into disrepair in the following centuries, it was rebuilt and greatly expanded in the 4th century AD. During the reign of Diocletian and Constantine a chain of castles and watchtowers was built to protect northern Italy from invasion. Bellinzona's location was recognized as a key point in the defenses and a large castle was built on the Castelgrande. This castle, which was capable of holding a cohort — several hundred men — was tested in 475 when a formation of 900 Alemannic soldiers was defeated by the smaller castle garrison.

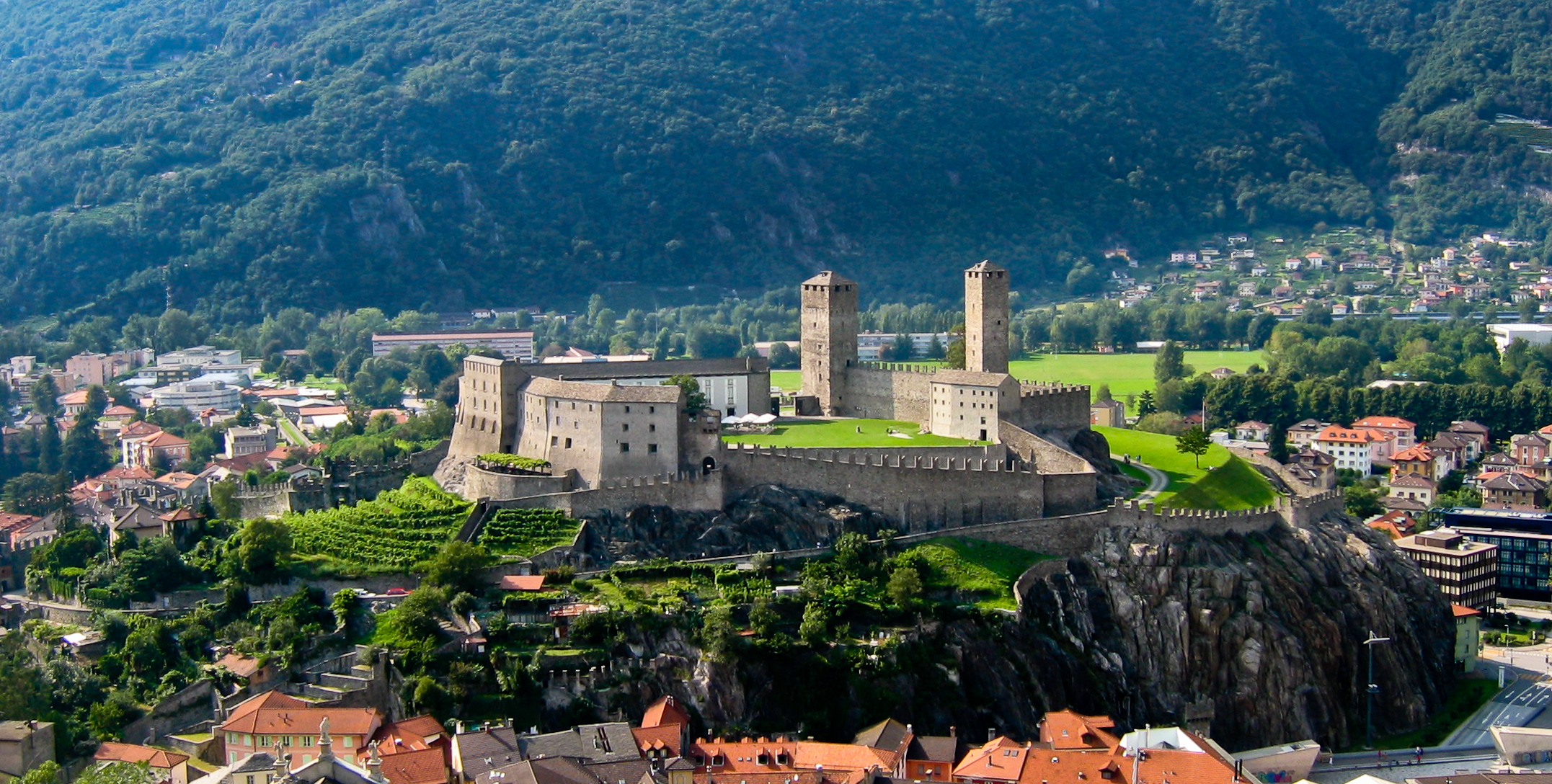
Castelgrande from Montebello. The commanding location of the castle rock in the narrow valley made this a natural site for fortifications

Following the collapse of the Western Roman Empire the successor states, which included the Ostrogoths around AD 500, the eastern Byzantine Empire towards the middle of the 6th century, and the Longobards from 568/70, all took control of Bellinzona and used the Castelgrande castle to assert control of the surrounding passes. Under the Longobards, Bellinzona became the site of a permanent garrison to protect the region from raids by the neighboring Frankish and Alemannic tribes. The historian, Gregory of Tours records that a Frankish invasion in 590 ended when it encountered heavy resistance from the Longobard defenders of the castle. According to legend, a spear thrust from a defender killed the attacking commander and ended the invasion. From Bellinzona the Longobards controlled the traffic on the important trade route from Varese over Ponte Tresa, the Monte Ceneri Pass, Biasca and finally over the Lukmanier Pass into Chur. Some researchers believe that Bellinzona may have been the capital of a county that included most of the valleys in Ticino.

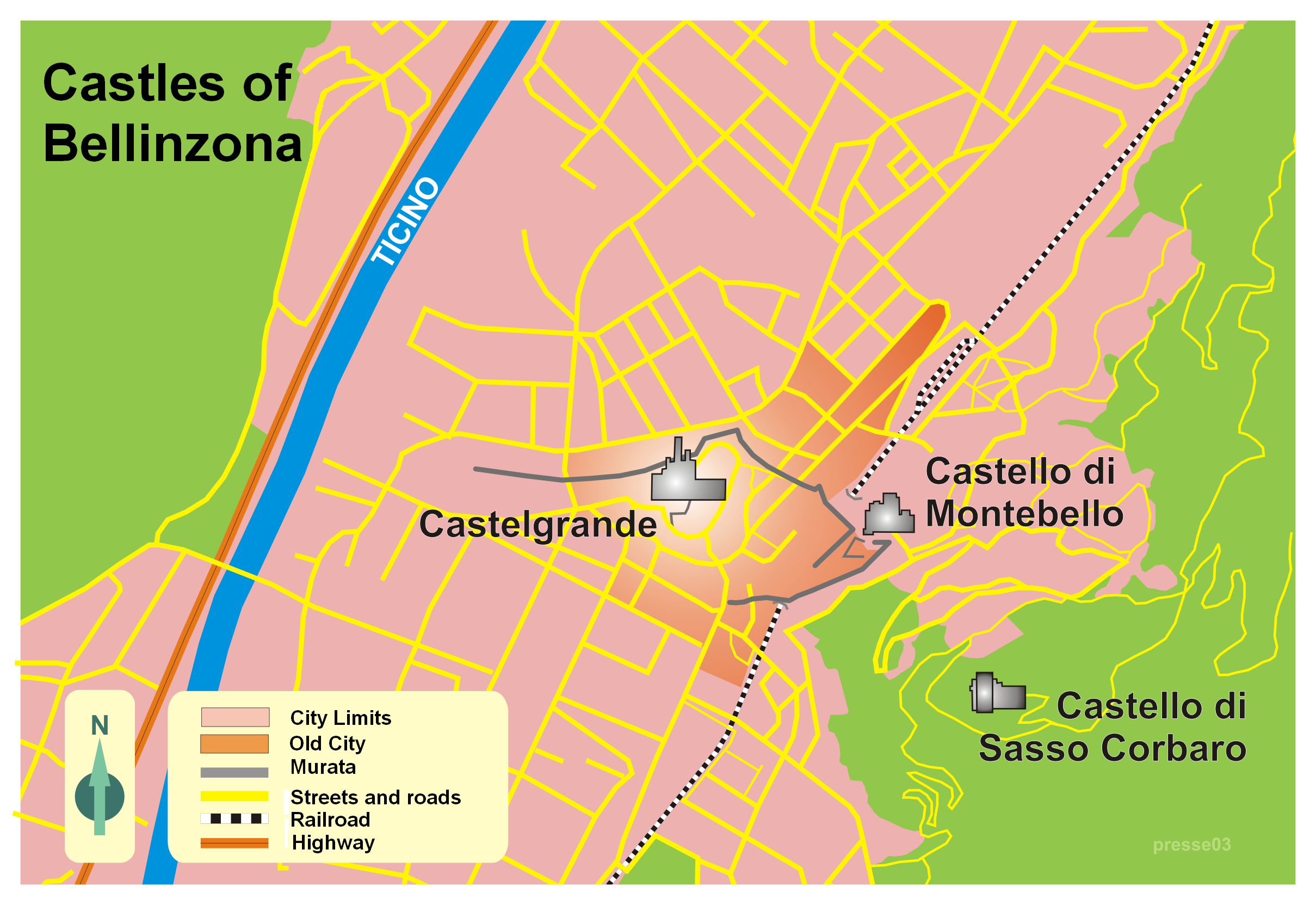
Location of the three castles in Bellinzona

At around 774 the Frankish Kingdom (that would become the Carolingian Empire) gained control of the Ticino valley including Bellinzona. Castelgrande was expanded with a chapel, apartments, towers and barracks. Older buildings and walls were rebuilt and strengthened. However, the southern part of the castle was destroyed by what appears to be an accidental fire in about 800AD.

=== Early Middle Ages ===
About two centuries later the Holy Roman Emperor Otto III, seeking to restore the power of glory of ancient Rome and expand into Italy, opened the Lukmanier and St. Bernard passes. Control of Bellinzona was a key part of this expansion. The city was taken from Milan and given as a gift to the Bishop of Como, who supported the Ottonian dynasty. In 1002, following the death of Otto III, Marquis Arduino of Ivrea declared himself King of Italy and ratified the bishop's ownership of Castelgrande. Two years later, after Arduino had been defeated by Henry II the King of Germany, Henry II's man Enrico II re-ratified the gift of the Castlegrande on the Bishop of Como. The bishop only owned the inner keep, which became known as the Bishop's Palace. However many of the nobles in the bishop's court commissioned towers and buildings within the grounds of the castle.

=== Conflicts between the Pope and the Emperor ===
Coat of arms of the House of Visconti (1395)

Under the Visconti, Bellinzona flourished and the Castelgrande was expanded.

During the Investiture controversy of the late 11th century the city of Bellinzona with its castle came under the control of the Hohenstaufens of Swabia. However, in 1180, Frederick I (Barbarossa) placed the city under the jurisdiction of the city of Como. In the following years Como tended to support the Pope in his conflicts with the Holy Roman Emperor. However, in 1239, Como sided with the Emperor Frederick II who quickly moved forces into Bellinzona and strengthened Castelgrande. In 1242 Milan sent Guelph (or pro-papacy) forces under the command of Simone di Orello to take Bellinzona. The city and castle were taken which weakened the Emperor south of the Alps. However the town was back under the jurisdiction of Como in 1249. Conflicts in northern Italy continued, Castelgrande was besieged several times in 1284, 1292 and 1303. During this time the Rusca family in Como, a Ghibelline or pro-Imperial family, fought the growing power of Milan under the pro-papacy House of Visconti with limited success. Around the end of the 13th century the Rusca family built another castle, Montebello, in Bellinzona, which they controlled. This was fortunate because by 1335 the Rusca family had been driven out of Como and had to retreat to Bellinzona. Five years later, in 1340, Milan besieged Bellinzona. Following a lengthy siege, the city fell to Milan but the Ruscas were allowed to keep Montebello. Pro-papacy Milan would dominate Bellinzona for the next one and a half centuries, though the pro-Imperial Rusca would also occupy part of the city.

=== Expansion of Bellinzona under Milan ===
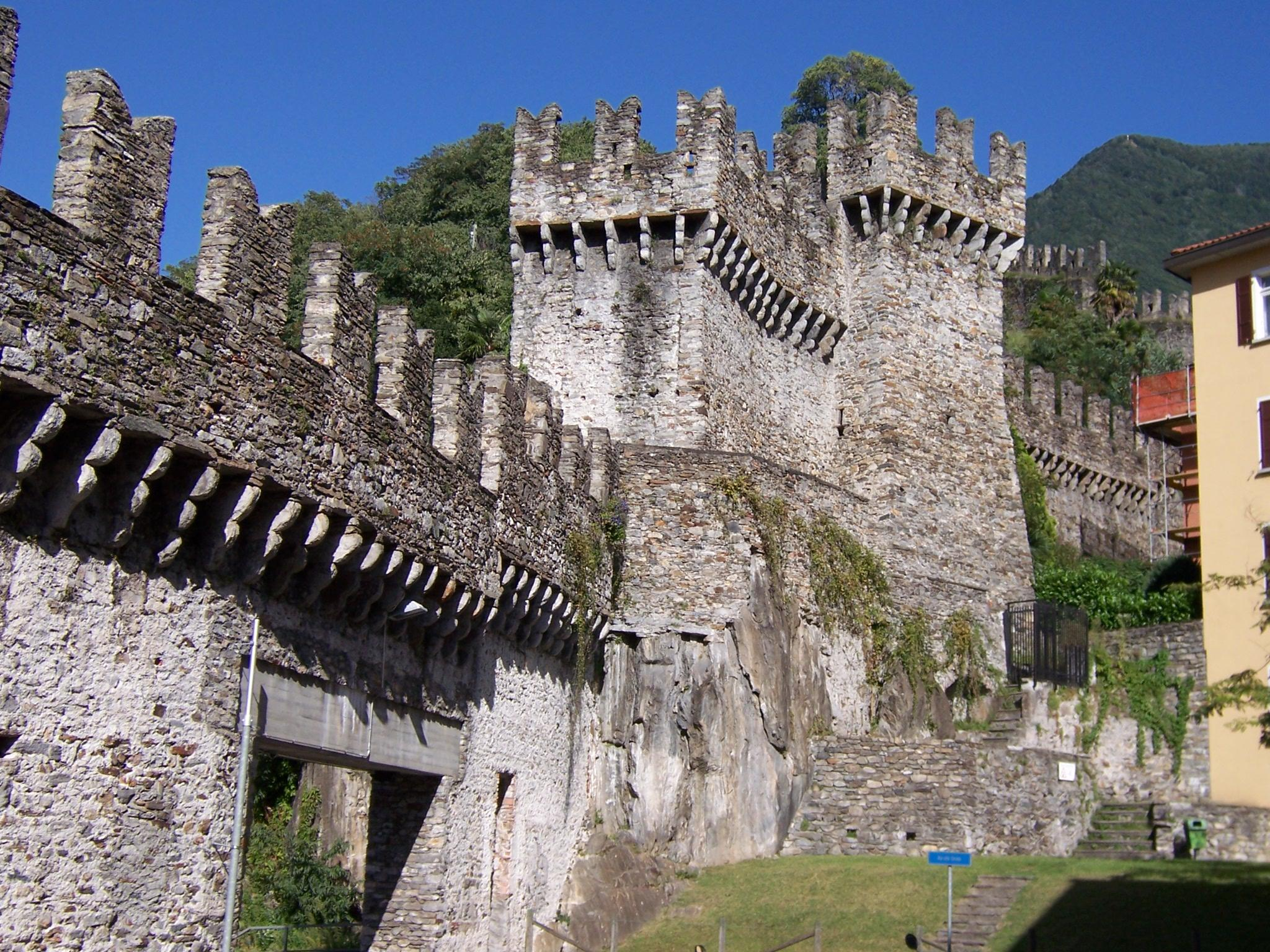
The Murata or city wall of Bellinzona

Under the control of the Visconti trade flourished and the city of Bellinzona grew. After the Schöllenen bridge opened, traffic in the St. Gotthard increased to the highest levels ever. During the second half of the 14th century a long wall, known as the Murata, was built across the entire valley of the Ticino, of which the bottom is about one kilometre wide at Bellinzona. This wall allowed Milan to protect and tax the trade route over the St. Gotthard Pass. While the city was controlled by Milan through the Visconti after 1340, the Visconti did not have a formal title and feudal rights until 1396 when they were granted by King Wenceslaus. However, the orderly growth of Bellinzona was threatened in 1402 when Duke Gian Galeazzo Visconti died. In 1403 Bellinzona was taken under the control of Alberto di Sacco of Val Mesolcina. He held Bellinzona until 1419 when it was taken over by Uri and Obwalden which had expanded into the Leventina Valley. Milan attacked the city three years later in 1422 after an offer to buy the city was rejected by the Swiss Confederation. The troops from Uri and Obwalden were quickly driven from the city and later defeated at the Battle of Arbedo on June 30, 1422. This defeat discouraged the expansionist intentions of Uri and its allies towards Lake Maggiore for a time.

During the period of unrest following Gian Galeazzo Visconti's death, a tower which would become the nucleus of the third castle, Sasso Corbaro, was built outside the city.

While the border between Uri and Milan was fixed in the peace treaty of 1426, in 1439 Uri invaded again. While they were unable to take Bellinzona, the victories of the Swiss troops led to Milan granting all of the Leventina Valley to Pollegio to Uri in 1441. Following the death of Duke Filippo Maria Visconti in 1447, Bellinzona was in the middle of the succession crisis between Franchino Rusca of Locarno and Heinrich of Val Mesolcina, who were allied with Uri and the Ambrosian Republic in Milan. The war following the succession crisis lasted nearly three years until Francesco I Sforza seized power in Milan. Bellinzona quickly accepted the new Sforza dynasty and the peace and stability that followed.

The peace was broken again in 1478 when the Swiss once again attacked Bellinzona unsuccessfully. However Swiss pride was restored by the Battle of Giornico which followed, where a force of 600 Swiss soldiers defeated 10,000 Milanese troops. Following the attack, Milan built Sasso Corbaro either on the site of a tower which had been built nearly a century before. The other two castles were strengthened and the Murata wall across the valley was rebuilt. Much of the modern castles and fortifications date from this period of construction in the late 15th century.

=== An associate of the Swiss Confederation ===
In 1499 nearly one and a half centuries of Milanese rule ended with the invasion of Milan by Louis XII of France. He captured Bellinzona and fearing an attack by the Swiss, fortified Castelgrande with 1000 troops. Throughout the winter of 1499/1500 unrest in Bellinzona grew, until January when an armed revolt of the citizens of Bellinzona drove the French troops from the city. Following the capture of Ludovico Sforza in April 1500 and seeking protection from France, Bellinzona joined the Swiss Confederation on April 14, 1500. Bellinzona would remain under the joint administration of Uri, Schwyz and Unterwalden until the creation of the Helvetic Republic after the French invasion of Switzerland in 1798. Now that Bellinzona's castles were no longer needed to defend against the Swiss, the walls were allowed to fall into disrepair. When flooding in 1515 destroyed part of the Murata the damage was not repaired. Each canton occupied one of the three castles with a small garrison of troops and outdated artillery.

=== Since 1803 ===
Following the Act of Mediation in 1803 Bellinzona became part of the independent canton of Ticino, and the castles became the property of the state. Montebello, Sasso Corbaro and the city walls were neglected and were in a serious state of disrepair by 1900. Castelgrande was used as an arsenal and as a prison for the canton. In 1850 the new Federal Government, concerned over instability in neighboring countries, built a number of defensive fortification along the St. Gotthard pass. The project provided work for many unemployed citizens of Ticino. In Bellinzona the construction included strengthening the wall and building barracks, which were designed to resemble the medieval fortifications of Bellinzona. This fortification eventually became part of the Castelgrande complex. In 1881, the government tried to sell Castelgrande but weren't able to find any buyers.

The first attempts to repair the fortifications started around 1900. In 1953, in celebration of 150 years since the founding of the canton, a major repair project started on the castles. However, the largest reconstruction lasted about a decade and finished in 1992. This project, under the Ticino architect Aurelio Galfetti, repurposed many of the buildings as well as restoring them. For example, the castle grounds became a park and the central halls became museum rooms.

Montebello, which had been privately owned by the Ghiringhelli family, was given to the canton and restored between 1902 and 1910. The castle is now home to the Museo Civico which has a large collection of archeological artifacts. In 1871 Sasso Corbaro was bought by a group and converted into a hotel and later a restaurant was added. In 1919 the canton placed the castle under protection to prevent further modification of the castle. It was restored between 1930 and 1935 and in 1964–97 was home to the Museo delle arti e delle tradizioni popolari ticinesi.

== Castelgrande ==
=== Castle site ===
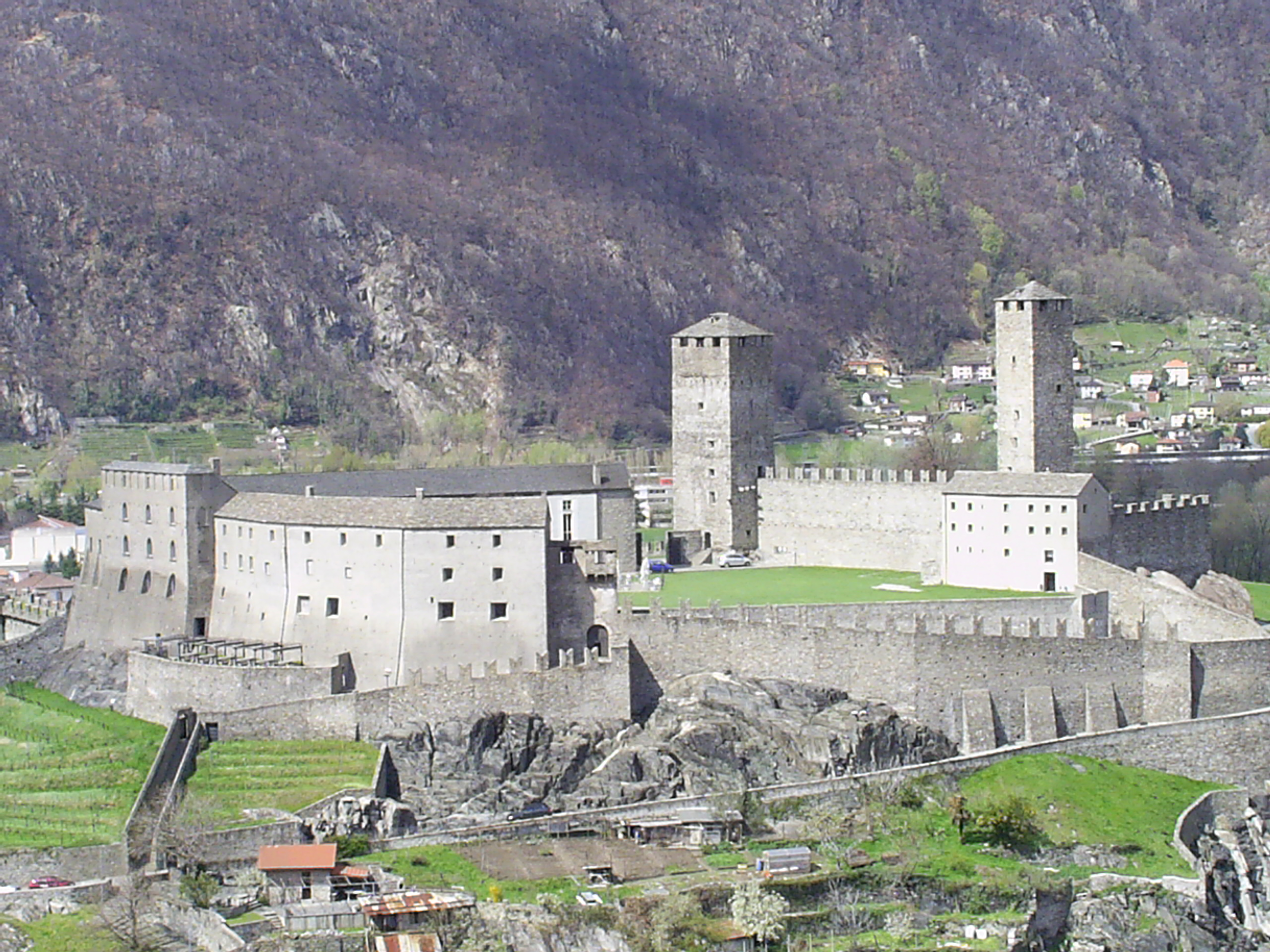
Castelgrande showing the walls and towers of the extensive castle

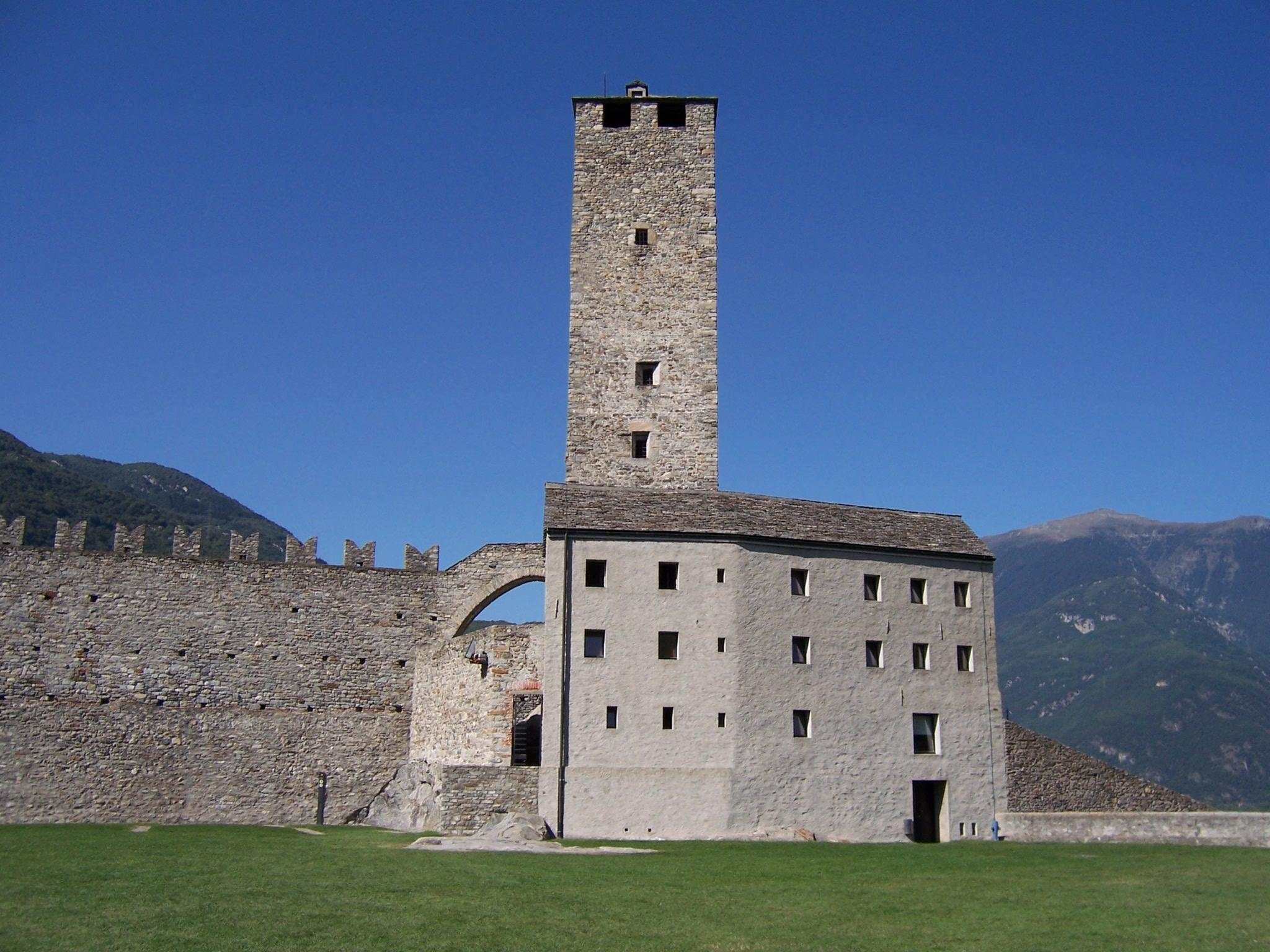
The Torre Bianca or white tower of Castelgrande

46°11′34.40″N 9°01′20.40″E
The site of Castelgrande has been fortified since at least the late 1st century BC and until the 13th century, it was the only fortification in Bellinzona. During its history, the castle has been known as "the stronghold" (before the 13th century), the Old Castle (14–15th centuries), Uri Castle after 1506, and Saint Michael's Castle from 1818.

The Castelgrande hill includes a near-vertical side on the north, a steep southern side, and is nearly flat and 150–200 meters (490–660 ft) in diameter. The natural shape of the hill has encouraged every manmade fortification to follow the same contours. While the Roman fort is not visible, the Roman foundations were followed in building the castle during the High Middle Ages. Of that period's structure, the only remaining visible parts are bits of standing wall. Much of the visible castle dates from 1250 to 1500, with extensive renovations and some expansion in the last two centuries. Most of the area inside the castle walls is now flat, open space.

Records from the 11th to 15th centuries as well as archeological evidence indicate that the castle grounds were once full of buildings. However most of these were pulled down by the Dukes of Milan to free up interior space. The open space was divided into three large baileys which served to provide temporary housing for troops that could be stationed in Bellinzona. Under the Dukes of Milan, the outer fortifications were extended and strengthened. The walls were raised and extended, while towers were added. The western walls were wholly rebuilt and connected to the city walls.

The walls that separate the three baileys all radiate from the 14th century Terre Nera, which is located in the center of the castle. To the east is a complex of buildings which were part of the old keep. In the center of the keep is the tallest tower of Castelgrande, the Torre Bianca ("White Tower"), which dates to the 13th century. Surrounding the Torre Bianca is the palace of the Bishop of Como (mentioned in the 12th century), which may contain masonry from an earlier 10th or 11th century structure. The nearby South Wing, which marks the southern boundary of the castle, was built in two stages during the 13th and 15th centuries on the foundations of an earlier building. To the west of the South Wing is a building that served as an arsenal in the 19th century, and was fully renovated in the 20th century. Archaeological research has revealed there were two chapels located in this bailey, though only the foundations have been discovered. In the western bailey can still be seen the ruins of a church, possibly dedicated to the Madonna. The rest of the buildings once occupying this bailey have all been destroyed. In the north bailey, there were certainly buildings, though these have also been destroyed. The sheer cliff face was not fortified with a wall until the 14th or 15th century.

=== Sights ===
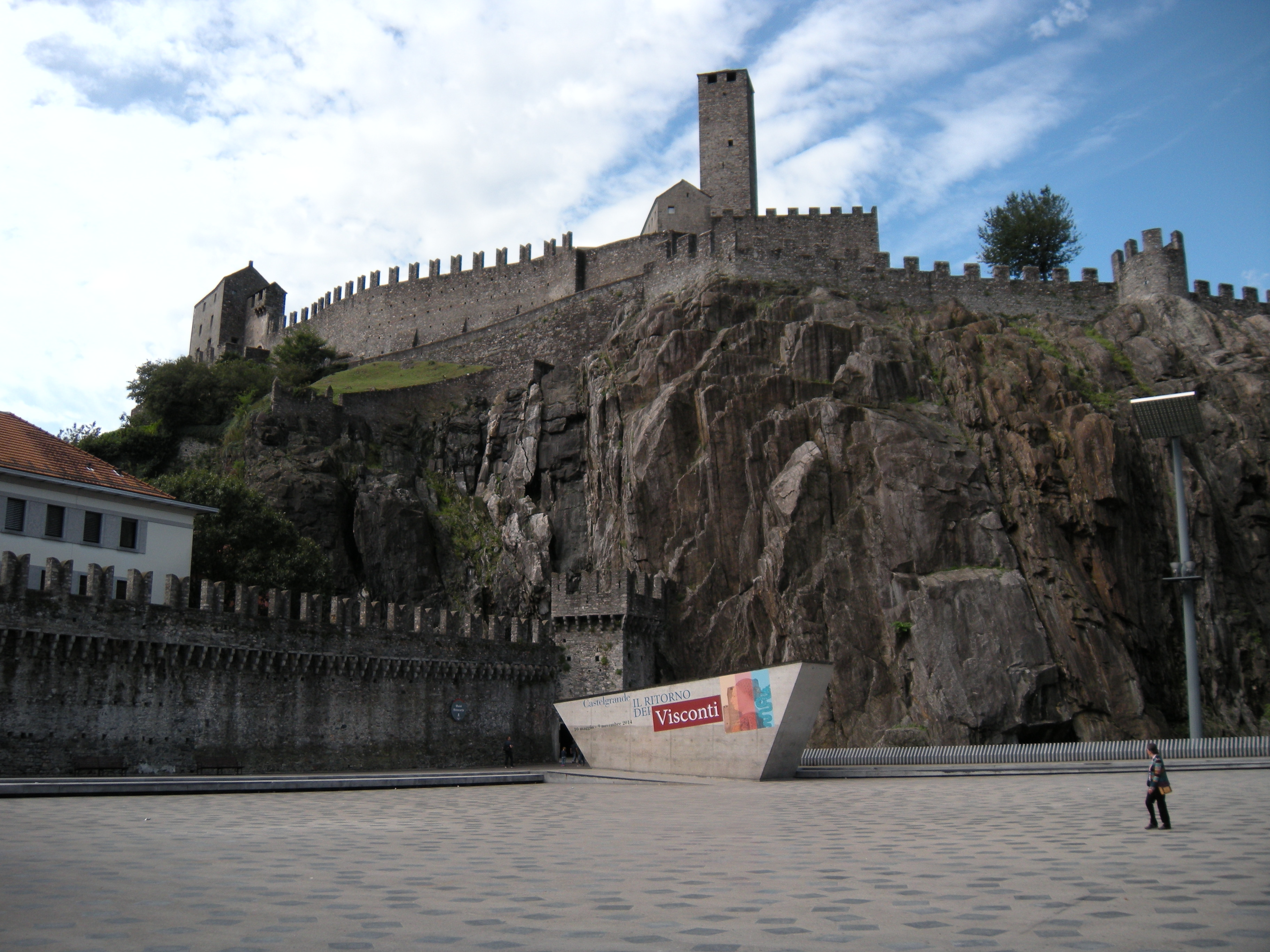
View of Castelgrande from Piazza del Sole

The castle can be reached by taking an elevator from the foot of the rock to the castle grounds or by climbing steep, narrow streets from the city center through the city wall onto the castle grounds. The south wing houses a museum that contains "6500 years of human presence on the hill ... and covers the period from the first Neolithic village to the 20th century". The museum also includes the decorated ceilings of Casa Ghiringhelli and from a former inn, the Albergo della Cervia as well as a collection from Bellinzona's mint. The museum is open throughout the year. To the west of the museum is the 19th-century arsenal, which now houses a restaurant.

== Montebello ==
=== Castle site ===
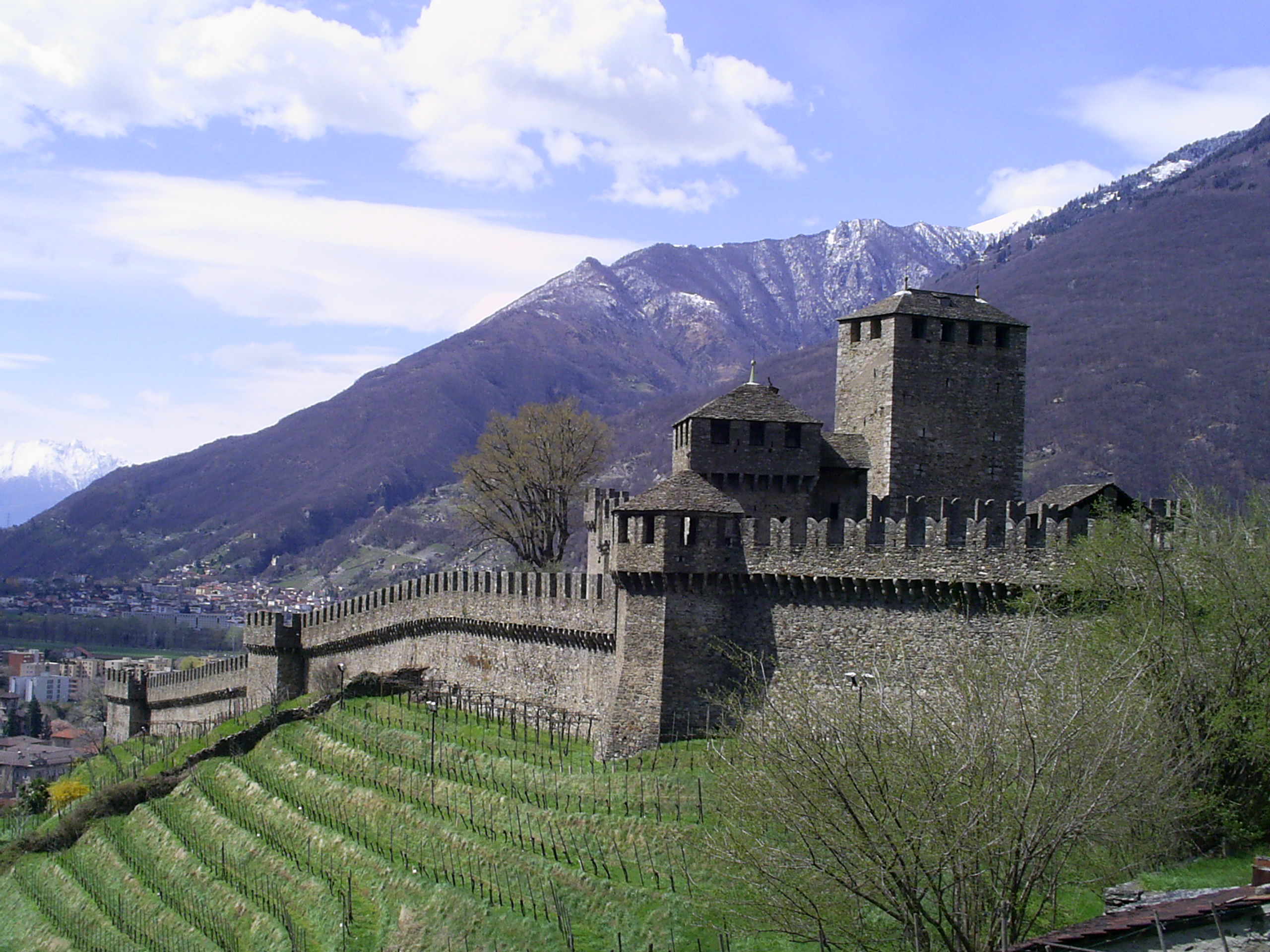
Montebello castle located on a rocky hilltop east of town is connected to Castelgrande by the city walls

46°11′28.80″N 9°01′35.80″E
Montebello Castle (known as the Small, New or Middle Castle in the 15th century, as Schwyz Castle from 1506 and St. Martin's Castle after 1818) is located to the east of the town center. It was built before 1313 for the pro-Imperial Rusca family, who occupied the castle following the Visconti victory and occupation of Castelgrande. By the end of the 14th century it was in the hands of the Visconti. The castle was renovated and expanded between 1462 and 1490 to its current state. In the 19th century the castle fell into disrepair and was renovated starting in 1903.

Unlike Castelgrande, Montebello was not protected by natural features. It is surrounded by deep moats that protected the walls. The complex is rhomboid in shape and connected to the city walls on the south and north. The castle clearly shows the three stages of construction, with the original central keep surrounded by the 14th-century walls which are in turn surrounded by the 15th-century walls.

The inner keep dates from before 1313 and is an irregular rectangle. It appears that the battlemented tower with a hip roof on the north-east side of the keep is an incorrect reconstruction from 1903. Prints from the 17th century show a four-story building with a roof sloped toward the interior of the keep. The keep was built with a high, strong outer wall with living quarters and utility buildings along the inner wall. The original entrance is located high on the western wall and can only be reached by climbing an external flight of stairs. The well in the inner eastern bailey may be from the original castle.

The 14th-century wall was partly included in the later 15th-century wall, but some original sections can still be seen. The 14th-century gateway is supported by a projecting gatehouse, though the inner and outer drawbridges are modern reproductions.

The 15th-century wall is located 715 m (2,346 ft) from the original complex, with a moat on the east side and a rounded arch in the south-east side. It includes some parts of the 14th-century wall. An arrowhead-shaped barbican was added to the east of the moat and was protected by another moat and machicolated battlements on the north side. On the south side a gate, equipped with murder-hole, was added during this expansion.

A little chapel, dedicated to Saint Michael, leans against the wall of the more recent south-facing section; built around 1600, it is one of the few buildings erected in the castles of Bellinzona under the rule of the three Swiss cantons.

=== Sights ===
In addition to the castle walls Montebello Castle houses the Archaeological and Civic Museum. The museum was opened in 1974 and is located in the tower and the former residential quarters of Montebello Castle. It is divided into two sections-history and archaeology. In the history section there are several capitals from the 15th century and a rare 13th century Baptismal font as well as drawings and sketchs from several artists. This section also houses a collection of ceremonial and military arms. The archaeology section includes many items from 1400 to 1500 B.C. as well as ceramics, glassware, funeral urns, ornamental objects and jewellery in iron and bronze from around the canton. The museum is open from March to November.

=== Salami production ===
The cellars of Montebello Castle are used to mature regional salami. The arm-thick sausages spend about four weeks or longer in the medieval walls.

=== In popular culture ===
In the 1990s, some scenes of the idents of TSI's masked troubadour were filmed in the Montebello Castle.

== Sasso Corbaro ==
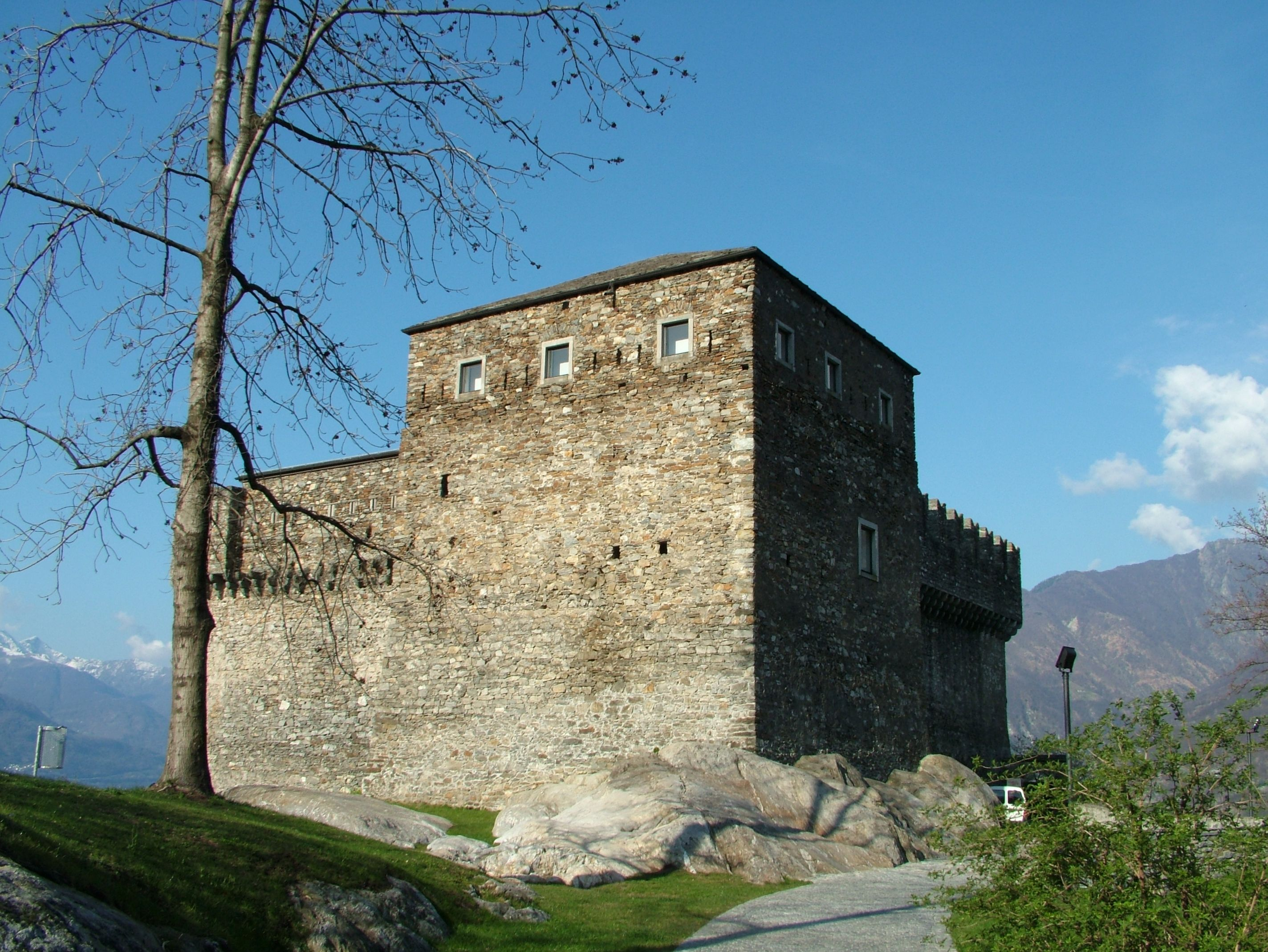
Sasso Corbaro castle

=== Castle site ===
46°11′17.46″N 9°01′48.56″E
Sasso Corbaro, known as Unterwalden Castle after 1506 and Saint Barbara's Castle after 1818, is about 600 m (2,000 ft) south-east of town on a rocky hill. Unlike the other two castles Sasso Corbaro is not integrated into the city walls. The first part of the castle was the north-eastern tower which was built in 1478 to close a gap in the defenses of the city. In 1479 a small garrison was moved to the tower. During peacetime the tower was used as a prison, though at least one prisoner escaped in 1494. The walls and south-west tower were added later. The castle was struck by lightning multiple times during the 16th and 17th centuries, and by 1900 was falling into ruins.

The fortress is a 25 by 25 m (82 by 82 ft) square with square towers on the north-east and south-west corners. The east wall is 1.8 m (5 ft 11 in) thick and other walls are about 1 m (3.3 ft) thick. All the walls have machicolations and swallowtail merlons for defense. The entrance to the courtyard is through the western wall, and contains evidence of a portcullis. The two-story buildings on the south and west walls were both living quarters with a gabled roof. The castle chapel is located on the eastern side of the courtyard.

The north-eastern keep currently has four stories, though no records exist of its original height and roof. It was used as a living area when the castle was occupied.

=== Sights ===
Today, Sasso Corbaro Castle houses the Sala Emma Poglia which is the "wooden room" built for the Emma family during the 17th century. Originally located in the entrance hall of their home in Olivone in the Blenio Valley, the room was purchased by the Canton of Ticino in 1944 and housed first in Castelgrande before being moved to the Sasso Corbaro in 1989. The room is panelled entirely in walnut and also includes the stüva, stove which provided heating. The stove bears the crest of the Emma family (an eagle and a lion rampant). The museum also houses temporary exhibits. It is open from March until November.
