= Battle of Giornico =

- Part of Transalpine campaigns
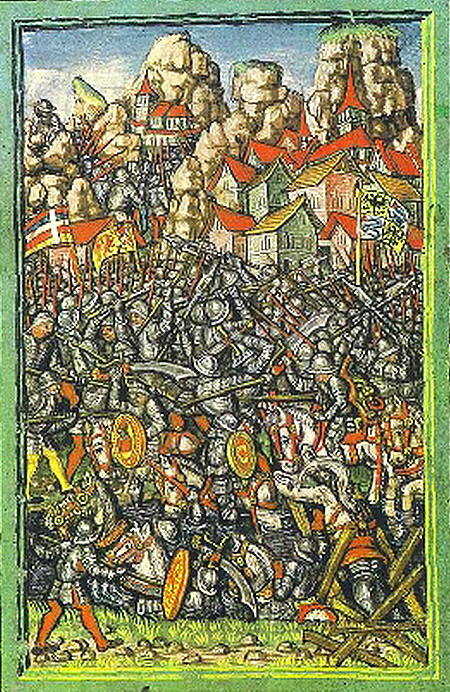
- Luzerner Schilling miniature
Date	28 December 1478
Location	Giornico 46.3833°N 8.88333°E
Result	Victory for the Old Swiss Confederacy

Belligerents
Duchy of Milan	Old Swiss Confederacy

Commanders and leaders
Unknown	Unknown

Strength
Thousands	c.600 (from Uri, the Leventina valley, Zurich, Schwyz and Lucerne)

Casualties and losses
1,400	Unknown (possibly 0)

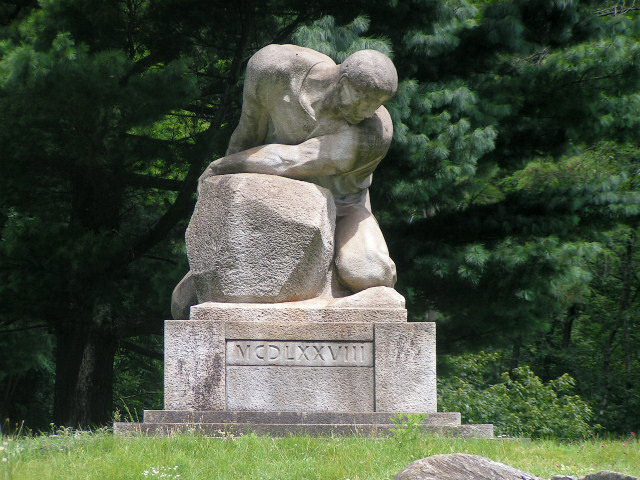
Memorial in Giornico

In the Battle of Giornico, also known as the battle of large rocks (Italian: Battaglia di Giornico, dei Sassi Grossi; German: Schlacht bei Giornico) (28 December 1478), about 600 Swiss troops ambushed from above and defeated a larger force of the Duchy of Milan, confined in a narrow icy valley, by rolling large boulders down the hillside against the Milanese.

== History ==
The Battle of Giornico was part of an expansionist policy of the Old Swiss Confederation during the 15th century. The confederation attempted to expand into the southern foothills of the Alps to gain control of both ends of the valuable mountain passes. In November 1478, troops of the Canton of Uri moved south over the Gotthard pass into the Leventina valley. The population of the valley, who had long been opposed to Milan, greeted the Swiss troops as liberators and allies. However, below the valley at Bellinzona, they found the city gates closed. Uri was quickly joined by forces from other Confederation cantons and established a siege camp below the walls of Bellinzona on 30 November 1478. The Duke of Milan responded by sending 10,000 men toward Bellinzona to drive the Confederates back and reassert his control over the Leventina.

== The battle ==
On 16 December the Milanese army reached Magadino on Lake Maggiore about 14 km (8.7 mi) from Bellinzona. However, the Confederates had already retired, after a 14-day siege of Bellinzona, to the Gotthard Pass. Only a 175-strong reserve army, reinforced by about 400 soldiers from the Leventina, were guarding the rear at Giornico in the Leventina valley. The entire Milanese army reached Giornico on 28 December 1478 and outnumbered the defenders by about twenty-to-one. The defenders were able to defeat the much larger force because the Milanese army was confined in a narrow valley, struggling for foothold on the December snow and ice. The Swiss ambushed the army from above, creating confusion by rolling large boulders down the hillside. They reportedly also wore crampons for better foothold. Against this attack, the Milanese army was helpless regardless of its superior number, and they were forced to flee, leaving an estimated 1,400 casualties.

== Aftermath ==
Following this decisive defeat, the Duke of Milan withdrew from the Leventina, leaving it under Uri's control. The treaty of Lucerne was signed on 3 March 1480 establishing the cession of Leventina from Milan to Uri.

To consolidate his power in Bellinzona, the Duke of Milan built the small Sasso Corbaro castle. Nine years later, the Swiss and the Milanese met again, in 1487, at the Battle of Crevola.

== See also ==
- Battles of the Old Swiss Confederacy
