= Personico =

- Municipality
- Flag Coat of arms
- Location of Personico
- Location within Switzerland Location within Canton of Ticino
- Coordinates: 46°22′N 8°55′E
- Country: Switzerland
- Canton: Ticino
- District: Leventina

Government
  - Mayor: Sindaco

Area
  - Total: 39.04 km^{2} (15.07 sq mi)
- Elevation: 325 m (1,066 ft)

Population (December 2004)
  - Total: 361
  - Density: 9.25/km^{2} (23.9/sq mi)
- Time zone: UTC+01:00 (CET)
  - Summer (DST): UTC+02:00 (CEST)
- Postal code: 6744
- SFOS number: 5076
- ISO 3166 code: CH-TI
- Surrounded by: Biasca, Bodio, Frasco, Gerra (Verzasca), Giornico, Iragna, Lavertezzo, Pollegio
- Website: https://www.personico.ch SFSO statistics

Personico is a municipality in the district of Leventina in the canton of Ticino in Switzerland.

== History ==
Personico is first mentioned in 1227 as Prexonego. During the Middle Ages, it belonged to the Vicinanza of Giornico. The village church of SS. Nazario e Celso was first mentioned in 1256. It belonged to the parish of Biasca until 1570, when it became an independent parish church. The church was restored in 1926 and again in 1978–79. Between 1736 and 1869 there was in a glass factory in operation in the village. A subsidiary factory was built in 1782 in Lodrino. The local economy mostly relied on livestock until the 19th century, when they began mining local stone. Between 1962 and 1967, the hydroelectric plant of Nuova Biaschina and dam in the Val d'Ambra was built. In 1999, another, smaller power plant was completed. In 2005, about 12% of the jobs were in the agricultural sector while about 46% were in industry and manufacturing.

== Geography ==
Personico has an area, as of 1997, of 39.04 square kilometers (15.07 sq mi). Of this area, 0.55 km^{2} (0.21 sq mi) or 1.4% is used for agricultural purposes, while 24.88 km^{2} (9.61 sq mi) or 63.7% is forested. Of the rest of the land, 0.61 km^{2} (0.24 sq mi) or 1.6% is settled (buildings or roads), 0.77 km^{2} (0.30 sq mi) or 2.0% is either rivers or lakes and 11.27 km^{2} (4.35 sq mi) or 28.9% is unproductive land.

Of the built up area, housing and buildings made up 0.5% and transportation infrastructure made up 0.4%. Out of the forested land, 48.8% of the total land area is heavily forested, while 12.9% is covered in small trees and shrubbery and 2.0% is covered with orchards or small clusters of trees. Of the agricultural land, 0.9% is used for growing crops. All the water in the municipality is flowing water. Of the unproductive areas, 15.2% is unproductive vegetation and 13.6% is too rocky for vegetation.

The municipality is located in the Leventina district, on the left side of the lower Leventina valley.

== Coat of arms ==
The blazon of the municipal coat of arms is Or a chamois' head couped Sable and in chief two mullets Gules.

== Demographics ==
Personico has a population (as of December 2020) of 326. As of 2008, 19.8% of the population are resident foreign nationals. Over the last 10 years (1997–2007) the population has changed at a rate of -2.4%.

Most of the population (as of 2000) speaks Italian (95.5%), with Serbo-Croatian being second most common ( 1.7%) and German being third ( 0.8%). Of the Swiss national languages (as of 2000), 3 speak German, 2 people speak French, 337 people speak Italian. The remainder (11 people) speak another language.

As of 2008, the gender distribution of the population was 49.5% male and 50.5% female. The population was made up of 144 Swiss men (39.3% of the population), and 37 (10.1%) non-Swiss men. There were 145 Swiss women (39.6%), and 40 (10.9%) non-Swiss women.

In 2008 there was 1 live birth to Swiss citizens and 2 non-Swiss citizen deaths. Ignoring immigration and emigration, the population of Swiss citizens increased by 1 while the foreign population decreased by 2. There was 1 Swiss man and 1 Swiss woman who emigrated from Switzerland. At the same time, there was 1 non-Swiss man who emigrated from Switzerland to another country and 2 non-Swiss women who immigrated from another country to Switzerland. The total Swiss population change in 2008 (from all sources) was a decrease of 7 and the non-Swiss population change was a decrease of 5 people. This represents a population growth rate of -3.2%.

The age distribution, as of 2009, in Personico is; 33 children or 9.0% of the population are between 0 and 9 years old and 41 teenagers or 11.2% are between 10 and 19. Of the adult population, 47 people or 12.8% of the population are between 20 and 29 years old. 39 people or 10.7% are between 30 and 39, 52 people or 14.2% are between 40 and 49, and 46 people or 12.6% are between 50 and 59. The senior population distribution is 48 people or 13.1% of the population are between 60 and 69 years old, 34 people or 9.3% are between 70 and 79, there are 26 people or 7.1% who are over 80.

As of 2000, there were 148 private households in the municipality, and an average of 2.3 persons per household. In 2000 there were 134 single family homes (or 79.3% of the total) out of a total of 169 inhabited buildings. There were 28 two family buildings (16.6%) and 5 multi-family buildings (3.0%). There were also 2 buildings in the municipality that were multipurpose buildings (used for both housing and commercial or another purpose).

The vacancy rate for the municipality, in 2008, was 0.87%. In 2000 there were 222 apartments in the municipality. The most common apartment size was the 4 room apartment of which there were 79. There were 21 single room apartments and 44 apartments with five or more rooms. Of these apartments, a total of 148 apartments (66.7% of the total) were permanently occupied, while 69 apartments (31.1%) were seasonally occupied and 5 apartments (2.3%) were empty. As of 2007, the construction rate of new housing units was 2.7 new units per 1000 residents.

The historical population is given in the following table:

year	population
1745	269
1850	306
1900	288
1950	270
1990	379
2000	353

== Heritage sites of national significance ==
The Centrale Elettrica Comandi Biaschina (the Biaschina power plant control station) is listed as a Swiss heritage site of national significance.

== Politics ==
In the 2007 federal election the most popular party was the FDP which received 36.72% of the vote. The next three most popular parties were the CVP (32.81%), the SP (18.53%) and the Ticino League (9.15%). In the federal election, a total of 115 votes were cast, and the voter turnout was 47.3%.

In the 2007 Gran Consiglio election, there were a total of 245 registered voters in Personico, of which 162 or 66.1% voted. 1 blank ballot was cast, leaving 161 valid ballots in the election. The most popular party was the PLRT which received 60 or 37.3% of the vote. The next three most popular parties were; the PPD+GenGiova (with 35 or 21.7%), the PS (with 29 or 18.0%) and the SSI (with 24 or 14.9%).

In the 2007 Consiglio di Stato election, 1 null ballot was cast, leaving 161 valid ballots in the election. The most popular party was the PLRT which received 61 or 37.9% of the vote. The next three most popular parties were; the PPD (with 35 or 21.7%), the PS (with 30 or 18.6%) and the SSI (with 20 or 12.4%).

== Economy ==
As of 2007, Personico had an unemployment rate of 3.98%. As of 2005, there were 11 people employed in the primary economic sector and about 5 businesses involved in this sector. 34 people were employed in the secondary sector and there were 5 businesses in this sector. 31 people were employed in the tertiary sector, with 13 businesses in this sector. There were 154 residents of the municipality who were employed in some capacity, of which females made up 33.8% of the workforce.

In 2000, there were 18 workers who commuted into the municipality and 121 workers who commuted away. The municipality is a net exporter of workers, with about 6.7 workers leaving the municipality for every one entering. Of the working population, 5.2% used public transportation to get to work, and 74% used a private car. As of 2009, there was one hotel in Personico.

== Religion ==
From the 2000 census, 306 or 86.7% were Roman Catholic, while 3 or 0.8% belonged to the Swiss Reformed Church. There are 35 individuals (or about 9.92% of the population) who belong to another church (not listed on the census), and 9 individuals (or about 2.55% of the population) did not answer the question.

== Education ==
In Personico about 63.2% of the population (between age 25 and 64) have completed either non-mandatory upper secondary education or additional higher education (either university or a Fachhochschule).

In Personico there were a total of 59 students (as of 2009). The Ticino education system provides up to three years of non-mandatory kindergarten and in Personico there were 10 children in kindergarten. The primary school program lasts for five years and includes both a standard school and a special school. In the municipality, 15 students attended the standard primary schools and 0 students attended the special school. In the lower secondary school system, students either attend a two-year middle school followed by a two-year pre-apprenticeship or they attend a four-year program to prepare for higher education. There were 21 students in the two-year middle school, none in their pre-apprenticeship, and 6 students were in the four-year advanced program.

The upper secondary school includes several options, but at the end of the upper secondary program, a student will be prepared to enter a trade or to continue on to a university or college. In Ticino, vocational students may either attend school while working on their internship or apprenticeship (which takes three or four years) or may attend school followed by an internship or apprenticeship (which takes one year as a full-time student or one and a half to two years as a part-time student). There were 3 vocational students who were attending school full-time and 4 who attend part-time.

As of 2000, there were 30 students from Personico who attended schools outside the municipality.
