= Travaglio =

Travaglio is an Italian surname. Notable people with the surname include:

- Guy Travaglio, (1926–2019), American politician and businessman
- Marco Travaglio (born 1964), Italian investigative journalist, writer, and commentator

== See also ==
- Travaglia
