= Luigi Imperatori =

Swiss theologian and pedagogist

- Born: 1844; Pollegio, Switzerland
- Died: 1900
- Occupation(s): Priest, Theologian, Pedagogist, Author

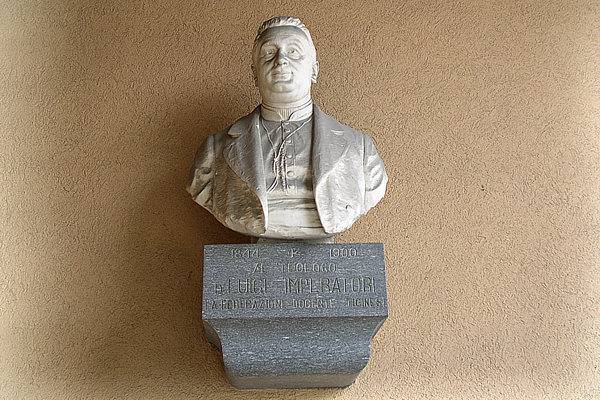
A bust of the famous Swiss theologian

Luigi Imperatori (1844–1900), one of the most famous pedagogists and theologians of Canton Ticino, born in Pollegio (Switzerland, Canton Ticino), teacher and doctor of theology, an important contributor to the Swiss catholic newspapers: "Catholic Believer" and "Freedom." First Director of the magistral school of Canton Ticino, from 1888 to 1900.
