= Giornico =

- Municipality
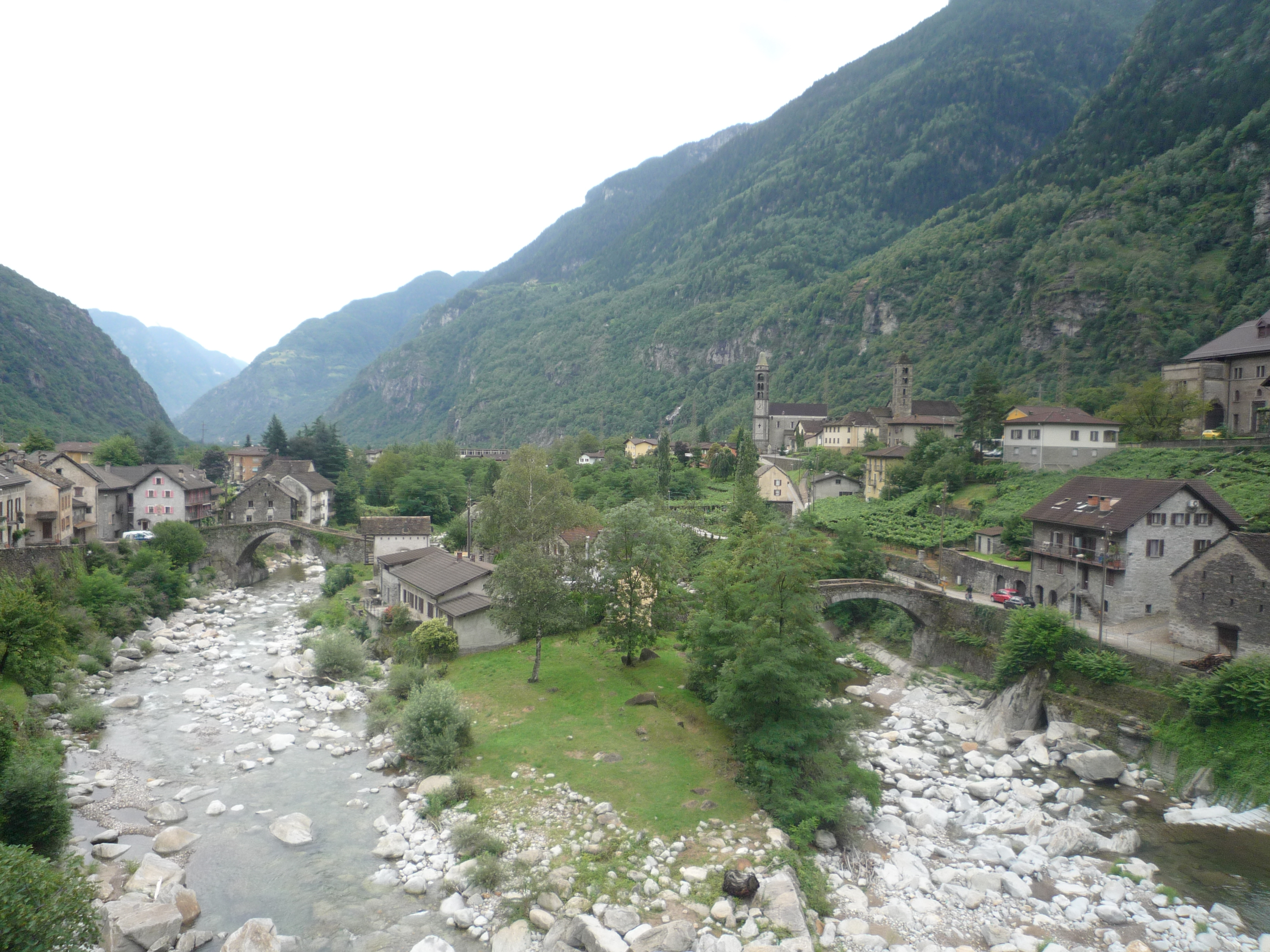
- Giornico village

- Flag Coat of arms
- Location of Giornico
- Location within Switzerland Location within Canton of Ticino
- Coordinates: 46°24′N 8°52′E
- Country: Switzerland
- Canton: Ticino
- District: Leventina

Government
  - Mayor: Sindaco

Area
  - Total: 19.5 km^{2} (7.5 sq mi)
- Elevation: 391 m (1,283 ft)

Population (December 2004)
  - Total: 943
  - Density: 48.4/km^{2} (125/sq mi)
- Time zone: UTC+01:00 (CET)
  - Summer (DST): UTC+02:00 (CEST)
- Postal code: 6745
- SFOS number: 5073
- ISO 3166 code: CH-TI
- Surrounded by: Anzonico, Bodio, Cavagnago, Chironico, Frasco, Personico, Sobrio
- Website: www.giornico.ch

Giornico is a municipality in the district of Leventina in the canton of Ticino in Switzerland. On 6 April 2025, Bodio merged into the municipality of Giornico.

== History ==
Giornico is first mentioned around 935-94 as de Iudicibus Giornicensis. In 1202 it was mentioned as Iornico, and around 1210-58 it was mentioned as Zurnigo. Formerly, it was known by the German names of Yrnis or Girnis.

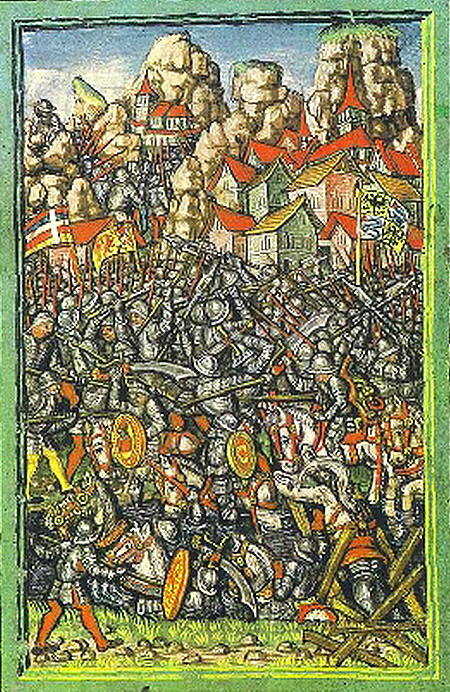
The battle of Giornico

In the Battle of Giornico on 28 December 1478 a Swiss force of 600 defeated 10,000 Milanese troops.

== Geography ==
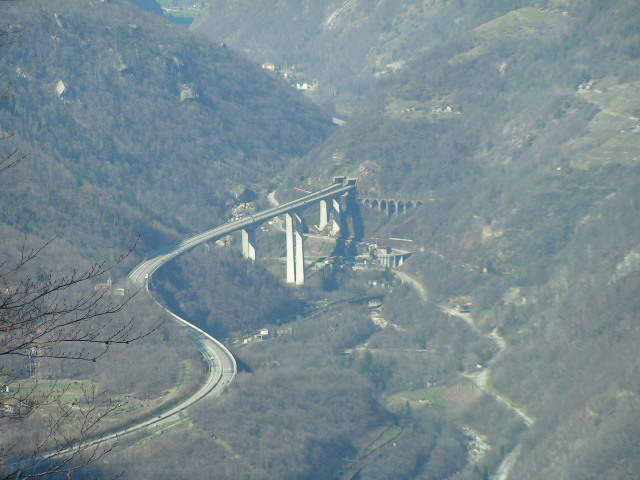
Viaduct over Biaschina gorge

Aerial view (1964)

Giornico has an area, as of 1997, of 19.48 square kilometers (7.52 sq mi). Of this area, 1.01 km^{2} (0.39 sq mi) or 5.2% is used for agricultural purposes, while 11.86 km^{2} (4.58 sq mi) or 60.9% is forested. Of the rest of the land, 1.42 km^{2} (0.55 sq mi) or 7.3% is settled (buildings or roads), 0.4 km^{2} (0.15 sq mi) or 2.1% is either rivers or lakes and 5.08 km^{2} (1.96 sq mi) or 26.1% is unproductive land.

Of the built up area, industrial buildings made up 1.7% of the total area while housing and buildings made up 1.6% and transportation infrastructure made up 3.5%. Out of the forested land, 47.4% of the total land area is heavily forested, while 11.1% is covered in small trees and shrubbery and 2.4% is covered with orchards or small clusters of trees. Of the agricultural land, 2.7% is used for growing crops and 1.6% is used for alpine pastures. All the water in the municipality is flowing water. Of the unproductive areas, 11.2% is unproductive vegetation and 14.8% is too rocky for vegetation.

The municipality is located in the Leventina district, along the Ticino river.

== Coat of arms ==
The blazon of the municipal coat of arms is Per fess Or and Gules overall three mullets, one and two, counterchanged.

== Demographics ==
Giornico has a population (as of December 2020) of 806. As of 2008, 23.2% of the population are resident foreign nationals. Over the last 10 years (1997–2007) the population has changed at a rate of -11.5%.

Most of the population (as of 2000) speaks Italian (93.6%), with Portuguese being second most common ( 2.3%) and German being third ( 1.6%). Of the Swiss national languages (as of 2000), 14 speak German, 2 people speak French, 828 people speak Italian, and 2 people speak Romansh. The remainder (39 people) speak another language.

As of 2008, the gender distribution of the population was 49.2% male and 50.8% female. The population was made up of 315 Swiss men (36.4% of the population), and 111 (12.8%) non-Swiss men. There were 347 Swiss women (40.1%), and 92 (10.6%) non-Swiss women.

In 2008 there were 2 live births to Swiss citizens and 2 births to non-Swiss citizens, and in same time span there were 7 deaths of Swiss citizens and 1 non-Swiss citizen death. Ignoring immigration and emigration, the population of Swiss citizens decreased by 5 while the foreign population increased by 1. There were 2 non-Swiss men and 4 non-Swiss women who immigrated from another country to Switzerland. The total Swiss population change in 2008 (from all sources) was a decrease of 14 and the non-Swiss population change was a decrease of 10 people. This represents a population growth rate of -2.6%.

The age distribution, as of 2009, in Giornico is; 56 children or 6.5% of the population are between 0 and 9 years old and 83 teenagers or 9.6% are between 10 and 19. Of the adult population, 72 people or 8.3% of the population are between 20 and 29 years old. 112 people or 12.9% are between 30 and 39, 155 people or 17.9% are between 40 and 49, and 123 people or 14.2% are between 50 and 59. The senior population distribution is 115 people or 13.3% of the population are between 60 and 69 years old, 94 people or 10.9% are between 70 and 79, there are 55 people or 6.4% who are over 80.

As of 2000, there were 380 private households in the municipality, and an average of 2.3 persons per household. In 2000 there were 244 single family homes (or 71.3% of the total) out of a total of 342 inhabited buildings. There were 50 two family buildings (14.6%) and 31 multi-family buildings (9.1%). There were also 17 buildings in the municipality that were multipurpose buildings (used for both housing and commercial or another purpose).

The vacancy rate for the municipality, in 2008, was 0%. In 2000 there were 517 apartments in the municipality. The most common apartment size was the 4 room apartment of which there were 180. There were 16 single room apartments and 106 apartments with five or more rooms. Of these apartments, a total of 374 apartments (72.3% of the total) were permanently occupied, while 83 apartments (16.1%) were seasonally occupied and 60 apartments (11.6%) were empty. As of 2007, the construction rate of new housing units was 0 new units per 1000 residents.

The historical population is given in the following table:

| year | population |
|---|---|
| 1567 | 115 Hearths |
| 1745 | 510 |
| 1850 | 707 |
| 1880 | 2,147 |
| 1900 | 768 |
| 1950 | 820 |
| 1970 | 1,389 |
| 2000 | 1,885 |

== Heritage sites of national significance ==
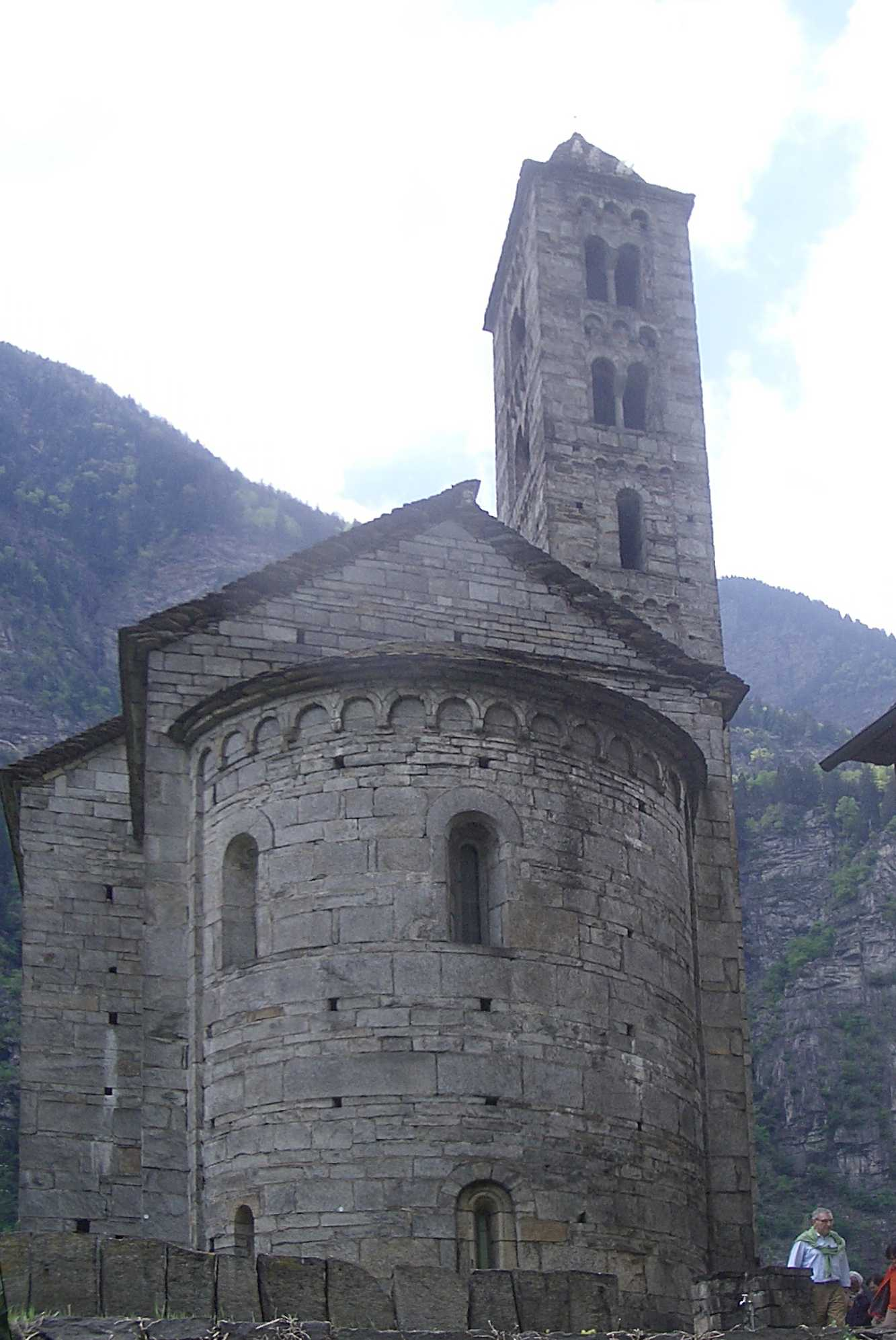
Church of S. Nicolao

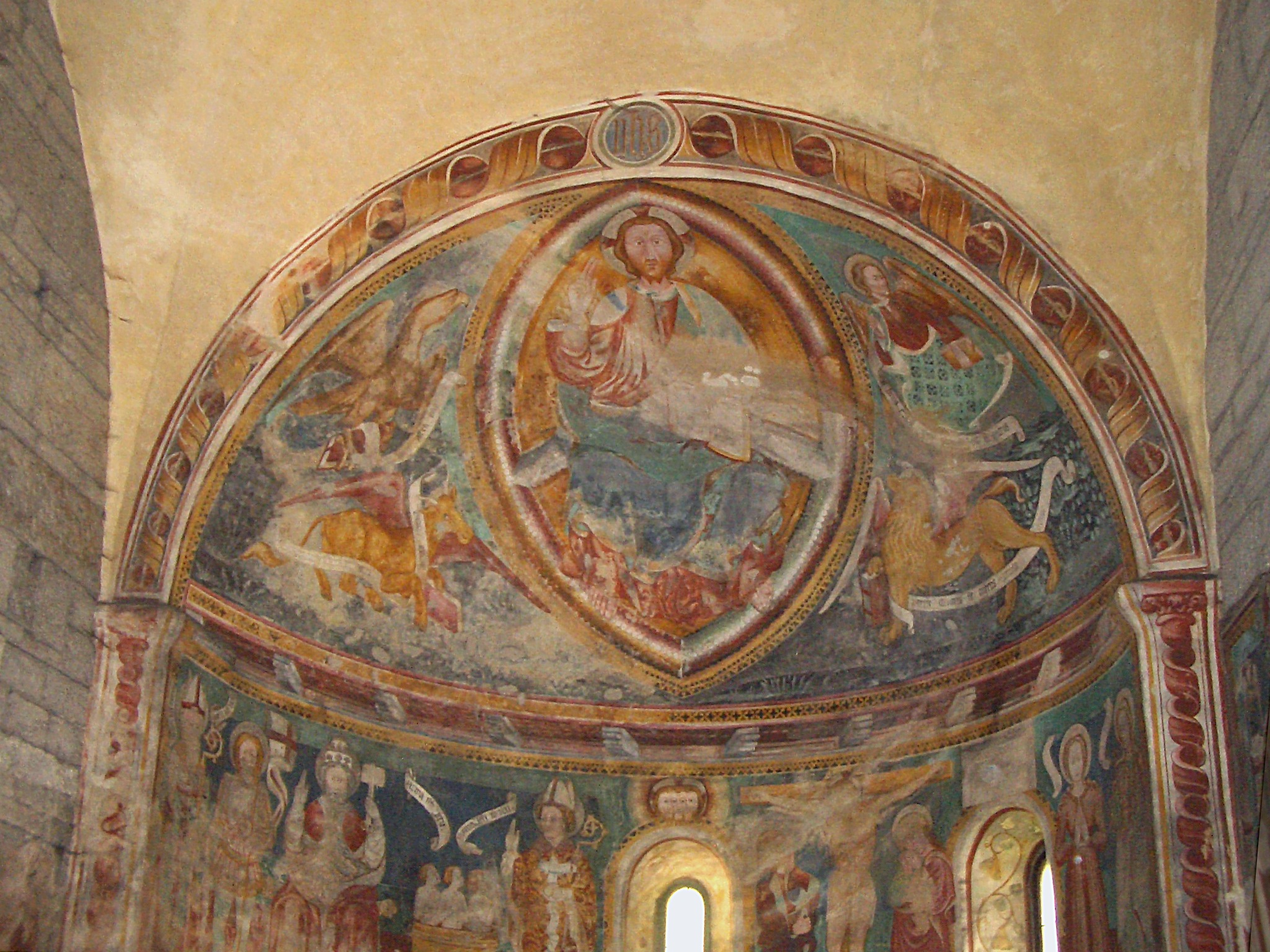
Interior of the Church of S. Nicolao

The Caslasc ruins, the Churches of S. Maria del Castello, S. Nicolao, S. Pellegrino and the Torre di Attone are listed as Swiss heritage site of national significance. The entire village of Giornico is part of the Inventory of Swiss Heritage Sites.

== Politics ==
In the 2007 federal election the most popular party was the CVP which received 34.49% of the vote. The next three most popular parties were the FDP (27.61%), the SP (18.54%) and the Ticino League (14.52%). In the federal election, a total of 277 votes were cast, and the voter turnout was 47.5%.

In the 2007 Gran Consiglio election, there were a total of 585 registered voters in Giornico, of which 421 or 72.0% voted. 7 blank ballots were cast, leaving 414 valid ballots in the election. The most popular party was the PPD+GenGiova which received 106 or 25.6% of the vote. The next three most popular parties were; the PLRT (with 97 or 23.4%), the PS (with 72 or 17.4%) and the SSI (with 68 or 16.4%).

In the 2007 Consiglio di Stato election, 3 blank ballots were cast, leaving 419 valid ballots in the election. The most popular party was the PPD which received 108 or 25.8% of the vote. The next three most popular parties were; the PLRT (with 98 or 23.4%), the PS (with 77 or 18.4%) and the LEGA (with 65 or 15.5%).

== Economy ==
As of 2007, Giornico had an unemployment rate of 4.41%. As of 2005, there were 22 people employed in the primary economic sector and about 14 businesses involved in this sector. 204 people were employed in the secondary sector and there were 11 businesses in this sector. 112 people were employed in the tertiary sector, with 26 businesses in this sector. There were 382 residents of the municipality who were employed in some capacity, of which females made up 35.9% of the workforce.

In 2000, there were 133 workers who commuted into the municipality and 258 workers who commuted away. The municipality is a net exporter of workers, with about 1.9 workers leaving the municipality for every one entering. Of the working population, 6% used public transportation to get to work, and 65.7% used a private car.

== Religion ==
From the 2000 census, 778 or 87.9% were Roman Catholic, while 13 or 1.5% belonged to the Swiss Reformed Church. There are 70 individuals (or about 7.91% of the population) who belong to another church (not listed on the census), and 24 individuals (or about 2.71% of the population) did not answer the question.

== Education ==
The entire Swiss population is generally well educated. In Giornico about 59.5% of the population (between age 25-64) have completed either non-mandatory upper secondary education or additional higher education (either university or a Fachhochschule).

In Giornico there were a total of 122 students (as of 2009). The Ticino education system provides up to three years of non-mandatory kindergarten and in Giornico there were 15 children in kindergarten. The primary school program lasts for five years and includes both a standard school and a special school. In the municipality, 33 students attended the standard primary schools and 2 students attended the special school. In the lower secondary school system, students either attend a two-year middle school followed by a two-year pre-apprenticeship or they attend a four-year program to prepare for higher education. There were 33 students in the two-year middle school and 1 in their pre-apprenticeship, while 6 students were in the four-year advanced program.

The upper secondary school includes several options, but at the end of the upper secondary program, a student will be prepared to enter a trade or to continue on to a university or college. In Ticino, vocational students may either attend school while working on their internship or apprenticeship (which takes three or four years) or may attend school followed by an internship or apprenticeship (which takes one year as a full-time student or one and a half to two years as a part-time student). There were 11 vocational students who were attending school full-time and 18 who attend part-time.

The professional program lasts three years and prepares a student for a job in engineering, nursing, computer science, business, tourism and similar fields. There were 3 students in the professional program.

As of 2000, there were 192 students in Giornico who came from another municipality, while 27 residents attended schools outside the municipality.
