= Travaglia =

Travaglia is an Italian surname. Notable people with the surname include:

- Michael Travaglia, American convicted spree killer
- Renato Travaglia (born 1965), Italian rally driver
- Simon Travaglia, creator of the Bastard Operator From Hell
- Stefano Travaglia (born 1991), Italian tennis player
- Tobie Travaglia, Australian rules footballer

== See also ==
- Travaglio
- Valtravaglia
