= Battle of Crevola =

- Part of the Transalpine campaigns
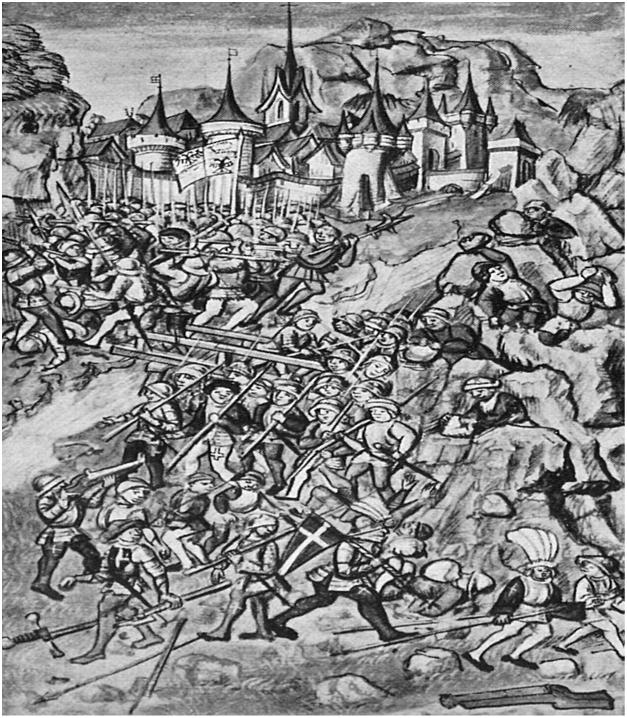
- The battle of Crevola in the Luzerner Schilling
Date	April 28, 1487
Location	Crevoladossola, Piedmont
Result	Milanese victory

Belligerents
Duchy of Milan	Old Swiss Confederacy: Valais; Lucerne

Commanders and leaders
Renato Trivulzio; Giberto Borromeo; Giampietro Bergamino	Jost von Silenen; Albin von Silenen (POW)

Strength
1,200 Cavalry; 2,000 Infantry total of 3,500 troops	6,000 Infantry; 1,000 Swiss joined from the Saluzzo Campaign

Casualties and losses
Unknown	800–1,000 killed

The Battle of Crevola was fought in the spring of 1487, between a marauding Swiss army from the Valais and Lucerne and troops from the Duchy of Milan, for the supremacy of the Val d'Ossola (Eschental) .

== Prelude ==
In the year 1487, for unknown but petty reasons, Bishop Jost von Silenen entered into dispute with the Count of Arona, whose seignory was the Duke of Milan. The Knight Albin von Silenen, brother of Bishop Jost von Silenen, was appointed the leader of this military expedition. As soon as the Simplon pass was passable, the Swiss crossed into the Val d'Ossola; here they were joined by another 1,000 Swiss, who were returning from Savoy.

== Battle ==
The Swiss besieged Domo, occupied the castle of Mattarella, and terribly ravaged the impoverished valleys. The Duke of Milan, however, ordered the Ossolani to keep the Swiss inactive with false peace negotiations, until the duchy could dispatch a sufficient army. Once the troops were assembled, they were split into three separate corps under the command of Renato Trivulzio, Count Borromeo, and Gio. Pietro Bergamino. The Swiss were once again marauding in the villages of the Valle Vigezzo, when they were assaulted by the Milanese troops from three sides. The Swiss formed a square and a murderous combat ensued, in which the Swiss lost 800-1000 men and all their baggage. The rest of the Swiss troops were allowed to flee into the impassable mountain range. The corpses of the dead Swiss were desecrated by the local peasants: the heads and fingers were cut off, the heads put on pikes and the fingers used as hat decorations.

== Aftermath ==
Further bloodshed was however prevented, when a legation of the Old Swiss Confederacy negotiated a peace treaty with the Duchy of Milan on July 23, 1487. At ponte di Crevola, the Ossolani dedicated an Oratory to Martyr Saint Vitalis in honour and remembrance of this victorious battle.

== See also ==
- Battles of the Old Swiss Confederacy
