= Nätschen =

Mountain and ski area in Switzerland

Coordinates: 46°38′31″N 8°36′28″E

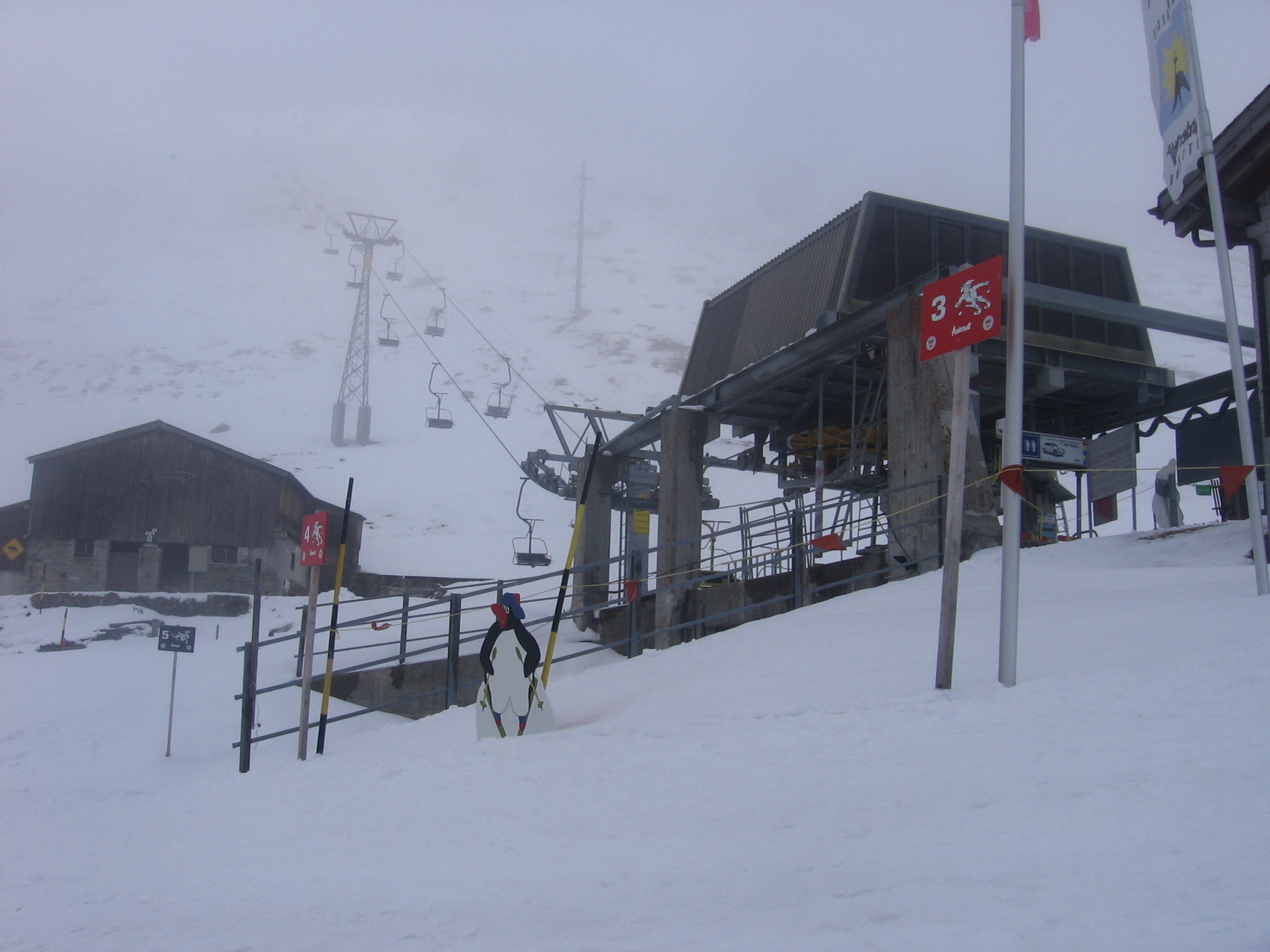
- The bottom of Nätschen
- Interactive map of Nätschen
- Location: Gotthard Oberalp Arena; Andermatt; Nätschen; Gütsch
- Top elevation: 2,344 m (7,690 ft)
- Base elevation: 1,444 m (4,738 ft)
- Trails: 11 Runs / 21km 3 Expert/black / 8km 3 Intermediate/red / 5km 2 Easy/blue / 8km 3 Off-piste/yellow
- Lift system: 4 Lifts; 1 2-man Chairlift; 1 Detachable 4-man Chairlift; 2 T-Bars
- Terrain parks: 1 Park

Nätschen is a mountain location and ski area above Andermatt, in the Canton of Uri, Switzerland. Higher up on Nätschen the mountain is known as Gütsch. Its highest point is 2,344 m (7,690 ft). It is one of the mountains in the Gotthard Oberalp Arena, as is Gemsstock, which is on the other side of Andermatt. It has 11 ski runs, totaling approximately 21 km of ski pistes, and 4 ski lifts, including a Detachable 4-man Chairlift. Nätschen's lifts are powered by three wind turbines, two of which were installed in late 2010 (E-44), the other in 2004 (E-40). These turbines are all made by Enercon. Nätschen has a railway station, run by the Matterhorn Gotthard Bahn, which is between Andermatt and Disentis/Mustér.

== Skiing ==
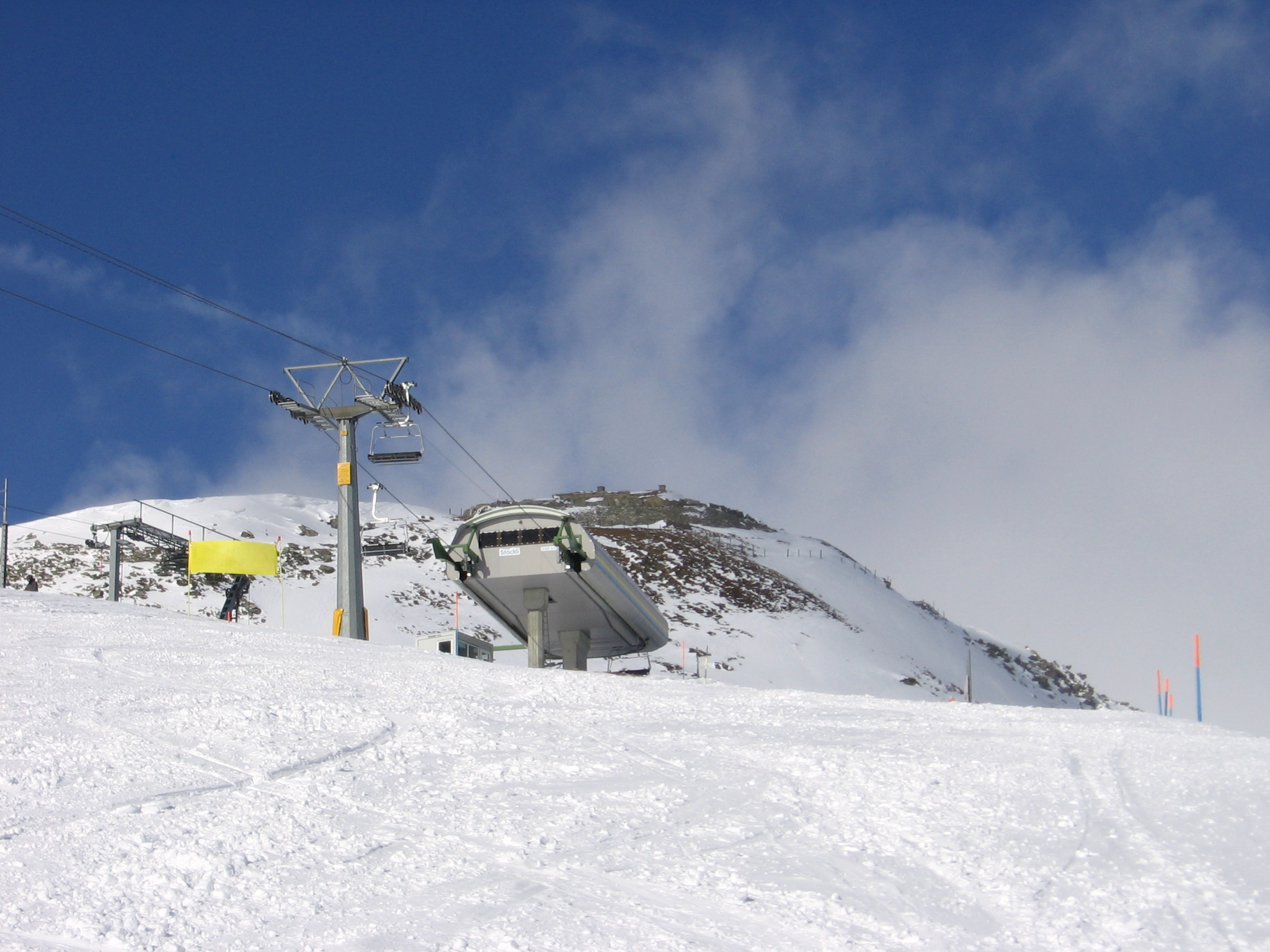
The top terminal of the Detachable 4-man Chairlift

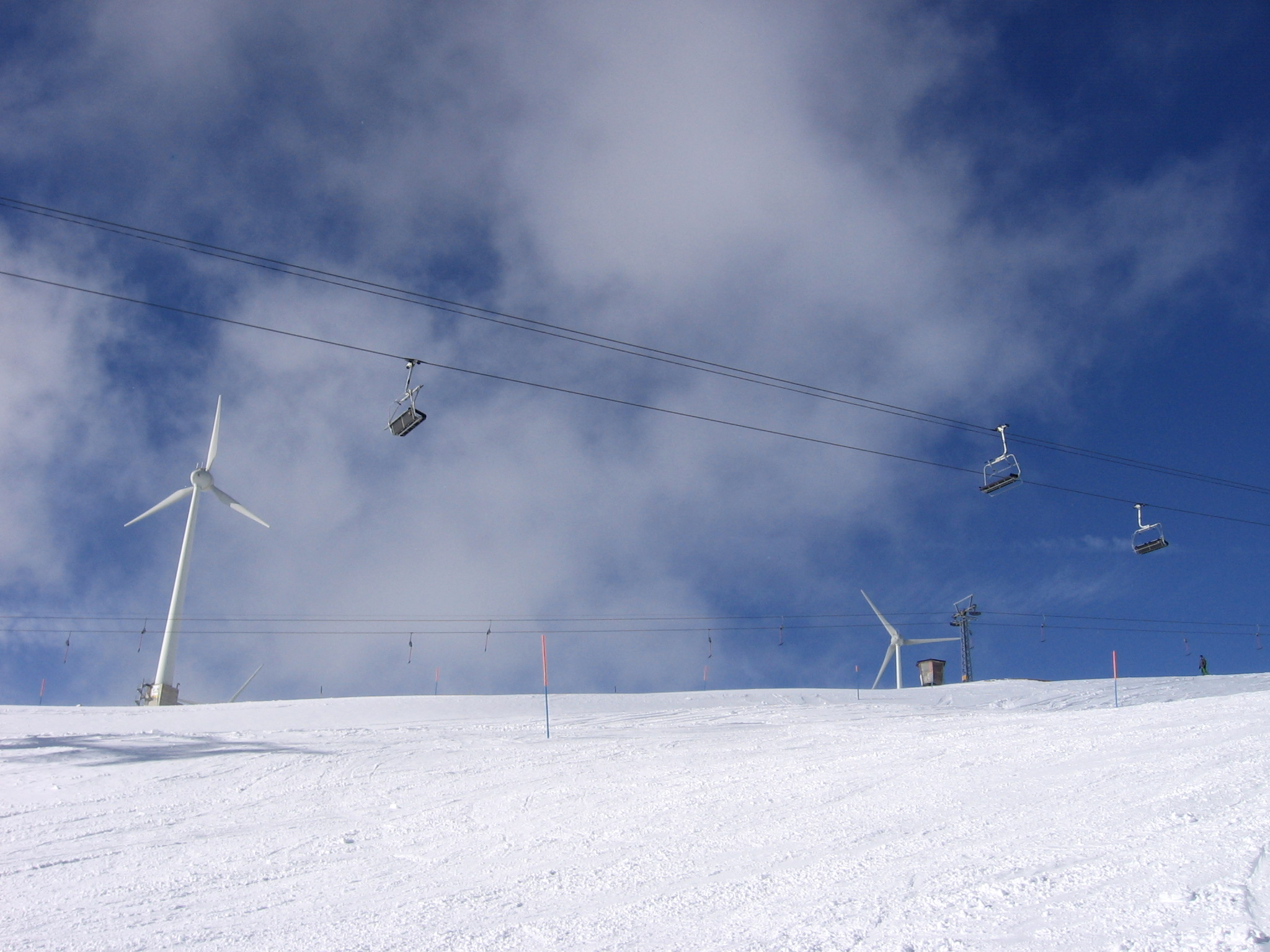
Naetschen's main skiing area

=== Ski runs ===
Nätschen has a 2-man chairlift up to the middle, where one may:

- Go down an easy run (that is actually running down a road, so it is not very steep. This is used as the sledging route as well)
- Go down an intermediate run
- Go down an off-piste run
- Go up a detachable 4-man chairlift

If one chooses to go up more, there are:

- An easy run
- 2 off-piste runs
- 3 expert runs
- 2 intermediate runs

=== Ski lifts ===
Nätschen has four ski lifts, all made by Garaventa.

Name	Type	Height of ground station(m)	Height of mountain station(m)	Construction year
Andermatt - Nätschen	2-man chairlift	1451	1858	1983
Dürstelen	T-bar	2010	2314	1981
Grossboden	T-bar	2150	2364	1994
Nätschen - Stöckli	Detachable 4-man chairlift	1842	2314	1994

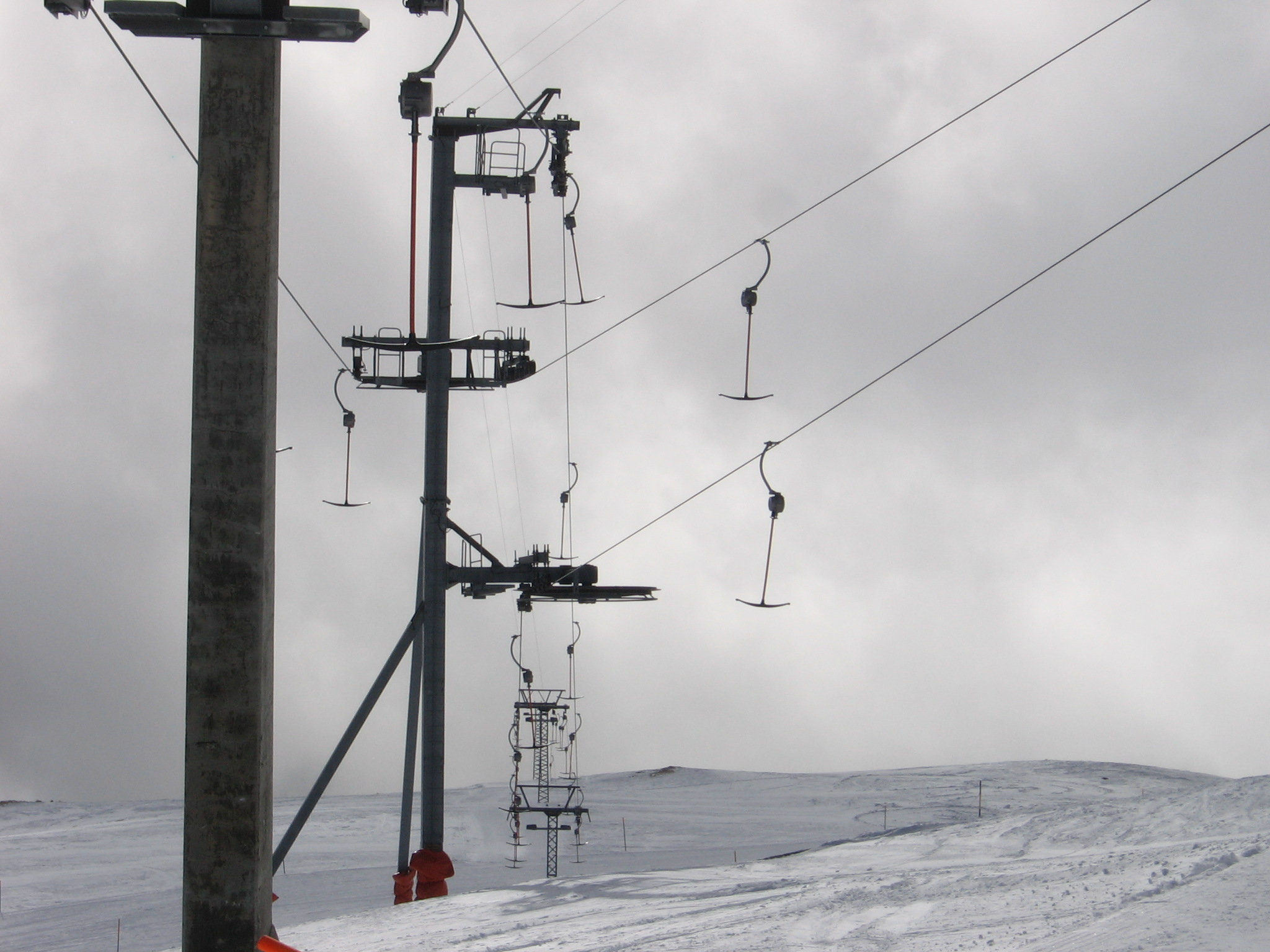
The Dürstelen T-bar has a 30-degree left turn.

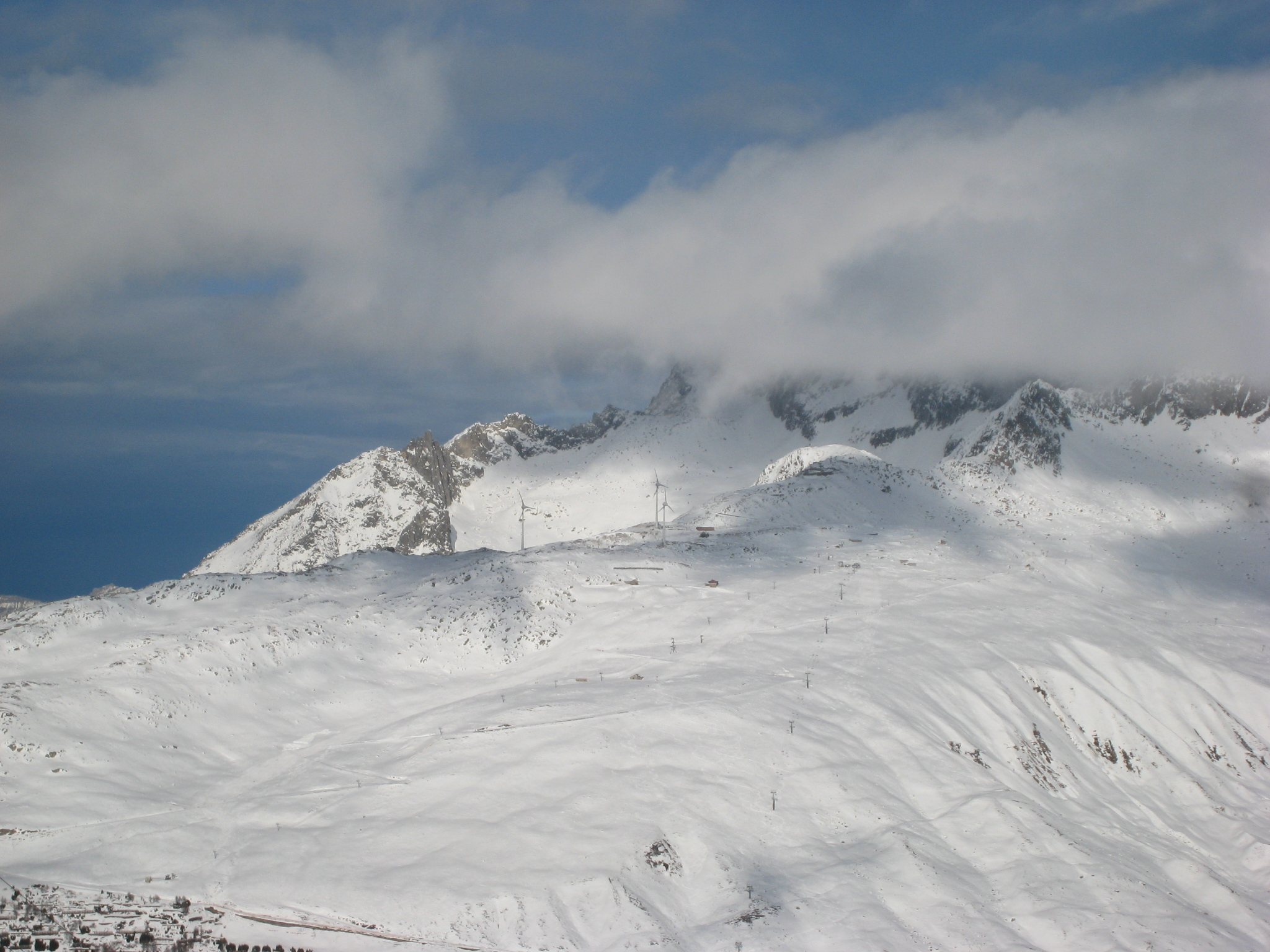
A clear plan of most of the ski runs and lifts, and the wind turbines

=== Ski season ===
Because Nätschen is fairly low down, and south-west facing, all of its lifts and runs all close relatively early for the summer season, sometimes even as early as the start of March. None of its lifts are open in the summer.

=== Future ===
In 2009 plans to overhaul, replace, update, and insert new ski lifts and runs on Naetschen were announced. This will be part of Orascom Hotels and Development's Andermatt project to make Andermatt a large holiday resort. These plans include

- Several new ski lifts
  - A new 8-man gondola from the village up to the middle of Nätschen
  - A new combined installation (8-man gondolas and 6-man chairlifts) from the middle of Nätschen to the top
- A connection with the Oberalp/Sedrun ski area with a three lifts; an 8-man gondola and two detachable 4-man chairlifts passing Schneehühnerstock, which is currently possible by getting the train from Nätschen or walking over the Oberalpsee
- Over twice the amount of ski slopes, with most of these new runs being intermediate and expert runs

In 2010 there were two new wind turbines installed on Nätschen, to power the new lifts. These were both Enercon E-44 models. The new lifts will be made by Swedish company SkiStar.

==== Connection with Oberalp ====
In 2009 plans to connect Nätschen's ski area with the Oberalp/Sedrun ski area were announced. This will be done by having 3 ski lifts, two detachable 4-man chairlifts and an 8-man gondola (with a middle station), and approximately 20 km of ski pistes. Most of these pistes will be intermediate/red runs, but with a few easy/blue runs and expert/black runs.

The runs will go from the top of Nätschen (Gütsch), to the Oberalppass station. The T-bar at Oberalppass station will be replaced by a detachable 6-man chairlift.

==== Lift from Göschenen ====
There are plans to construct a gondola running from Göschenen to the top of Naetschen. This will allow for quicker, easier access from other areas, and it will mean Andermatt will not have as much traffic as previously. If arriving from Göschenen, it would save approximately half an hour of time than having to go up to Andermatt, and it will be easier to get onto the slopes.

== Railway station ==
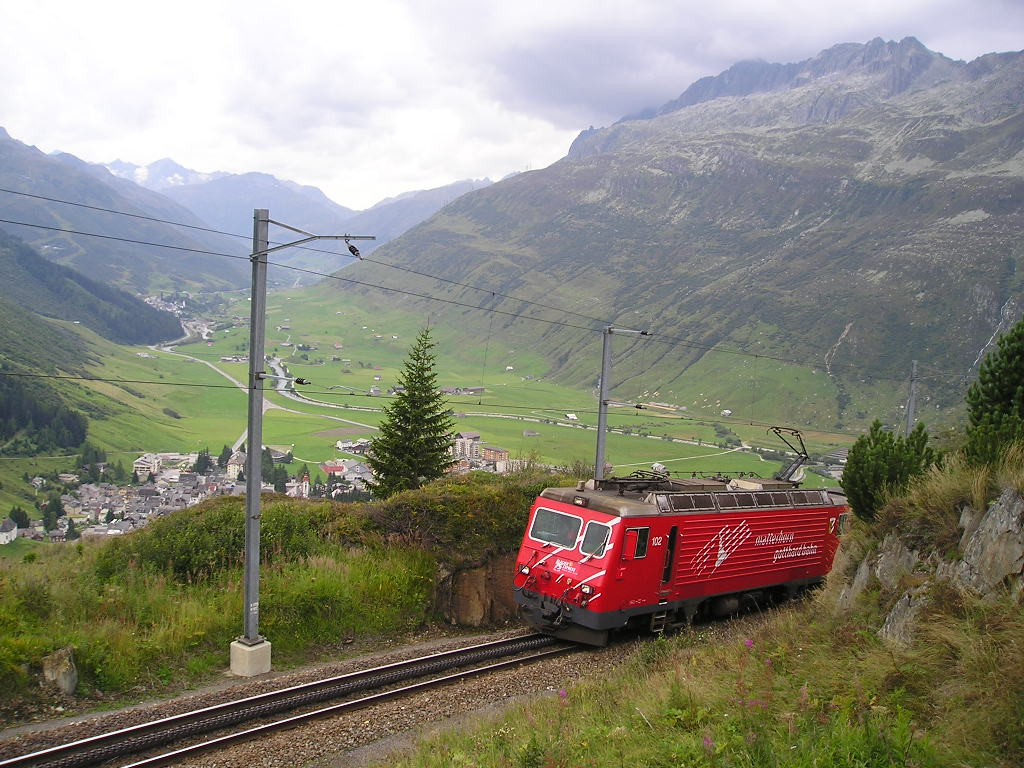
A train on its way up Nätschen towards the railway station. Andermatt is in the left of the picture.

Nätschen's railway station is owned, run, and served by the Matterhorn Gotthard Bahn. It has one platform, and a passing track for trains which need to pass each other — a common occurrence given that the line is almost all single track, and the trains are running at a tight schedule. Public trains are operated every hour each direction. The station also sees Glacier Express trains and car shuttle trains (in the winter only) passing through it. The station has a waiting room.

== Climate ==
Climate data for Gütsch ob Andermatt, elevation 2,286 m (7,500 ft), (1991–2020)
Month	Jan	Feb	Mar	Apr	May	Jun	Jul	Aug	Sep	Oct	Nov	Dec	Year
Mean daily maximum °C (°F)	−3.0 (26.6)	−3.5 (25.7)	−1.5 (29.3)	0.9 (33.6)	5.4 (41.7)	10.5 (50.9)	12.9 (55.2)	13.1 (55.6)	9.3 (48.7)	5.9 (42.6)	0.4 (32.7)	−2.2 (28.0)	4.0 (39.2)
Daily mean °C (°F)	−5.5 (22.1)	−6.1 (21.0)	−4.1 (24.6)	−1.6 (29.1)	2.5 (36.5)	6.6 (43.9)	8.8 (47.8)	9.0 (48.2)	5.4 (41.7)	2.4 (36.3)	−2.2 (28.0)	−4.7 (23.5)	0.9 (33.6)
Mean daily minimum °C (°F)	−8.3 (17.1)	−8.9 (16.0)	−6.8 (19.8)	−4.2 (24.4)	−0.2 (31.6)	3.5 (38.3)	5.6 (42.1)	6.0 (42.8)	2.6 (36.7)	−0.3 (31.5)	−4.7 (23.5)	−7.4 (18.7)	−1.9 (28.6)
Average precipitation mm (inches)	128.4 (5.06)	99.7 (3.93)	115.0 (4.53)	111.6 (4.39)	131.5 (5.18)	124.7 (4.91)	118.3 (4.66)	141.0 (5.55)	115.4 (4.54)	100.2 (3.94)	116.5 (4.59)	121.1 (4.77)	1,423.4 (56.04)
Average snowfall cm (inches)	171.5 (67.5)	159.5 (62.8)	142.3 (56.0)	141.9 (55.9)	77.4 (30.5)	27.8 (10.9)	6.1 (2.4)	6.2 (2.4)	23.2 (9.1)	53.3 (21.0)	130.3 (51.3)	134.9 (53.1)	1,074.4 (423.0)
Average precipitation days (≥ 1.0 mm)	10.6	9.8	11.2	10.8	12.8	13.9	13.2	13.9	11.0	9.7	10.2	10.7	137.8
Average snowy days (≥ 1.0 cm)	12.9	12.7	14.5	15.5	8.7	4.1	1.0	0.9	4.2	7.2	12.1	13.4	107.2
Average relative humidity (%)	63	67	72	78	80	80	80	79	79	73	72	65	74
Mean monthly sunshine hours	125.6	127.0	157.5	154.7	162.3	185.5	214.2	208.3	170.1	144.6	107.1	108.7	1,865.6
Percentage possible sunshine	52	50	47	40	39	45	51	52	49	49	44	47	47
Source 1: NOAA
Source 2: MeteoSwiss (snow 1981–2010)

== Media ==
In November 2012 Andermatt and Nätschen appeared on the British television series The Gadget Show. Presenters Jason Bradbury and Pollyanna Woodward were testing electric bicycles, scooters, and several mobile phone photo editing applications, on the hills of Nätschen.

== Gallery ==
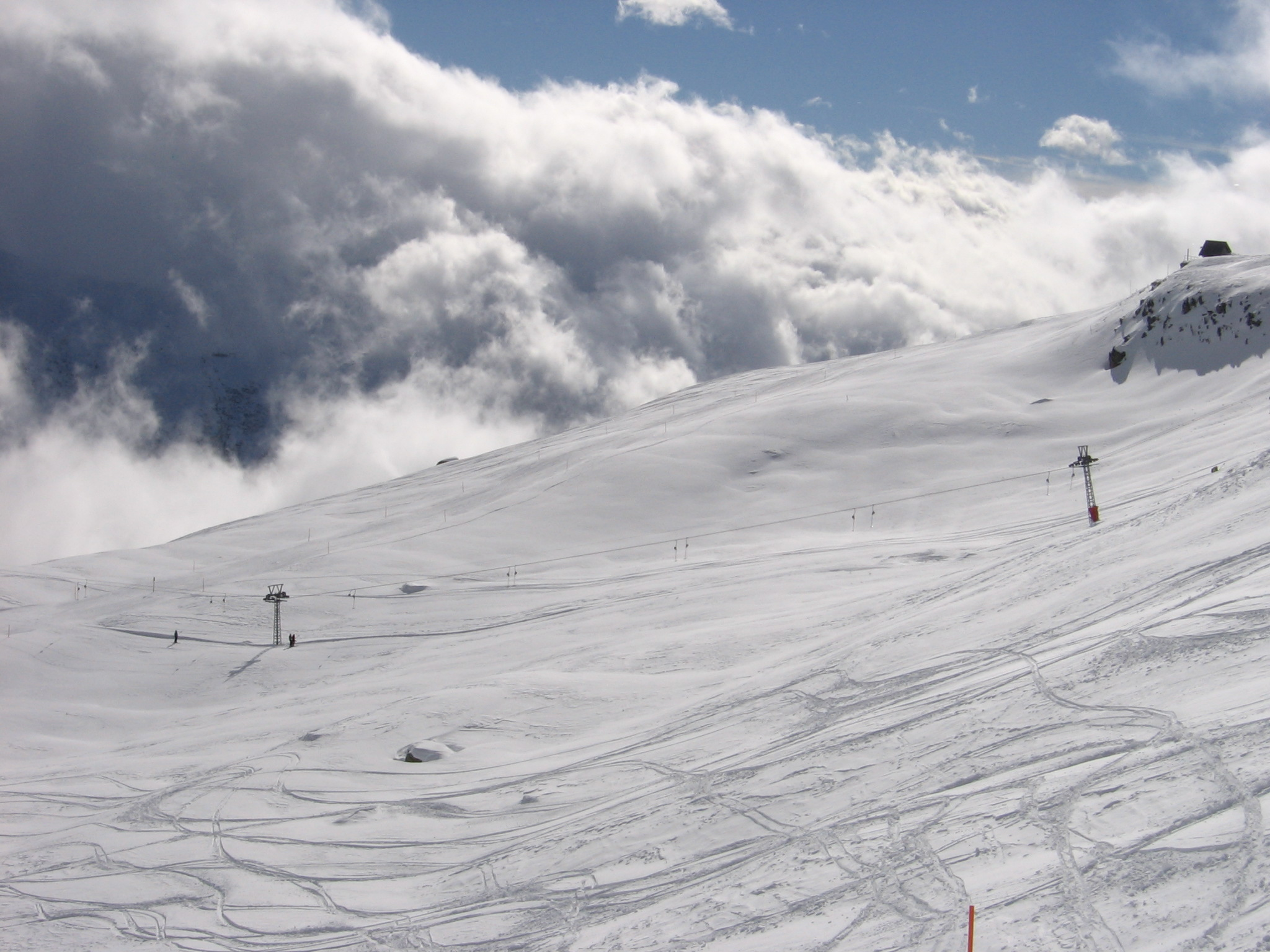

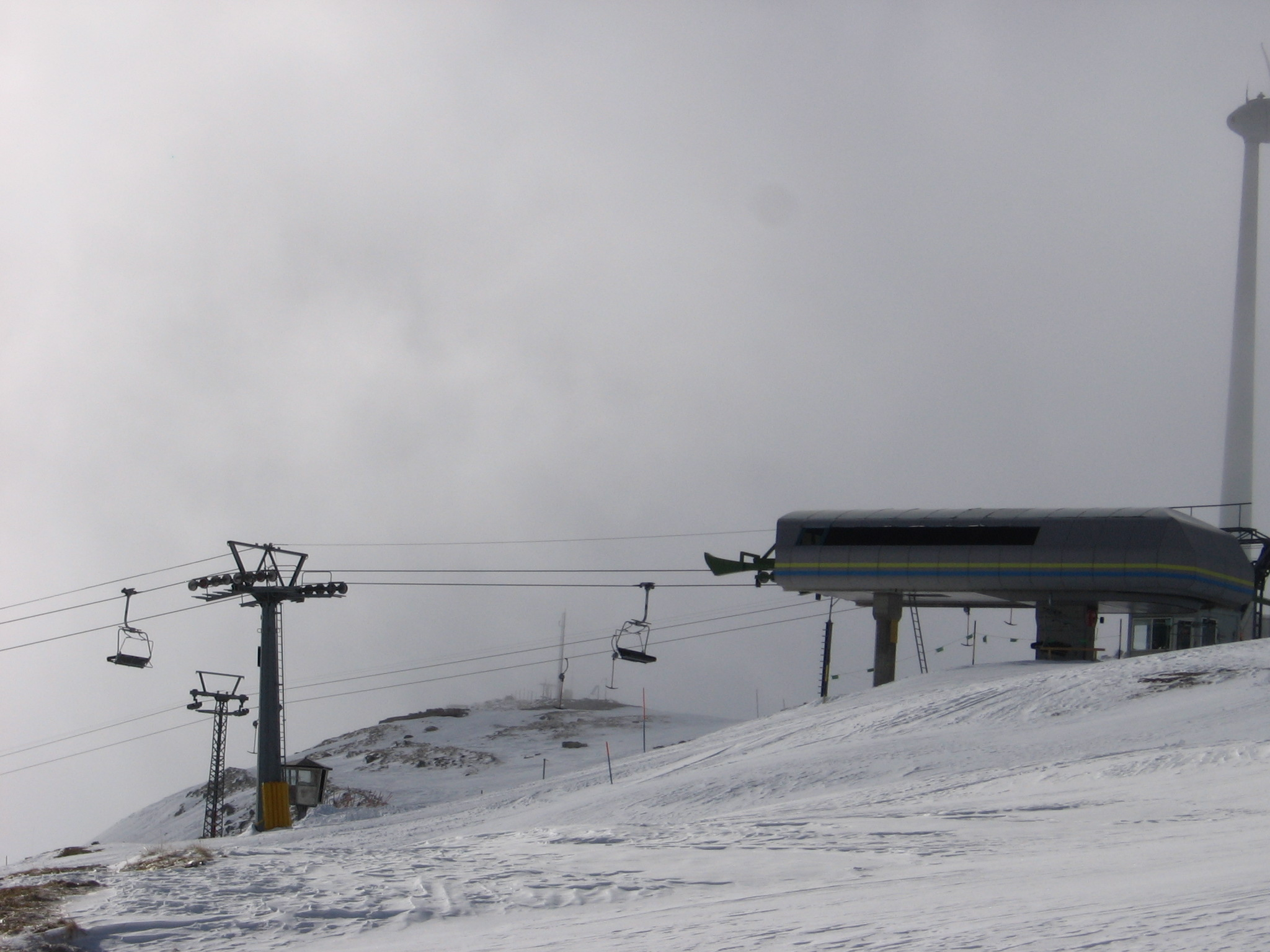

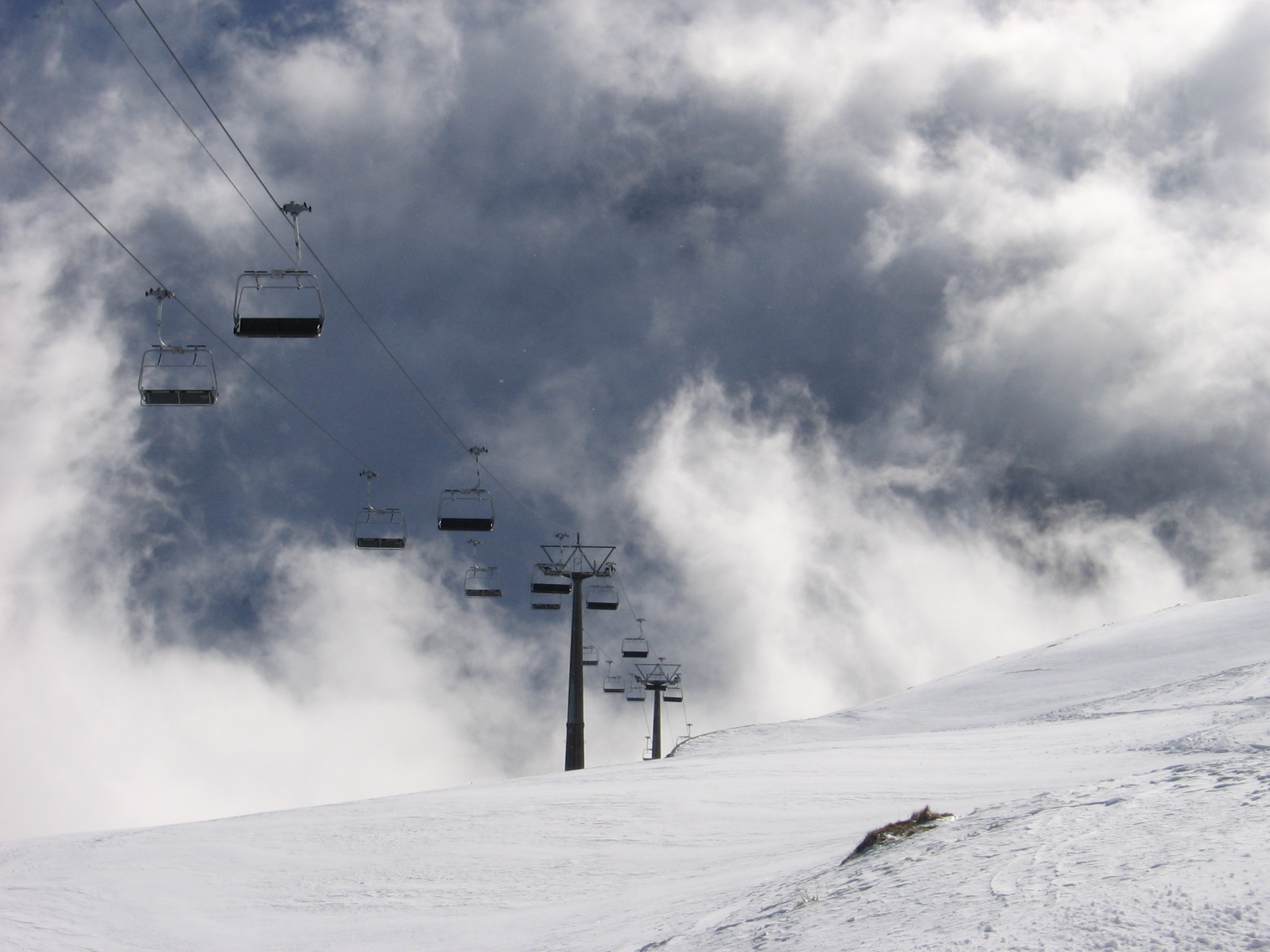

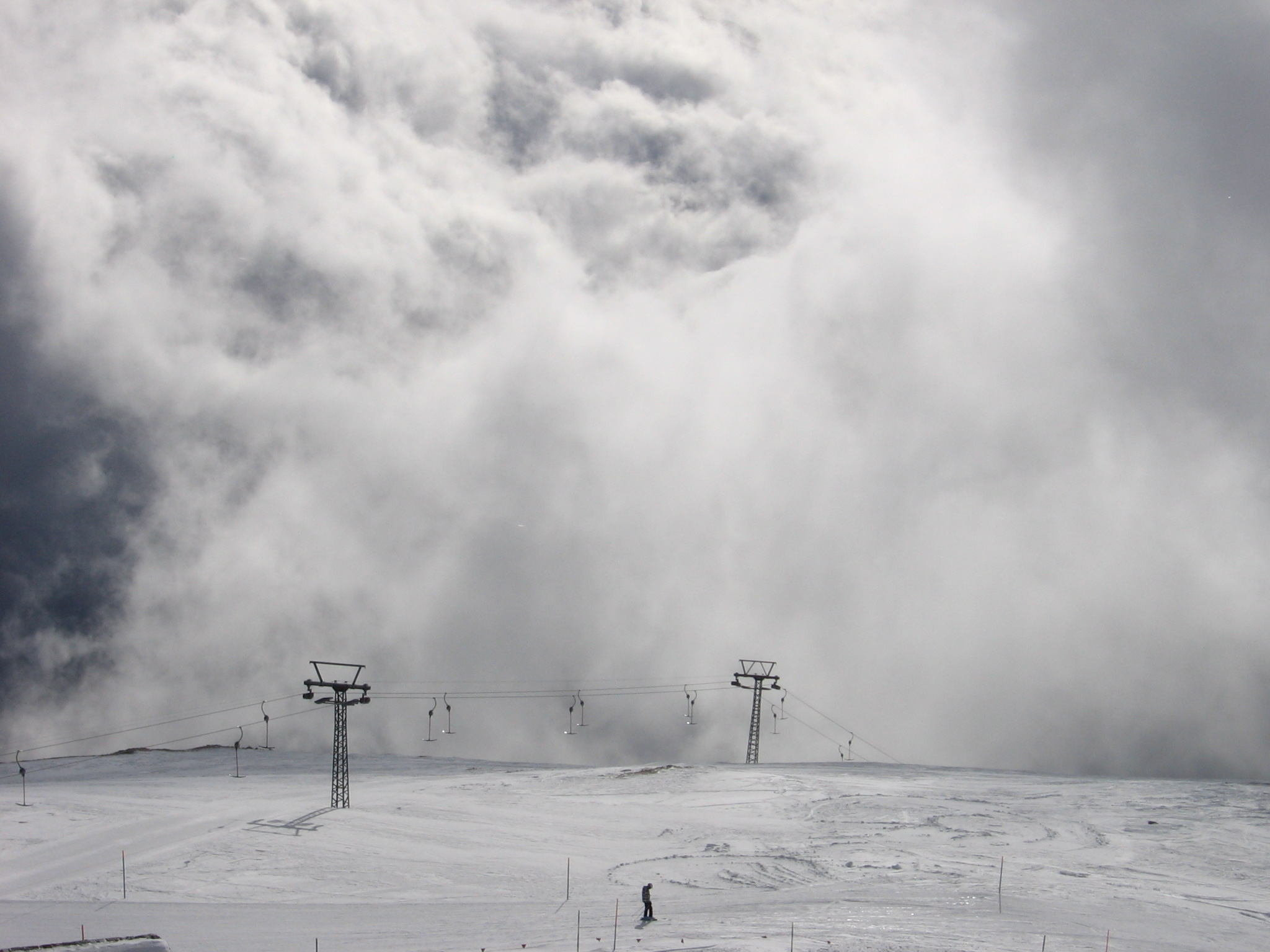

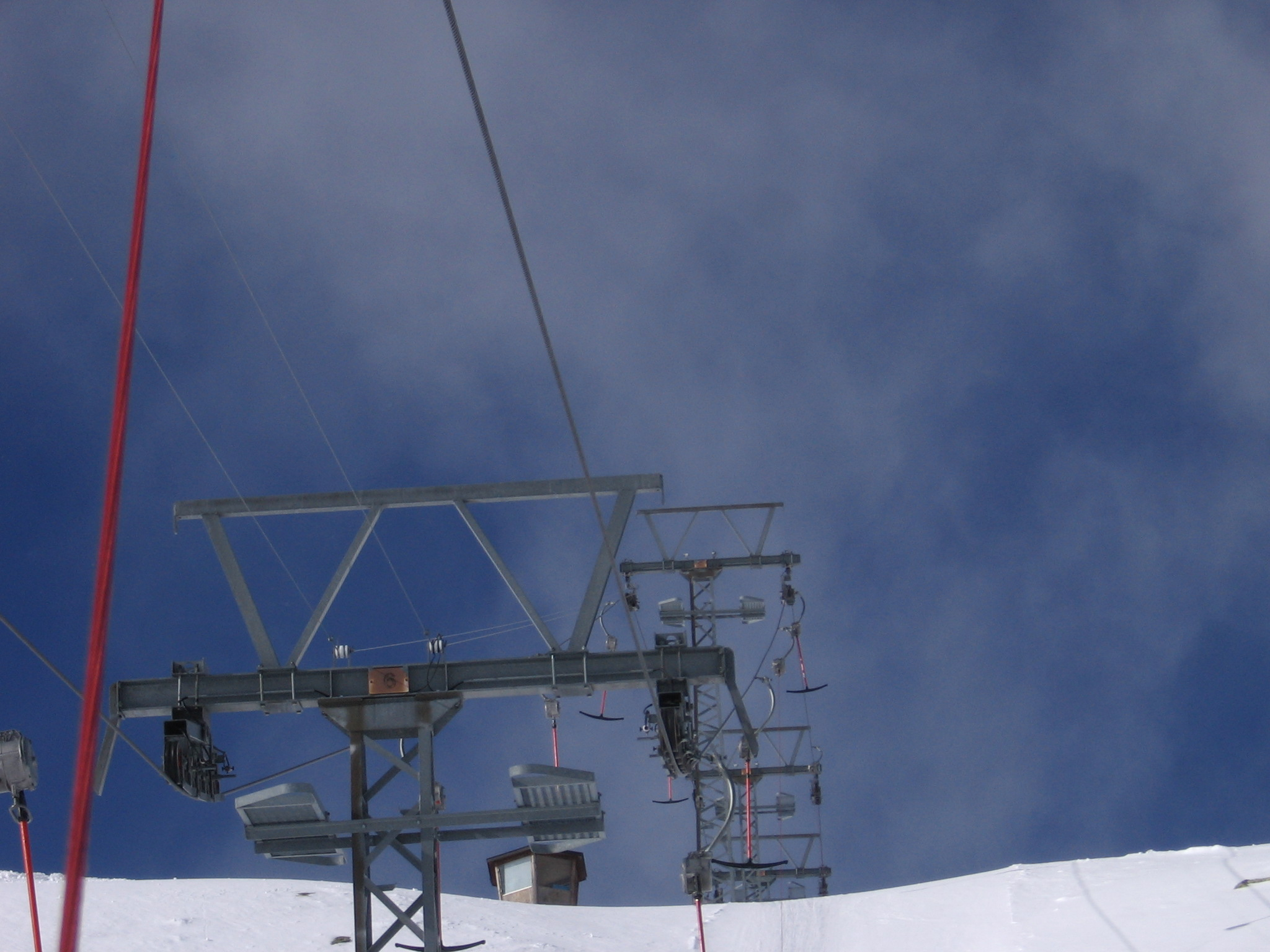

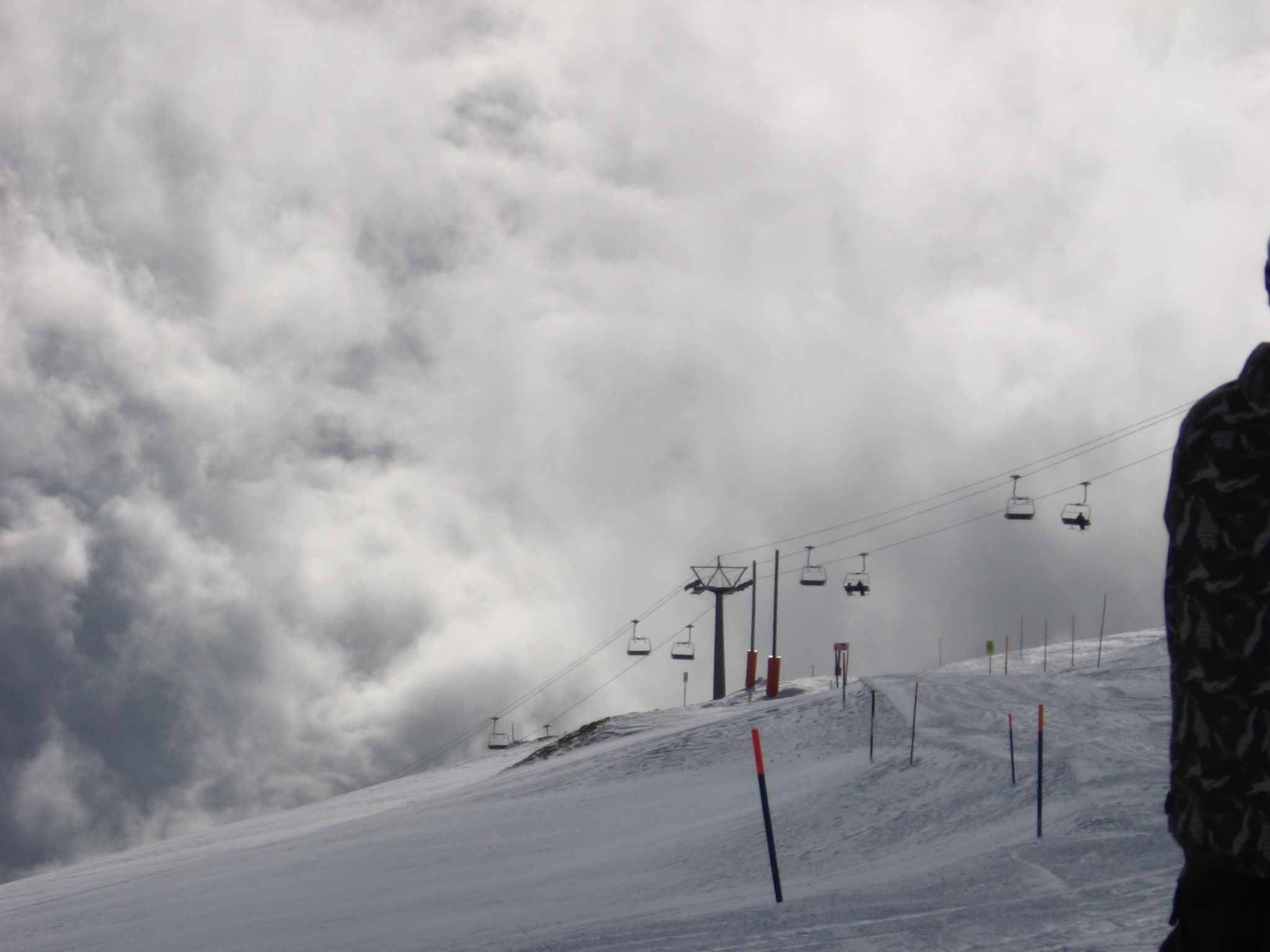

== See also ==
- Andermatt
- Gemsstock
- Gotthard Oberalp Arena
- Canton of Uri
- Matterhorn Gotthard Bahn
- List of ski areas and resorts in Switzerland
