= Skiarena Andermatt-Sedrun =

Ski area in Switzerland

Coordinates: 46.6375°N 8.5930°E

Andermatt-Sedrun Sport AG
- The Andermatt-Sedrun Sport AG logo
- Interactive map of Andermatt-Sedrun Sport AG
- Location: Andermatt, Uri, Central Switzerland; Sedrun, Graubünden, Central Switzerland; Dieni, Graubünden, Central Switzerland; Realp, Uri, Central Switzerland
- Status: Operating
- Owner: Vail Resorts (55% share)
- Trails: 32 runs / 120km 6 expert/black / 36km 17 intermediate/red / 56km 9 easy/blue / 28km 6 off-piste/yellow
- Lift system: 19 lifts 2x 4-man chairlifts 1x detachable 4-man chairlift 6x detachable 6-man chairlift 6x T-bars; 1x 8-man gondola lift 1x 10-man gondola lift 2x cable cars
- Terrain parks: 1 park 1 half pipe 1 ski cross course
- Website: Andermatt-Sedrun-Disentis

The Andermatt-Sedrun Sport AG (previously the Gotthard Oberalp Arena and the Gotthard Oberalp Skiarena (until 2013)) is a ski area located in Andermatt, Sedrun, and Oberalp in Switzerland. It has 16 ski lifts and approximately 30 runs, and just over 100 km of pistes. The ski area covers five separate mountains:

- Gemsstock
- Nätschen
- Sedrun / Oberalp
- Realp (small beginner slope only)
- Valtgeva (small beginner slope only)

It previously included Winterhorn, in Hospental, which was abandoned in 2007.

Train services (run by the Matterhorn Gotthard Bahn) are vital in this resort as they are the only means of transport available to travel from Andermatt (Nätschen and Gemsstock) to Oberalp, Dieni, and Sedrun. Between Andermatt, Hospental, and Realp can be journeyed by car as well as the railway.

== Ski areas ==
=== Gemsstock ===
Gemsstock is located south of Andermatt. It has 7 runs (31 km (19 mi) of pistes) and 4 ski lifts. Gemsstock is suitable for a range of skiers of all abilities, but in particular those who are more advanced.

=== Nätschen ===
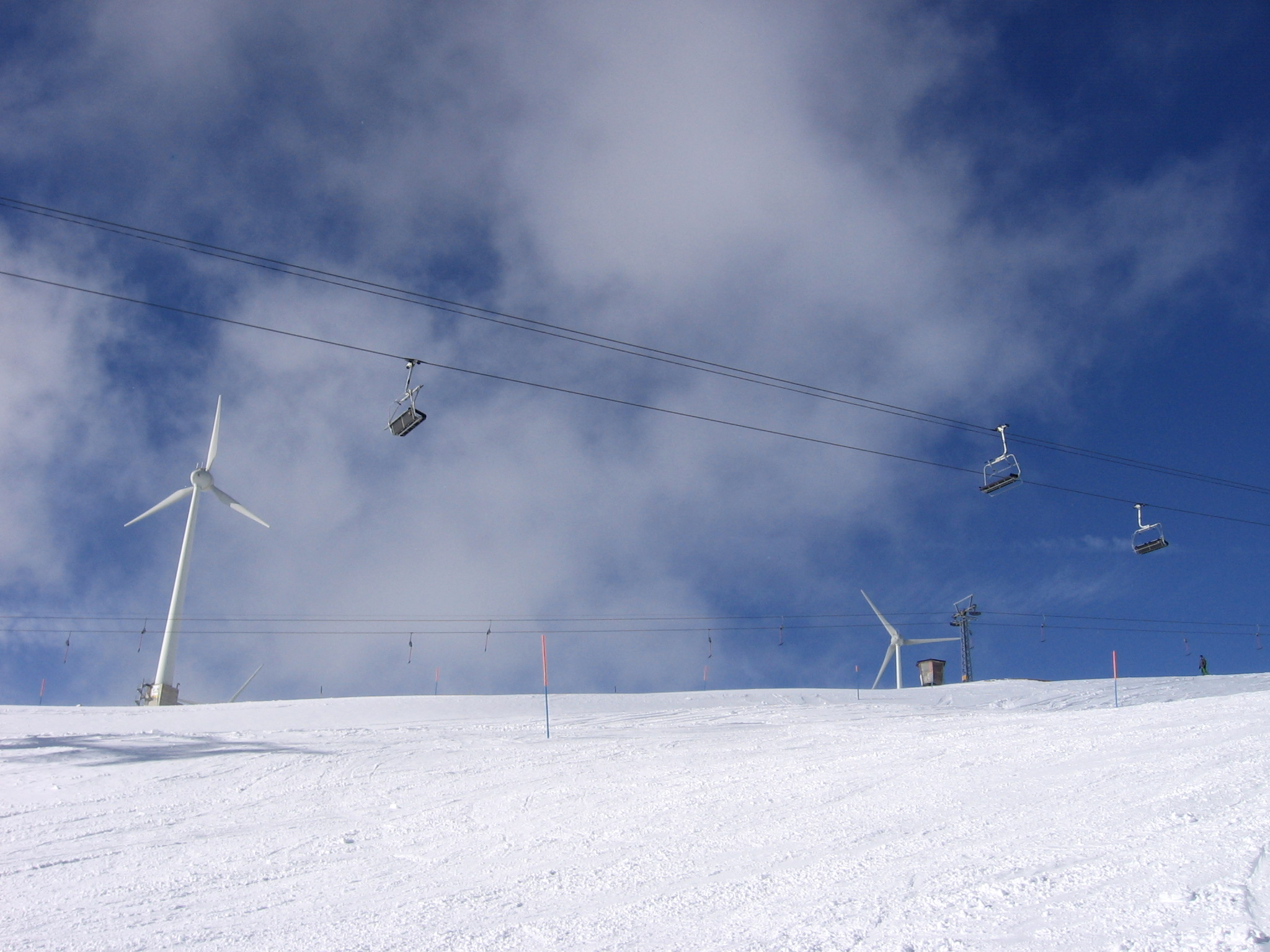
Nätschen's main skiing area, and the Nätschen - Stöckli chairlift and the Dürstelen T-bar

Nätschen is one of the three main mountains making the ski area. It has 24 runs (39 km (24 mi) of pistes) and 5 lifts, and is located north of Andermatt. Nätschen is a mountain more suited for beginners. There is also a skiing area for children, served by two magic carpets. In 2017 and 2018, new lifts were constructed, creating a connection between Nätschen and Oberalp.

Nätschen generally closes early for the summer, as it is south facing and is quite low.

=== Sedrun / Oberalp ===
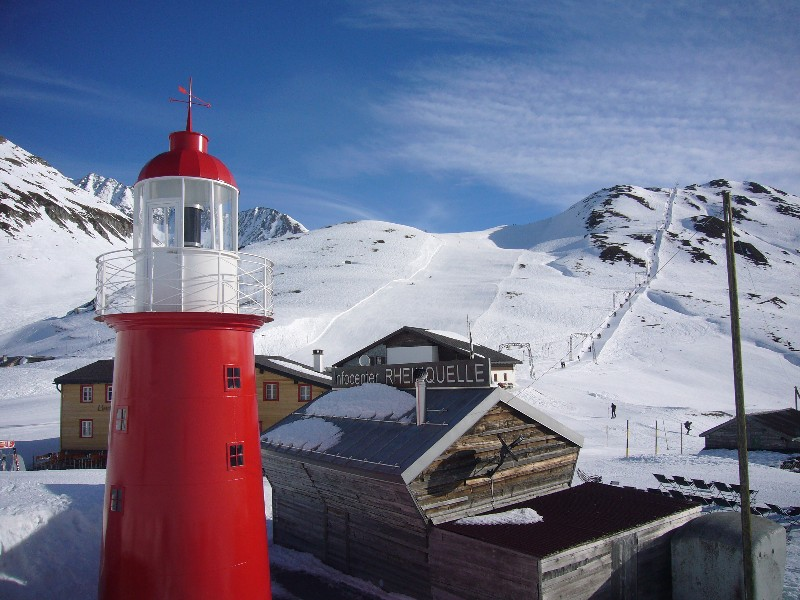
Some of the Oberalp ski area. You can see the old Alpsu lift on the right

Sedrun / Oberalp is located near Dieni, and is the biggest of all of the three mountains' ski areas. It is good for skiers and snowboarders of all levels. It has 7 ski lifts and has 13 pistes (50 km of pistes). There is a large terrain park, a half pipe, and a ski cross course.

=== Realp ===
In Realp there is a single, small T-bar, and a beginner run. There is also cross-country skiing nearby, and a biathlon course. Access can be made here by railway or by car (from Andermatt only).

=== Valtgeva ===
In Sedrun there are two small beginner runs, served by two T-bars and a magic carpet.

=== Winterhorn ===
In Hospental, there is a mountain called Winterhorn, which has been disused since 2007. The 2-man chairlift and the T-bar remain in place. The mountain was generally suited to intermediate skiers. It was accessible by either railway or car (from Andermatt only).

== Ski lifts ==
=== Operational ===
There are in total 19 operating ski lifts in the ski resort Andermatt-Sedrun.

| Mountain | Name | Type | Height of ground station(m) | Height of mountain station(m) | Construction year |
|---|---|---|---|---|---|
| Nätschen | Andermatt - Gütsch | 8-man gondola lift | 1444 | 2344 | 2017 |
| Nätschen | Unter Stafel - Gütsch | Detachable 6-man chairlift with bubble | 2160 | 2344 | 2016 |
| Nätschen | Hinter Bördli - Strahlgand | Detachable 6-man chairlift with bubble | 2135 | 2400 | 2017 |
| Nätschen | Vordere Felli - Schneehüenerstock | Detachable 6-man chairlift with bubble | 2165 | 2600 | 2017 |
| Nätschen | Oberalppass - Schneehüenerstock | 10-man gondola lift | 2044 | 2600 | 2018 |
| Sedrun / Oberalp | Oberalppass - Piz Calmut | Detachable 6-man chairlift with bubble | 2049 | 2350 | 2015 |
| Sedrun / Oberalp | Val Val - Calmut | 4-man chairlift | 1950 | 2350 | 1988 |
| Sedrun / Oberalp | Val Val - Coulm Val | 4-man chairlift | 1950 | 2184 | 1988 |
| Sedrun / Oberalp | Tegia Gronda | T-bar | 2020 | 2260 | 1969 |
| Sedrun / Oberalp | Mulinatsch - Cuolm Val | Detachable 6-man chairlift | 1658 | 2213 | 2006 |
| Sedrun / Oberalp | Planatsch - Milez | T-bar | 1754 | 1900 | 1973 |
| Sedrun / Oberalp | Dieni - Milez | Detachable 4-man chairlift | 1500 | 1881 | 1994 |
| Valtgeva | Valtgeva | T-bar | 1445 | 1450 | 1962 |
| Valtgeva | Strem | T-bar | 1622 | 1774 | 1966 |
| Gemsstock | Andermatt - Gurschen | Cable car | 1444 | 2212 | 1991 |
| Gemsstock | Gurschen - Gemsstock | Cable car | 2212 | 2955 | 1990 |
| Gemsstock | Gurschen - Gurschenalp | Detachable 6-man chairlift with bubble | 2015 | 2285 | 2015 |
| Gemsstock | Lutersee - Geissgrat | T-bar | 2025 | 2398 | 1975 |
| Realp | Realp | T-bar | 1550 | 1660 | 1962 |

=== Former ===
There are currently four disused, but still standing, ski lifts in the Andermatt-Sedrun Sport AG.

| Mountain | Name | Type | Height of ground station(m) | Height of mountain station(m) | Construction year | Status | Final year |
|---|---|---|---|---|---|---|---|
| Nätschen | Dürstelen | T-bar | 2010 | 2314 | 1981 | Disused | 2017 |
| Nätschen | Grossboden | T-bar | 2150 | 2364 | 1994 | Demolished | 2016 |
| Nätschen | Nätschen - Stöckli | Detachable 4-man chairlift | 1842 | 2314 | 1994 | Disused | 2017 |
| Nätschen | Andermatt - Nätschen | 2-man chairlift | 1451 | 1858 | 1983 | Demolished | 2017 |
| Sedrun / Oberalp | Oberalppass - Piz Calmut | T-bar | 2049 | 2350 | 1987 | Demolished | 2015 |
| Gemsstock | Gurschen - Gurschenalp | 2-man chairlift | 2015 | 2205 | 1982 | Demolished | 2015 |
| Gemsstock | Gurschenalp | T-bar | 2050 | 2285 | 1962 | Demolished | 2015 |
| Winterhorn | Hospental - Lückli | 2-man chairlift | 1512 | 1961 | 1981 | Disused | 2006 |
| Winterhorn | Lückli - Winterhorn | T-bar | 1937 | 2355 | 1981 | Disused | 2006 |

== Ski schools ==
The Andermatt-Sedrun Sport AG has four schools; one for the Sedrun skiing area, and three for the Andermatt ski areas. Each have several different classes, based on age and ability.

== Future ==
Plans are underway to replace the majority of the current ski lifts in Andermatt, along with new lifts and routes. The plans are for

- A new detachable 4-man chairlift replacing the current T-bar Lutersee - Geissgrat
- A new cable car providing access from Göschenen
- A new 8-man gondola lift replacing the current Cable car Andermatt - Gurschen

== See also ==
- Gemsstock
- Nätschen
- Sedrun
- Andermatt
- Oberalp
- Realp
- Hospental
