= Piz Nair (Glarus Alps) =

Mountain in Switzerland

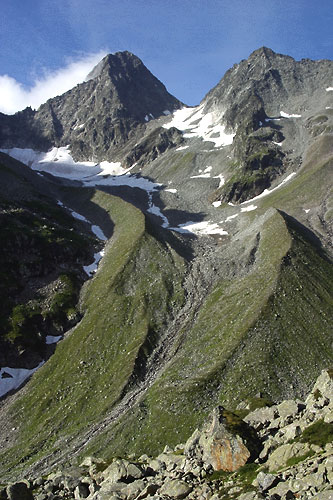
- Piz Nair (left) and Hälsistock (right) from the Etzli valley

Highest point
- Elevation: 3,059 m (10,036 ft)
- Prominence: 229 m (751 ft)
- Parent peak: Piz Giuv
- Coordinates: 46°41′57.2″N 8°42′32.8″E

Geography
- Location within Switzerland
- Location: Graubünden/Uri, Switzerland
- Parent range: Glarus Alps

Piz Nair (3,059 m) is a mountain of the Glarus Alps, located on the border between the Swiss cantons of Uri and Graubünden. Together with Piz Giuv (3,096 m) on the west, it overlooks the end of the Etzli valley in the canton of Uri. The south-west and the south-east sides overlook respectively the small valleys of Val Giuv and Val Milà, both converging to the Rhine valley west of Sedrun (Graubünden). The mountain is politically divided between the municipalities of Silenen (Uri) and Tujetsch (Graubünden).

On the northern side of Piz Nair lies a small glacier, the Fellelifirn. Large lateral moraines can be seen below the glacier.
