= Bristen =

Mountain in Switzerland

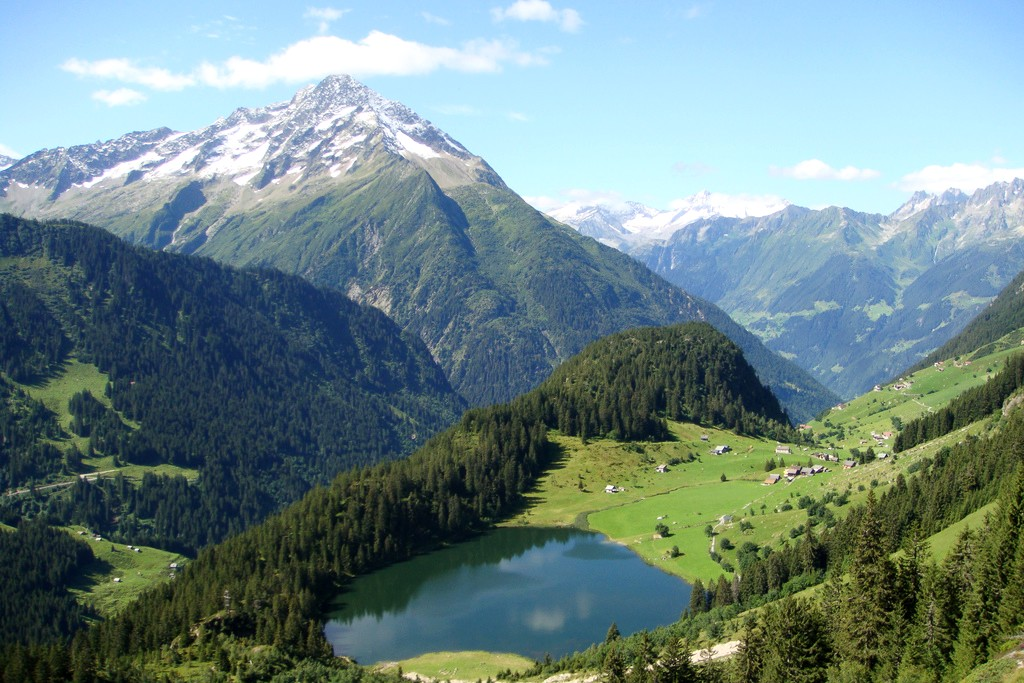
- View from Golzern

Highest point
- Elevation: 3,073 m (10,082 ft)
- Prominence: 567 m (1,860 ft)
- Parent peak: Piz Giuv
- Listing: Alpine mountains above 3000 m
- Coordinates: 46°44′14.3″N 08°40′53.6″E

Geography
- Location within Switzerland Location within Canton of Uri
- Country: Switzerland
- Canton: Uri
- Parent range: Glarus Alps

The Bristen (3,073 m [10,082 ft]) is a mountain in the Glarus Alps, overlooking the valley of the Reuss and located to the south of Amsteg in the canton of Uri, Switzerland. The mountain is located about 4 kilometres (2.5 mi) north of Piz Giuv and the border with the canton of Grisons (Graubünden). The Bristen is considered one of the main landmarks of the canton of Uri.

== Geographic setting and description ==
The Bristen is located about 3 kilometres (1.9 mi) to the south of the village also called Bristen in the Maderanertal and about four kilometers north of Piz Giuv, with the Portlilücke (2,506 m [8,222 ft]) in between.

An arête on the north side of the mountain is divided after 200 metres (660 ft) into the northern arête and the northeastern arête. Located below the northern arête on 2,095 metres (6,873 ft) is the Bristensee – two hectares wide and 6.5 metres (21 ft) deep. On the western side of the mountain a steep arête leads down to the Fellital, the southern side is marked by another arête leading to the Zwächten (2,853 m [9,360 ft]), which goes further to the Portlilücke. To the east of the Bristen lies the Etzlihütte at 2,052 metres (6,732 ft) above sea level.

== Geology ==
Geologically the Bristen belongs to the aarmassif. The southern part of the mountain consists of several different types of rocks, among them rhyolite and amphibolite. Further to the south the typical aare-granite can be found. For amateur geology the region around the Bristen is interesting, as it is famous for its many different types of minerals and quartz.

== See also ==
- List of mountains of Uri
