= Gemsstock =

Mountain in Switzerland

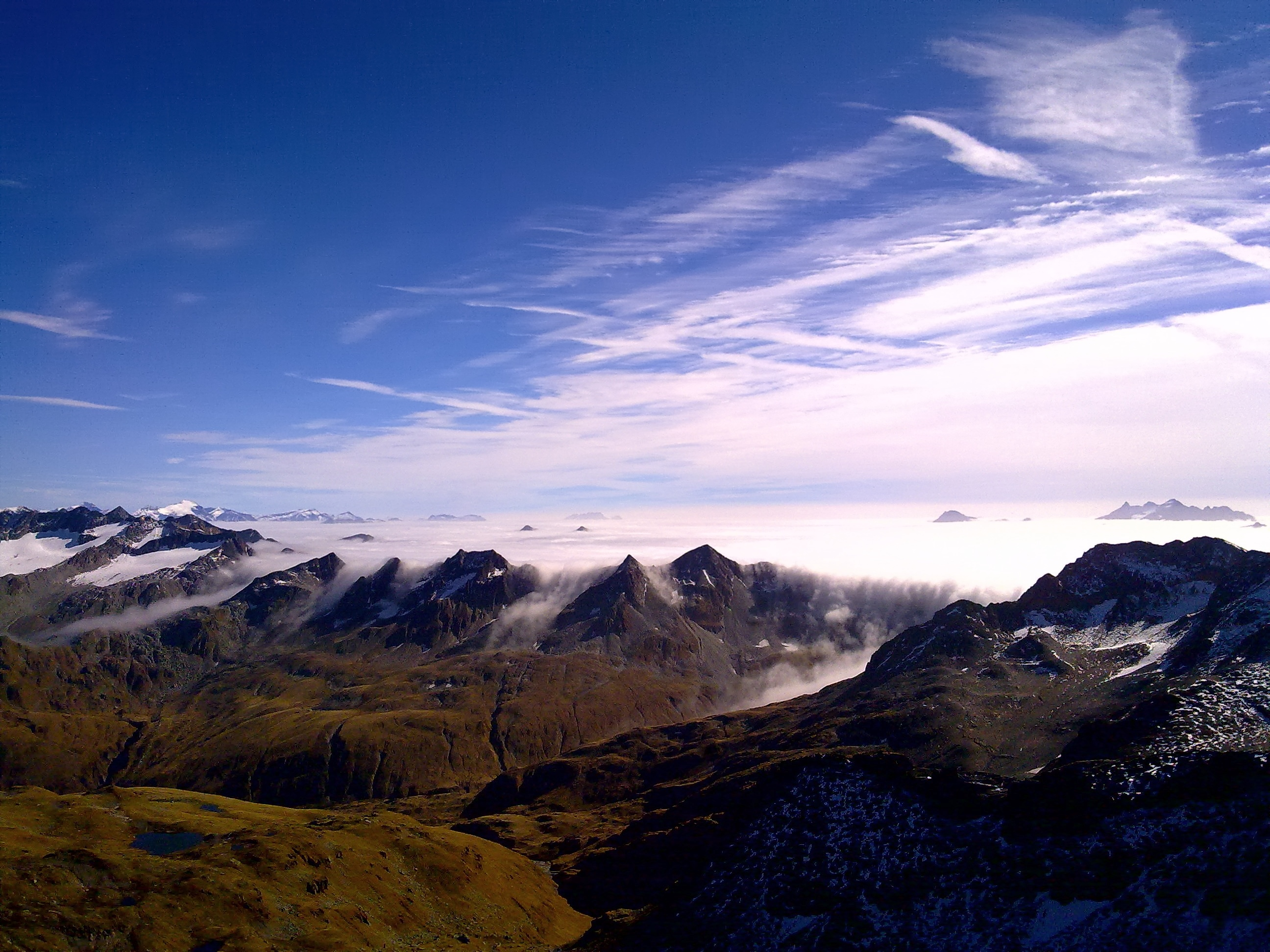
- View from the summit towards Ticino

Highest point
- Elevation: 2,962 m (9,718 ft)
- Prominence: 86 m (282 ft)
- Parent peak: Chastelhorn
- Coordinates: 46°36′8.2″N 8°36′42.1″E

Geography
- Location within Switzerland
- Location: Uri, Switzerland
- Parent range: Lepontine Alps

Climbing
- Easiest route: Aerial tramway

Gemsstock is a mountain of the Swiss Lepontine Alps, overlooking Andermatt in the canton of Uri. A glacier named Gurschenfirn lies over its northern flanks. The Gemsstock is a subpeak of the higher Chastelhorn, lying approximately one kilometre south-west.

== Ski Area ==
Gemsstock is part of the Gotthard Oberalp Arena, as is Naetschen, which sits on the other side of Andermatt.

There are two 'skiing sections' on Gemsstock. There is a cable car in Andermatt which goes directly up to the middle of the mountain. On the middle level, known as Gurschenalp, there are:

- 3x ski lifts
  - 1x 2-man chairlift
  - 2x T-bars
- 1x 'fun park' (no half pipes)
- 3x ski runs
  - 2x blue (beginner) runs
  - 1x red (intermediate) run

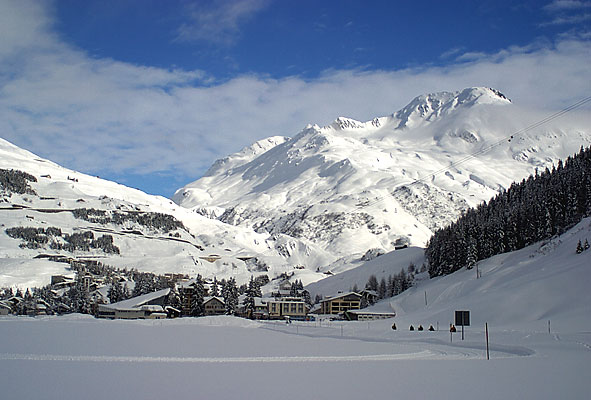
The Andermatt - Gurschen cable car line leaving Andermatt.

Up on the top of Gemsstock there is:

- a completely off-piste and untracked run that runs around the back of Gemsstock, called The Guspis.
- a black run called The B.Russi Run (named after Andermatt's Bernhard Russi).
- a red run called Sun Track.

Gemsstock is a north peak, so you can ski on it until May. Before February it's very cold on Gemsstock because the sun can't shine on the peak.

=== Future ===
In the future, Orascom Hotels and Development plan to build 5 new ski lifts, along with several new runs, as part of their Andermatt expansion project.

These plans did include a cable car from Hospental. However, the Swiss Alpine Club stated that they did not "see the need" for a cable car running from Hospental, as there is already one running from Andermatt. It was later shown that this lift was not going to be constructed.

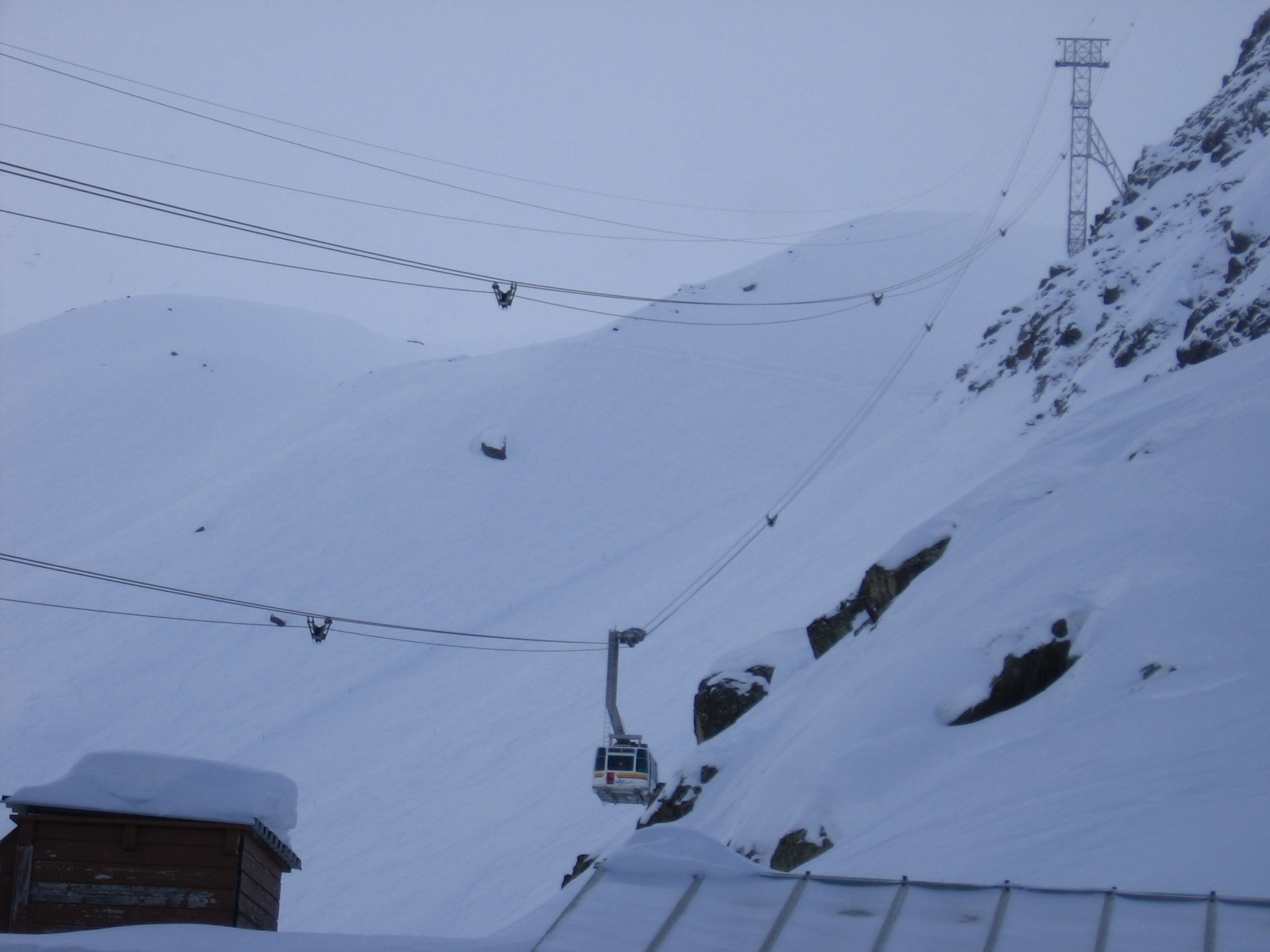
The Gurschen - Gemsstock cable car, leaving the bottom terminal.

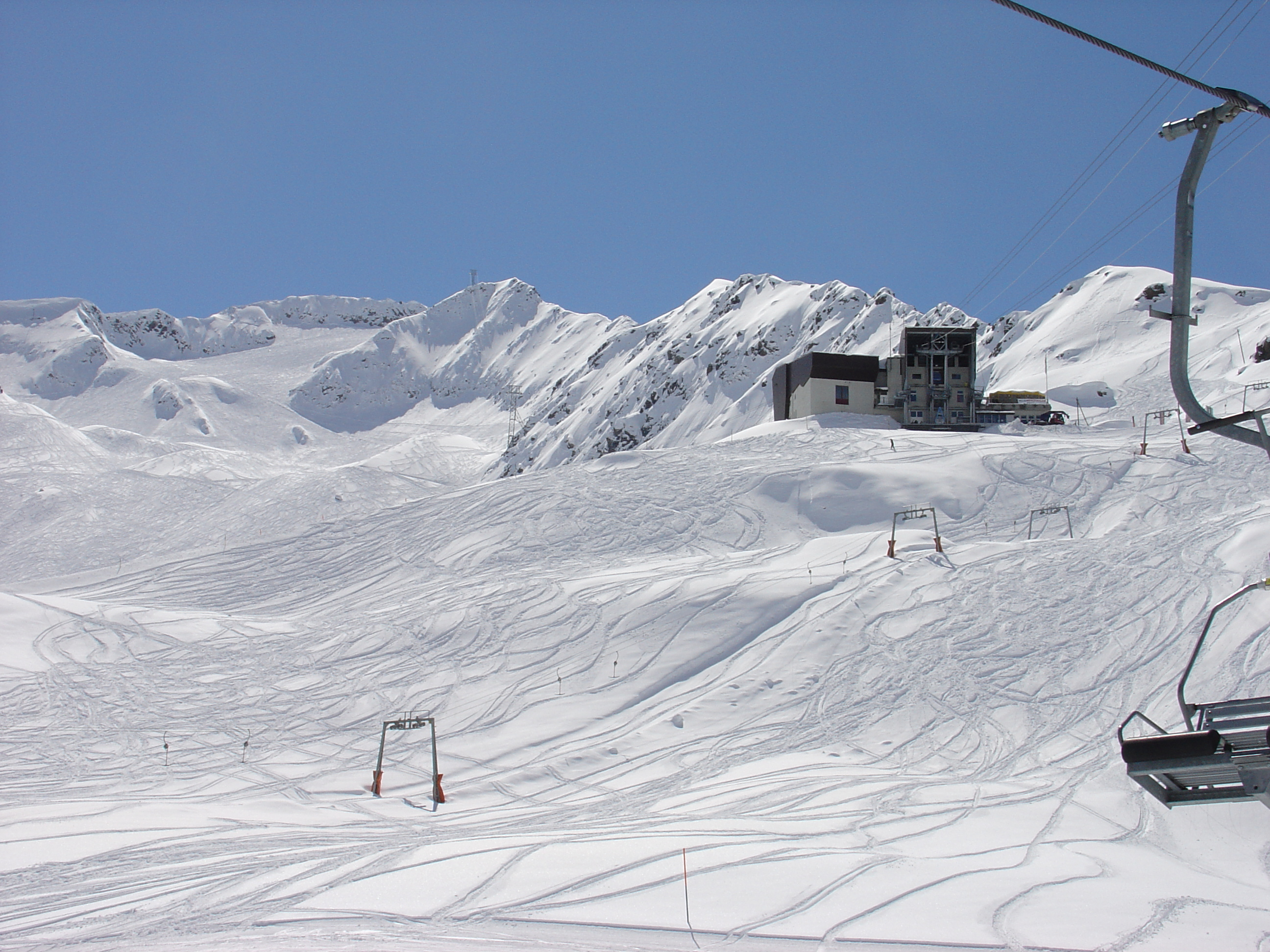
The Gemsstock Glacier is seen on the left, and the middle cable car station on the right.

Another idea was a cable car or gondola from Nätschen or Gütsch to Gurschenalp (similar to the Peak 2 Peak Gondola in Canada). This cable car would travel over the valley, and over Andermatt. This, however, was not included in the project's official ski area master plan. This idea would have been very costly to construct, maintain, and run, and may have been unpopular with the residents of Andermatt, due to the fact that it would block the view of the sky above.

=== Ski Lifts ===
Gemsstock has 5 ski lifts, all made by Garaventa.

Name	Type	Height of ground station(m)	Height of mountain station(m)	Construction year
Andermatt - Gurschen	Cable car	1444	2212	1991
Gurschen - Gemsstock	Cable car	2212	2955	1990
Gurschen	2-man chairlift	2015	2205	1982
Gurschenalp	T-bar	2050	2285	1962
Lutersee	T-bar	2025	2398	1975

== See also ==
- List of mountains of Switzerland accessible by public transport
