= Chastelhorn =

Mountain in Switzerland

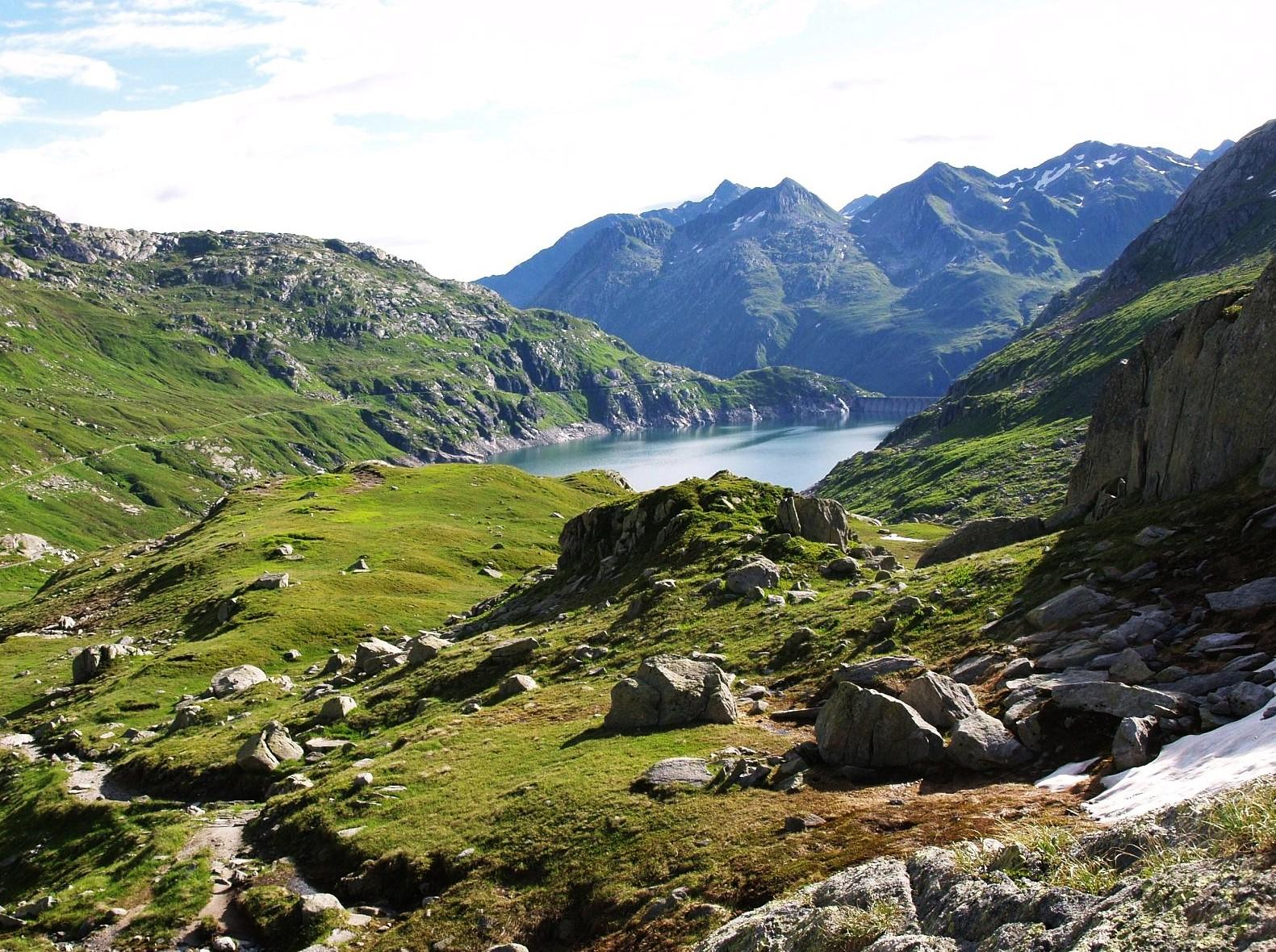
- The Chastelhorn (background) from Lago di Lucendro

Highest point
- Elevation: 2,973 m (9,754 ft)
- Prominence: 246 m (807 ft)
- Parent peak: Pizzo Centrale
- Coordinates: 46°35′42″N 8°35′52.8″E

Geography
- Location within Switzerland
- Location: Uri, Switzerland
- Parent range: Lepontine Alps

The Chastelhorn is a 2,973 metres high mountain in the Lepontine Alps, overlooking Hospental in the canton of Uri. The northern flanks are covered by a glacier named St. Annafirn and a small lake (2,624 metres) lies south of the summit.

The massif of the Chastelhorn consists of several summits including the Gemsstock (2,961 metres) which is connected to Andermatt by a cable car.
