= Bristensee =

Lake in Uri, Switzerland

- Location within Canton of Uri Location within Switzerland Location within Alps
- Interactive map of Bristensee
- Location: Uri
- Coordinates: 46°45′03″N 8°41′24″E
- Basin countries: Switzerland
- Surface area: 2 ha (4.9 acres)
- Max. depth: 6.5 m (21 ft)
- Surface elevation: 2,095 m (6,873 ft)

Bristensee is a lake in the Canton of Uri, Switzerland. It is located below the mountain Bristen and above the village of Bristen.

There is a lodge for tourists and campers located directly opposite the lake.
