= Oberalp Pass =

High mountain pass in the Swiss Alps

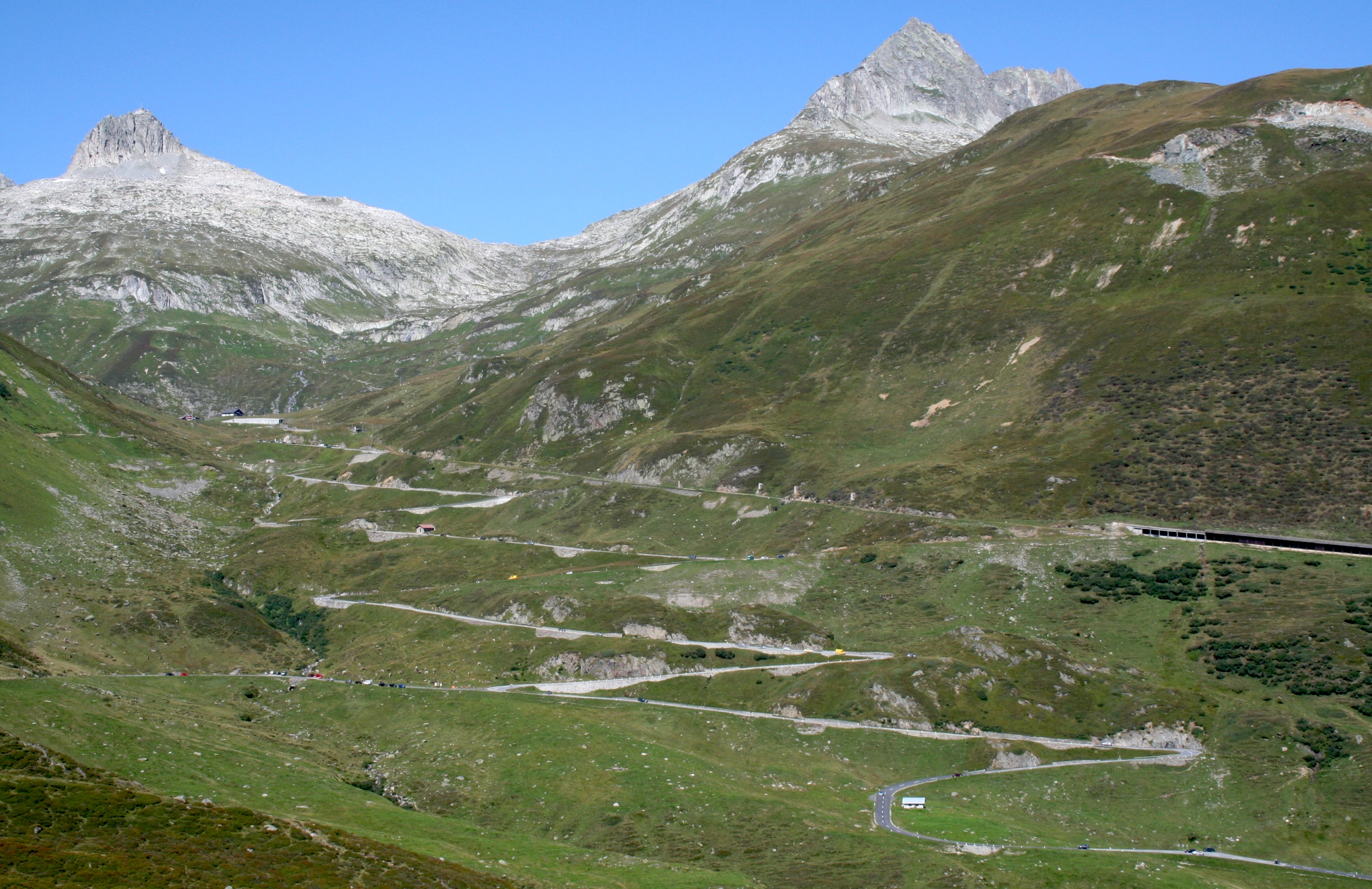

- Location within Switzerland
- Elevation: 2,044 metres (6,706 ft)
- Traversed by: Road and rail tunnel (2,033 m)

Third Approach
- Location: Graubünden/Uri, Switzerland
- Range: Alps
- Coordinates: 46°39.54′N 08°40.26′E

Oberalp Pass (Romansh: Alpsu or Cuolm d'Ursera; German: Oberalppass) (2044 meters above sea level) is a high mountain pass in the Swiss Alps connecting the cantons of Graubünden and Uri between Disentis/Mustér and Andermatt.

== Winter closure ==
The public road that crosses the pass is closed in winter, but the Furka-Oberalp railway line, now part of the Matterhorn Gotthard Bahn, runs year round and provides a limited shuttle for cars in winter (reservation required). When the road closes depends on snowfall and varies between the end of October and the beginning of December. The road opens again in spring, usually by the end of April but sometimes not until mid May.

In winter, a ski area extends to the Graubünden side, connecting the pass well into the Tujetsch territory to Dieni, near Rueras.

== Source of the Rhine ==
The major European river Rhine springs from a source nearby (Lai da Tuma), which can be accessed by hiking two hours from Oberalp Pass. A multiday trekking route is signposted across Oberalp pass and along the young Rhine called Senda Sursilvana.

Oberalpsee is located 20 m below, in the direction of Andermatt.

== Railway station ==
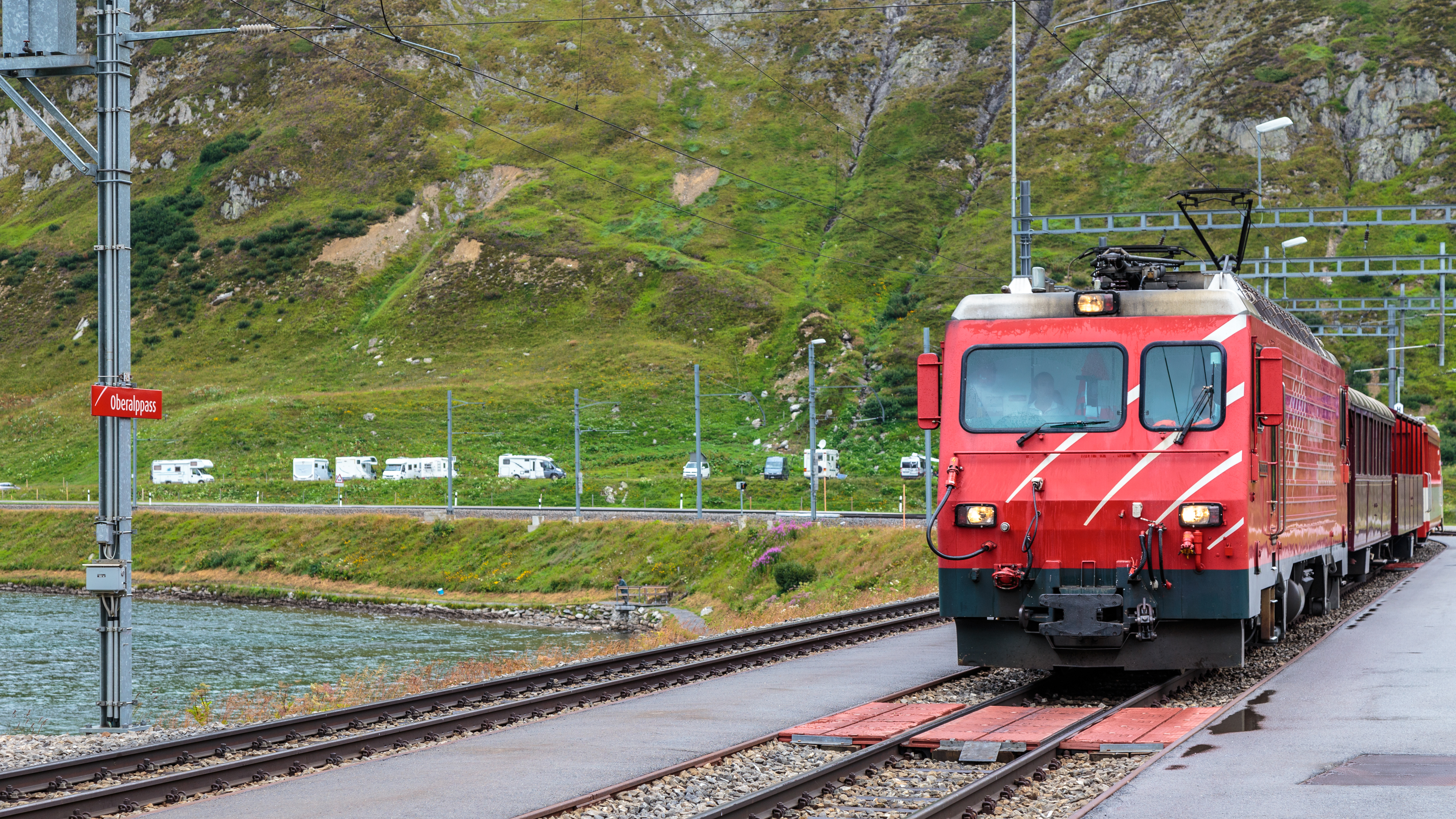
...arriving Oberalppass station

A railway station is located next to the Oberalppass road. It is at the base of the Oberalp ski area. The station is owned and run by the Matterhorn Gotthard Bahn. It has 3 platforms, one of which is a bay platform from Andermatt, and is often closed during the winter. The railway on both sides of the station is a single line, so Oberalppass is an important passing place. The station is the highest point on the Matterhorn Gotthard Bahn network.

== Ski Area ==
The Oberalp Pass passes the Oberalp ski area, which is part of the Gotthard Oberalp Arena.

There are currently plans for the ski area to be linked up with Nätschen, the neighbouring mountain, which is also part of the Gotthard Oberalp Arena.

== Gallery ==
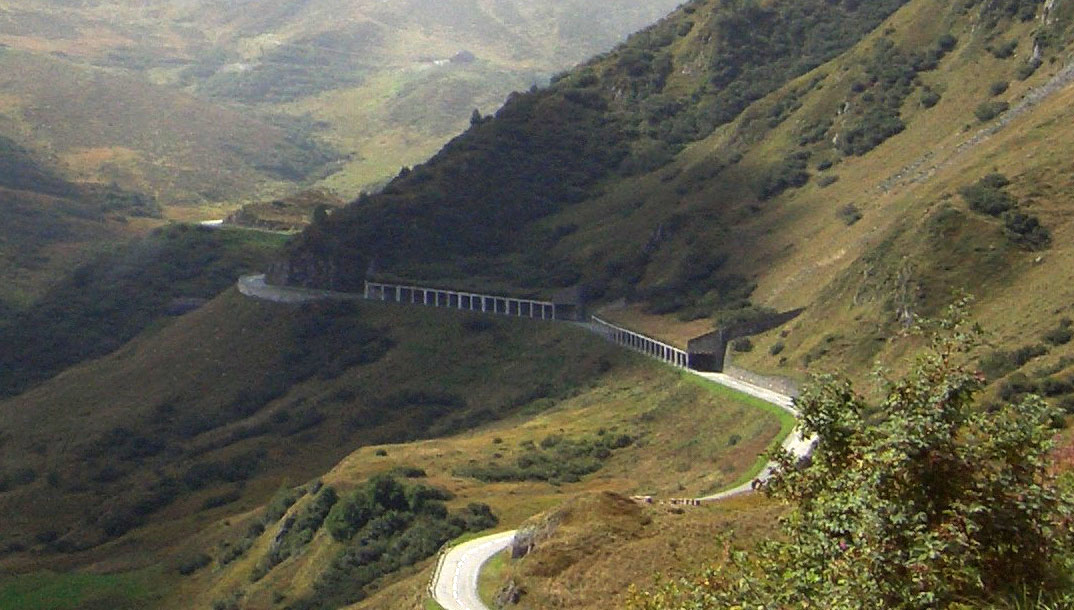
Oberalp Pass

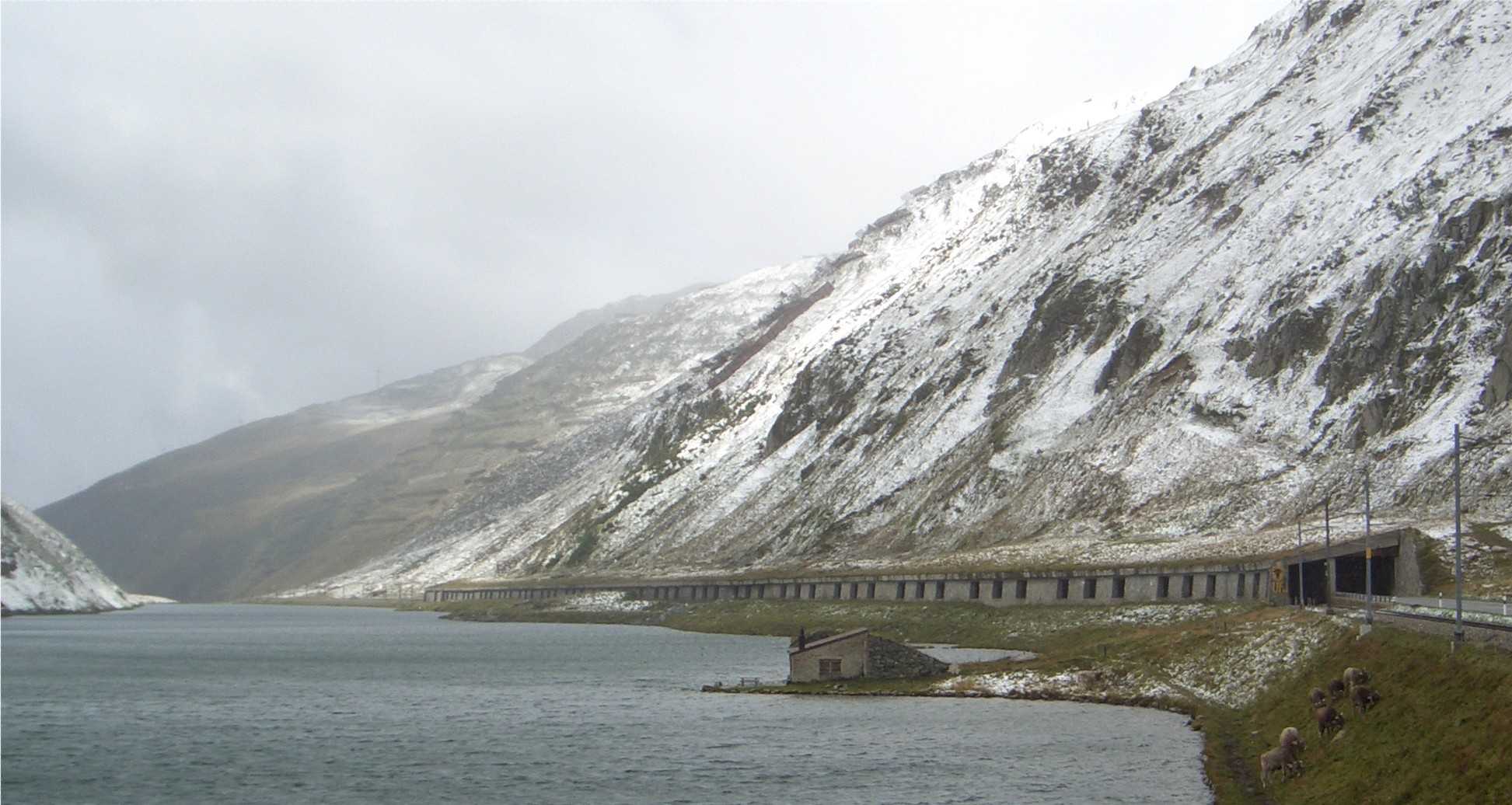
Oberalpsee and railway/road protection tunnel

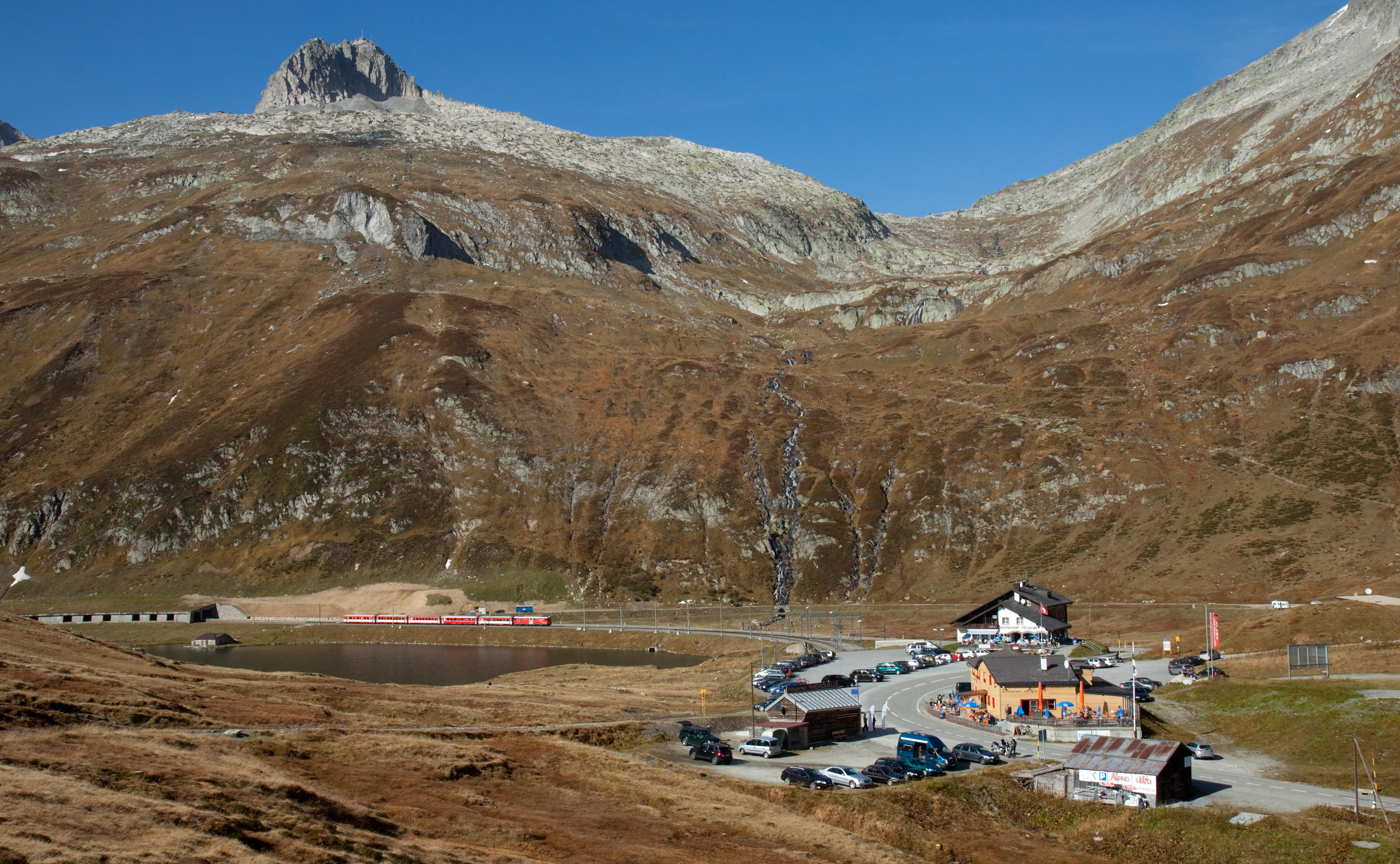
Summit of the road (railway uses short tunnel)

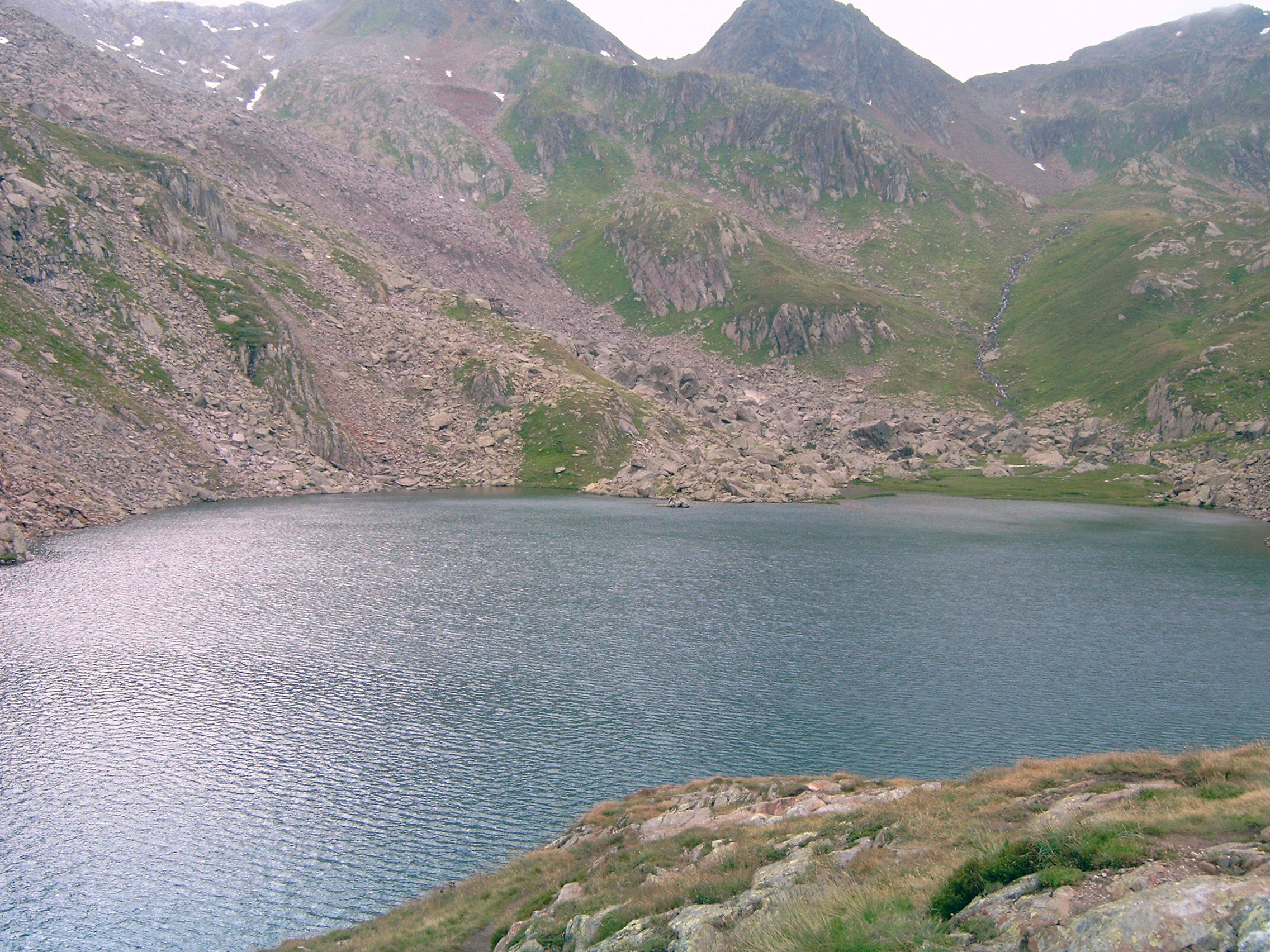
Tomasee

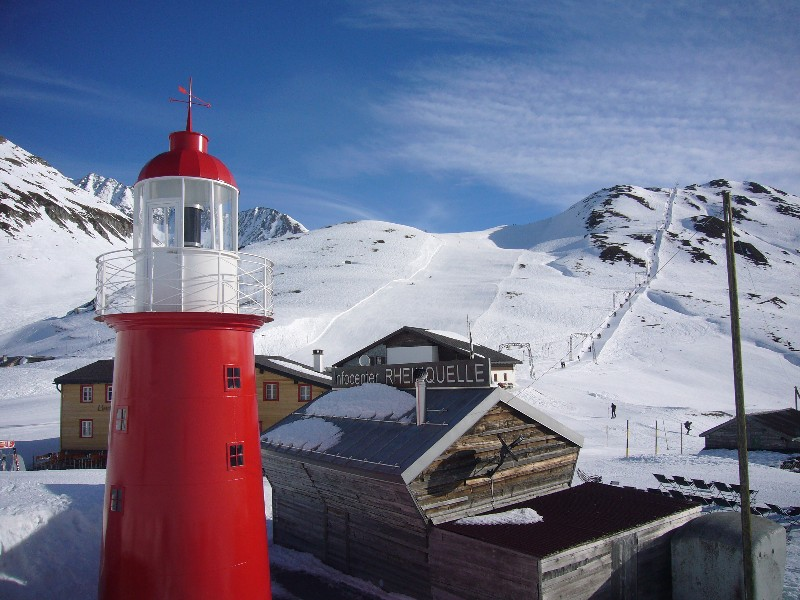
Oberalp in the winter

== See also ==
- List of highest paved roads in Europe
- List of mountain passes
- List of the highest Swiss passes
- Gotthard Oberalp Arena
