= Piz Giuv =

Mountain in Switzerland

- Schattig Wichel
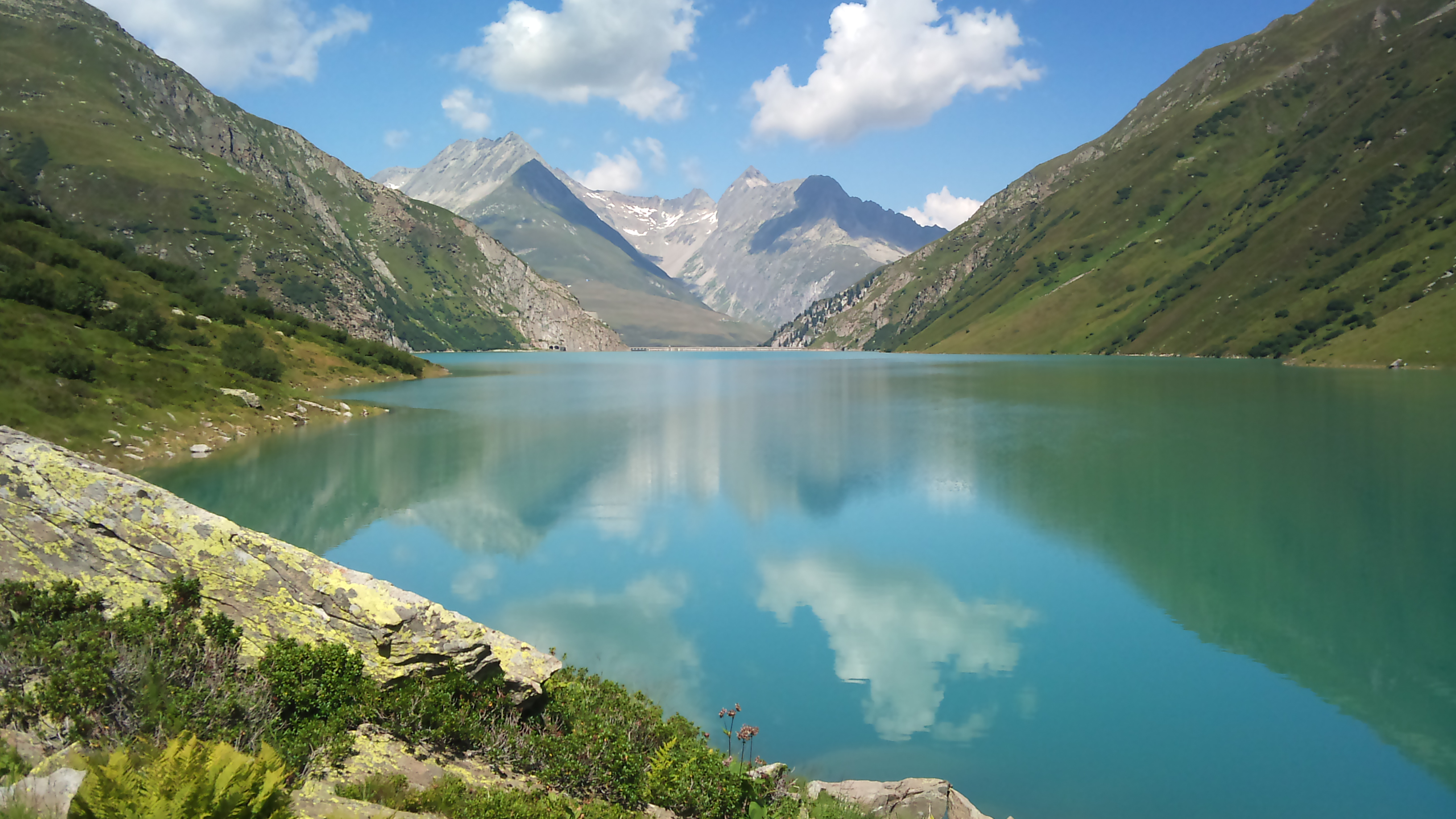
- View from Lake Curnera, Piz Giuv lies behind the lower summit of the Crispalt (centre left)

Highest point
- Elevation: 3,096 m (10,157 ft)
- Prominence: 749 m (2,457 ft)
- Parent peak: Tödi
- Listing: Alpine mountains above 3000 m
- Coordinates: 46°42′07″N 8°41′33″E

Geography
- Location within Switzerland
- Location: Uri/Graubünden, Switzerland
- Parent range: Glarus Alps

Piz Giuv (or Schattig Wichel) is a mountain of the Glarus Alps, located on the border between the cantons of Uri and Graubünden. At 3,096 metres above sea level, it is the highest mountain of the Glarus Alps lying west of the Oberalpstock. Its summit is situated between three valleys: the Fellital and Etzlital on the north side and the Val Giuv (Surselva) on the south side. The slightly lower Piz Nair lies on its east side
