= Oberalpsee =

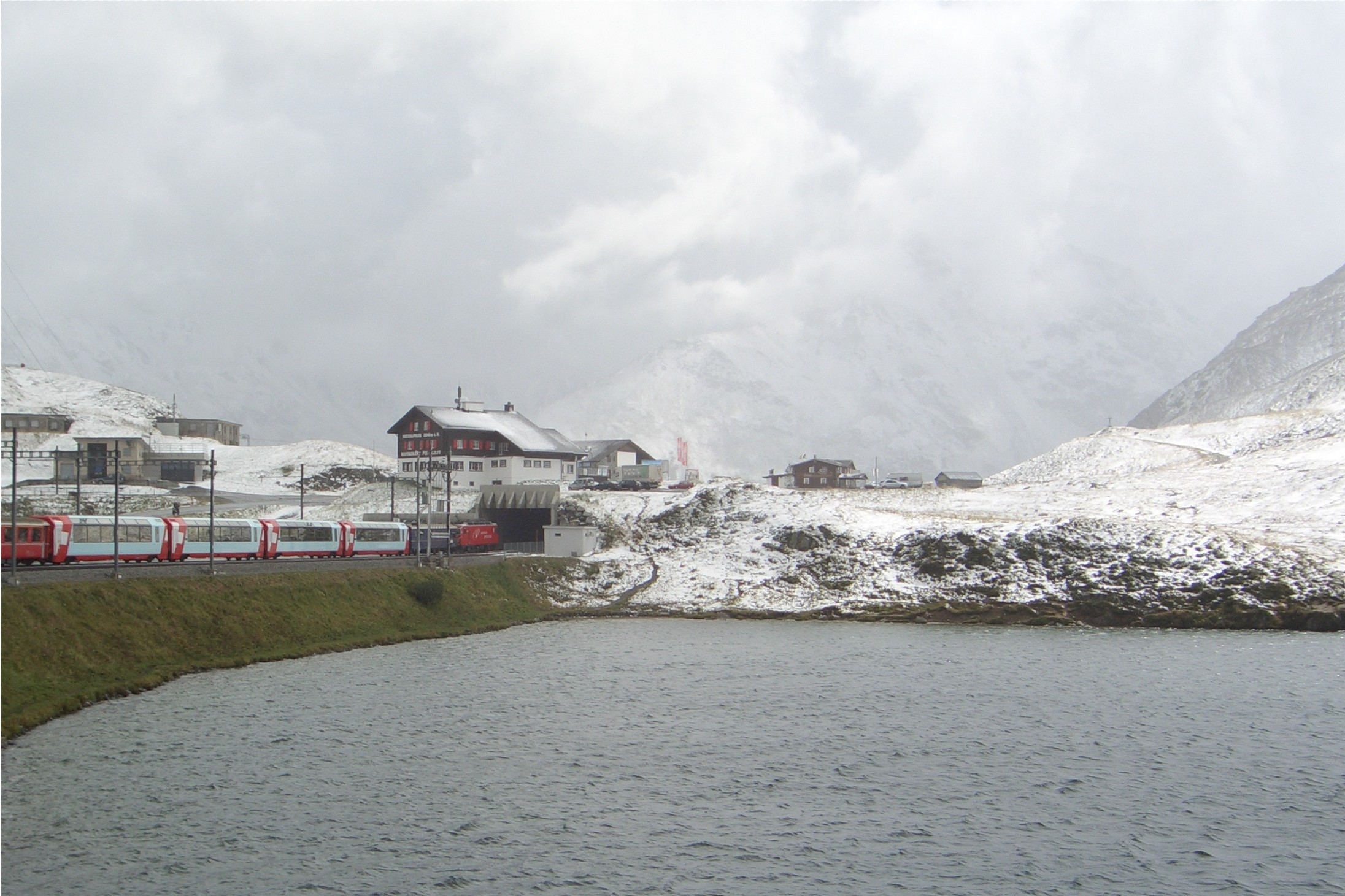
- With Oberalp Pass and Glacier Express

- Location within Canton of Uri Location within Canton of Graubünden Location within Switzerland Location within Alps
- Interactive map of Oberalpsee
- Location: Oberalp Pass, Uri
- Coordinates: 46°39′38″N 8°39′51″E
- Type: natural lake
- Basin countries: Switzerland
- Surface area: 18 ha (44 acres)
- Surface elevation: 2,026 m (6,647 ft)

Oberalpsee is a reservoir just below Oberalp Pass on the side of the Canton of Uri in Switzerland.

== See also ==
- List of mountain lakes of Switzerland
