= Tujetsch =

- Municipality
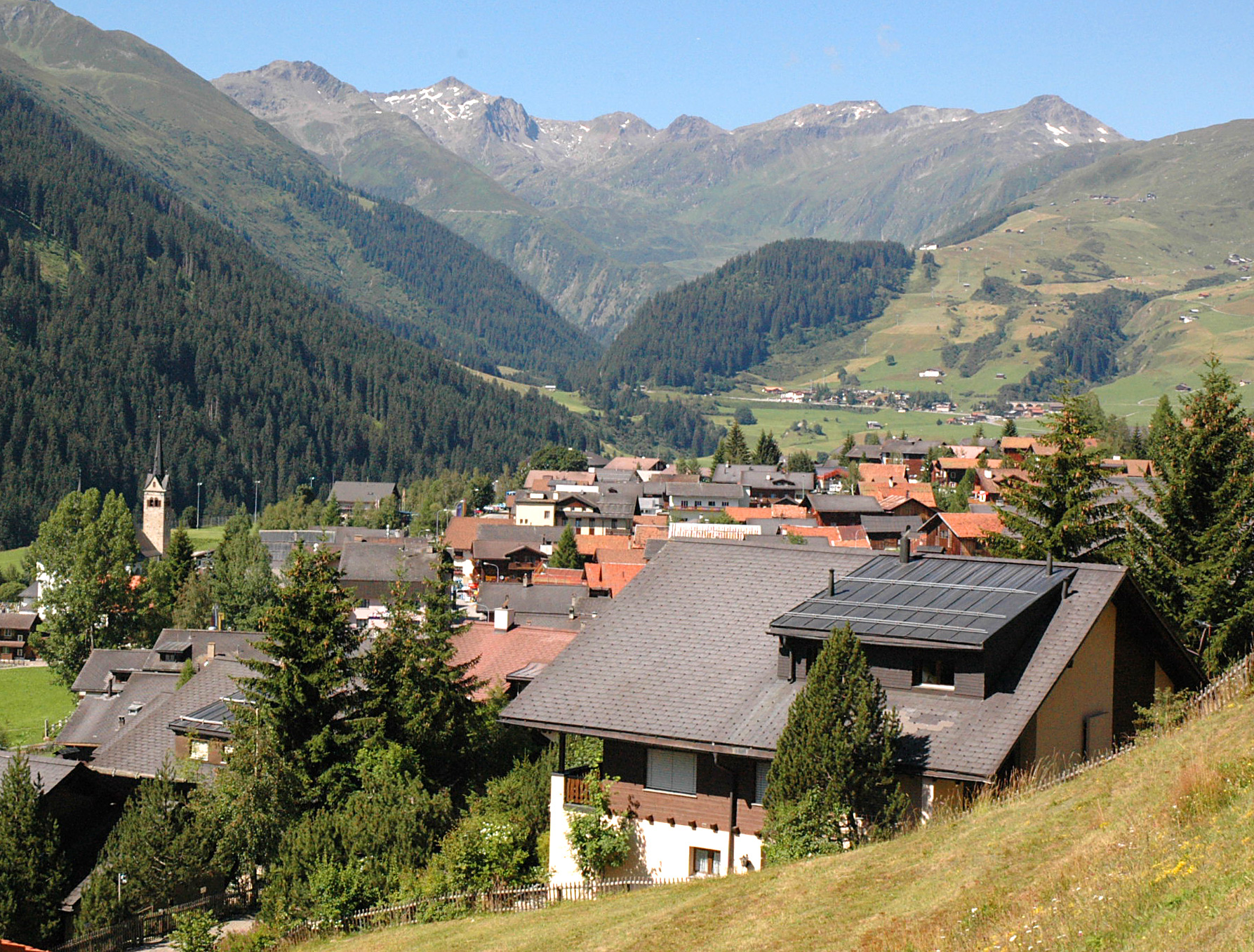
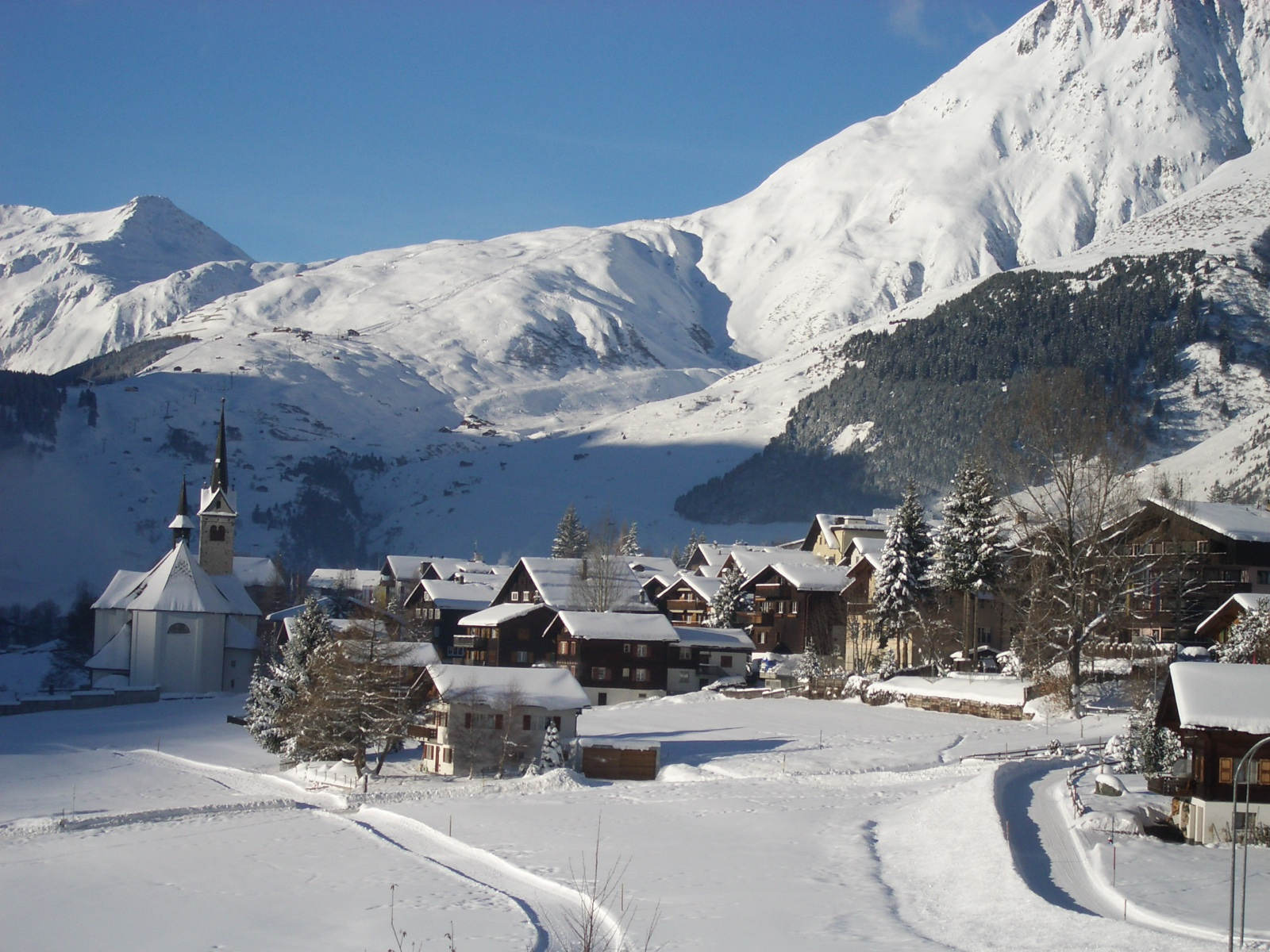
- Sedrun village Sedrun village

- Flag Coat of arms
- Location of Tujetsch
- Location within Switzerland Location within Canton of Grisons
- Coordinates: 46°41′N 8°46′E
- Country: Switzerland
- Canton: Grisons
- District: Surselva

Area
  - Total: 134 km^{2} (52 sq mi)
- Elevation: 1,450 m (4,760 ft)
- Highest elevation (Péz Tgietschen): 3,327 m (10,915 ft)
- Lowest elevation (Nislas): 1,230 m (4,040 ft)

Population (December 2020)
  - Total: 1,183
  - Density: 8.83/km^{2} (22.9/sq mi)
- Time zone: UTC+01:00 (CET)
  - Summer (DST): UTC+02:00 (CEST)
- Postal code: 7188
- SFOS number: 3986
- ISO 3166 code: CH-GR
- Localities: Tschamut, Selva, Dieni, Rueras, Zarcuns, Camischolas, Gonda, Sedrun, Bugnei, Surrein, Cavorgia
- Surrounded by: Airolo (TI), Andermatt (UR), Disentis/Mustér, Gurtnellen (UR), Medel (Lucmagn), Quinto (TI), Silenen (UR)
- Website: www.tujetsch.ch

Tujetsch (Romansh pronunciation: [ˈtujətʃ]; German: Tavetsch) is a municipality in the Surselva Region in the canton of the Grisons in Switzerland. It is the westernmost municipality of the canton, connected to Urseren (canton of Uri) by the Oberalp Pass.

== History ==
Aerial view from 2000 m by Walter Mittelholzer (1923)

The upper Surselva was first settled in the 9th century, following the foundation of Disentis Abbey, as part of the Cadi (feudal possessions of the abbey). In the 12th century, the Walser migrated across Oberalp Pass. Sedrun parish church was first consecrated in 1205. Both Romansh and Walser communities lived exclusively in dispersed settlements well into the early modern period. The Walser were mostly Romanized, but some Alemannic toponymy remains on the left bank of the Rhine. In the 18th century, villages formed in the vicinity of parish churches, and most of the 66 scattered settlements recorded in the 16th century were abandoned. Sedrun became the main settlement and municipal capital. The economic focus shifted from alpine agriculture to the production of soapstone stoves and pottery. Population fell to below 900 people in the second half of the 19th century due to emigration. The development of the tourism industry in the first half of the 20th century resulted in moderate population growth, to 1,122 as of 1950. Ski tourism and hydroelectricity were developed in the 1950s to 1960s.

Tujetsch was never the name of a village. As the name of the valley, Thiuesch is first recorded in 1237. The local variety of the Romansh language is markedly different from standard Sursilvan and is sometimes listed as a separate dialect, Tuatschin. The Tavetsch breed of sheep closely resembled Neolithic era livestock. The breed became extinct in 1954, and a breeding back project was initiated in 1984. The official name of the municipality was Tavetsch until 1976.

== Geography ==
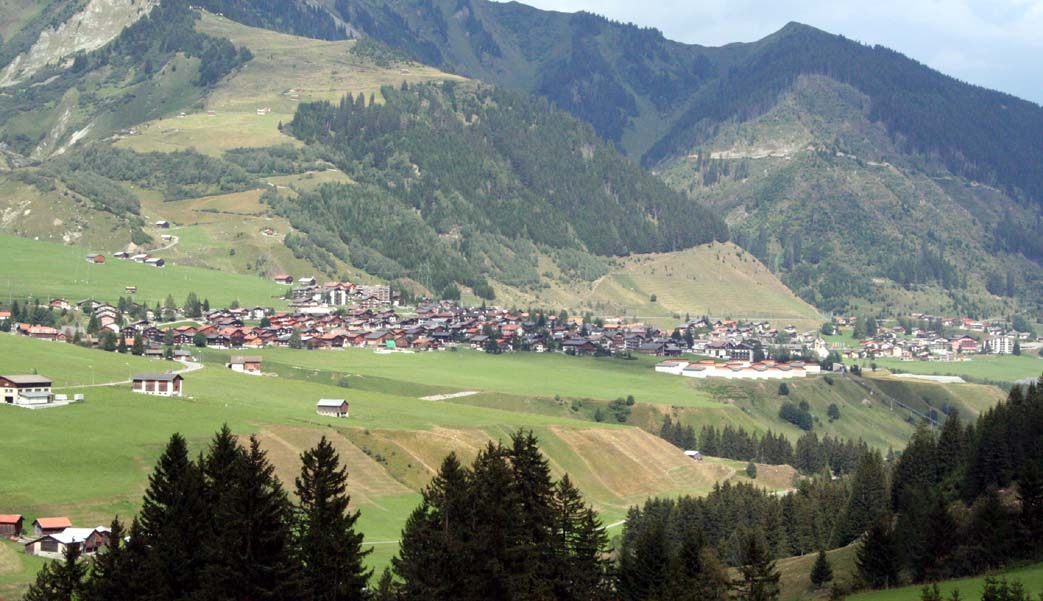
Sedrun village, part of Tujetsch.

Tujetsch has an area, as of 2006, of 133.9 km^{2} (51.7 sq mi). Of this area, 25.7% is used for agricultural purposes, while 10.8% is forested. 1.4% is settled (buildings or roads) while the remainder (62%) is non-productive (rivers, glaciers or mountains).

Before 2017, the municipality was located in the Disentis sub-district of the Surselva district; since 2017 it has been part of the Surselva Region. It is located at the entrance to the Oberalp Pass and at the source of the Vorderrhein river. It consists of the village of Sedrun and the sections of Tschamut, Selva, Rueras/Dieni, Camischolas/Zarcuns, Gonda and Bugnei on the left bank of the Vorderrhein, and the settlements of Surrein and Cavorgia on the right bank. Until 1920 there was no direct route between the village halves on each bank of the Vorderrhein. Until 1976 Tujetsch was known as Tavetsch.

== Demographics ==
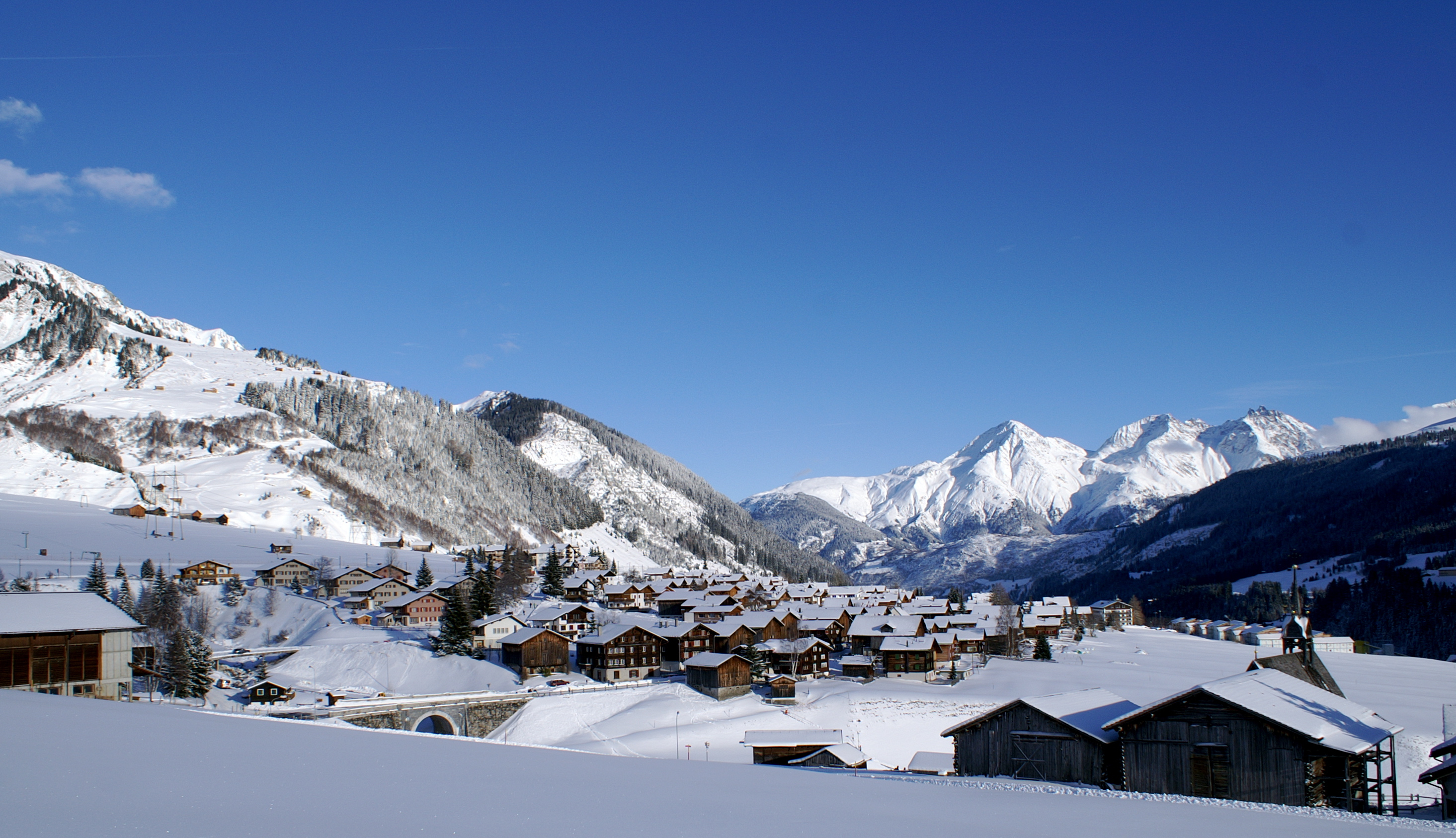
The localities of Camischolas (rear) and Zarcuns (front) in the municipality of Tujetsch

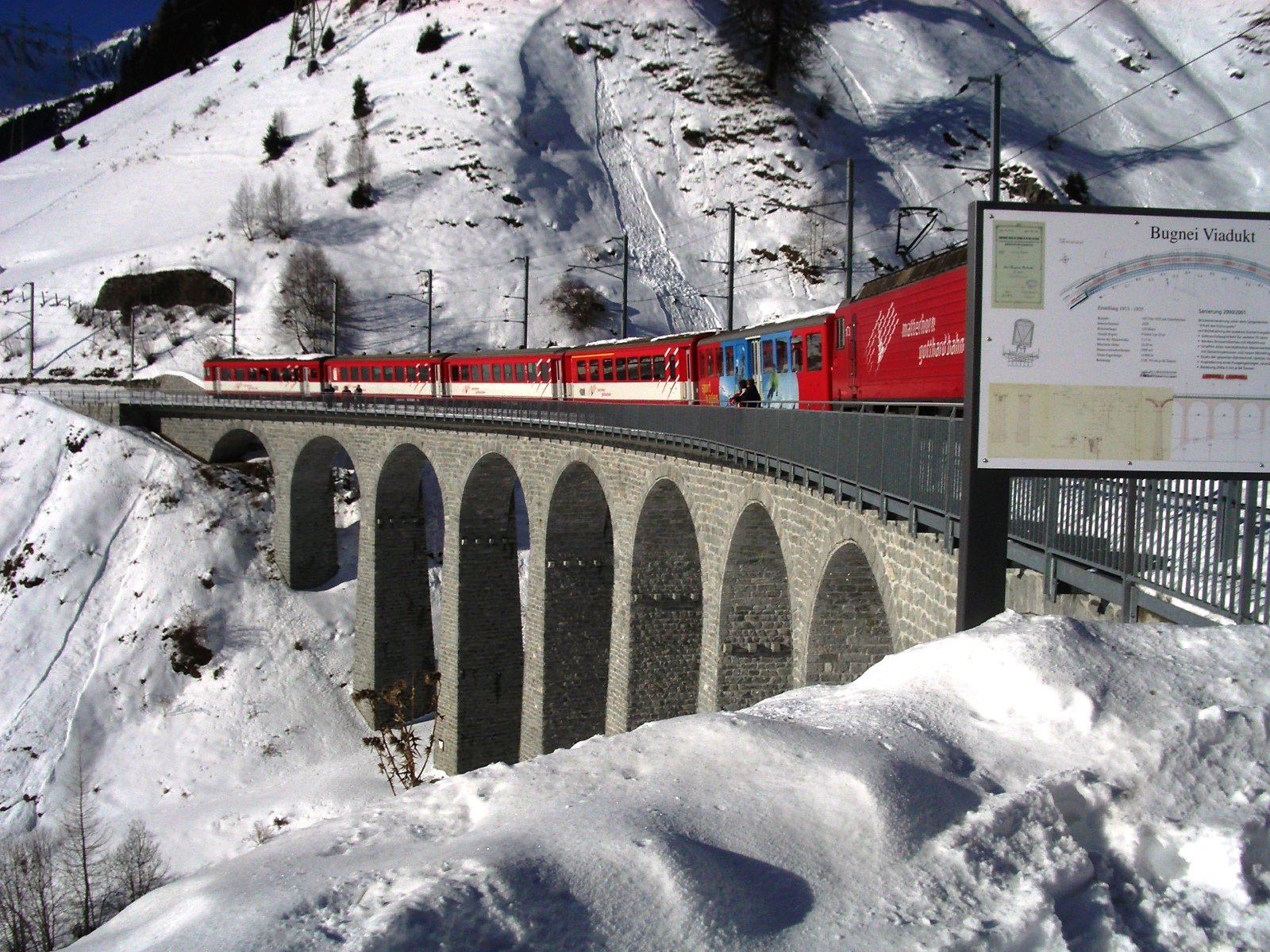
Bugnei rail bridge near Sedrun

Tujetsch has a population (as of 31 December 2020) of 1,183. As of 2008, 29.1% of the population was made up of foreign nationals. Over the last 10 years the population has grown at a rate of 25.1%. Most of the population (as of 2000) speaks Romansh (66.2%), with German being second most common (19.7%) and Italian being third (2.6%).

As of 2000, the gender distribution of the population was 60.2% male and 39.8% female. The age distribution, as of 2000, in Tujetsch was as follows: 141 children or 9.2% of the population were between 0 and 9 years old and 181 teenagers or 11.9% were between 10 and 19. Of the adult population, 189 people or 12.4% of the population were between 20 and 29 years old. 251 people or 16.5% were between 30 and 39, 243 people or 15.9% were between 40 and 49, and 209 people or 13.7% were between 50 and 59. Of the senior population, 149 people or 9.8% of the population were between 60 and 69 years old, 108 people or 7.1% were between 70 and 79, 45 people or 3.0% were between 80 and 89, 8 people or 0.5% were between 90 and 99, and 1 person was 100 or more.

In the 2007 federal election the most popular party was the CVP which received 55.5% of the vote. The next three most popular parties were the SVP (27%), the SP (11.6%) and the FDP (4.6%).

In Tujetsch about 59.9% of the population (between age 25–64) have completed either non-mandatory upper secondary education or additional higher education (either university or a Fachhochschule).

Tujetsch has an unemployment rate of 1.57%. As of 2005, there were 56 people employed in the primary economic sector and about 26 businesses involved in this sector. 177 people were employed in the secondary sector and there were 19 businesses in this sector. 389 people were employed in the tertiary sector, with 66 businesses in this sector.

From the 2000 census, 1,222 or 80.1% were Roman Catholic, while 142 or 9.3% belonged to the Swiss Reformed Church. Of the rest of the population, there were 23 individuals (or about 1.51% of the population) who belonged to the Orthodox Church, and there were 6 individuals (or about 0.39% of the population) who belonged to another Christian church. There were 63 (or about 4.13% of the population) who were Muslims. There were 5 individuals (or about 0.33% of the population) who belonged to another church (not listed on the census), 31 (or about 2.03% of the population) belonged to no church, were agnostic or atheist, and 33 individuals (or about 2.16% of the population) did not answer the question.

The historical population is given in the following table:

year	population
1850	979
1900	810
1950	1,122
1960	1,855^{a}
2000	1,525

^a Population increase during construction of a power plant.

== Climate ==
The climate borders between humid continental (Köppen Dfb) and oceanic or temperate highland (Köppen Cfb), with cool summers, slightly cold winters and year- round precipitation.

Climate data for Disentis/Sedrun (1981–2010)
Month	Jan	Feb	Mar	Apr	May	Jun	Jul	Aug	Sep	Oct	Nov	Dec	Year
Mean daily maximum °C (°F)	2.3 (36.1)	3.1 (37.6)	6.8 (44.2)	10.4 (50.7)	15.3 (59.5)	18.9 (66.0)	21.4 (70.5)	20.5 (68.9)	16.7 (62.1)	12.9 (55.2)	6.2 (43.2)	2.9 (37.2)	11.5 (52.7)
Daily mean °C (°F)	−1.4 (29.5)	−1.1 (30.0)	2.0 (35.6)	5.4 (41.7)	10.0 (50.0)	13.2 (55.8)	15.5 (59.9)	14.9 (58.8)	11.6 (52.9)	8.0 (46.4)	2.4 (36.3)	−0.5 (31.1)	6.7 (44.1)
Mean daily minimum °C (°F)	−4.6 (23.7)	−4.6 (23.7)	−1.8 (28.8)	1.3 (34.3)	5.6 (42.1)	8.3 (46.9)	10.6 (51.1)	10.5 (50.9)	7.5 (45.5)	4.4 (39.9)	−0.6 (30.9)	−3.5 (25.7)	2.8 (37.0)
Average precipitation mm (inches)	68 (2.7)	58 (2.3)	68 (2.7)	84 (3.3)	115 (4.5)	106 (4.2)	112 (4.4)	121 (4.8)	114 (4.5)	88 (3.5)	99 (3.9)	66 (2.6)	1,101 (43.3)
Average snowfall cm (inches)	81.1 (31.9)	71.3 (28.1)	54.6 (21.5)	37.9 (14.9)	9 (3.5)	0.8 (0.3)	0 (0)	0 (0)	1 (0.4)	11.6 (4.6)	51 (20)	63.4 (25.0)	381.7 (150.3)
Average precipitation days (≥ 1.0 mm)	8.4	7.8	9.3	8.9	11.8	11.9	11.4	12.5	9.5	8.8	9.4	9.0	118.7
Average snowy days (≥ 1.0 cm)	10.2	9.6	8.2	5.4	1.1	0.2	0	0	0.1	1.3	6.9	9.1	52.1
Average relative humidity (%)	68	67	67	66	67	69	69	72	73	71	73	71	69
Mean monthly sunshine hours	87	98	131	130	143	167	195	181	154	120	79	73	1,557
Source: MeteoSwiss

== Notable people ==
- Felix Maria Diogg (1762–1834), Classicism portrait painter

== See also ==
- Porta Alpina, a proposed railway station in the Gotthard Base Tunnel (an important rail tunnel running beneath the Alps).
