= Adula Alps =

Mountain range in Switzerland and Italy

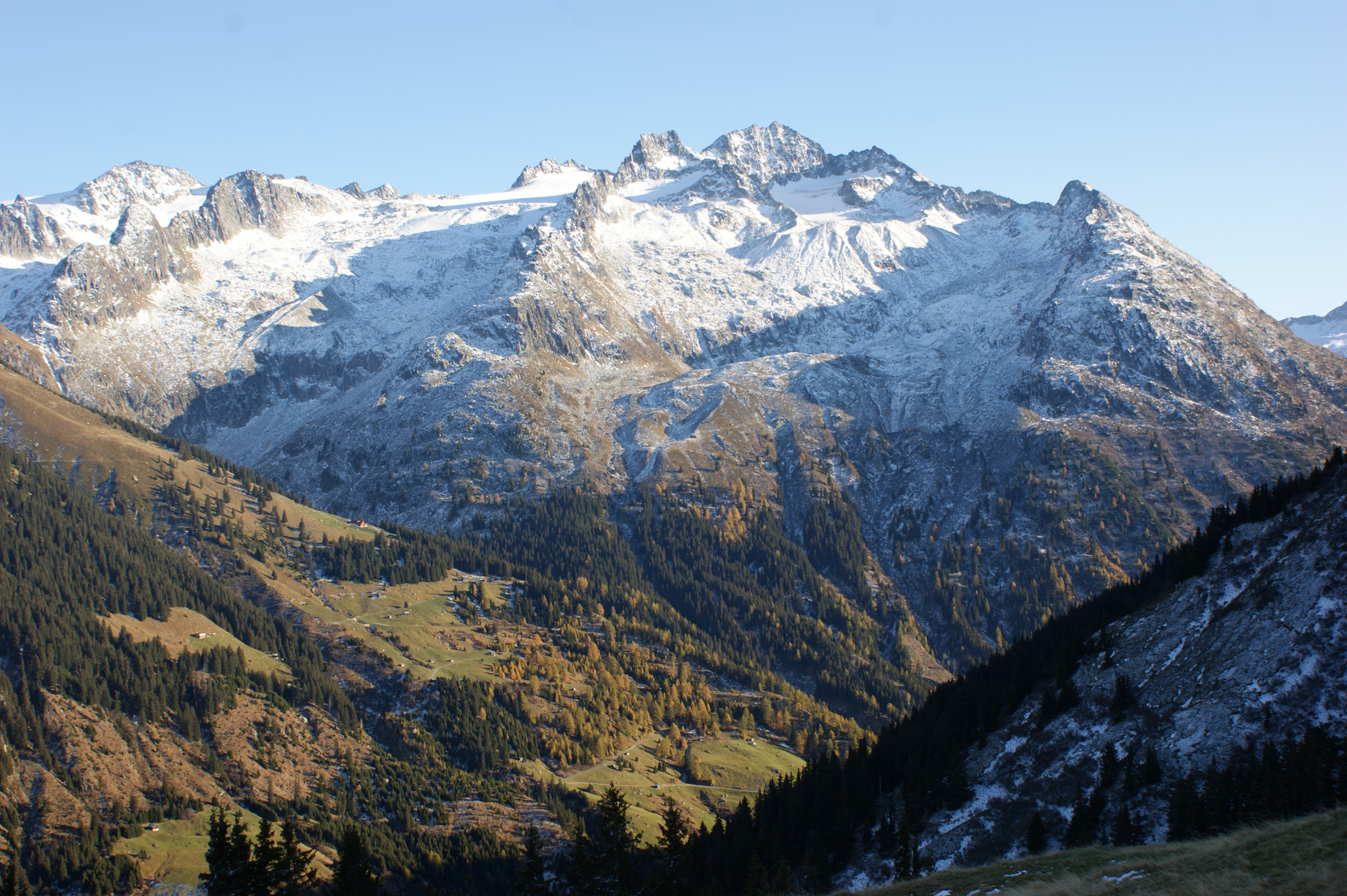
- Some peaks: Piz Medel (left, 3,210 m), Piz Uffiern (3,151 m), Piz dalla Siala (3,023 m), Piz a Spescha (3,109 m)

Highest point
- Peak: Rheinwaldhorn
- Elevation: 3,402 metres (11,161 feet)

Naming
- Native name: German: Adula-Alpen; Italian: Alpi dell'Adula

Geography
- State(s): Cantons of Ticino, Graubünden, and Uri, Switzerland; Province of Sondrio in Lombardy, Italy
- Range coordinates: 47°29′37″N 9°02′24″E
- Parent range: Lepontine Alps
- Borders on: Rhaetian Alps; Bernese Alps; Glarus Alps

Geology
- Orogeny: Alpine

The Adula Alps, also known as the West Graubünden and Misox Alps, are a western Alpine mountain group, the part of the Lepontine Alps from the Lukmanier and St Gotthard Passes to the Splügen Pass.

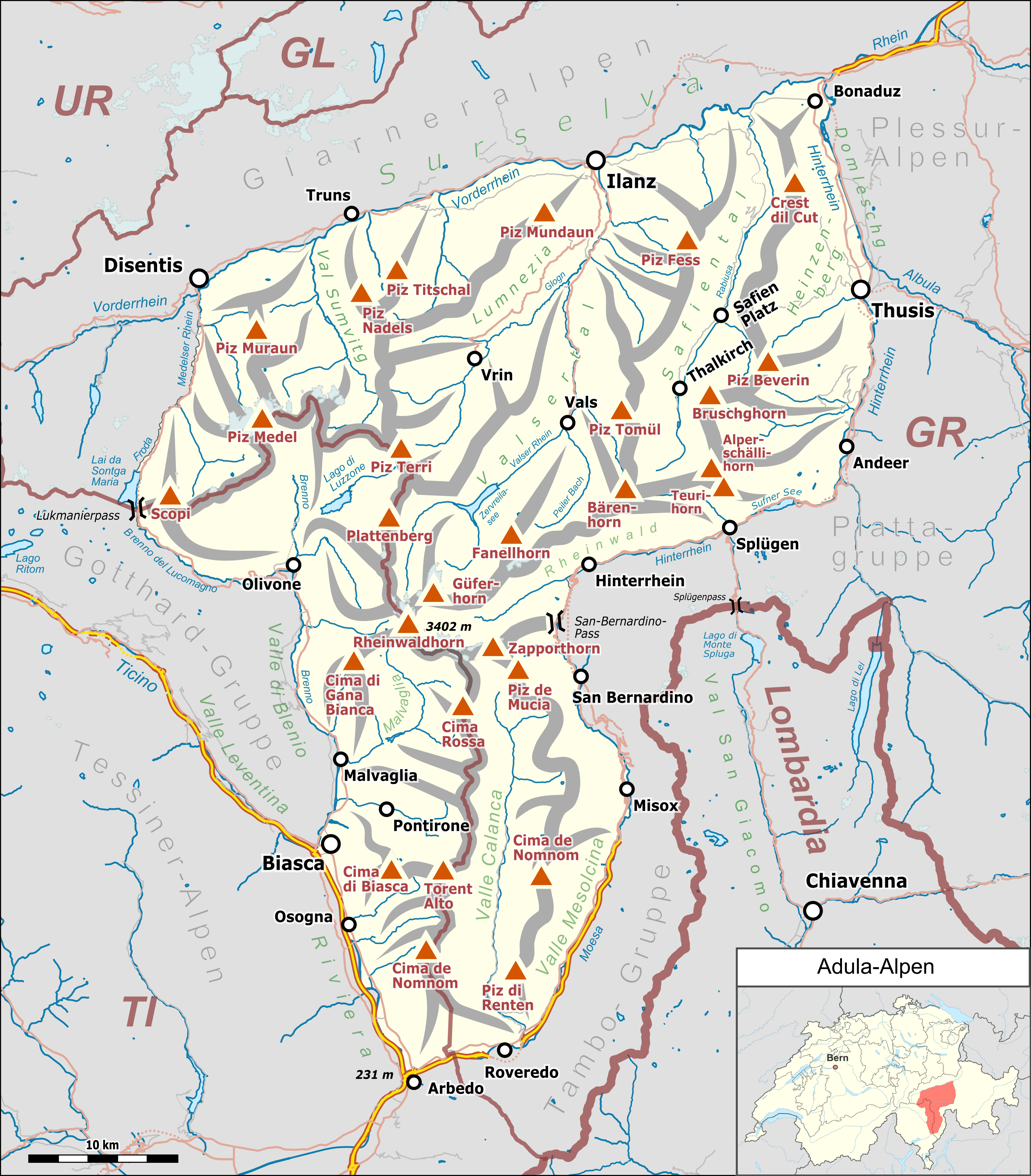
The Swiss side of the Adula Alps

They lie mostly in Switzerland, in the Cantons of Ticino, Graubünden, and Uri, and partly in Italy, in the province of Sondrio in Lombardy, stretching south to Lake Como. They form subsection 10B of the Alps, according to the Partizione delle Alpi, and subsection 10 III, according to the unified orographic classification of the Alps by Sergio Marazzi (SOIUSA).

A string of mountains of the Adula stand on the international border between Switzerland and Italy, including Pizzo Tambò, Piz di Pian, Cima de Pian Guarnei (Pizzo Quadro), Cime di Val Loga, Piz Tamborello, Piz della Forcola, Pizzaccio, and Cima dello Stagn, while Pizzo Ferré is near the border on the Italian side.

The mountain guides of the Swiss Alpine Club do not lead climbers in groups for the Adula Alps, but attach parts of them to other sections.

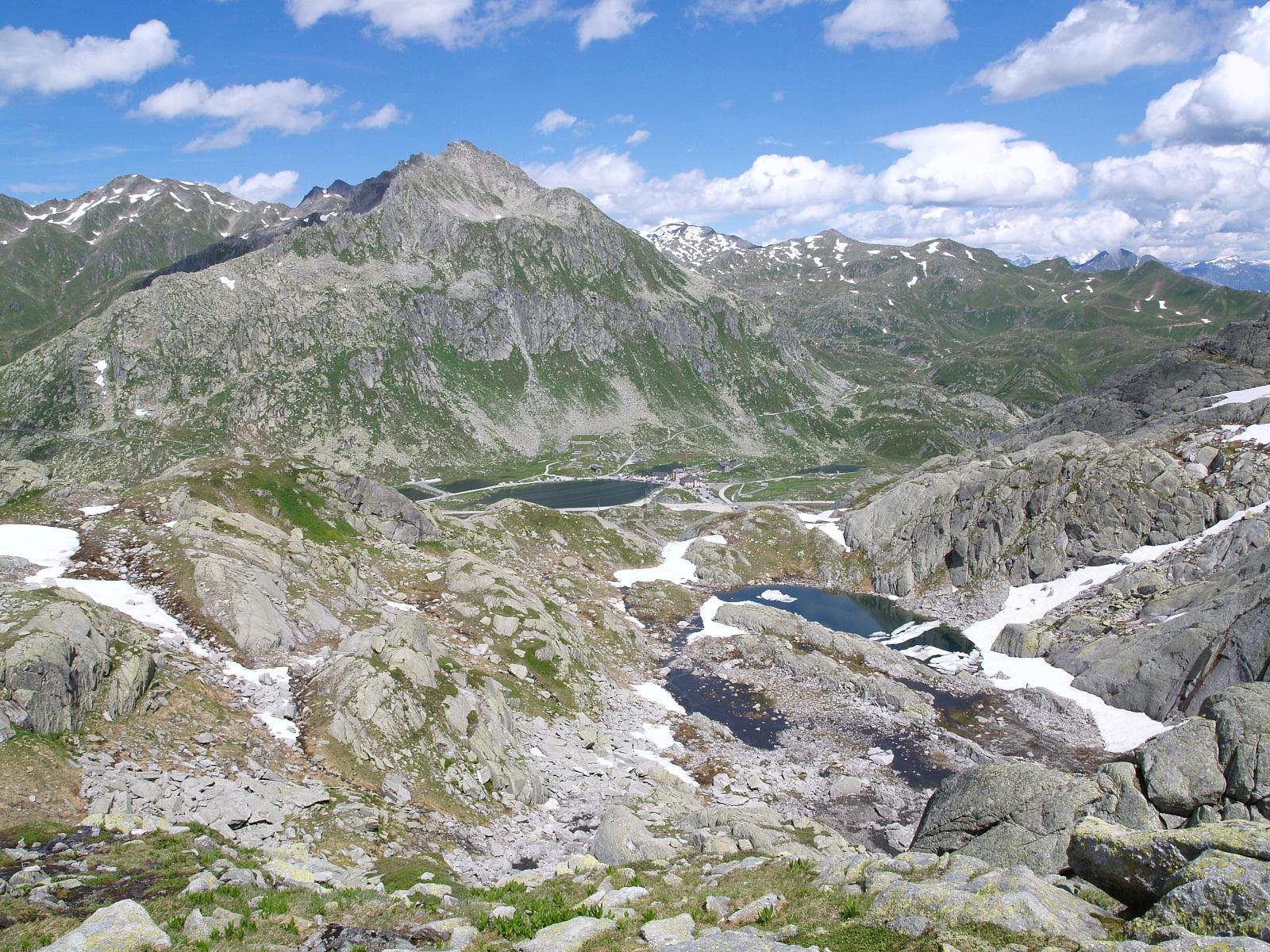
Looking west from the Gotthard Pass into the Adula Alps

The highest peak is the Rheinwaldhorn (3,402 metres; 11,161 feet), which in Italian is called the Adula, giving the range its name.

The main valleys are Val Malvaglia, which drains into the lower Blenio Valley, and three others draining south out of the Adula Alps, which are, from west to east, Val Calanca, Valle Mesolcina, and Valle Spluga (or San Giacomo).

The creation of an Adula National Park was planned by Switzerland for sixteen years, from 2000. It would have become only the second in the country, after the Swiss National Park, but in November 2016 the inhabitants voted against it.

== Towns and villages ==
In Uri

- Andermatt

In Graubünden

- Disentis or Mustér
- Trun or Truns
- Ilanz
- Bonaduz
- Thusis
- Andeer
- Splügen or Spluga
- Hinterrhein
- San Bernardino
- Mesocco
- Obersaxen
- Rossa
- Roveredo
- Arbedo-Castione
- Vrin
- Vals
- Thalkirch
- Safien

In Ticino

- Osogna
- Biasca
- Malvaglia
- Olivone
- Lumino

In Lombardy

- Livo

== Peaks ==
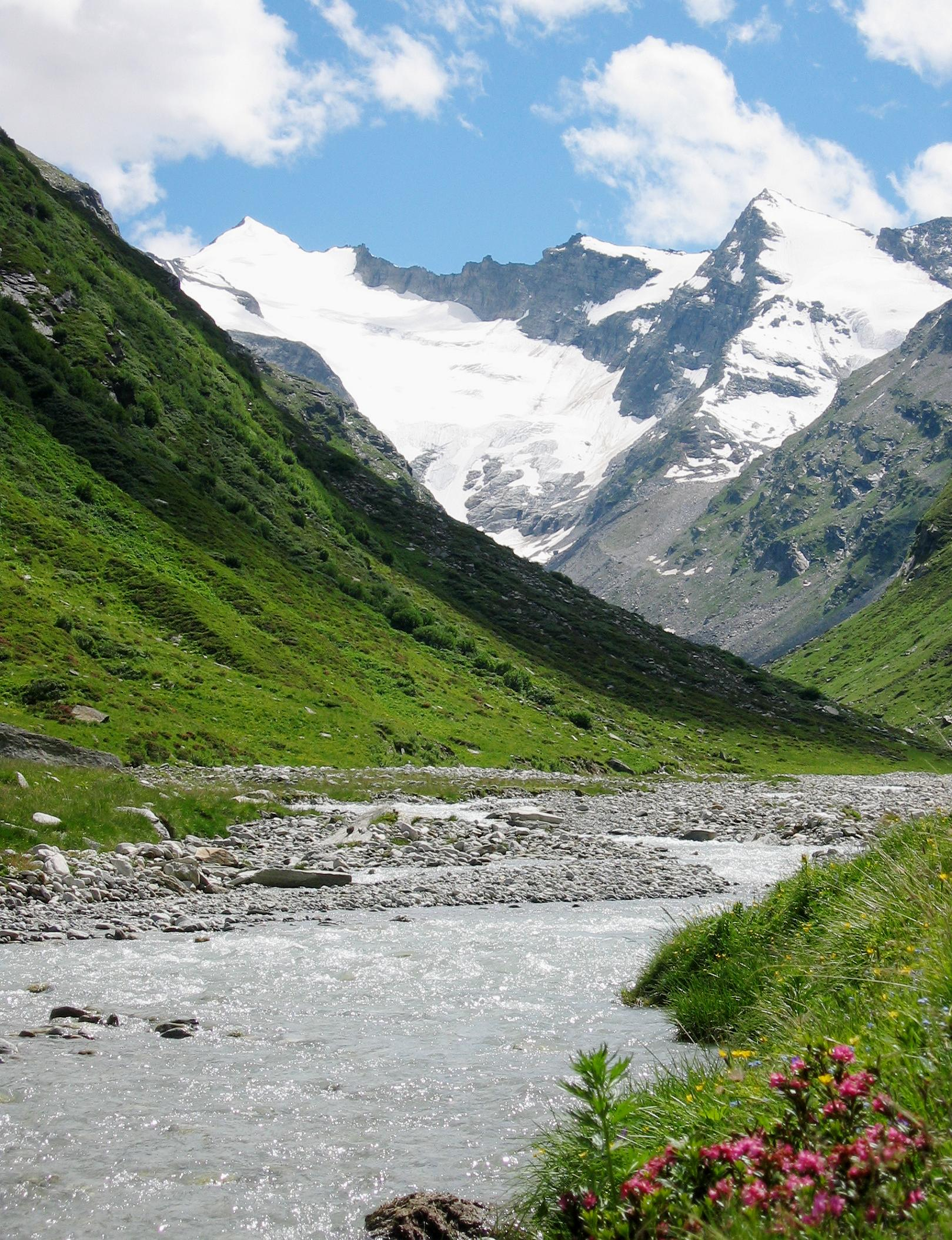
The Rheinwaldhorn (left) seen from near Vals

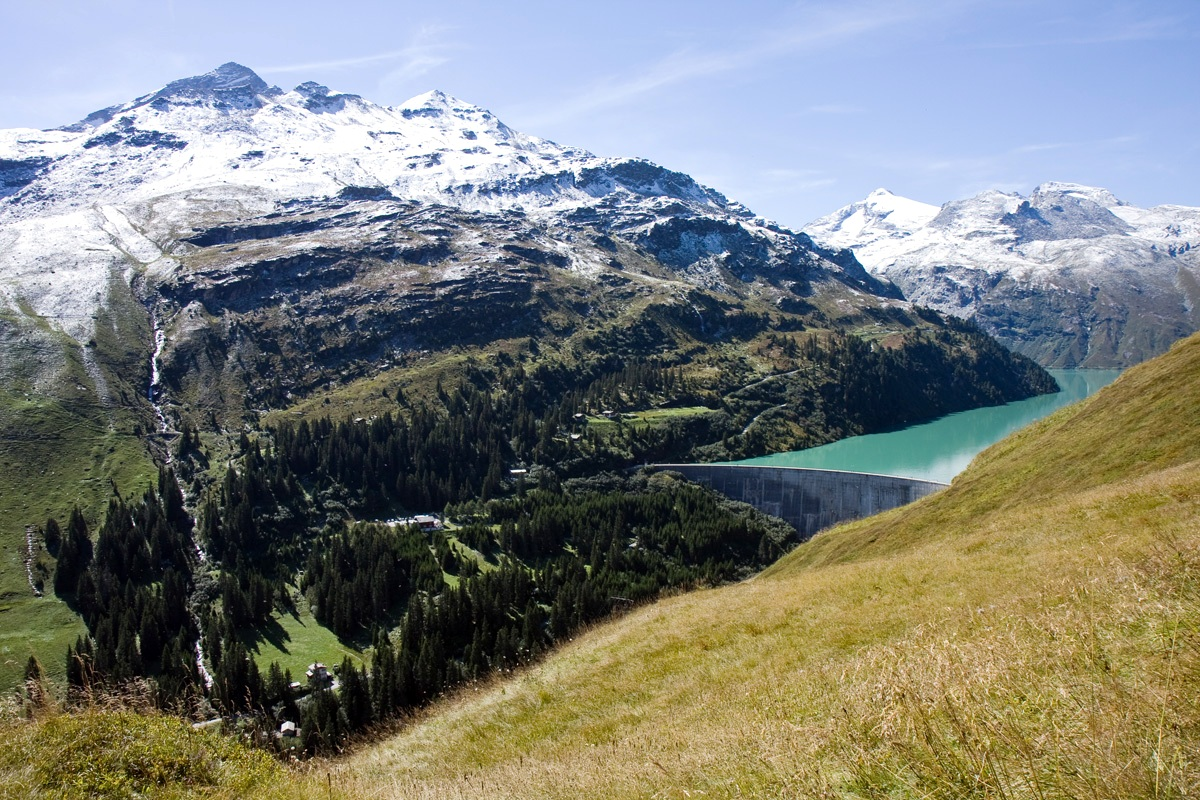
The Guferhorn, or Zervreila, with Zervreilasee at its foot

The following peaks of the Adela Alps are sorted by height in metres (m) above sea level, called Meter über Meer (m ü. M.) in Switzerland:

- Rheinwaldhorn (3,402 m)
- Güferhorn (3,379 m)
- Pizzo Tambò (3,279 m)
- Grauhorn (3,260 m)
- Läntahorn (3,237 m)
- Vogelberg (3,218 m)
- Piz Medel (3,210 m)
- Pizzo di Cassimoi (3,129 m)
- Scopi (3,190 m)
- Cima di Camadra (3,172 m)
- Cima Rossa (3,161 m)
- Piz di Pian (3,158 m)
- Zapporthorn (3,152 m)
- Piz Terri (3,149 m)
- Fanellhorn (3,124 m)
- Piz Scharboda (3,122 m)
- Pizzo Ferré (3,103 m)
- Bruschghorn (3,056 m)
- Furggeltihorn (3,043 m)
- Plattenberg (3,041 m)
- Alperschällihorn (3,036 m)
- Frunthorn (3,030 m)
- Piz Corbet (3,025 m)
- Cima de Pian Guarnei (3,015 m)
- Piz Uffiern (Tujetsch) (3,013 m)
- Cime di Val Loga (3,004 m)
- Piz Beverin (2,997 m)
- Piz de la Lumbreida (2,983 m)
- Teurihorn (2,973 m)
- Torent Alto (2,948 m)
- Piz Tomül (2,946 m)
- Einshorn (2,944 m)
- Zervreilahorn (2,898 m)
- Pizzo Tamborello (2,858 m)
- Pizzo di Claro (2,727 m)
- Pizzo Paglia (2,593 m)
- Piz Titschal (2,550 m)
- Pizzo Cavregasco (2,535 m)
- Cima dello Stagn (2,380 m)
- Sosto (2,221 m)

== Lakes ==
In Switzerland

- Sufnersee, reservoir dating from 1962, surface area 0.94 km^{2} (0.36 sq mi)
- Zervreilasee, reservoir dating from 1957
- Lago di Luzzone, reservoir dating from 1963, surface area 1.27 km^{2} (0.49 sq mi)

In Italy

- Lake Como, a glacial lake with an area of 146 square kilometres (56 mi^{2}).

== Mountain huts ==
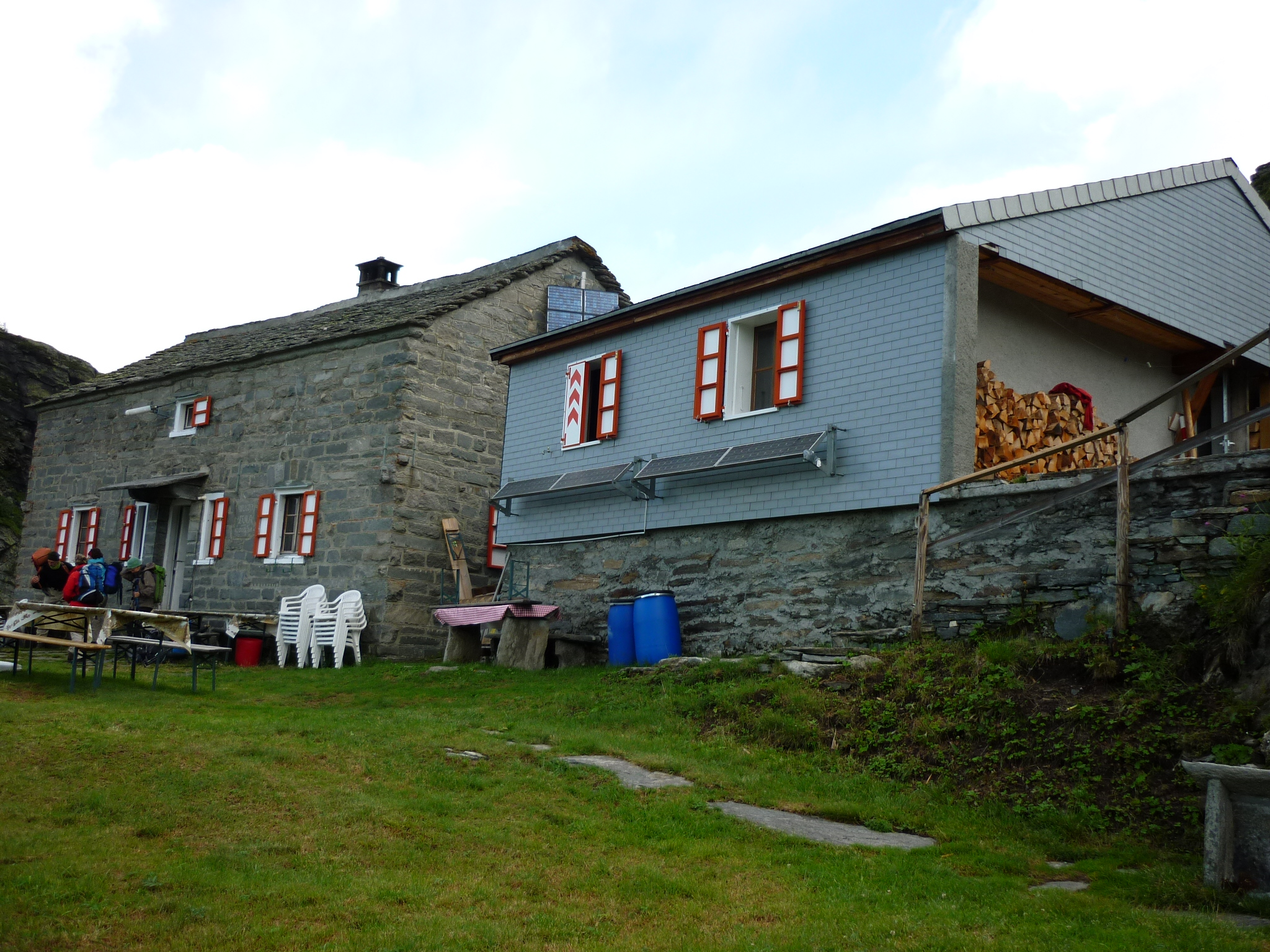
The Adulahuette of the Swiss Alpine Club

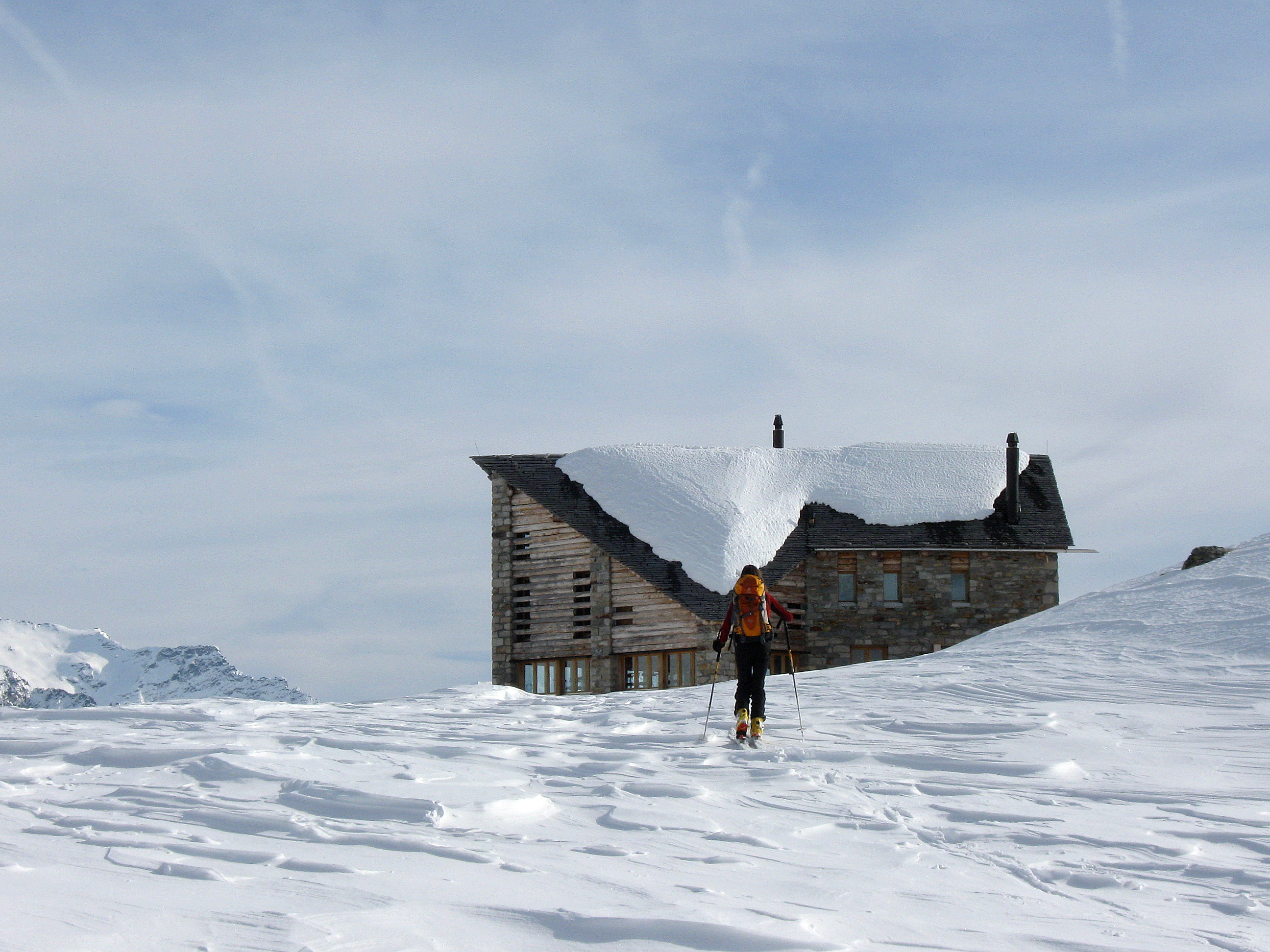
The Capanna Quarnei of the Società Alpinistica Bassa Blenio

- Camona da Medel, 2524 m
- Capanna Adula of the UTOE, 2393 m
- Zapporthütte, at 2276 m on the Zapporthorn
- Capanna Scaletta, Blenio, 2,205 m
- Capanna Scaradra, Blenio, 2,173 m
- Capanna Motterascio, Ghirone, 2,172 m
- Camona da Terri, 2,170 m
- Capanna Quarnei, Malvaglia, 2,107 m
- Adulahuette of the SAC, 2,012 m
- Länta-Hütte, at 2,090 m on the Läntahorn
- Medelserhütte, on the Piz Medel
- Capanna Buffalora, Rossa, 2,078 m
- Capanna di Cava, Biasca, 2,066 m
- Rifugio Biasagn, Biasca, 2,023 m
- Capanna Brogoldone, Lumino, 1,904 m
- Capanna Bovarina, Campo Blenio, 1,870 m
- Capanna Como, at Livo, Lombardy, 1,790 m
- Capanna Dötra, 1,748 m, on Sosto
