= Andermatt =

- Municipality
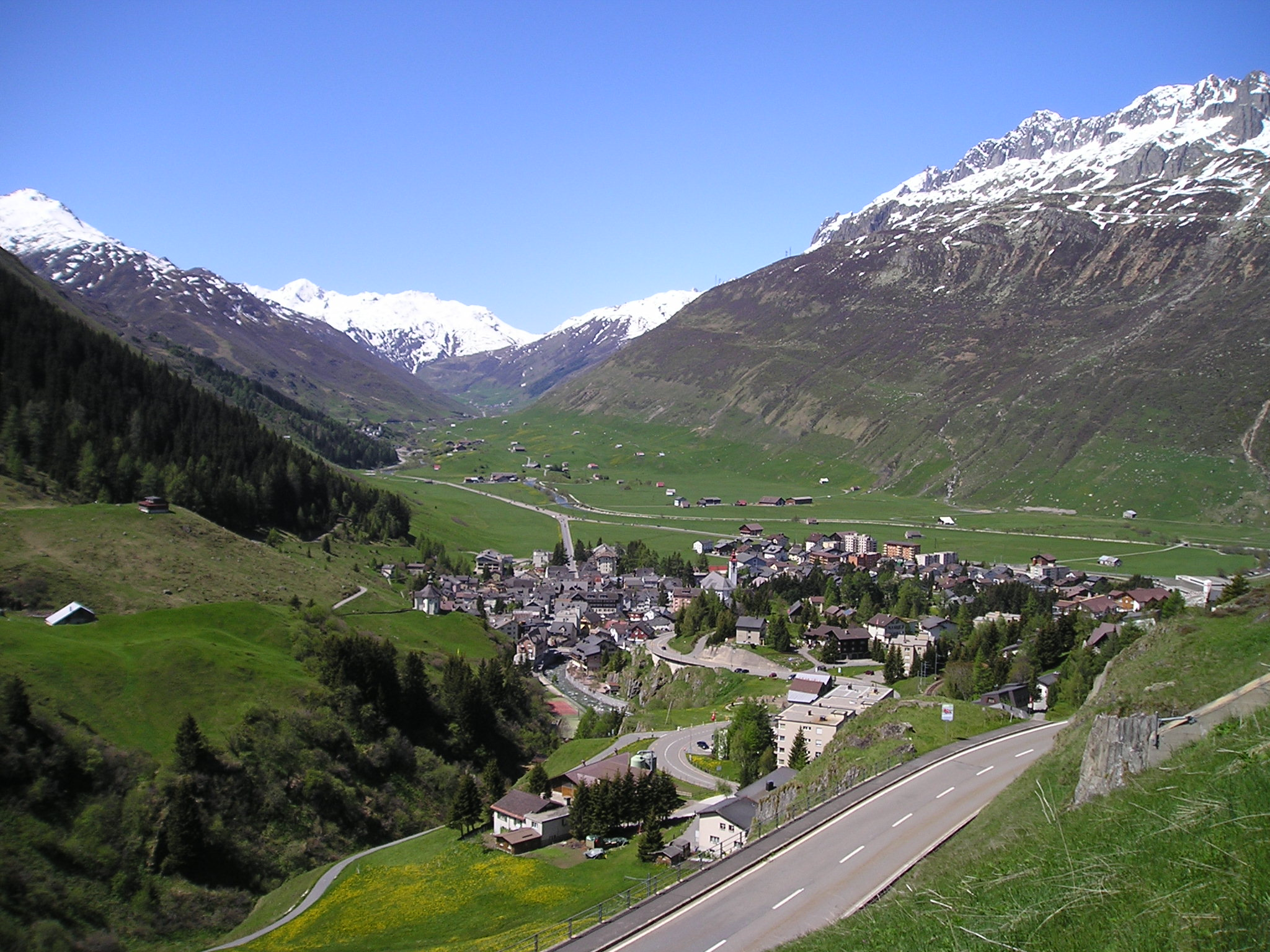
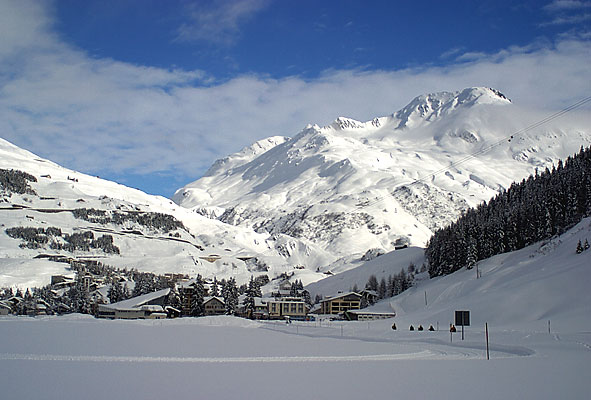
- Andermatt looking west through the Urseren valley towards Hospental in front and the Furka Pass in the back (March 2005) Andermatt looking east towards the Oberalp Pass with cable car (to Gemsstock) bottom station in front and Rossbodenstock (2836m) in the back (8 Feb 2003)

- Flag Coat of arms
- Location of Andermatt
- Location within Switzerland Location within Canton of Uri
- Coordinates: 46°37′N 8°35′E
- Country: Switzerland
- Canton: Uri
- District: n.a.

Government
  - Executive: Gemeinderat with 5 members
  - Mayor: Präsidentin; Yvonne Baumann
  - Parliament: none (Offene Dorfgemeinde)

Area
  - Total: 62.26 km^{2} (24.04 sq mi)
- Elevation (Church): 1,437 m (4,715 ft)
- Highest elevation (Pizzo Centrale): 2,999 m (9,839 ft)
- Lowest elevation (Schöllenen): 1,289 m (4,229 ft)

Population (December 2020)
  - Total: 1,527
  - Density: 24.53/km^{2} (63.52/sq mi)
- Demonym: German: Andermatter(in)
- Time zone: UTC+01:00 (CET)
  - Summer (DST): UTC+02:00 (CEST)
- Postal code: 6490
- SFOS number: 1202
- ISO 3166 code: CH-UR
- Localities: Andermatt, Gurschen, Unteralp, Nätschen, Oberalp, Alp Rossboden
- Surrounded by: Airolo (TI), Göschenen, Gurtnellen, Hospental, Tujetsch (GR)
- Website: www.gemeinde-andermatt.ch

Andermatt (Romansh: Ursera) is a mountain village and municipality in the canton of Uri in Switzerland. At an elevation of 1,437 meters (4,715 ft) above sea level, Andermatt is located at the center of the Saint-Gotthard Massif and the historical center cross of north-south and east-west traverses of Switzerland. It is some 28 km (17 mi) south of Altdorf, the capital of Uri.

== Geography ==
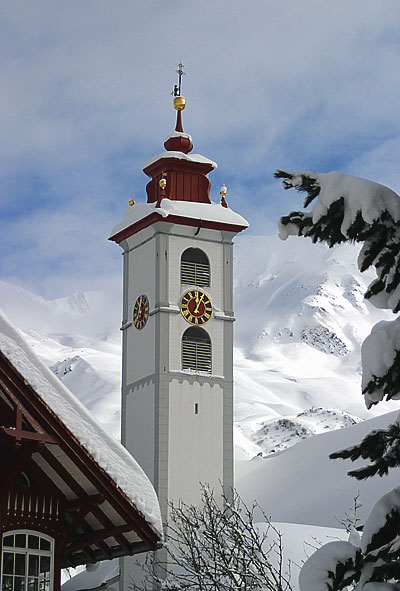
Parish Church St. Peter and Paul in Andermatt

Aerial view by Walter Mittelholzer (1931)

Andermatt is in the Urseren valley, on the headwaters of the river Reuss and surrounded by the Adula Alps. Immediately to the north of Andermatt, the Reuss flows through the steeply descending Schöllenen Gorge (or "the Schöllenen") to Göschenen and further down the Reuss Valley to the north. It then flows, near Altdorf, into the Urnersee, part of Lake Lucerne. In the other three directions, the valley is linked by three Alpine passes: the Oberalp Pass (6,706 ft; 2,044 m) to the east, the St Gotthard Pass (6,909 ft; 2,106 m) to the south and the Furka Pass (7,992 ft; 2,436 m) to the west.

Andermatt has an area, as of 2006, of 62.2 km^{2} (24.0 sq mi). Of this area, 40.8% is used for agricultural purposes, while 5.5% is forested. Of the rest of the land, 1.7% is settled (buildings or roads) and the remainder (52%) is non-productive (rivers, glaciers or mountains). In the 1993/97 land survey, 0.4% of the total land area was heavily forested, while 5.1% is covered in small trees and shrubbery. Of the agricultural land, 4.3% is used for orchards or vine crops and 36.5% is used for alpine pastures. Of the settled areas, 0.5% is covered with buildings, and 1.1% is transportation infrastructure. Of the unproductive areas, 0.5% is unproductive standing water (ponds or lakes), 1.0% is unproductive flowing water (rivers), 30.9% is too rocky for vegetation, and 19.7% is other unproductive land.

== Transport ==
Andermatt serves as a crossroads between southern Switzerland and the north as well as between eastern Switzerland (i.e. Graubünden/Grisons) and western Switzerland, (i.e. Valais, Bern and the Swiss Romande). The village is connected by three Alpine passes: the Oberalp Pass (6,706 ft; 2,044 m.) to the east connecting the Surselva in the canton of Graubünden, the St Gotthard Pass (6,909 ft; 2,106 m.) to the south connecting with the Valle Leventina in canton of Ticino, and the Furka Pass (7,992 ft; 2,436 m.) to the west connecting with the Obergoms in canton of Valais. To the north the steeply descending Schöllenen Gorge links Andermatt with Göschenen and is the location of the famous Devil's Bridge.

Since the opening of the Schöllenen route, around 1200, Andermatt has been on the Gotthard route.

The town is served by a railway station owned and operated by Matterhorn Gotthard Bahn (MGB). The station is connected with Brig and Visp (Valais) and with the western terminus of the Rhaetian Railway at Disentis/Mustér (Grisons). There is also a very short branch line, the Schöllenenbahn, nowadays part of MGB, between Andermatt and Göschenen, at the northern end of the Gotthard Rail Tunnel, connecting with the Gotthard railway line.

== History ==
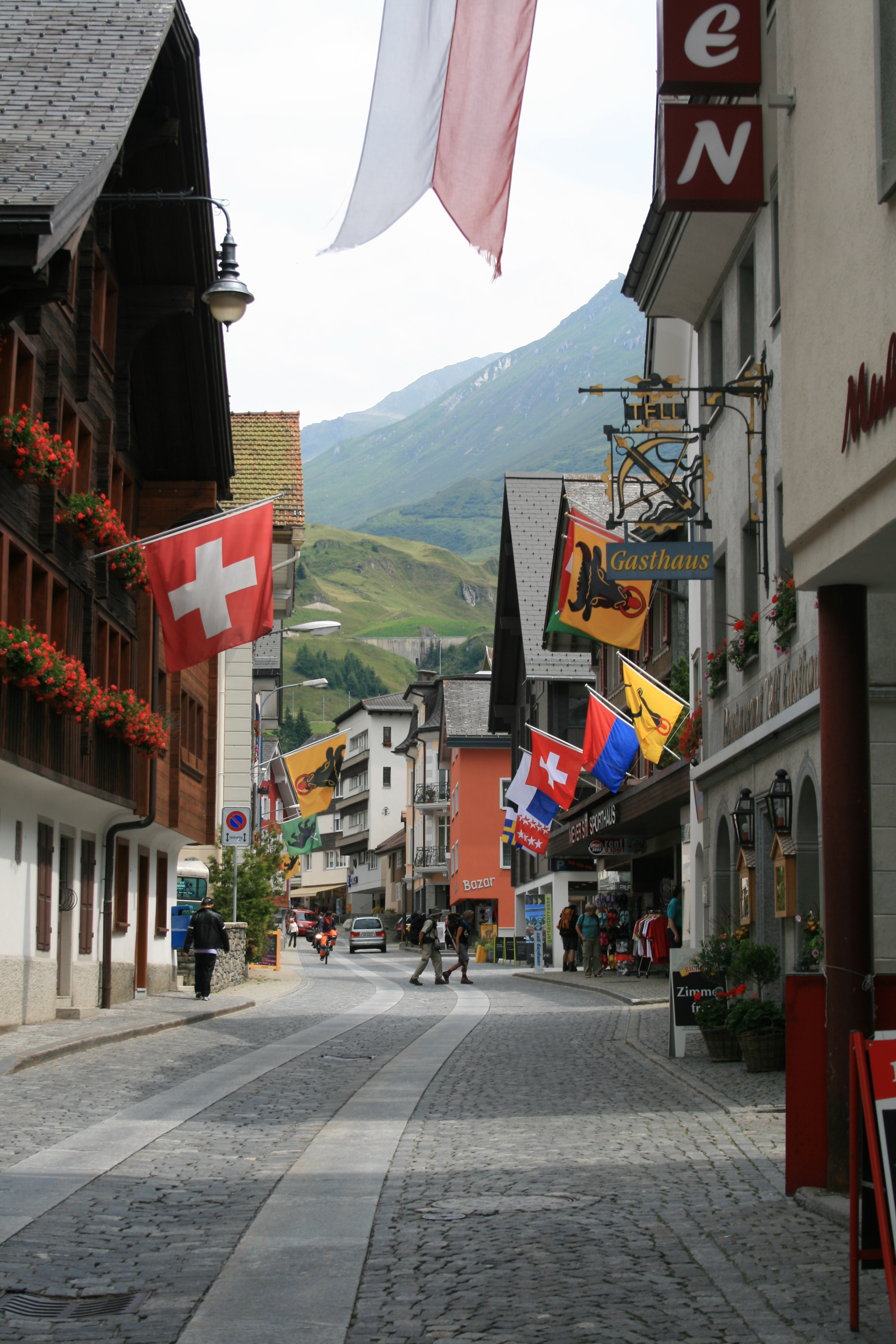
Andermatt village centre

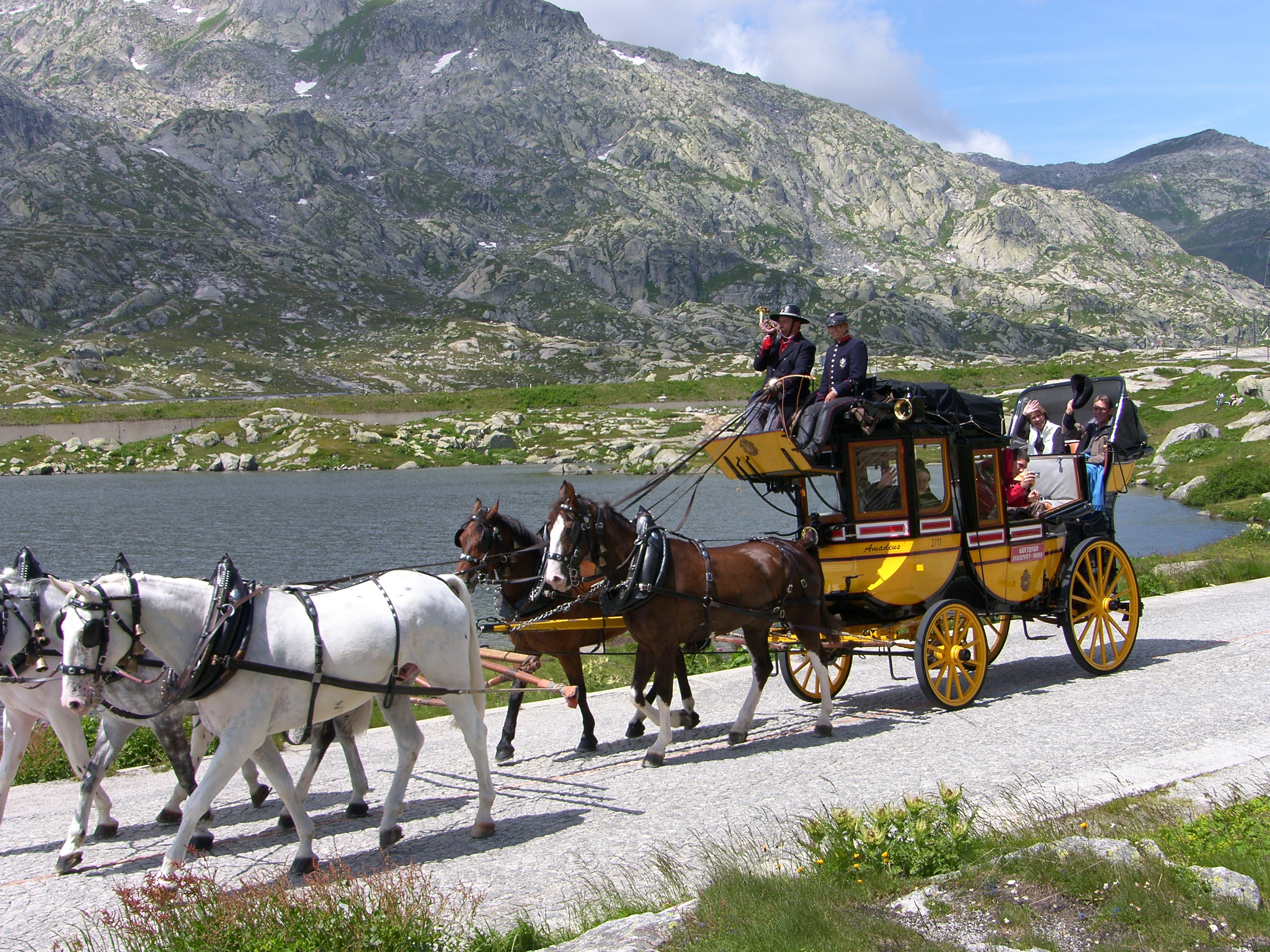
Old St Gotthard post on the pass

Archaeological finds dating back to 4000 BC indicate that the Urseren was already populated in the Neolithic period. During Roman times this Alpine valley was probably inhabited by some Helvetic Celtic tribes. However, the origins of Andermatt can only be traced back to Alemannic tribes, the Walsers, who established settlements in the area, where the current town of Andermatt is situated.

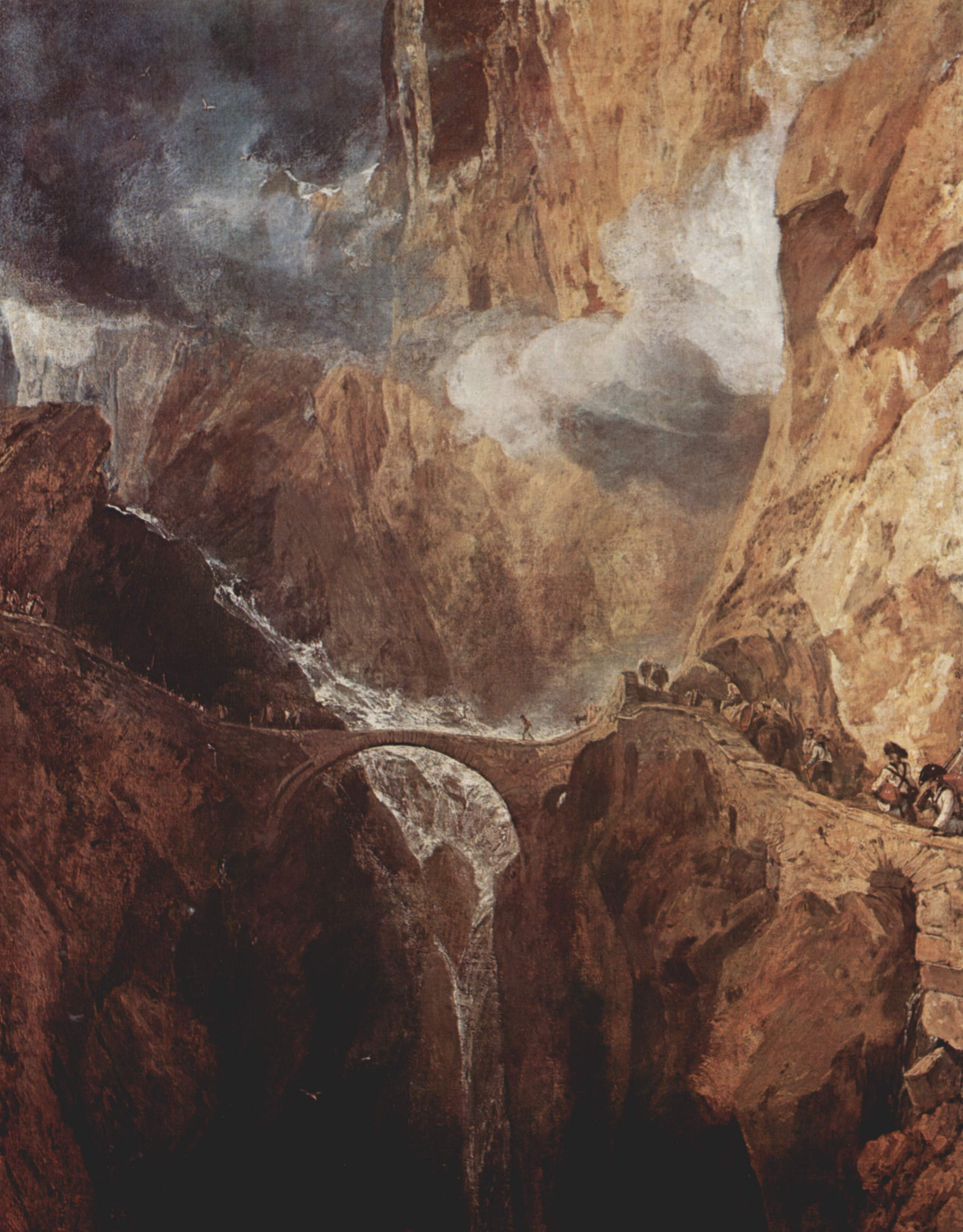
The Devil's Bridge by J.M.W. Turner (ca. 1803/04)

The parish of Andermatt was not mentioned until 1203; it was held by the Benedictine Disentis Abbey. This first mention refers to it as de Prato. In 1290 it was mentioned as A der Matte. In 1649, with the emergence of an independent Swiss Confederation, the ecclesiastical rights of the Disentis monastery were revoked in favour of civil legislation.

In the Flight of the Earls, Irish earls lost a fortune in gold at the Devil's Bridge crossing the ravine on St Patrick's Day 1608. It has never been recovered and is known as the Lost Treasure of the St Gotthard Pass.

Nearby Schöllenen Gorge is the site of a memorial commemorating the 1799 campaign of the Russian general Alexander Suvorov.

Between 1818–1831 the nearby St Gotthard Pass was made accessible to stagecoaches. As the last resort before the pass, Andermatt flourished economically and became a popular spa town.

However the opening in 1881 of the St Gotthard railway tunnel reversed the village's fortunes, as the tunnel runs immediately beneath it, connecting the Central Swiss town of Göschenen with Airolo in Ticino. Some Andermattians who worked on the tunnel were killed during its construction. A strike by the tunnel workers, furthermore, was put down by military force, killing a further four workers.

Since 1885, Andermatt has been a garrison town of the Swiss Federal Army. Here the infrastructure for the High Command of the Swiss Federal Army in the event of war was built. Today it is the location of a training centre of the Swiss army.

Plans to build a series of reservoirs in the valley of Andermatt, the Urseren, encountered fierce resistance by the locals in 1946 and were abandoned four years later. A huge reservoir was built instead in the next valley, the Göschenertal.

Several avalanches, in particular in the winters of 1951 and 1975, have caused havoc in some residential areas of Andermatt, killing some residents.

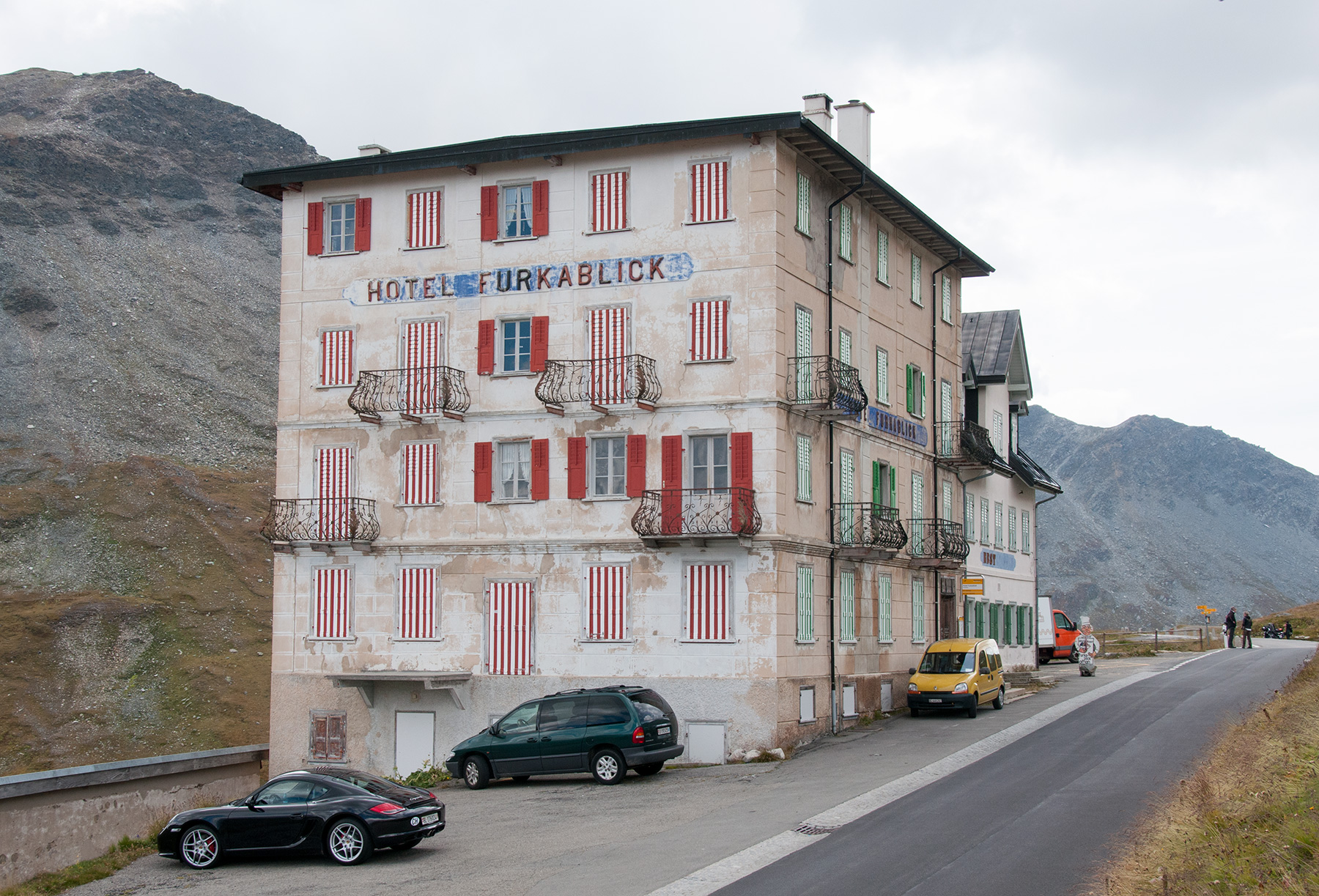
Hotel Furkablick on the Furka Pass, east side

By the 1930s the village's income from tourism had seriously declined, and many of the Ursental's hotels were abandoned or changed use. The Grand Hotel Bellevue, which was built by the aristocratic Müller family from neighbouring Hospental (who at one time or another owned many other hotels nearby including the Hotel Furkablick and Hotel Furka Passhöhe - as well as hotels in Flüelen, Alpnachstad, Herisau and Neuchâtel) was converted in the 1970s into apartments, but by 1990 it had been abandoned and was demolished with explosives. By the turn of the 21st century, as an alternative to the expensive ski resorts St Moritz and Gstaad, Andermatt steadily expanded its ski resort. Andermatt-Sedrun-Disentis are now three interconnected all-season resorts and serviced by the Glacier Express train.

== Demographics ==
Andermatt has a population (as of 31 December 2020) of 1,527. As of 2007, 10.0% of the population was made up of foreign nationals. Over the last 10 years the population has decreased by −8.8%. Most of the population (as of 2000) speaks German (95.2%), with Portuguese being second most common (1.0%) and Italian being third (0.9%). As of 2007 the gender distribution of the population was 50.8% male and 49.2% female.

In Andermatt about 75.2% of the population (between age 25-64) have completed either non-mandatory upper secondary education or additional higher education (either university or a Fachhochschule).

Andermatt has an unemployment rate of 0.9%. As of 2005, there were 51 people employed in the primary economic sector and about 22 businesses involved in this sector. 90 people are employed in the secondary sector and there are 13 businesses in this sector. 599 people are employed in the tertiary sector, with 78 businesses in this sector.

Historical population
Year	Population
1799	605
1850	677
1900	818
1950	1,231
1970	1,589
2000	1,282
2008	1,242
2010	1,304
2014	1,408

== Real-estate developments ==
Andermatt is exempt from Switzerland’s Lex Koller restrictions, allowing foreign nationals to purchase real estate without authorization as part of the Andermatt Swiss Alps development. In 2006, the Swiss Federal Council granted this exception, citing the region’s economic reorientation needs after the withdrawal of federal enterprises, such as the Swiss Army. The SFr1.8 billion project, led by Samih Sawiris, also bypasses second-home restrictions until 2040, attracting international buyers, including a surge of American investors in early 2025 who purchased SFr14.2 million in apartments amid U.S. political uncertainty.

== Climate ==
Between 1991 and 2020 Andermatt had an average of 139.4 days of rain per year and on average received 1,423 mm (56.0 in) of precipitation. The wettest month was November, with an average of 142 mm (5.6 in) of precipitation and an average of 11.8 days with precipitation. The month with the most days of precipitation was June, with an average of 13.2, but with only 131 mm (5.2 in) of precipitation. The driest month of the year was February with an average of 91 mm (3.6 in) of precipitation over 11.4 days. According to the Köppen Climate Classification system, Andermatt has a subarctic climate, abbreviated "dfc" on climate maps.

Climate data for Andermatt, elevation 1,435 m (4,708 ft), (1991–2020 normals, extremes 1973–present)
Month	Jan	Feb	Mar	Apr	May	Jun	Jul	Aug	Sep	Oct	Nov	Dec	Year
Record high °C (°F)	12.5 (54.5)	12.7 (54.9)	14.6 (58.3)	20.5 (68.9)	23.6 (74.5)	28.5 (83.3)	29.5 (85.1)	28.3 (82.9)	25.0 (77.0)	23.0 (73.4)	20.3 (68.5)	11.0 (51.8)	29.5 (85.1)
Mean daily maximum °C (°F)	0.4 (32.7)	1.5 (34.7)	4.5 (40.1)	8.5 (47.3)	12.5 (54.5)	17.0 (62.6)	19.4 (66.9)	18.6 (65.5)	14.2 (57.6)	11.1 (52.0)	5.4 (41.7)	1.6 (34.9)	9.6 (49.3)
Daily mean °C (°F)	−3.7 (25.3)	−3.2 (26.2)	−0.4 (31.3)	4.0 (39.2)	7.8 (46.0)	11.5 (52.7)	13.8 (56.8)	13.3 (55.9)	9.3 (48.7)	6.3 (43.3)	1.5 (34.7)	−2.6 (27.3)	4.8 (40.6)
Mean daily minimum °C (°F)	−8.1 (17.4)	−8.2 (17.2)	−4.3 (24.3)	−0.4 (31.3)	3.7 (38.7)	6.8 (44.2)	8.7 (47.7)	8.5 (47.3)	5.2 (41.4)	2.1 (35.8)	−2.6 (27.3)	−6.8 (19.8)	0.4 (32.7)
Record low °C (°F)	−28.0 (−18.4)	−27.3 (−17.1)	−24.6 (−12.3)	−19.2 (−2.6)	−10.2 (13.6)	−5.0 (23.0)	0.2 (32.4)	−3.5 (25.7)	−4.6 (23.7)	−17.2 (1.0)	−21.5 (−6.7)	−24.5 (−12.1)	−28.0 (−18.4)
Average precipitation mm (inches)	99.4 (3.91)	91.2 (3.59)	102.8 (4.05)	108.5 (4.27)	133.9 (5.27)	131.3 (5.17)	112.5 (4.43)	133.7 (5.26)	130.0 (5.12)	125.3 (4.93)	142.2 (5.60)	112.5 (4.43)	1,423.3 (56.04)
Average snowfall cm (inches)	106.4 (41.9)	110.8 (43.6)	89.4 (35.2)	65.2 (25.7)	18.3 (7.2)	1.3 (0.5)	0.1 (0.0)	0.0 (0.0)	2.4 (0.9)	24.9 (9.8)	81.7 (32.2)	112.2 (44.2)	611.7 (240.8)
Average precipitation days (≥ 1.0 mm)	11.2	10.3	11.5	11.5	12.9	13.2	12.3	12.7	10.4	10.2	11.8	11.4	139.4
Average snowy days (≥ 1.0 cm)	11.2	11.4	9.9	6.2	2.0	0.2	0.0	0.0	0.4	2.6	7.7	12.0	63.6
Average relative humidity (%)	75	75	74	72	73	75	75	77	77	75	77	77	75
Mean monthly sunshine hours	58.4	80.9	133.3	156.3	149.1	190.4	206.0	182.8	155.1	110.4	81.3	59.7	1,563.7
Source 1: NOAA
Source 2: MeteoSwiss Infoclimat

== Skiing ==
Andermatt has two main ski areas in the winter. Nätschen is a mountain located on the north-east side of Andermatt. Gemsstock is a mountain located on the southern side of Andermatt. Both areas are accessible by ski lifts running up from the village, and have valley runs which are open until around mid-March. Additionally, Nätschen is accessible by the railway. There are plans to overhaul the ski areas, and connect Nätschen with the neighbouring slopes of Oberalp, which are currently only accessible by train, however they are a part of the whole ski area.

Andermatt's mountains are popular for their off-piste, deep snow characteristics.

== Entertainment ==
In June 2019, Andermatt's concert hall became the first purpose-built arts venue in an Alpine village, with Constantinos Carydis conducting the Berlin Philharmonic on the venue's opening night. The London-based architect Christina Seilern designed the space and Samih Sawiris funded it. Since 2022, the director, also referred to as intendant, of the concert hall is Lena-Lisa Wüstendörfer.

== Media ==
The gas station Aurora, near the Gemsstock departure, appears in the James Bond movie Goldfinger. Bond fills up his Aston Martin there after a car chase on the Furka pass.

In November 2012 Andermatt appeared on the British television series The Gadget Show, where presenters Jason Bradbury and Pollyanna Woodward were testing electric bicycles, scooters, and several mobile phone photo editing applications, on the hills of Nätschen.

== Notable people ==
- Felix Maria Diogg (1762–1834), Classicism portrait painter
- Bernhard Russi (born August 20, 1948), ski champion and Winter Olympics gold medallist

== Gallery ==
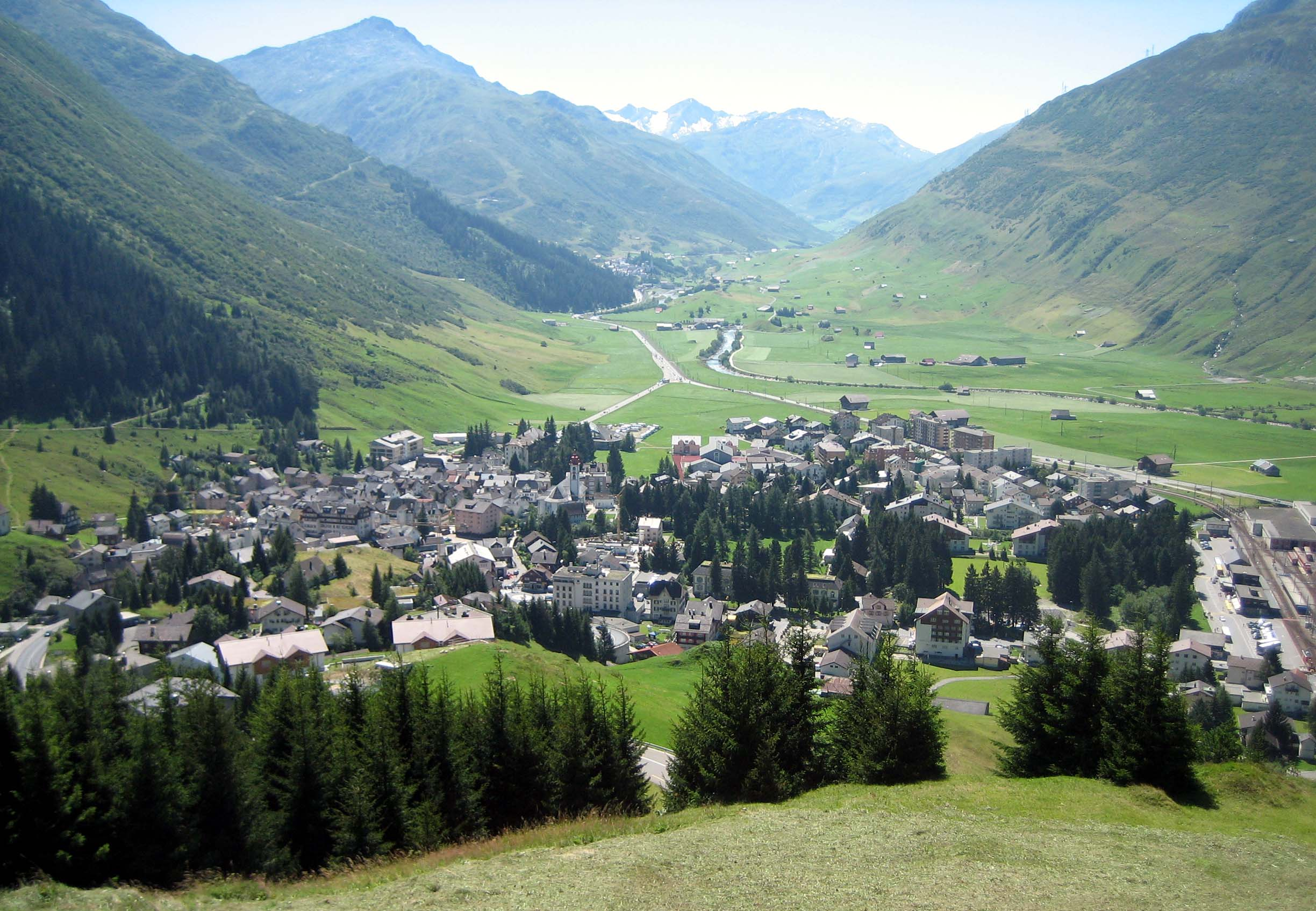
A view of Andermatt from Nätschen looking west through the Urseren towards Hospental in front below the Pizzo d'Orsino/Winterhorn (2661 m) and the Furka Pass (2429 m) in the back (August 2007)

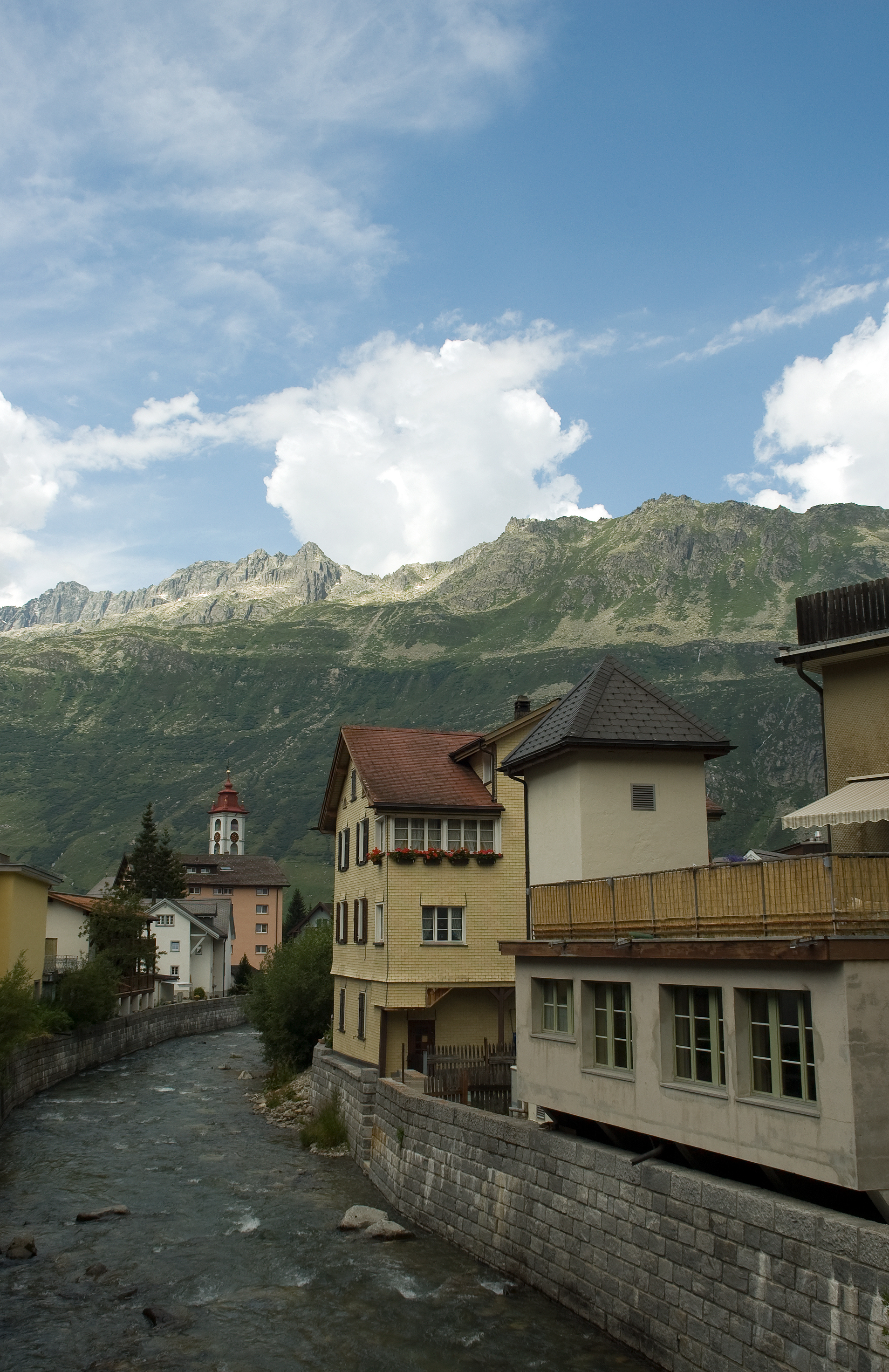
The Unteralpreuss flowing through Andermatt

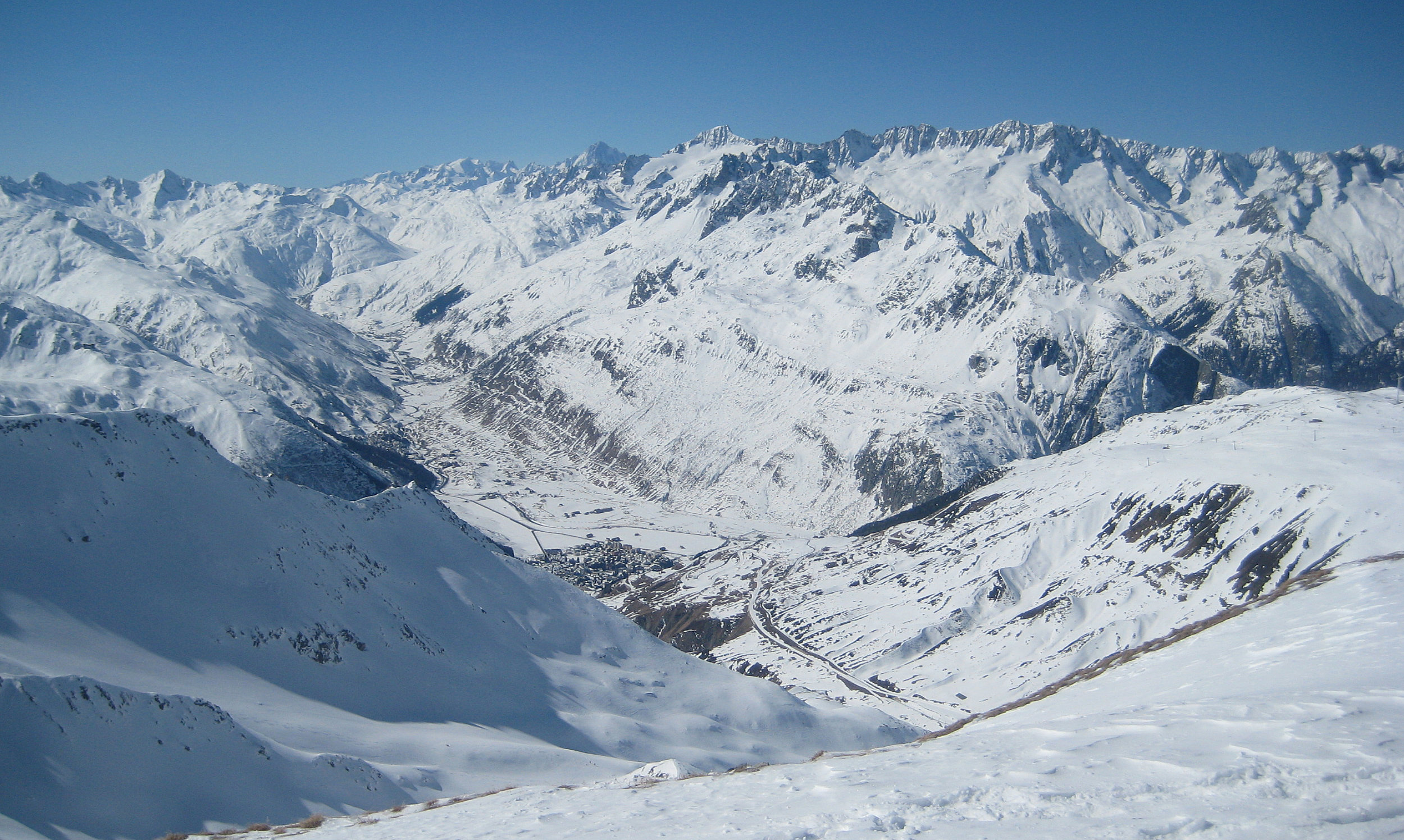
Andermatt from Pazolastock/Piz Nurschalas (2739 m) looking west through the Urseren towards the Bernese Alps with the Finsteraarhorn (4274 m) in the middle

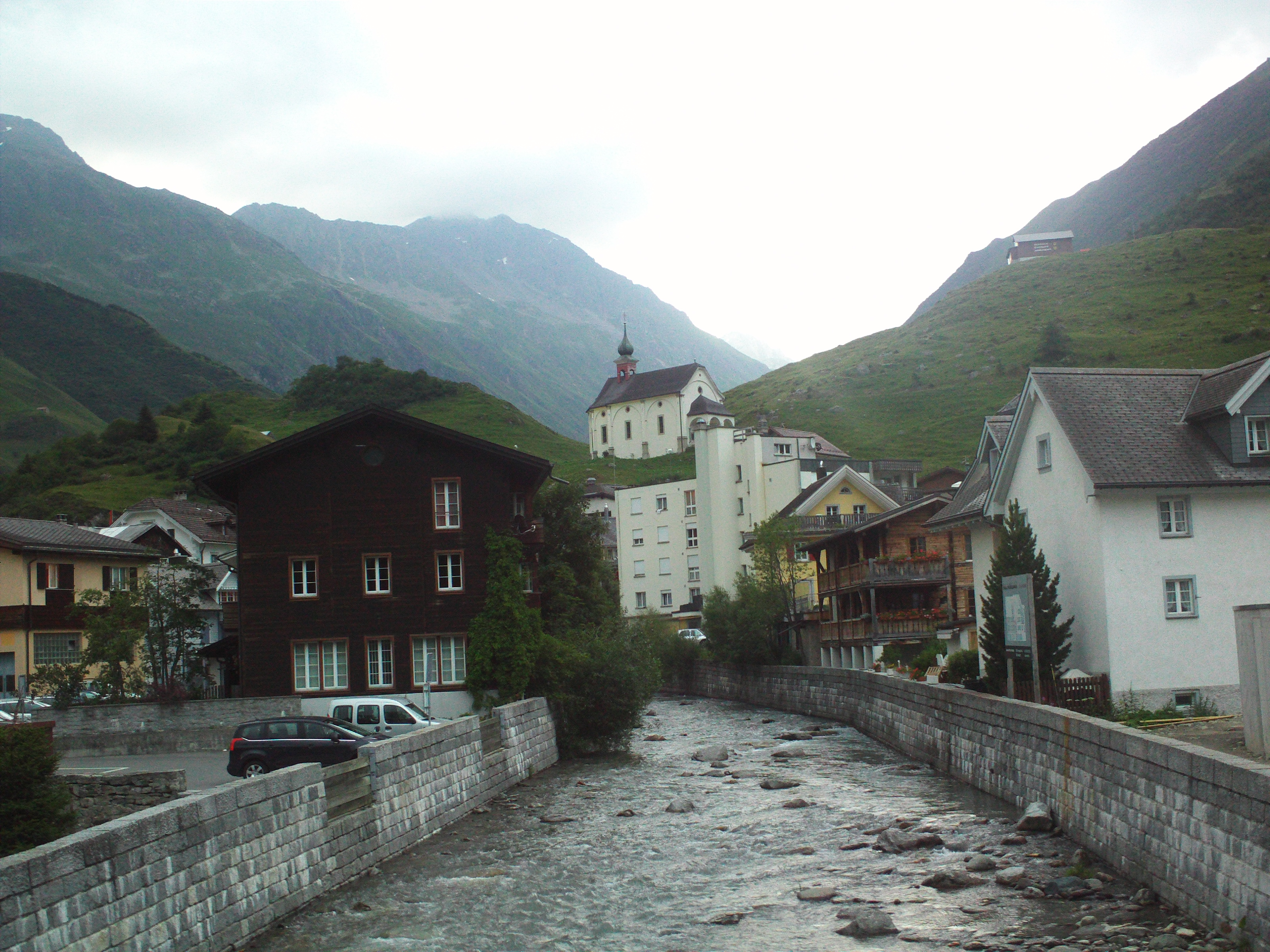
The Unteralpreuss flowing through Andermatt

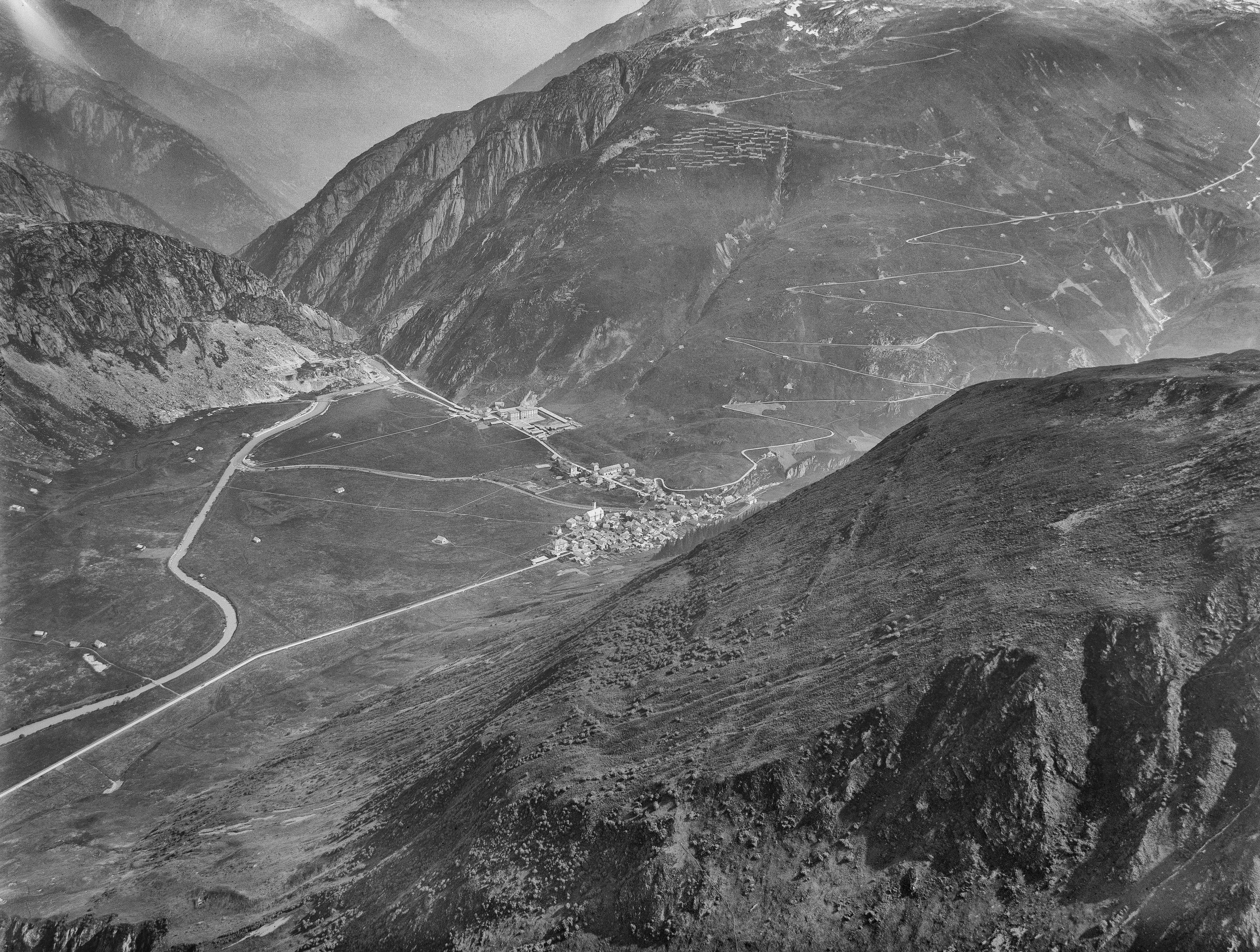
Andermatt by Eduard Spelterini, ca. 1903
