= Winter of Terror =

Natural disaster in Switzerland, Austria, Italy and Liechtenstein

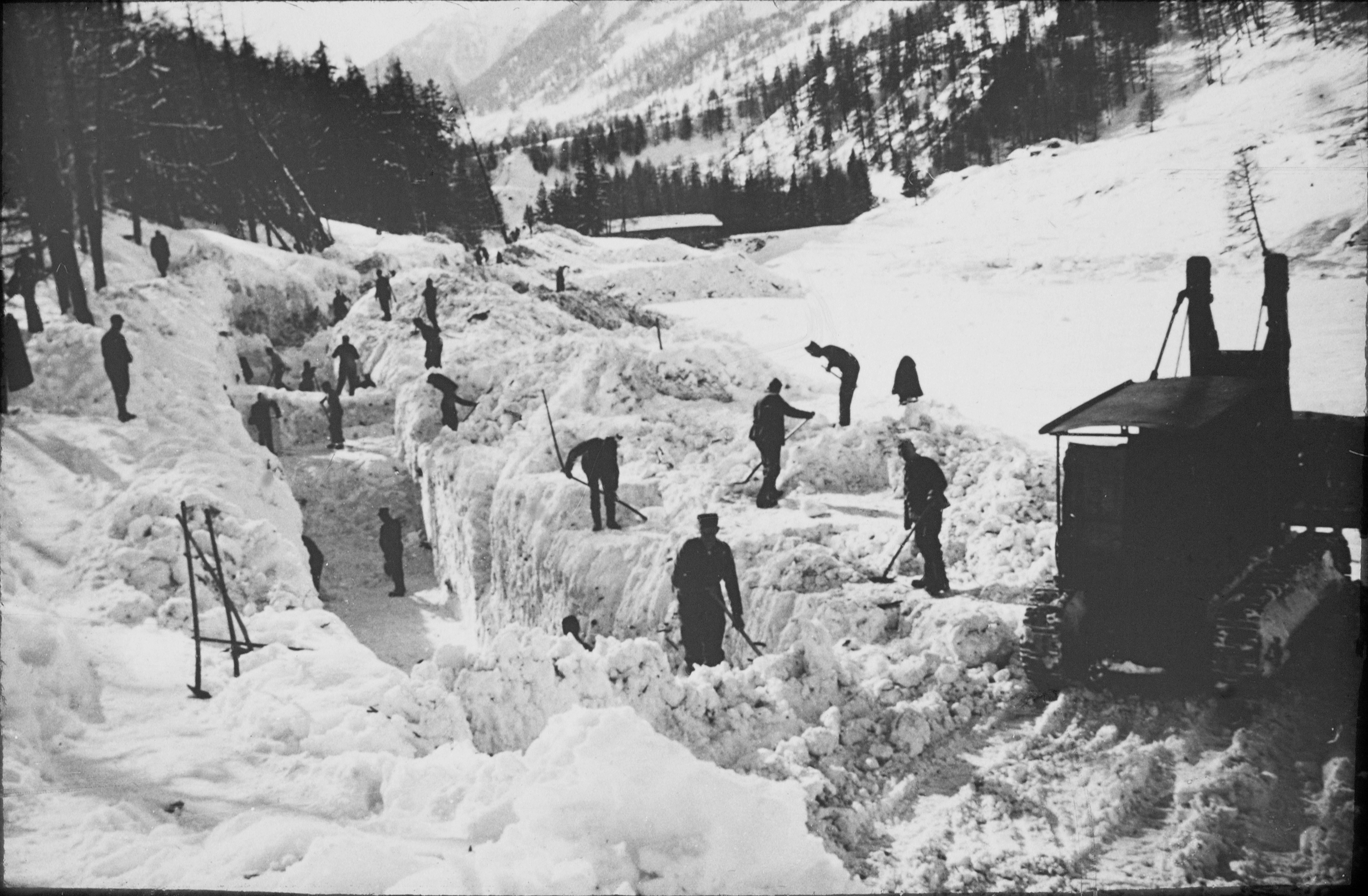
Clearing the road from Zernez to Brail

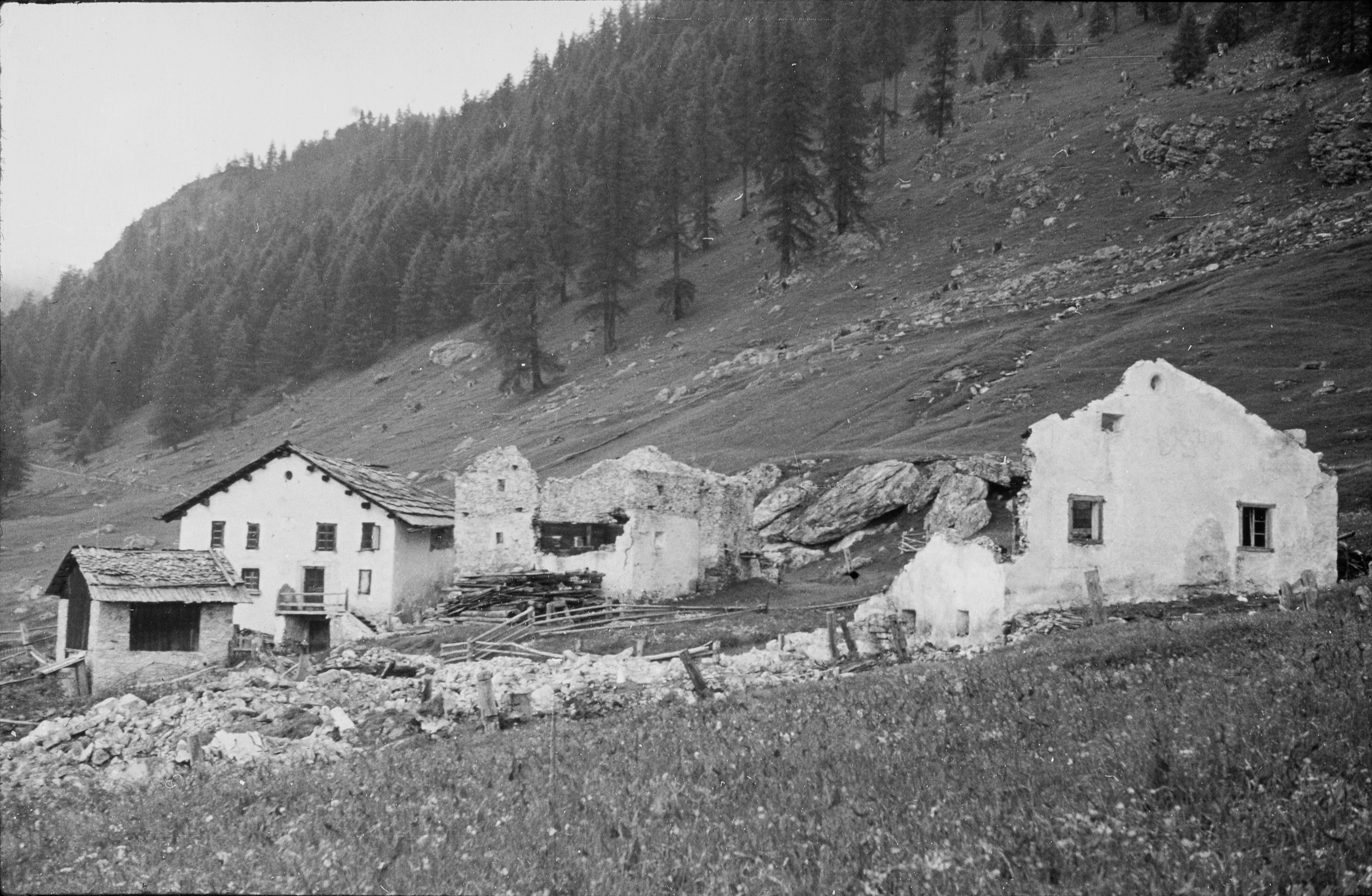
Ruined hamlet Lü Daint in the Val Müstair

The Winter of Terror was a three-month period during the winter of 1950–1951 during which an unprecedented number of avalanches took place in the Alps in Switzerland, Austria and Italy. The series of 649 avalanches killed over 265 people and caused large amounts of damage to residential and other human-made structures.

== Damage and casualties ==
Austria suffered the most damage and loss of human life with 135 killed and many villages destroyed. Thousands of acres of economically valuable forest in both Austria and Switzerland, were also damaged during the period.

The Valais canton of Switzerland suffered 92 human deaths, approximately 500 cattle deaths, and destruction of 900 human-made structures. As in Austria, economically important forests were also damaged during the period.

The Swiss town of Andermatt in the Adula Alps was hit by six avalanches within a 60-minute period, resulting in 13 deaths.

== Causes ==
The period is thought to have been the result of atypical weather conditions in the Alps: high precipitation due to the meeting of an Atlantic warm front with a polar cold front resulted in 3–4.5 metres of snow being deposited in a two- to three-day period. More than 600 buildings were destroyed and over 40,000 people were buried under snow.
