= Teurihorn =

Mountain in Switzerland

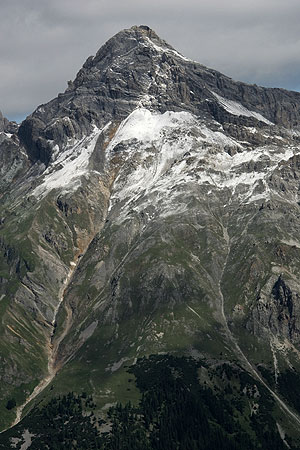
- View from the south side

Highest point
- Elevation: 2,973 m (9,754 ft)
- Prominence: 195 m (640 ft)
- Parent peak: Steilerhorn
- Coordinates: 46°34′33.5″N 9°19′07.5″E

Geography
- Location within Switzerland
- Location: Graubünden, Switzerland
- Parent range: Lepontine Alps

The Teurihorn is a mountain of the Swiss Lepontine Alps, overlooking Splügen in the canton of Graubünden. It is located between the valleys of the Stutzbach and the Steilerbach, south of the Alperschällihorn.
