= Cima de Pian Guarnei =

Mountain in Switzerland

- Pizzo Quadro
- Location within Alps

Highest point
- Elevation: 3,015 m (9,892 ft)
- Prominence: 100 m (330 ft)
- Parent peak: Piz Corbet
- Coordinates: 46°23′10″N 9°17′03.5″E

Geography
- Location: Lombardy, Italy/Graubünden, Switzerland
- Parent range: Lepontine Alps

The Cima di Pian Guarnei (also known as Pizzo Quadro) is a mountain of the Lepontine Alps on the Swiss-Italian border.
