= Pizzo di Claro =

Mountain in Switzerland

- Visagno
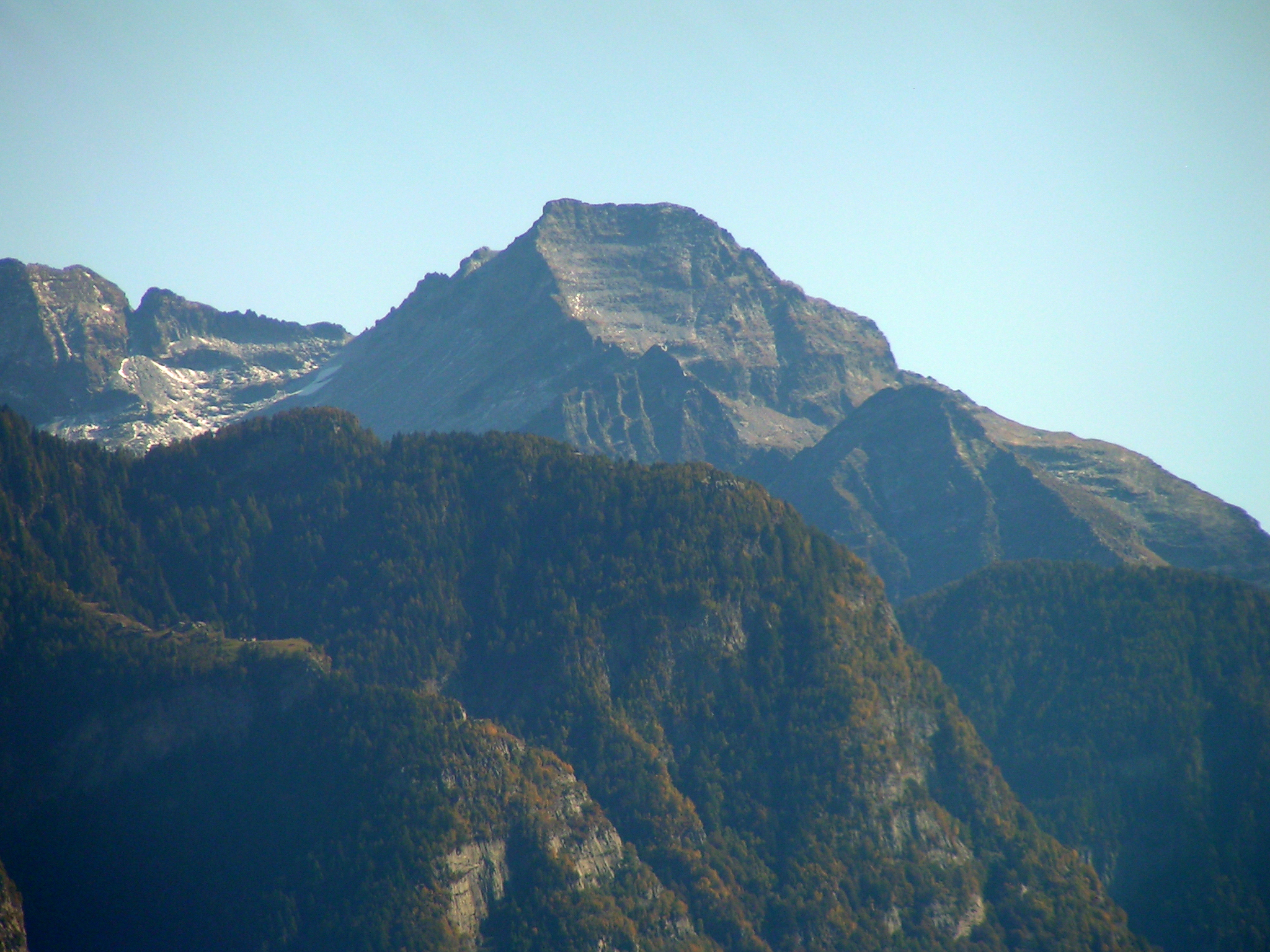
- The north-west face

Highest point
- Elevation: 2,727 m (8,947 ft)
- Prominence: 361 m (1,184 ft)
- Parent peak: Torent Alto
- Coordinates: 46°17′46.1″N 9°03′20.4″E

Geography
- Location within Switzerland Location within Canton of Grisons Location within Canton of Ticino
- Country: Switzerland
- Cantons: Grisons and Ticino
- Parent range: Lepontine Alps

Pizzo di Claro, also known as Visagno, is a 2,727 metres (8,947 ft) high mountain of the Lepontine Alps, located on the border between the Swiss cantons of Ticino and Grisons (Graubünden). It overlooks Claro on its western side, although Cresciano is closer. On its eastern side it overlooks the valley of Calanca near Arvigo (Grisons). A small lake, Lago Canee, lies west of the summit at 2,198 metres (7,211 ft).

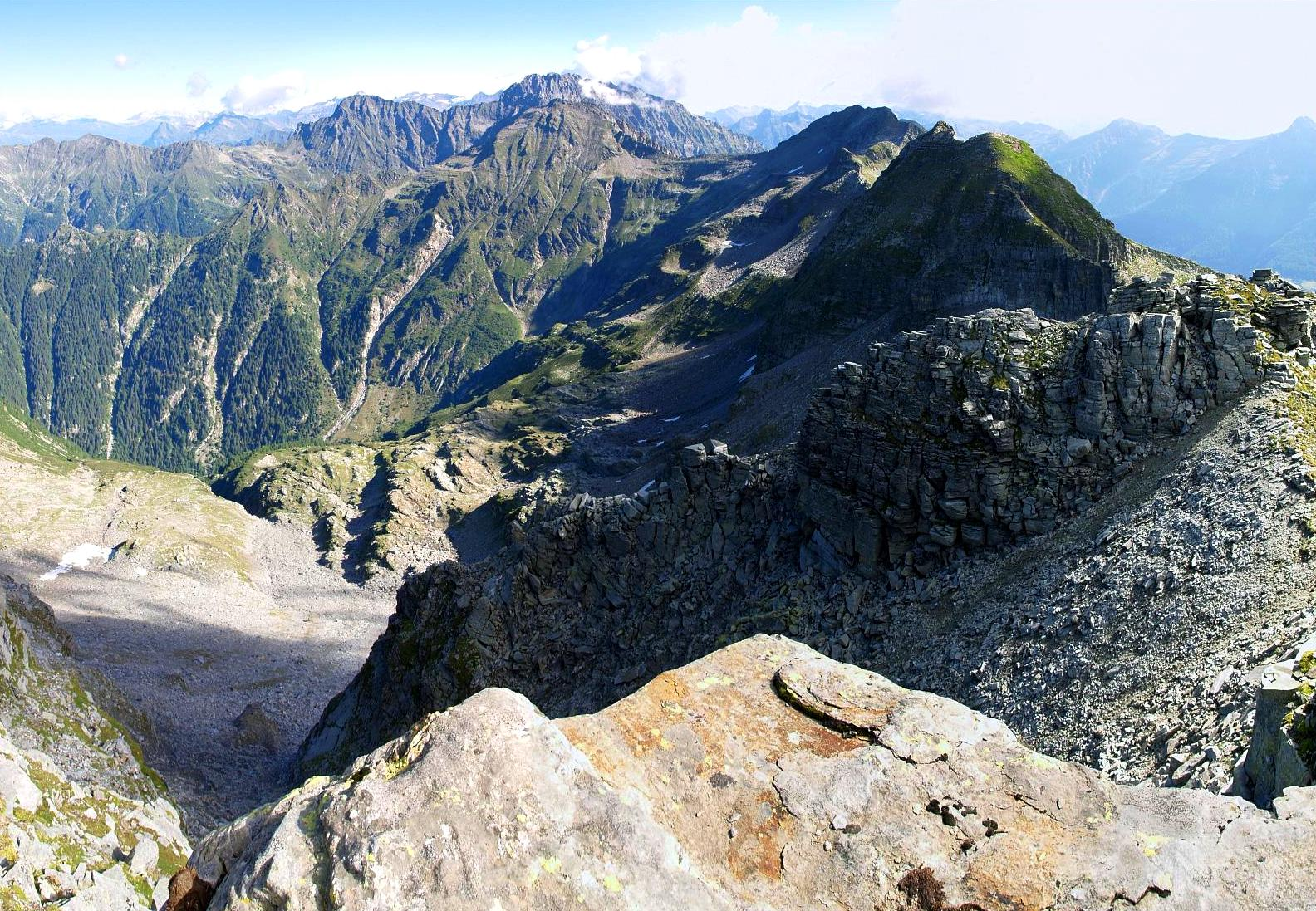
View from the summit towards the north

Marked trails lead to the summit from both sides, the shortest route starting from above Arvigo.
