= Steilerhorn =

Mountain in Switzerland

- Location within Switzerland

Highest point
- Elevation: 2,980 m (9,780 ft)
- Prominence: 218 m (715 ft)
- Parent peak: Alperschällihorn
- Coordinates: 46°35′2″N 9°18′58″E

Geography
- Location: Graubünden, Switzerland
- Parent range: Lepontine Alps

The Steilerhorn is a mountain of the Swiss Lepontine Alps, located north of Splügen in the canton of Graubünden. It lies between the valleys of the Stutzbach and the Steilerbach, south of the Alperschällihorn.
