= Piz de la Lumbreida =

Mountain in Switzerland

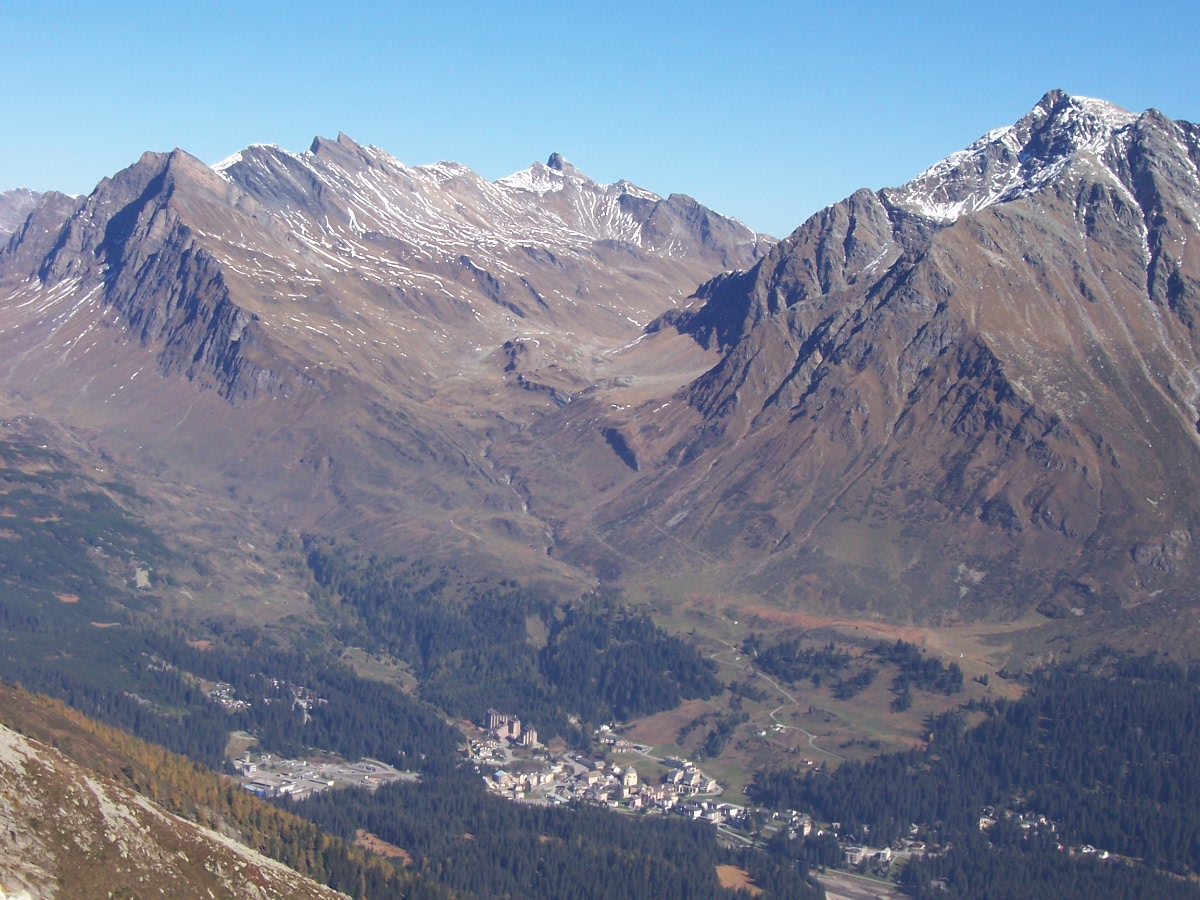
- San Bernardino and Piz de la Lumbreida (right)

Highest point
- Elevation: 2,983 m (9,787 ft)
- Prominence: 563 m (1,847 ft)
- Parent peak: Pizzo Tambo
- Coordinates: 46°28′52″N 9°13′31″E

Geography
- Location within Switzerland
- Location: Graubünden, Switzerland
- Parent range: Lepontine Alps

Piz de la Lumbreida is a mountain of the Lepontine Alps, overlooking San Bernardino in the canton of Graubünden.
