= Piz Uffiern (Tujetsch) =

Mountain in Switzerland

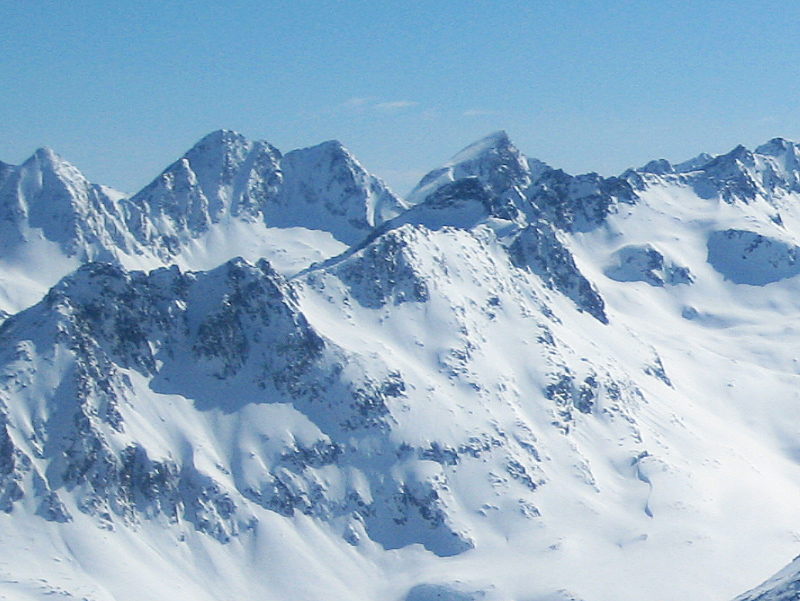
- Piz Uffiern (centre-left) and Piz Blas (right) from the west

Highest point
- Elevation: 3,013 m (9,885 ft)
- Prominence: 196 m (643 ft)
- Parent peak: Piz Blas
- Coordinates: 46°35′03″N 8°43′52″E

Geography
- Location within Switzerland
- Location: Graubünden, Switzerland
- Parent range: Lepontine Alps

Piz Uffiern is a mountain of the Lepontine Alps, located between the valleys of Curnera and Nalps, in the canton of Graubünden. It lies north of Piz Blas, where runs the border with the canton of Ticino.
