= Pizzo Cavregasco =

Mountain in Italy

Coordinates: 46°14′25″N 9°16′32″E

Highest point
- Elevation: 2,535 m (8,317 ft)
- Prominence: 334 m (1,096 ft)

Geography
- Location: Lombardy, Italy

Pizzo Cavregasco is a mountain of Lombardy, Italy. It has an elevation of 2,535 metres.
