= Constantinos Carydis =

Greek conductor

Constantinos Carydis (Greek: Κωνσταντίνος Καρύδης) is a Greek conductor, born in Athens in 1974 and active in both the symphonic and operatic repertories. He won the 2011 Carlos Kleiber Prize, bestowed by the Bavarian State Opera in Munich, with Kent Nagano and Mariss Jansons among the judges.

His accomplishments to date include Gluck's Alceste at Stuttgart in 2006 and Mozart's Die Entführung aus dem Serail in Amsterdam in 2008, both of which have been released on DVD.

In orchestral music, Carydis is noted for his reading of Falla's complete Three-Cornered Hat ballet and for Rimsky-Korsakov's coloristic Scheherazade.

After regular engagements at Munich's Gärtnerplatztheater, and after leading Mozart's Don Giovanni at the Vienna State Opera in 2009, he débuted at the Royal Opera in London, leading an innovative "3D" production of Bizet's Carmen, which was later issued as a DVD. Carydis returned to the British company in 2012 for twelve performances of Don Giovanni. His interpretation of this opera has been heard in Amsterdam as well.

In Munich, Carydis conducted an acclaimed new staging in 2011 of Offenbach's Les contes d'Hoffmann starring Diana Damrau and Rolando Villazón. This was streamed over the Internet. He has also performed with the Munich Philharmonic.

The conductor makes his début at the Edinburgh International Festival in 2013 and conducted Wagner's Tristan und Isolde for Frankfurt Opera in 2014, as well as concerts with the Bavarian State Orchestra.

On 13 June 2019, Carydis made his conducting debut with the Berliner Philharmoniker at its renowned hall. The programme began and ended with Mozart’s Symphonies No. 34 and 38 respectively, in which tonal radiance is combined with delicate expressive nuances. We also hear works by Dmitri Shostakovich, including his Chamber Symphony op. 110a, which sensitively and movingly reflects the horror of war. The concert was streamed live on 15 June on the orchestra‘s Digital Concert Hall and can be seen on demand.
