= Pizzo Ferré =

Mountain in Italy

- Location within Alps

Highest point
- Elevation: 3,103 m (10,180 ft)
- Prominence: 133 m (436 ft)
- Parent peak: Piz di Pian
- Coordinates: 46°27′42″N 09°16′48″E

Geography
- Location: Lombardy, Italy (mountain partially in Switzerland)
- Parent range: Lepontine Alps

Pizzo Ferré (Italian pronunciation: [ˈpittso ferˈre]; 3,103 m) is a mountain of the Lepontine Alps, located west of Isola in the Italian region of Lombardy. The Swiss border runs 140 metres west of the summit at approximately 3,040 m.

On the north side lies a glacier named Ghiacciaio del Pizzo Ferré.
