= Piz Corbet =

Mountain

- Pizzo Sevino
- Location within Alps

Highest point
- Elevation: 3,025 m (9,925 ft)
- Prominence: 672 m (2,205 ft)
- Parent peak: Pizzo Tambò
- Listing: Alpine mountains above 3000 m
- Coordinates: 46°22′47″N 9°16′49″E

Geography
- Location: Lombardy, Italy/Graubünden, Switzerland
- Parent range: Lepontine Alps

Piz Corbet (also known as Pizzo Sevino) is a mountain of the Lepontine Alps on the Swiss-Italian border. It is situated between Mesocco and Campodolcino. On its south-eastern side lies the lake Bacino del Truzzo.
