= Lena-Lisa Wüstendörfer =

Lena-Lisa Wüstendörfer (Zurich, 1983) is a Swiss conductor and musicologist. She is the principal conductor of the Swiss Orchestra.

== Life and Work ==
Lena-Lisa Wüstendörfer grew up in Zurich. She is the daughter of actor Edzard Wüstendörfer.

Wüstendörfer studied violin and conducting at the Hochschule für Musik in Basel. Concurrently, she completed studies in musicology and economics at the University of Basel, where she wrote her doctoral thesis on Gustav Mahler. She received support from the Swiss Study Foundation, as well as the Ernst Göhner Foundation and the *Akademie Musiktheater heute* (Academy for Music Theatre Today) of the Deutsche Bank Foundation. Wüstendörfer furthered her conducting studies with Sylvia Caduff and Roger Norrington and served as an assistant conductor to Claudio Abbado.

== Conductor ==
Wüstendörfer possesses an extensive concert repertoire. Her engagements have taken her to the Lucerne Symphony Orchestra, the Zurich Chamber Orchestra, the Musikkollegium Winterthur, Camerata Schweiz, the Basel Sinfonietta, the Jura Symphony Orchestra, the Frankfurt Opera and Museum Orchestra, and the Thailand Philharmonic Orchestra, among others.

Wüstendörfer is the founder and music director of the Swiss Orchestra, which performs works by Swiss composers—such as Edouard Dupuy, Hans Huber, and Johann Carl Eschmann—throughout the country. The orchestra's goal is to build musical bridges between Switzerland's linguistic regions and to foster "a renaissance of Swiss symphonic music." Wüstendörfer is also the artistic director of the Berner Bachchor and performs internationally as a guest conductor. Since 2022, she has been director and principal conductor of the Swiss Orchestra at Andermatt Konzerthalle.

== Musicologist ==
Wüstendörfer's research focuses on the history of reception and performance, particularly regarding Gustav Mahler and Felix Weingartner. She was an assistant professor at the University of Basel's Musicology Seminar and wrote her doctoral thesis under Matthias Schmidt on the performance history of Gustav Mahler's Fourth Symphony. Her anthology *Mahler-Interpretation heute* was described by the Neue Zürcher Zeitung as a "stimulating must-read" that "ranks among the most fascinating recent publications on the reception of Mahler."
