= Cima dello Stagn =

Mountain in Switzerland

- Cima di Paina
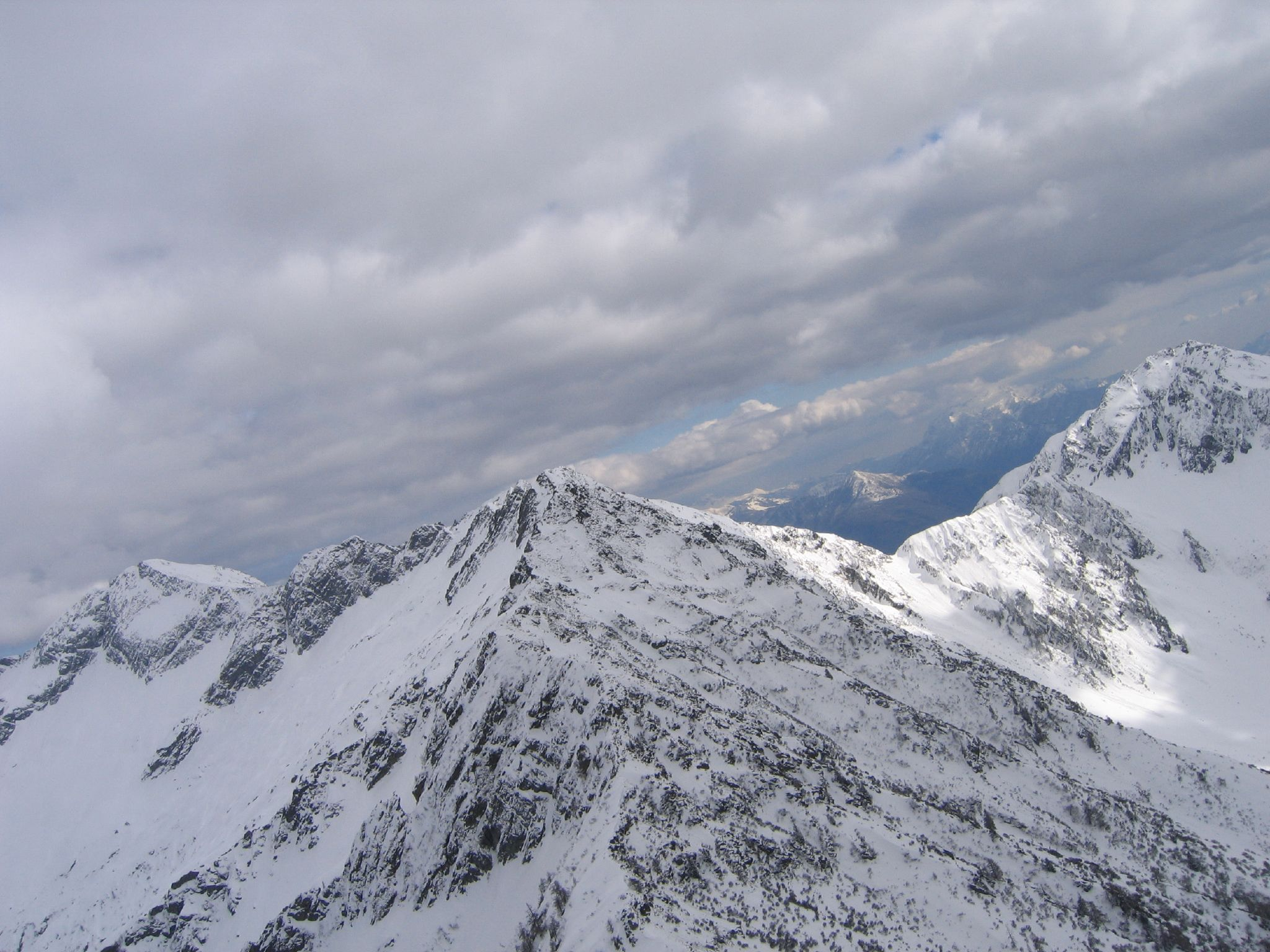
- View from the west side

Highest point
- Elevation: 2,382 m (7,815 ft)
- Coordinates: 46°12′30.2″N 9°12′8.1″E

Geography
- Location within Alps
- Location: Graubünden, Switzerland; Lombardy, Italy
- Parent range: Lepontine Alps

The Cima dello Stagn (also known as Cima di Paina) is a mountain of the Lepontine Alps, located on the border between Italy and Switzerland. It lies between Gravedona (Lombardy) and Roveredo (Graubünden).
