= Cime di Val Loga =

Mountain in Italy

Coordinates: 46°28′29″N 9°16′34″E

Highest point
- Elevation: 3,004 m (9,856 ft)

Geography
- Location: Lombardy, Italy

Cime di Val Loga is a mountain of Lombardy, Italy.

Due to the modest elevation of the climb to the watershed ridges, it is a popular destination for alpine hikers.
