= Piz di Pian =

Mountain in Switzerland

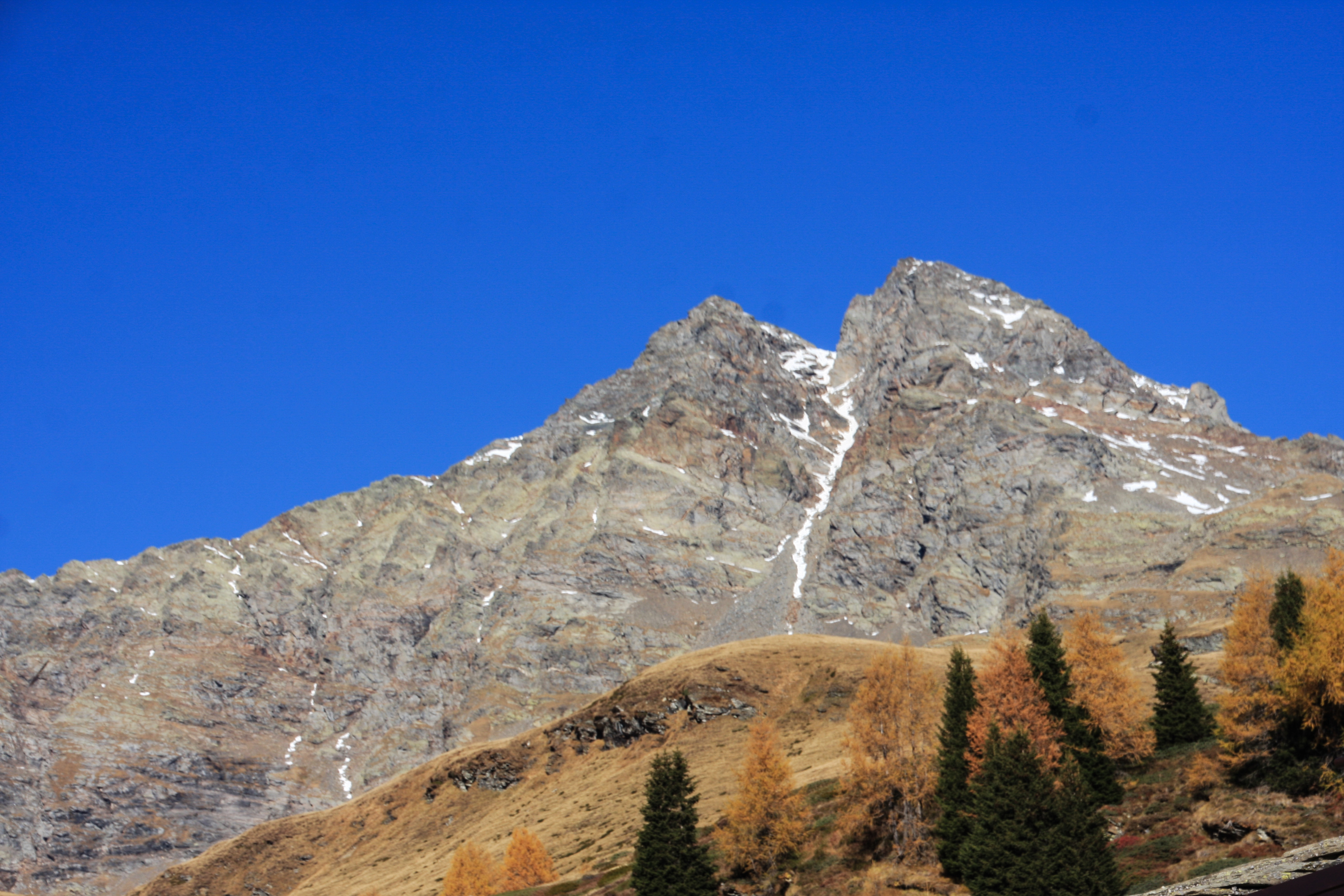

Highest point
- Elevation: 3,158 m (10,361 ft)
- Prominence: 237 m (778 ft)
- Parent peak: Pizzo Tambo
- Coordinates: 46°27′18″N 9°16′20″E

Geography
- Location within Alps
- Location: Lombardy, Italy; Graubünden, Switzerland
- Parent range: Lepontine Alps

Piz di Pian is a mountain of the Lepontine Alps on the Swiss-Italian border. With an elevation of 3,158 m (10,361 ft), it is the highest summit on the chain south of Pizzo Tambo.
