= Grauhorn =

Mountain in Switzerland

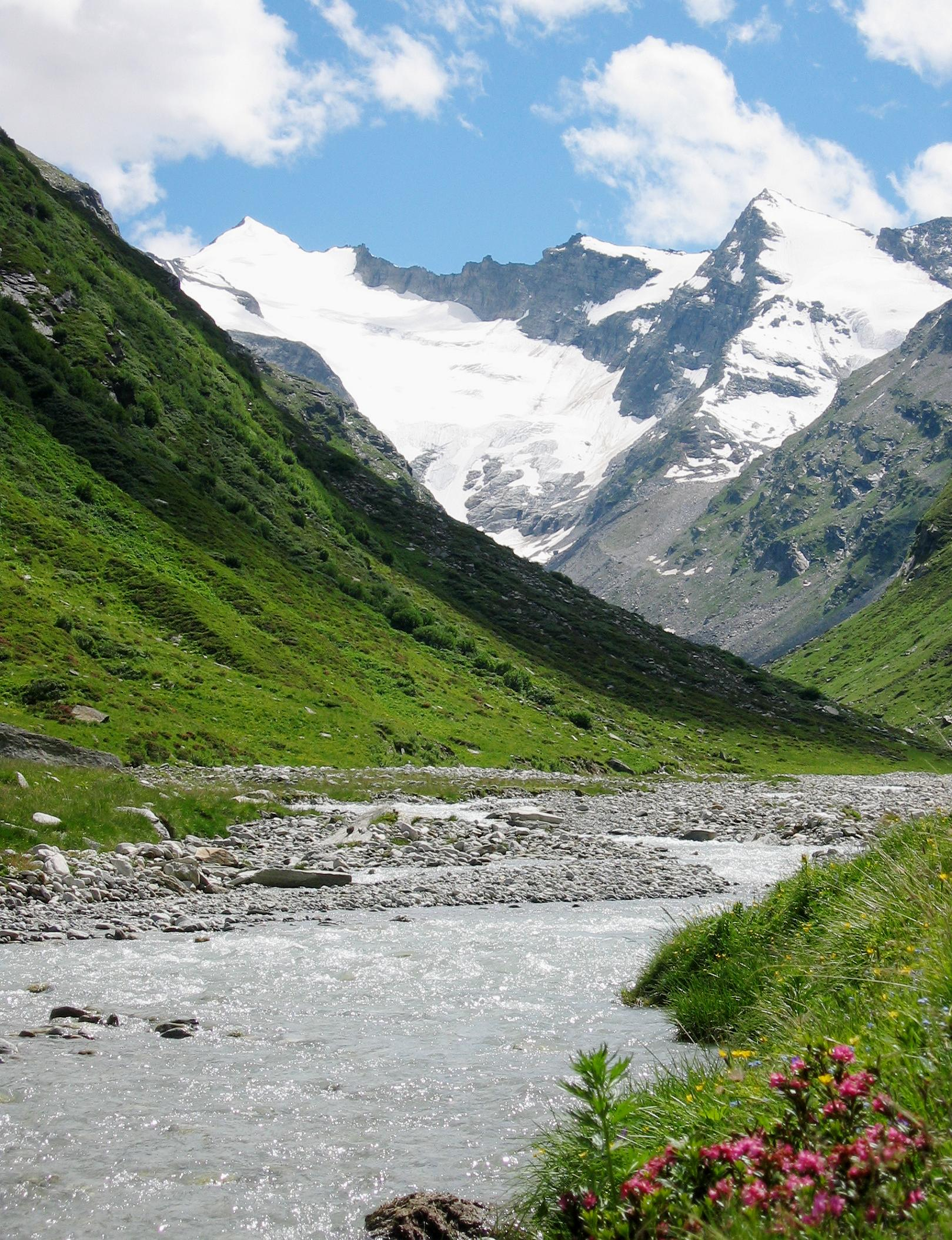
- The Rheinwaldhorn (left) and the Gruhorn (right) from the Länta valley

Highest point
- Elevation: 3,260 m (10,700 ft)
- Prominence: 105 m (344 ft)
- Parent peak: Rheinwaldhorn
- Coordinates: 46°30′18″N 9°01′41″E

Geography
- Location within Switzerland
- Location: Ticino/Graubünden, Switzerland
- Parent range: Lepontine Alps

The Grauhorn is a mountain of the Lepontine Alps, located on the border between the Swiss cantons of Ticino and Graubünden. It lies north of the Rheinwaldhorn, on the range between the Val Carassino and the Länta valley.

On the north side of the mountain is a glacier named Grauhorngletscher.
