= Torent Alto =

Mountain in Switzerland

- Torrone Alto - Torrone d'Orza
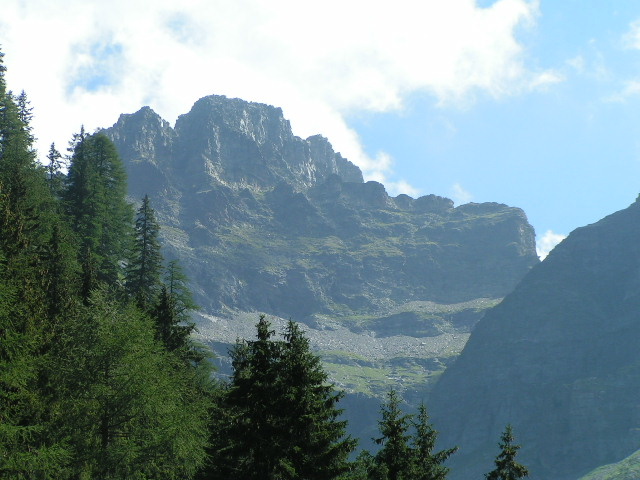
- The west face

Highest point
- Elevation: 2,952 m (9,685 ft)
- Prominence: 835 m (2,740 ft)
- Parent peak: Rheinwaldhorn
- Coordinates: 46°20′36.9″N 9°4′10.4″E

Geography
- Location within Switzerland
- Location: Ticino/Graubünden, Switzerland
- Parent range: Lepontine Alps

The Torent Alto (or Torrone Alto, Italian: "high tower", or Torrone d'Orza) is a mountain of the Swiss Lepontine Alps, located on the border between the cantons of Ticino and Graubünden. It is the highest mountain lying on the chain between Pass Giümella, east of Biasca (2,117 metres) and Bellinzona.

The Torent Alto consists of three ridges and faces. The largest is the north face, which overlooks the Val Pontirone south of Malvaglia. The smallest is the west face, which overlooks the Valle d'Osogna, east of Osogna. The east face overlooks the village of Cauco in the Calanca valley.
