= Pizzo Tambò =

Mountain on Swiss-Italian border

Pizzo Tambo
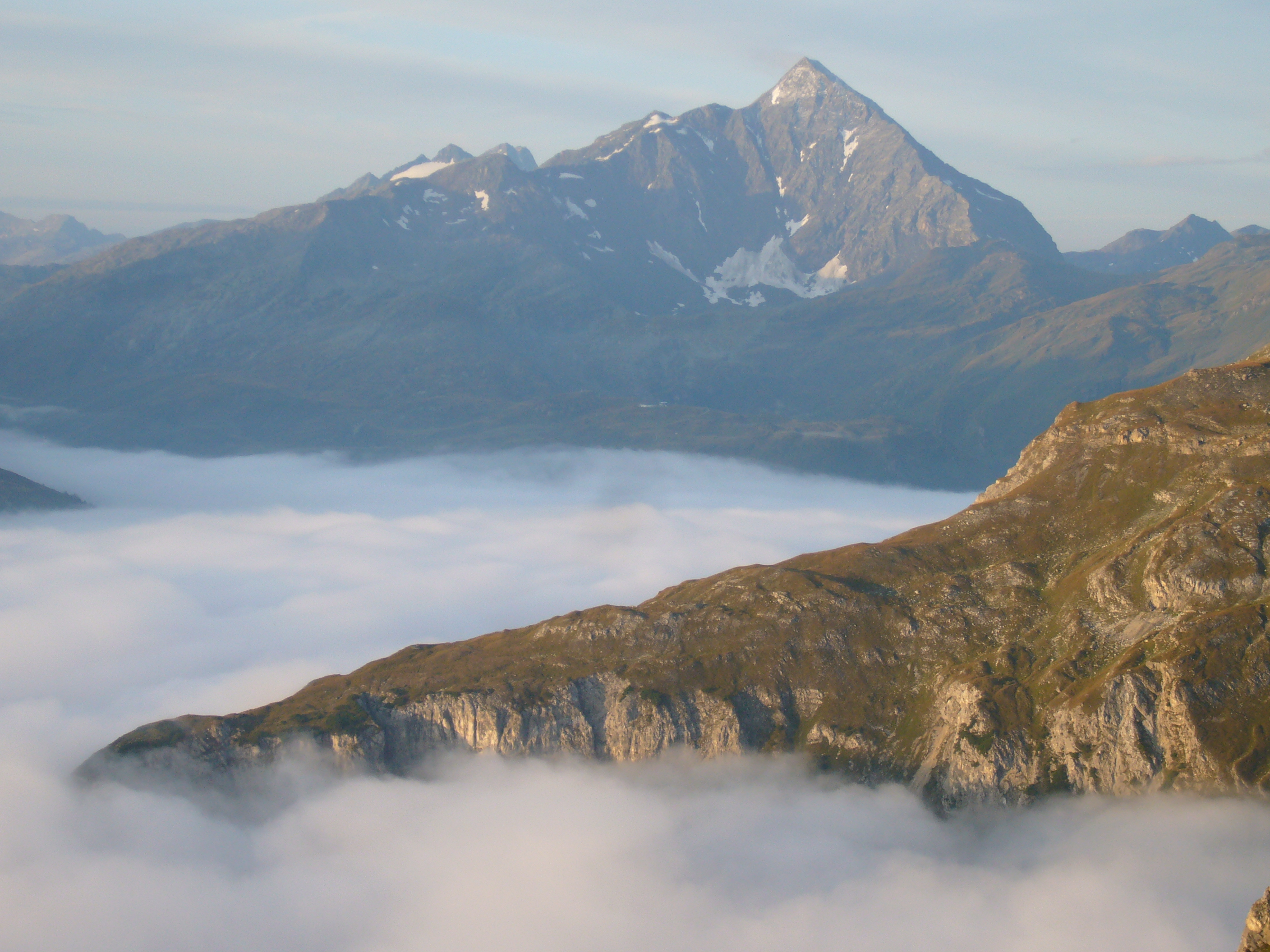
- Northeastern view of Pizzo Tambo.

Highest point
- Elevation: 3,279 m (10,758 ft)
- Prominence: 1,164 m (3,819 ft)
- Parent peak: Piz Kesch
- Isolation: 16.9 km (10.5 mi)
- Listing: Alpine mountains above 3000 m
- Coordinates: 46°29′49″N 09°17′00″E

Geography
- Location within Alps
- Location: Graubünden, Switzerland; Lombardy, Italy
- Parent range: Lepontine Alps

Climbing
- First ascent: 1828 by Johann Jakob Sulzberger

Tambohorn or Pizzo Tambo [ˈpittso ˈtambo] (Swiss names) or Pizzo Tambò [ˈpittso tamˈbɔ] (used in Italy) is a mountain located at the eastern extremity of the Lepontine Alps on the Swiss-Italian border. The mountain lies on the German-Italian language border, west of the Splügen Pass which divides the Western Alps from the Eastern Alps.

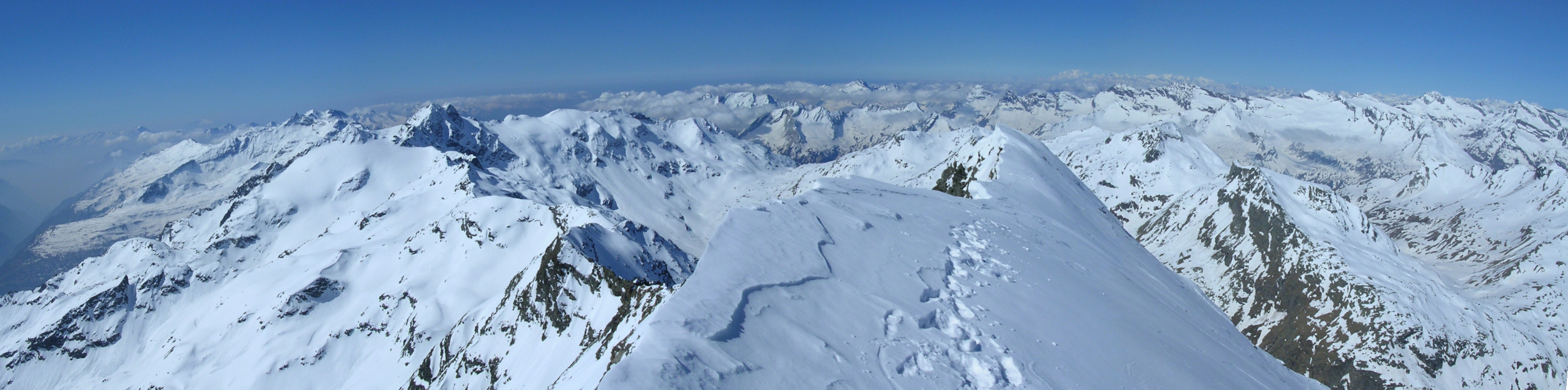
View from the summit

Reaching a height of 3,279 metres, it is the highest peak in the Mesolcina sub-chain which, starting from the Lugano Prealps northwards, ends near the Splügen Pass on the boundary between Lombardy (northern Italy) and the Graubünden canton of Switzerland.

The Tambo is composed mostly of metamorphic rock such as gneiss, mica-schist and phyllite, with a small layer of dolomite just under the peak. It includes three small glaciers, the severally shrunk Tambogletscher on the northeast flank and the Ghiacciaio del Tambo on the west flank, both on the Swiss side, and the by now larger Vedretta della Spianata (3,000-2,740 m) on the southeast side in Italy. Southwards the massif continues with a series of smaller peaks (the highest being the Pizzo Zoccone) before joining the Pizzo Ferré.

Pizzo Tamborello (2,669 m) is the name of the eastern shoulder overlooking the Splügen Pass.

== See also ==
- List of most isolated mountains of Switzerland
