= Alperschällihorn =

Mountain in Switzerland

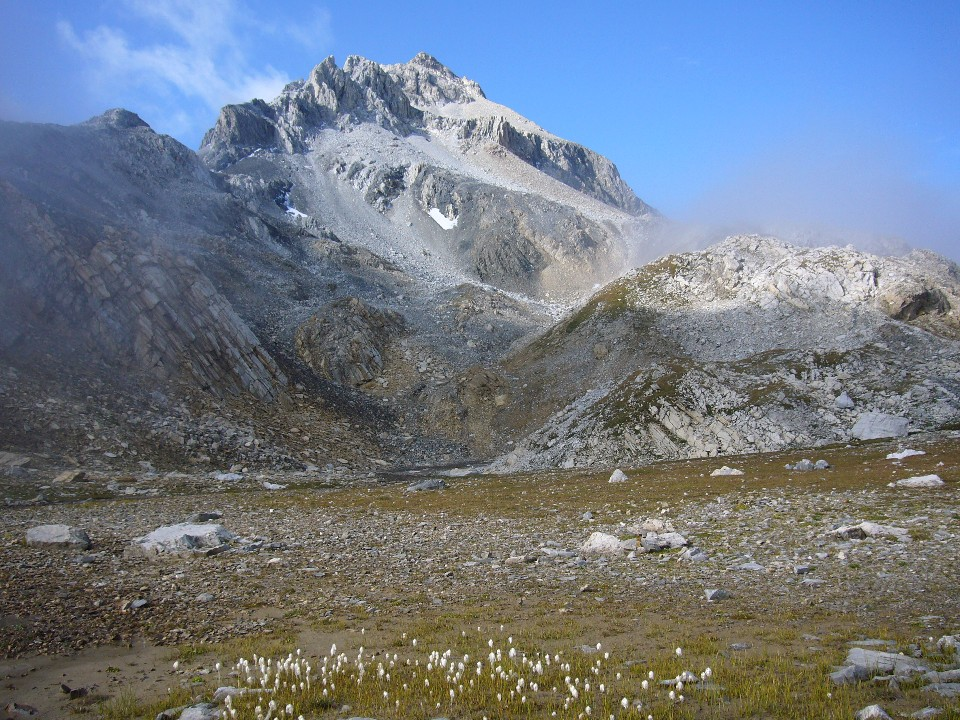
- View from the north-east side

Highest point
- Elevation: 3,039 m (9,970 ft)
- Prominence: 425 m (1,394 ft)
- Parent peak: Bruschghorn
- Listing: Alpine mountains above 3000 m
- Coordinates: 46°35′13″N 9°18′26″E

Geography
- Location within Switzerland
- Location: Graubünden, Switzerland
- Parent range: Lepontine Alps

Alperschällihorn is a mountain of the Lepontine Alps, overlooking Splügen in the canton of Graubünden. The mountains is situated between the Safien valley (north) and the Hinterrhein valley (south).
