= Mumpé Tujetsch railway station =

Swiss railway station

Mumpé Tujetsch
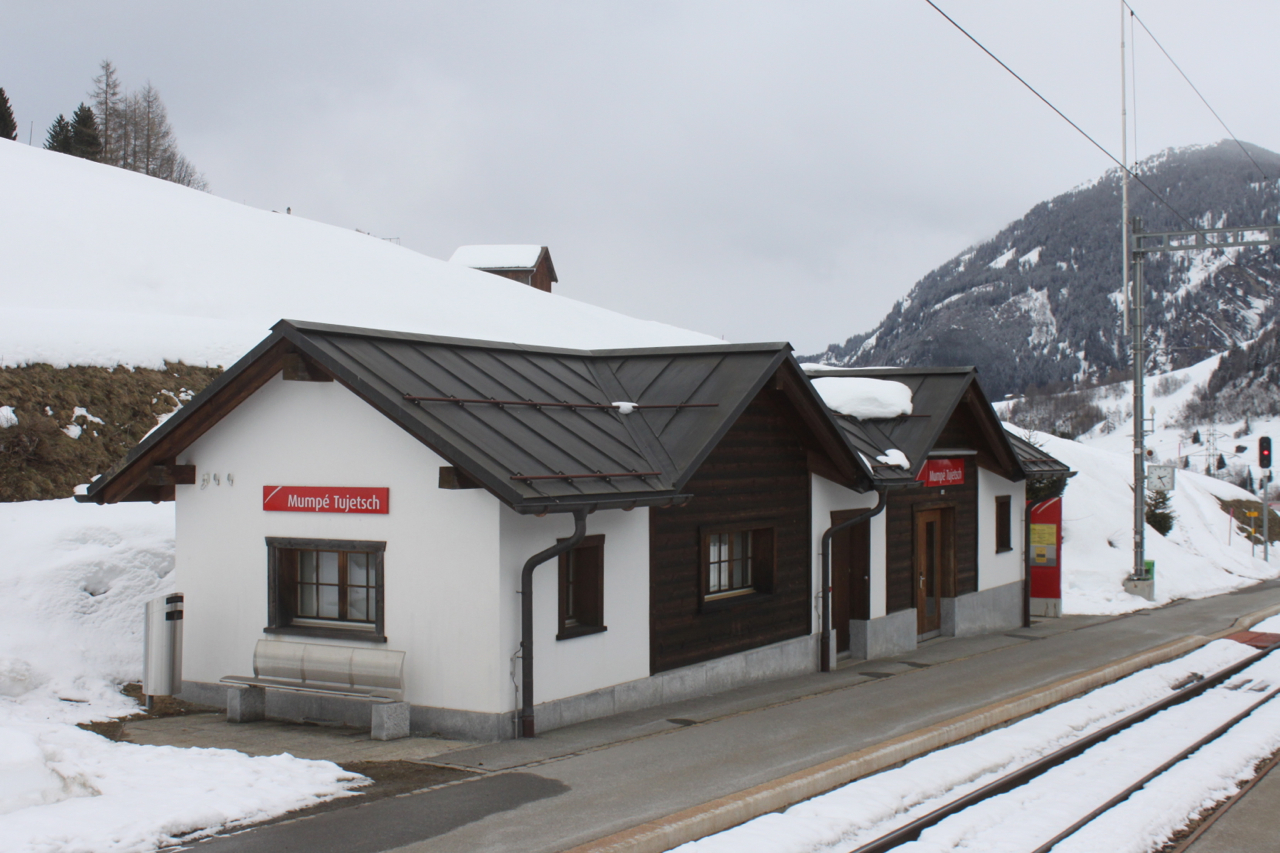
- The station in 2014

General information
- Location: Disentis/Mustér; Switzerland
- Coordinates: 46°40′55″N 8°49′26″E
- Owner: Matterhorn Gotthard Bahn
- Line: Furka Oberalp line
- Train operators: Matterhorn Gotthard Bahn

History
- Former names: Mompé Tujetsch

Services
Preceding station	Matterhorn Gotthard Bahn	Following station
Bugnei towards Andermatt	R 45	Segnas towards Disentis/Mustér
Location
- Location within Switzerland

Mumpé Tujetsch railway station (German: Bahnhof Mumpé Tujetsch) is a railway station in the municipality of Disentis/Mustér, in the Swiss canton of Grisons. It is an intermediate stop on the 1,000 mm (3 ft 3 3/8 in) gauge Furka Oberalp line of the Matterhorn Gotthard Bahn.

== Services ==
The following services stop at Mumpé Tujetsch:

- Regio: hourly service between Andermatt and Disentis/Mustér.
