= Porta Alpina =

Proposed railway station in Switzerland

Coordinates: 46°40′34″N 8°46′29″E

Planned location of Porta Alpina Sedrun portal Gotthard Base Tunnel Surselva Region

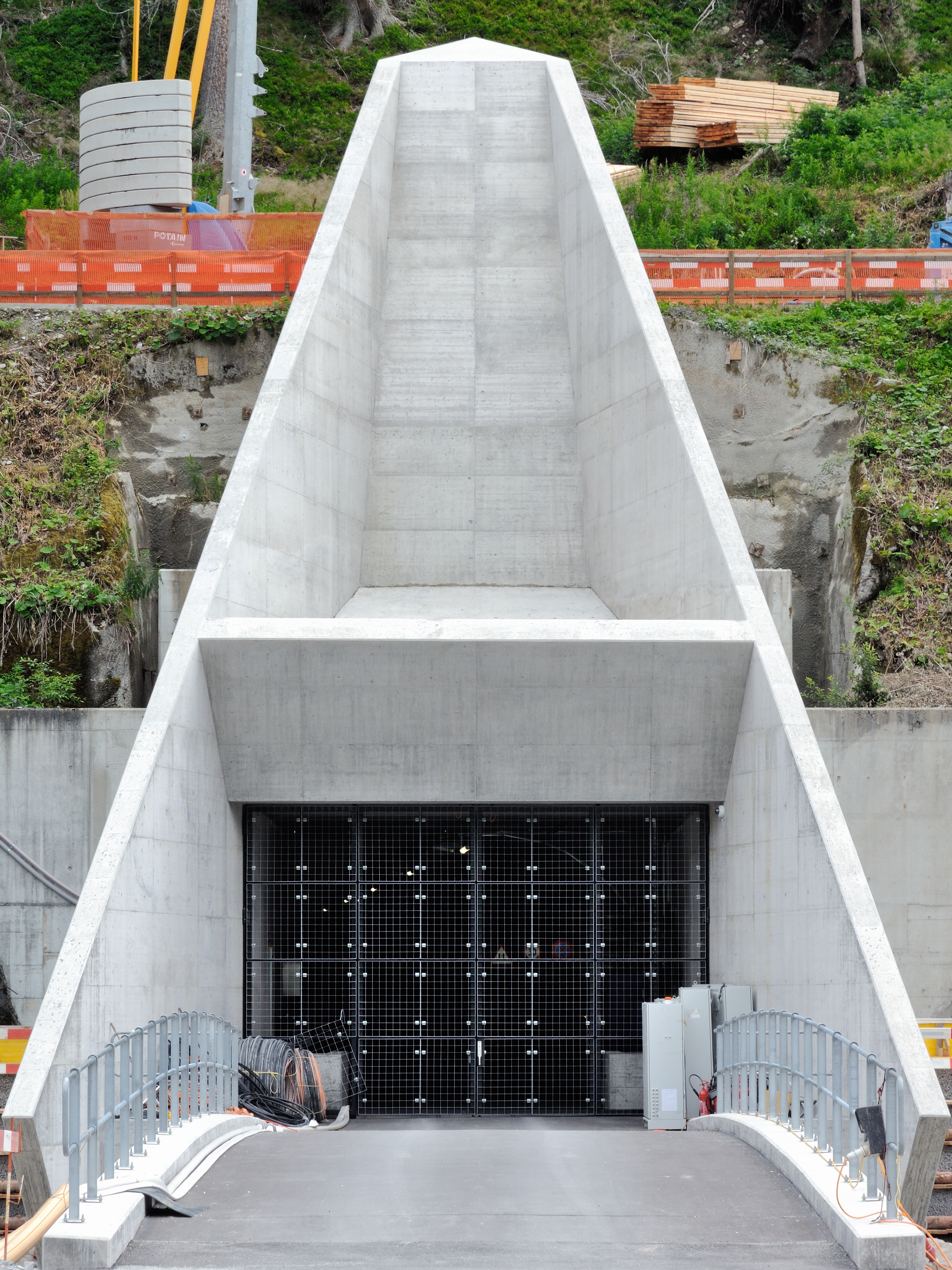
The Sedrun portal in July 2016

Porta Alpina (from Romansh: Alpine Gate) was a proposed railway station to be located in the middle of the Gotthard Base Tunnel, serving the Alpine village of Sedrun in Switzerland. It was intended to promote tourism and the economy in the canton of Graubünden.

The project was put on hold as uneconomical in 2007, and then indefinitely shelved in 2012. The current multifunction station is only used for emergency stops and maintenance. The portal lies 800 m (2,600 ft) above the tunnel.

== Design ==
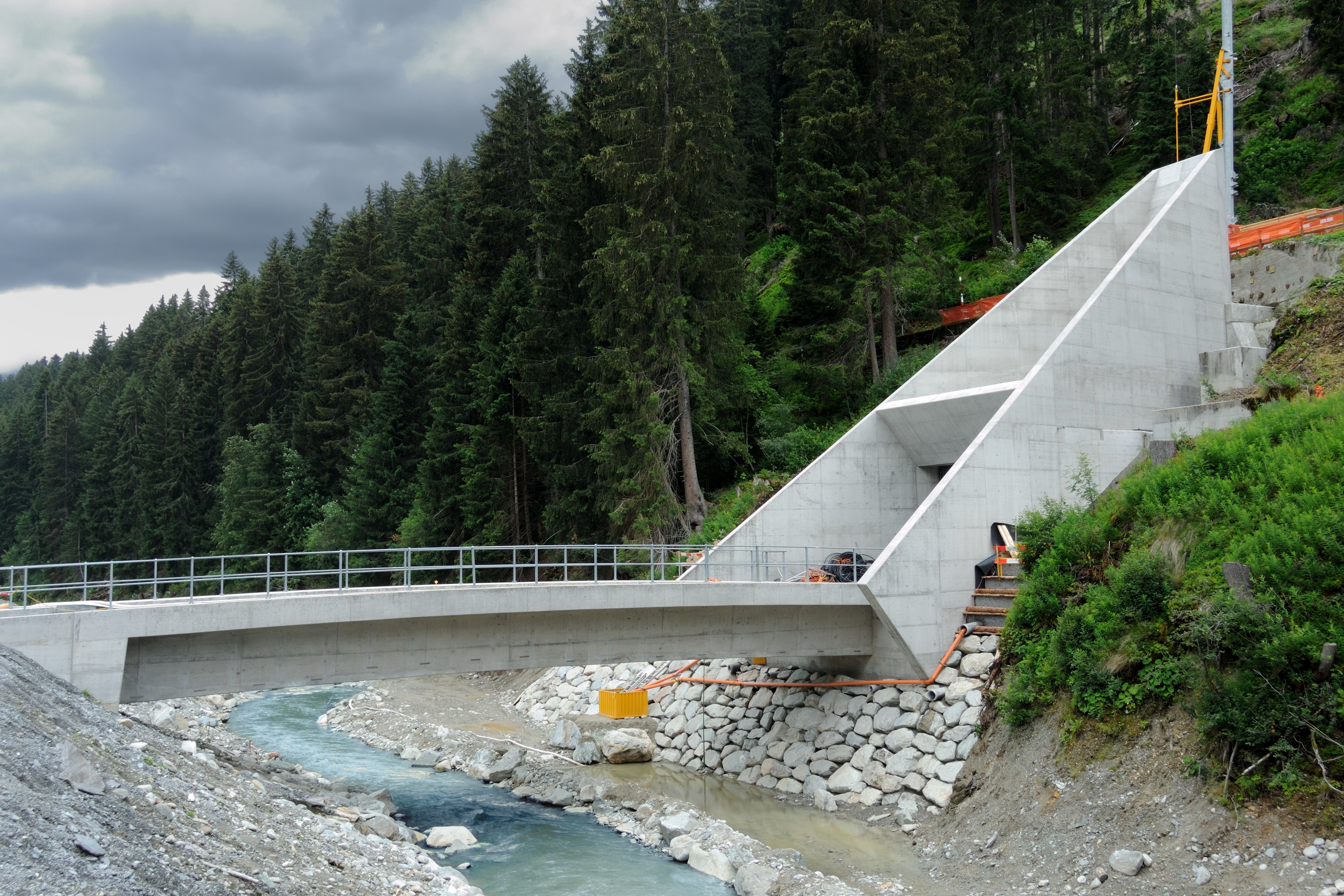
Portal over the Anterior Rhine

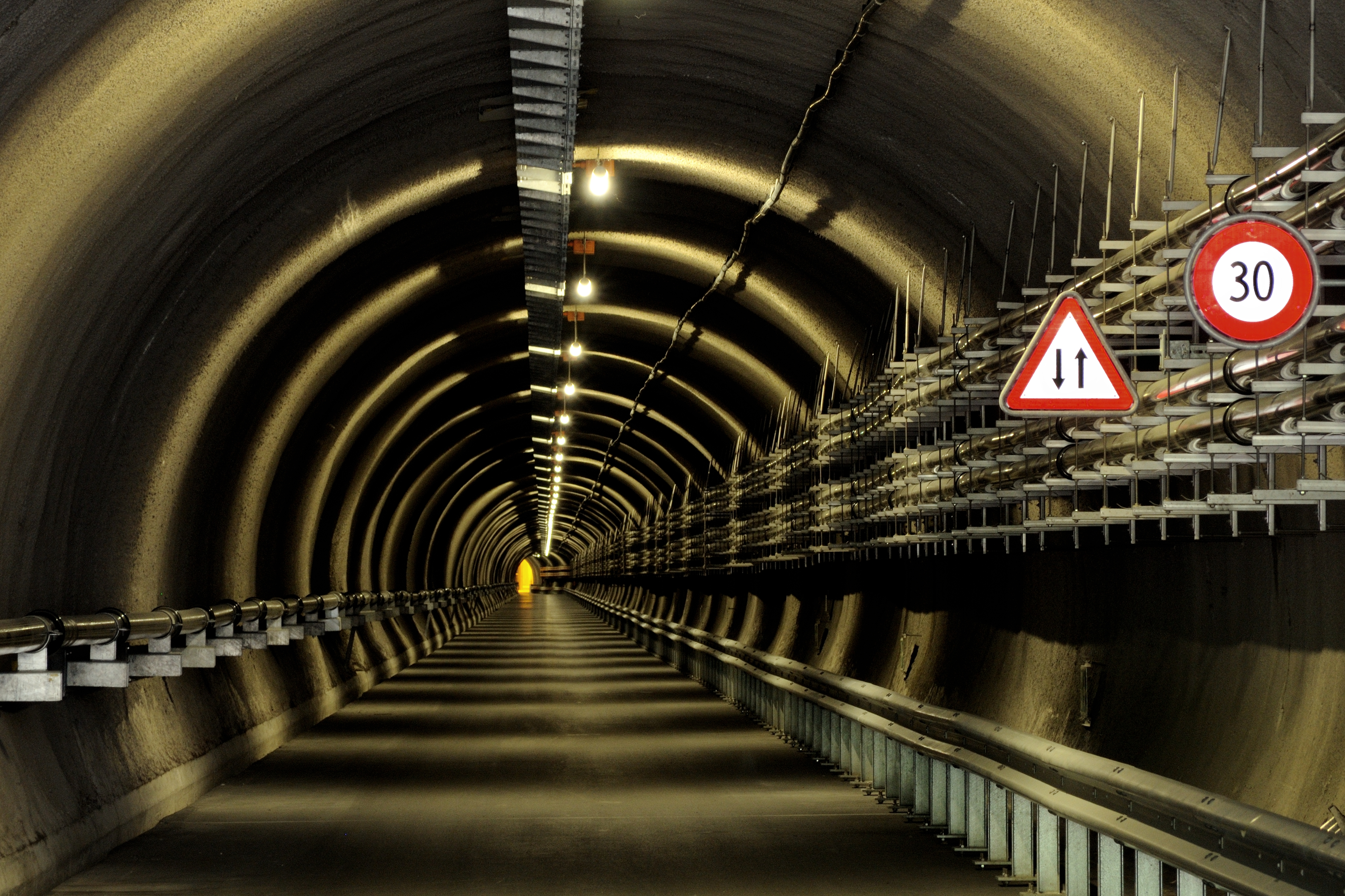
Access to the shafts

At 800 m (2,600 ft) underground, Porta Alpina would have been by far the deepest underground train station in the world, ten times as deep as the 80 m (260 ft) of the Jerusalem–Yitzhak Navon railway station (the world's deepest heavy rail station), and also surpassing Hongyancun station (Chongqing Municipality) at 116 m (381 ft) and Kyiv's Arsenalna Metro station at 105.5 m (346 ft). It would have connected the high-Alpine village of Sedrun and the Surselva district to a major high-speed line from northern to southern Europe. The current station, along with Faido, is one of the two multi-function stations of the tunnel.

The multifunction station is located near a crossover between the northbound and southbound tunnels and is linked to the surface by an elevator, using 800 m (2,600 ft) tall shafts and a 1 km (0.62 mi) long access tunnel, exiting over the Anterior Rhine, south of Sedrun. This access was used for the construction of the tunnel and is now an emergency exit of the tunnel. Construction costs for a fully functional passenger station were estimated at CHF 50M ($39M, €32M, or £22M) in 2005 with annual operating costs of CHF 2.5M. It was initially projected to be opened in 2016 after the Base Tunnel was scheduled to come into service.

== Project history ==
Proponents of Porta Alpina viewed it both as a potential tourist attraction in its own right, and as a useful transport link to assist the economically challenged Graubünden region. The station would have connected the North/South Gotthard railway line with the East/West Rhaetian Railway/Matterhorn-Gotthard Railway, which would link to the elevator by means of local buses to Sedrun station (MGB) and Disentis station (RhB). This was to have been the fastest public transport link between Zürich and the canton of Graubünden.

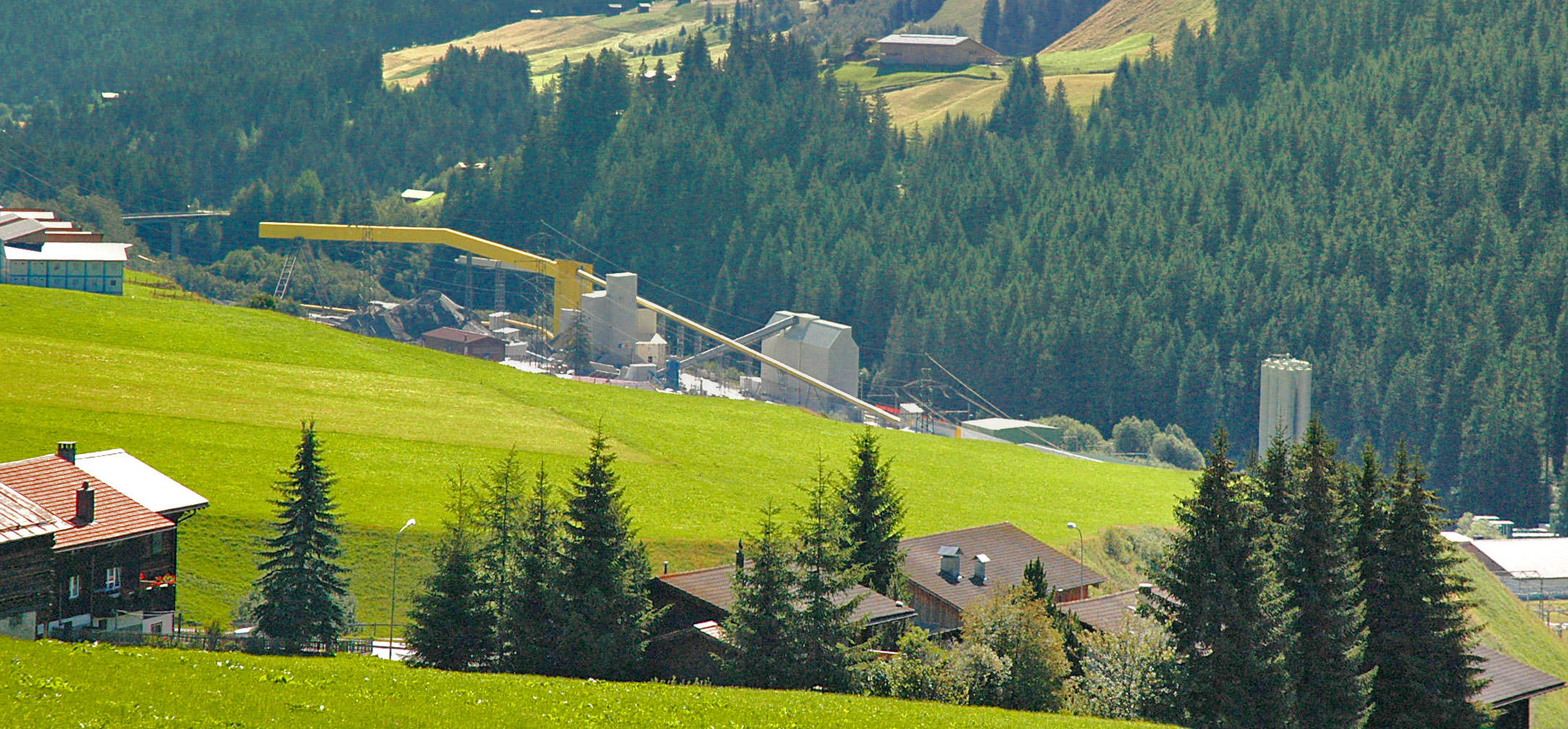
Surface works for the tunnel at Sedrun.

The project was initially positively received, and the Swiss parliament approved CHF 7.5M of startup funding in 2005. However, further studies indicated substantial problems including the questionable feasibility of the elevators, the very negative impact on tunnel rail capacity and the unprofitability of the whole enterprise. The Swiss Federal Council and the government of the canton of Graubünden announced in September 2007 that the project was put on indefinite hold.

Following renewed interest by private investors in 2012, the Federal Council decided to forgo construction for the time being, while leaving open the possibility of a similar project being implemented by a later generation. A government report stated that the Porta Alpina would have very significantly reduced the base tunnel's freight capacity (unless a dynamic passing loop were built, at a large cost for several kilometers of additional tunneling and tracks) and would have been uneconomical to operate, requiring CHF 9M of annual public subsidies.
