= Rueras railway station =

Swiss railway station

Rueras
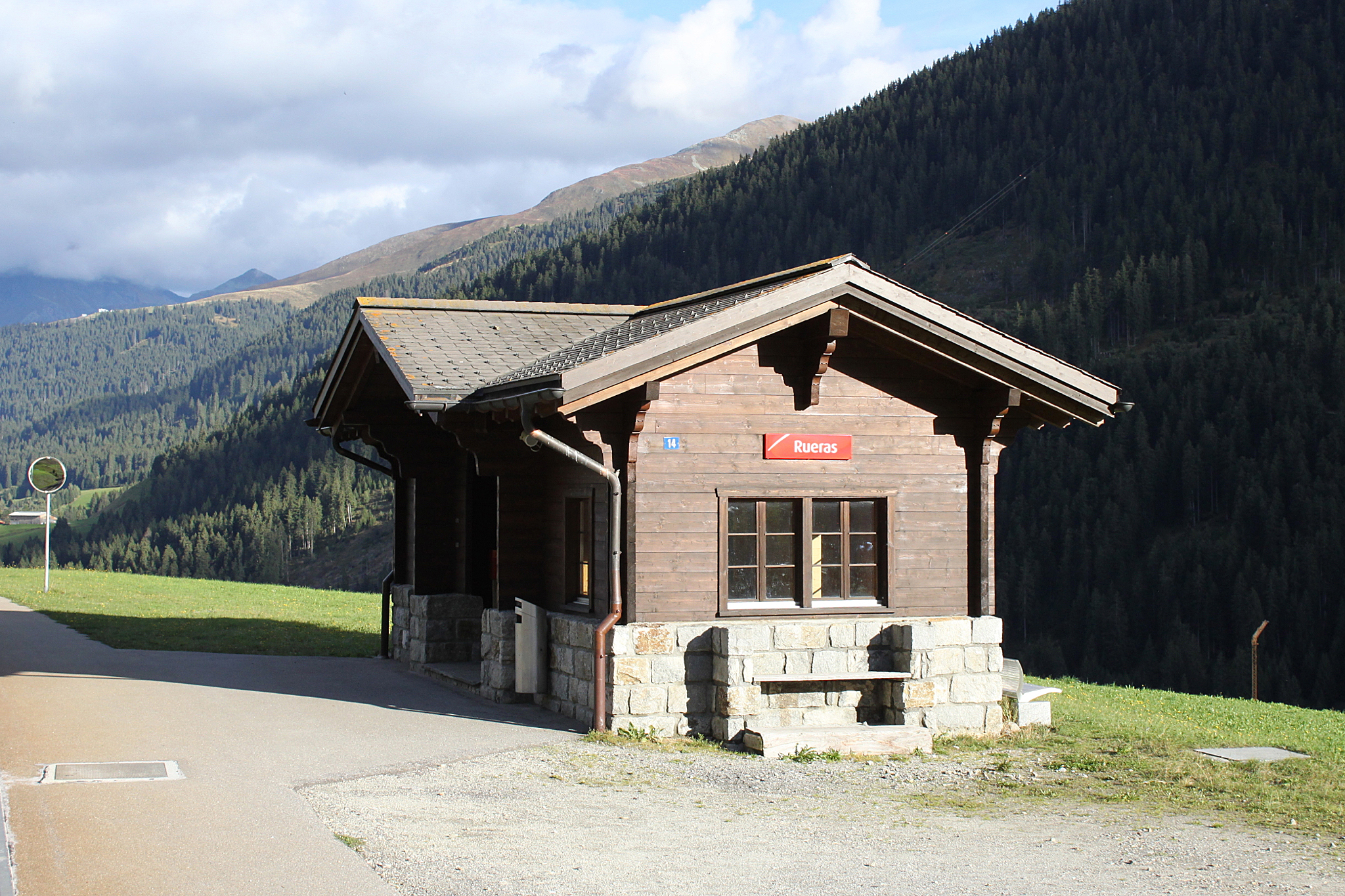
- The station in 2015

General information
- Location: Tujetsch; Switzerland
- Coordinates: 46°40′41″N 8°45′18″E
- Owner: Matterhorn Gotthard Bahn
- Line: Furka Oberalp line
- Train operators: Matterhorn Gotthard Bahn

Services
Preceding station	Matterhorn Gotthard Bahn	Following station
Dieni towards Andermatt	R 45	Sedrun towards Disentis/Mustér
Location
- Location within Switzerland

Rueras railway station (German: Bahnhof Rueras) is a railway station in the municipality of Tujetsch, in the Swiss canton of Grisons. It is an intermediate stop on the 1,000 mm (3 ft 3 3/8 in) gauge Furka Oberalp line of the Matterhorn Gotthard Bahn.

== Services ==
The following services stop at Rueras:

- Regio: hourly service between Andermatt and Disentis/Mustér.
