= Oberalppass railway station =

Swiss railway station

Oberalppass
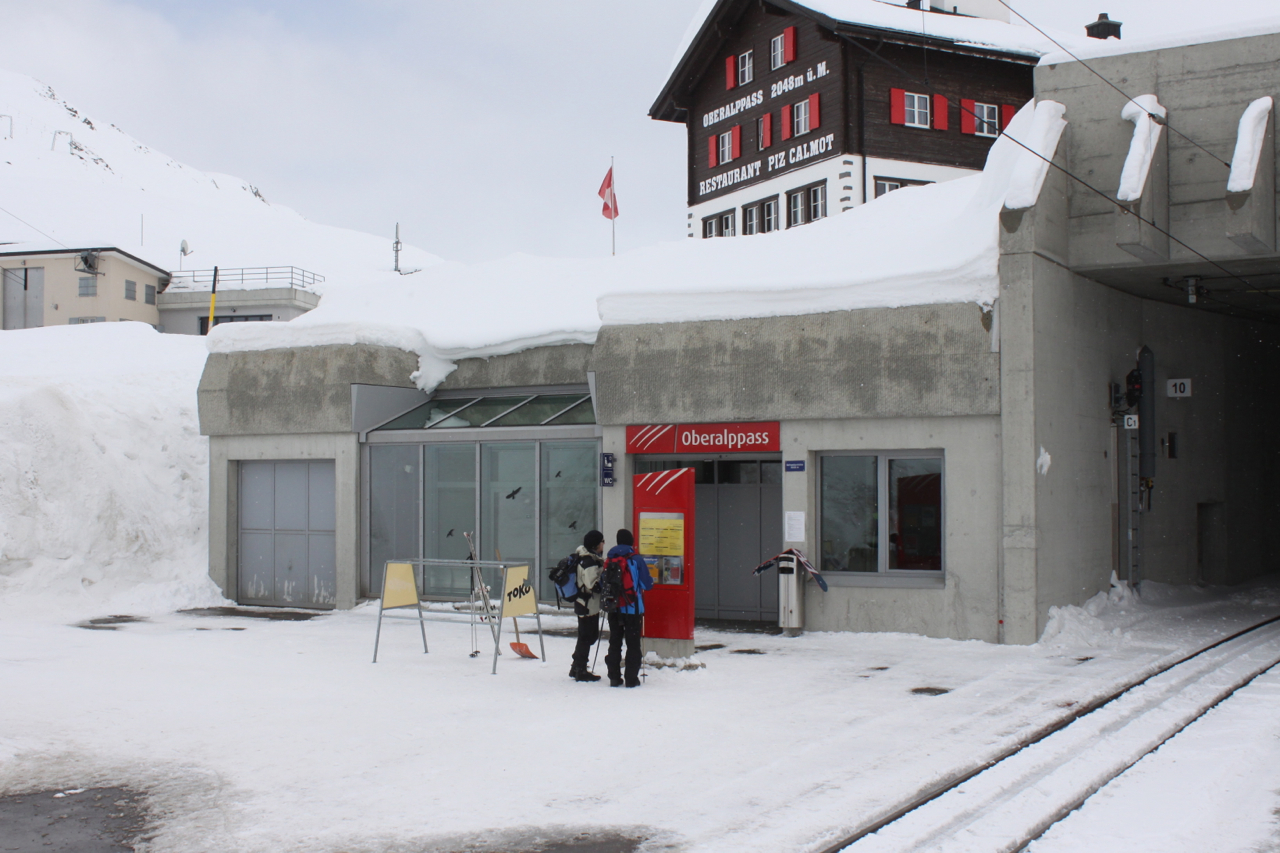
- The station in 2014

General information
- Location: Andermatt; Switzerland
- Coordinates: 46°39′36″N 8°40′16″E
- Elevation: 2,033
- Owner: Matterhorn Gotthard Bahn
- Line: Furka Oberalp line
- Train operators: Matterhorn Gotthard Bahn

Services
Preceding station	Matterhorn Gotthard Bahn	Following station
Nätschen towards Andermatt	R 45	Tschamut-Selva towards Disentis/Mustér
Location
- Location within Switzerland

Oberalppass railway station (German: Bahnhof Oberalppass) is a railway station in the municipality of Andermatt, in the Swiss canton of Uri. It is an intermediate stop on the 1,000 mm (3 ft 3 3/8 in) gauge Furka Oberalp line of the Matterhorn Gotthard Bahn. It serves the mountain location and ski area of the Oberalp Pass.

== Services ==
The following services stop at Oberalppass:

- Regio: hourly service between Andermatt and Disentis/Mustér.
