= Nätschen railway station =

Swiss railway station

Nätschen
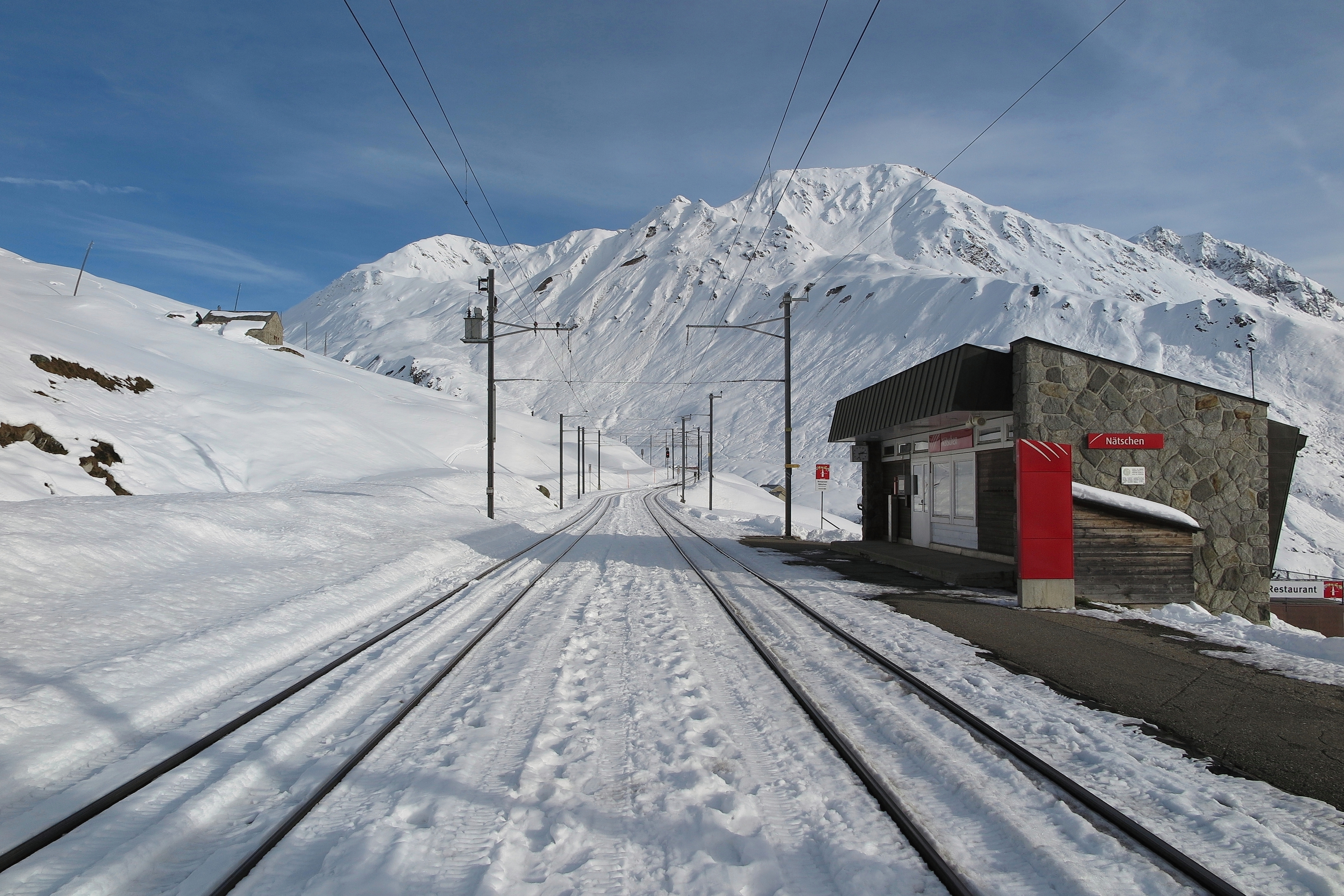
- The station in 2014

General information
- Location: Andermatt; Switzerland
- Coordinates: 46°38′32″N 8°36′35″E
- Owner: Matterhorn Gotthard Bahn
- Line: Furka Oberalp line
- Train operators: Matterhorn Gotthard Bahn

Services
| Preceding station | Matterhorn Gotthard Bahn | Following station |
|---|---|---|
| Andermatt Terminus | R 45 | Oberalppass towards Disentis/Mustér |
Location
- Location within Switzerland Location within Canton of Uri

Nätschen railway station (German: Bahnhof Nätschen) is a railway station in the municipality of Andermatt, in the Swiss canton of Uri. It is an intermediate stop on the 1,000 mm (3 ft 3 3/8 in) gauge Furka Oberalp line of the Matterhorn Gotthard Bahn. It serves the mountain location and ski area of Nätschen.

== Services ==
The following services stop at Nätschen:

- Regio: hourly service between Andermatt and Disentis/Mustér.
