= Acla da Fontauna railway station =

Swiss railway station

Acla da Fontauna
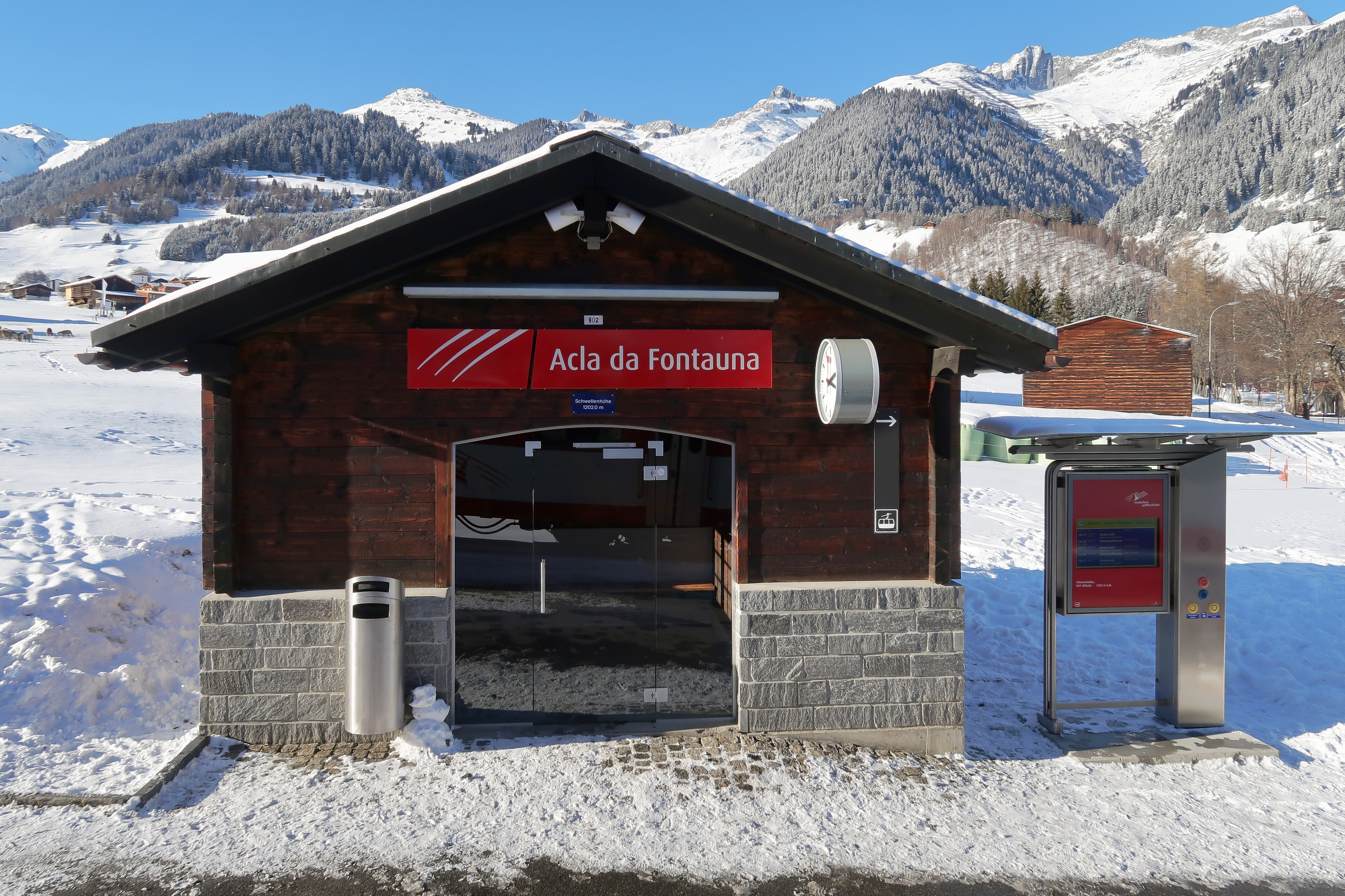
- The station in 2017

General information
- Location: Disentis/Mustér; Switzerland
- Coordinates: 46°41′49″N 8°50′46″E
- Owner: Matterhorn Gotthard Bahn
- Line: Furka Oberalp line
- Train operators: Matterhorn Gotthard Bahn

Services
Preceding station	Matterhorn Gotthard Bahn	Following station
Segnas towards Andermatt	R 45	Disentis/Mustér Terminus
Location
- Location within Switzerland

Acla da Fontauna railway station (German: Bahnhof Acla da Fontauna) is a railway station in the municipality of Disentis/Mustér, in the Swiss canton of Grisons. It is an intermediate stop on the 1,000 mm (3 ft 3 3/8 in) gauge Furka Oberalp line of the Matterhorn Gotthard Bahn.

== Services ==
The following services stop at Acla da Fontauna:

- Regio: hourly service between Andermatt and Disentis/Mustér.
