= Dieni =

Dieni may refer to:

- Federica Dieni (born 1986), Italian politician
- Dieni railway station, Tujetsch, Switzerland
