= Disentis =

Disentis/Mustér
- Municipality
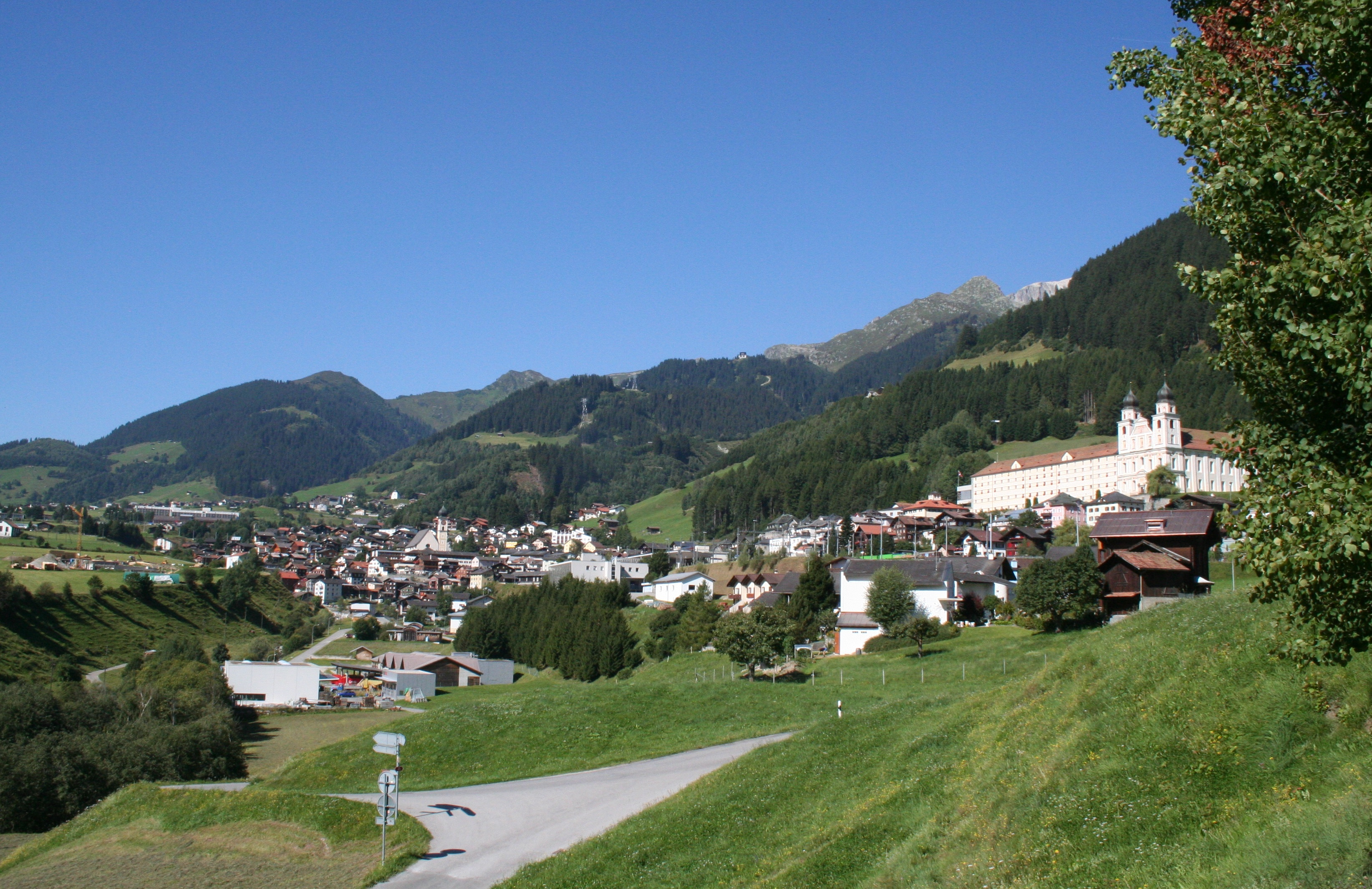
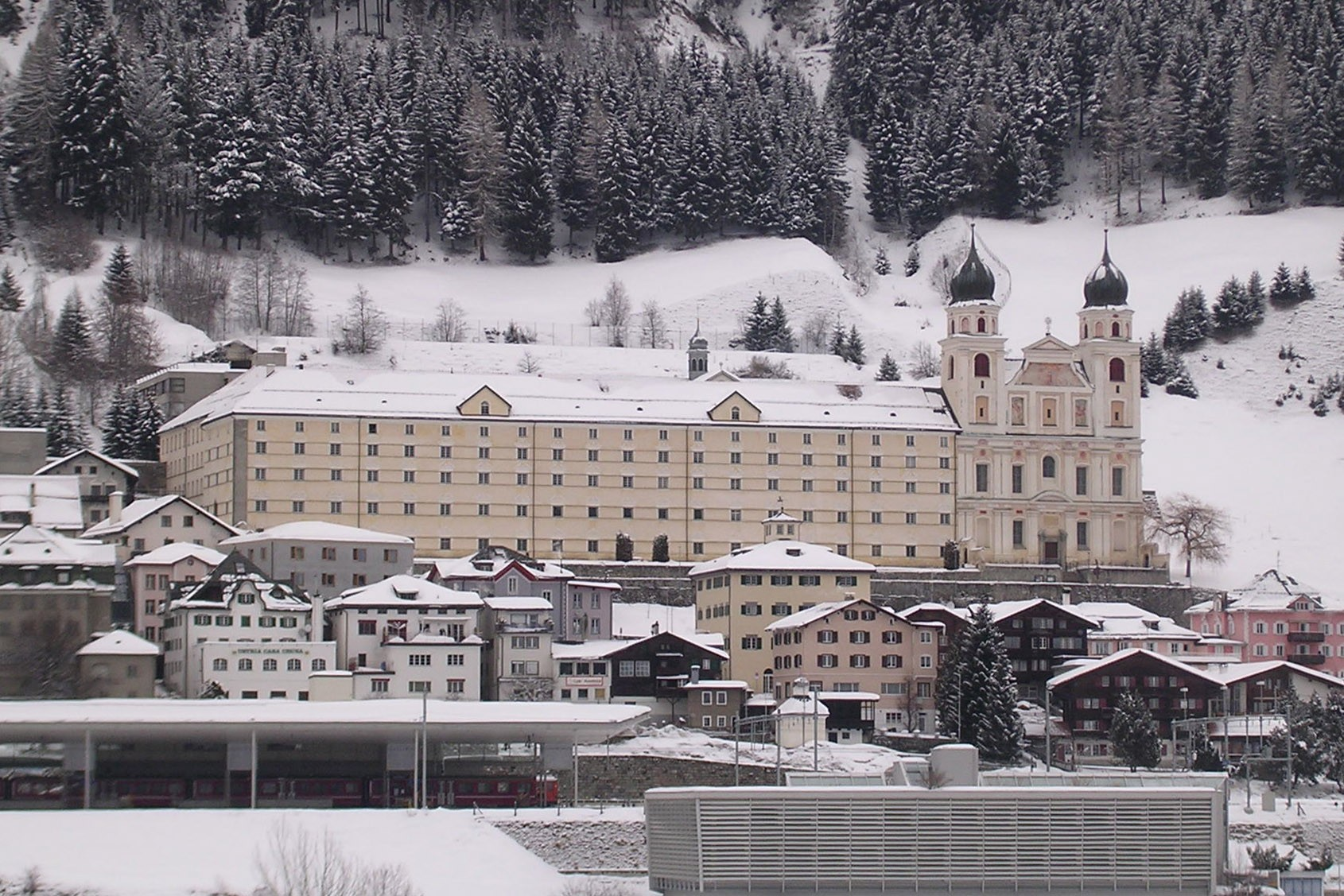
- Disentis Abbey

- Flag Coat of arms
- Location of Disentis/Mustér
- Location within Switzerland Location within Canton of Grisons
- Coordinates: 46°42′N 8°52′E
- Country: Switzerland
- Canton: Grisons
- District: Surselva

Government
  - Mayor: Francestg Cajacob (as of 01012013)

Area
  - Total: 91.08 km^{2} (35.17 sq mi)
- Elevation (Railway station): 1,130 m (3,710 ft)

Population (December 2020)
  - Total: 2,009
  - Density: 22.06/km^{2} (57.13/sq mi)
- Time zone: UTC+01:00 (CET)
  - Summer (DST): UTC+02:00 (CEST)
- Postal code: 7180
- SFOS number: 3982
- ISO 3166 code: CH-GR
- Surrounded by: Linthal (GL), Medel (Lucmagn), Silenen (UR), Sumvitg, Tujetsch
- Website: disentis.ch

Mustér ([muˈʃteː], Romansh) or Disentis (German), with its official name Disentis/Mustér is a village and a municipality in the Surselva Region in the Swiss canton of Grisons.

The skiing and summer tourism resort high up in the Rhine valley is the site of one of the oldest Benedictine monasteries in Switzerland. The monastery dates back to 720, its huge current complex dates from 1696 to 1712.

== History ==
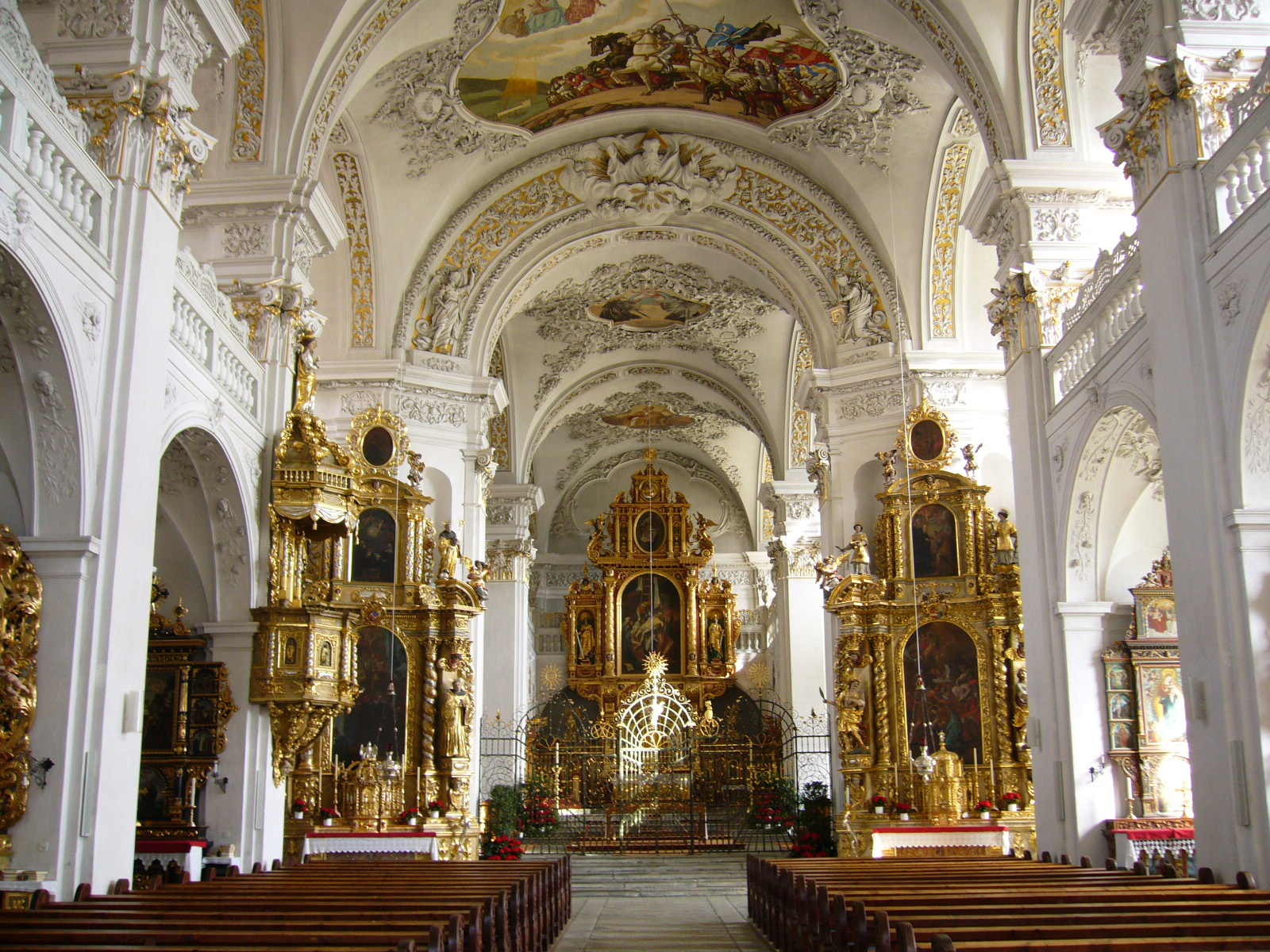
Church of the monastery

Aerial view (1954)

Disentis is first mentioned in 765 as Desertina. In 1127 it was mentioned as monasterium Dissertinensis. The name Disentis is supposed to come from Latin Desertina, used for the deserted valley in late antique times, while the Romansh name Mustér refers to the monastery.

Disentis Abbey, founded in ca. 720, was already in early medieval times the cultural and political center of the later Grisons. Situated on the road to the Lukmanier pass used by the German emperors on their way to Italy, Disentis became a place of international importance in the high Middle Ages and the prince abbot of Disentis was the lord of the Rhine valley. In the later Middle Ages, the farmer communities in the valleys became stronger and the influence of the monastery decreased, but the abbot of Disentis still played an important role in the founding of the Grey League in 1395.

When the Grey League became a formal ally of the Swiss Confederation in 1497, Disentis, at the foot of the Oberalp pass which was the nearest connection to the confederation, was again in a strategically important situation, but later on it was overtaken in importance by the larger Ilanz.

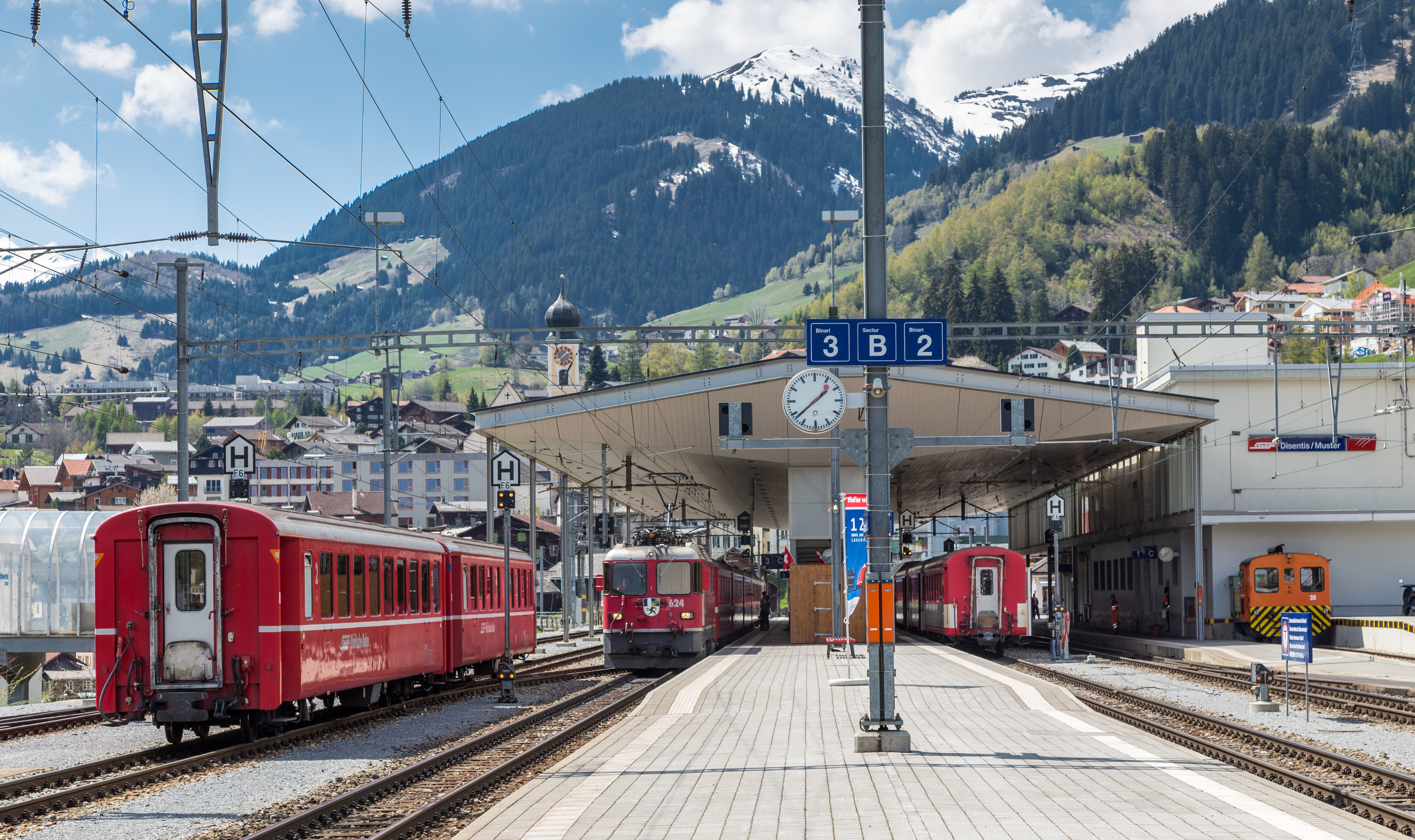
Disentis-Muster railway station

== Geography ==
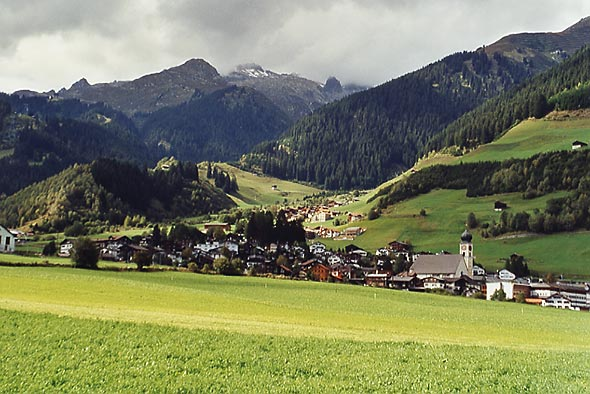
Disentis town and church, showing settlement Clavaniev and Piz Ault in the background

Disentis/Mustér has an area, as of 2006, of 91.1 km^{2} (35.2 sq mi). Of this area, 21.8% is used for agricultural purposes, while 22% is forested. Of the rest of the land, 1.8% is settled (buildings or roads) and the remainder (54.3%) is non-productive (rivers, glaciers or mountains).

Before 2017, the municipality was located in the Disentis sub-district of the Surselva district (which was, until the end of 2000, the Vorderrhein district). It is the largest of the seven municipalities that make up the Disentis sub-district and is the capital. It consists of the center village of Mustér-Vitg and the neighboring villages of Mompé-Tujetsch, Segnes, Acletta, Funs/Clavaniev, Disla, Cavardiras and Mompé-Medel. Except for the two Mompé villages, all the villages contain multiple scattered settlements. The settlement of Brulf near Disentis village was covered in a rockslide in 1689. Until 1963 Disentis/Mustér was known as Disentis/Mustèr.

Disentis lies on the highest step of the Rhine valley, where the roads of the Oberalp pass coming from central and western Switzerland and of the Lukmanier pass coming from the Ticino meet. It has a station where the line from Brig meets the line from Chur and is connected by train and road to the Valais via the Oberalp pass and to Chur following the Rhine valley. The Lukmanier pass road is in summer served by a post bus line.

== Culture ==
Most of the population (as of 2000) speaks Romansh (75.3%), with German being second most common (20.4%) and Portuguese third (1.4%). The official language of the municipality is the Sursilvan dialect of Romansh. While Swiss German and German are spoken by most people as second and third languages respectively, the local laws are only in Romansh.

Disentis is one of the most important centers of the Romansh language, especially of its Sursilvan dialect. It also plays an important role as cultural center through the high school of the monastery.

== Tourism ==
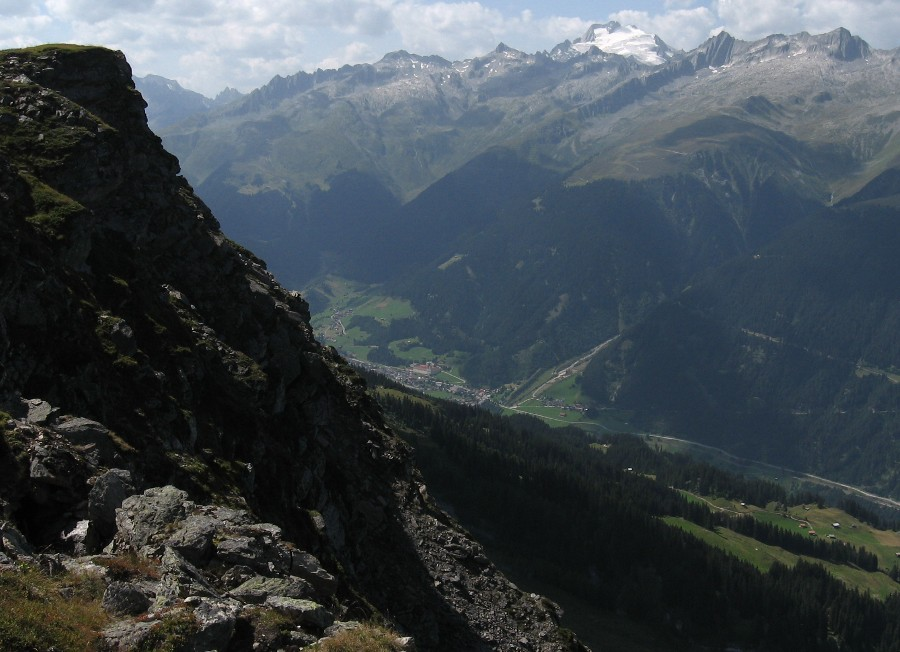
Disentis valley seen from southeast

Tourism started around 1870 and today Disentis is a resort offering 150 kilometers (93 mi) of hiking trails in summer and 30 km (19 mi) of cross country tracks in winter. For alpine skiers there are 6 ski lift up to 2833m. There are 14 hotels and 21 restaurants, and together with neighbour municipality Sedrun, Disentis offers a total of 10,000 beds in hotels and holiday apartments.

=== Heritage sites of national significance ===
The Basilica of S. Gada, Disentis Abbey, the Chapel of S. Luzi in Disla, the Chapel of S. Maria in Acletta and the Punt Russein bridge (shared with Sumvitg) are listed as Swiss heritage sites of national significance.

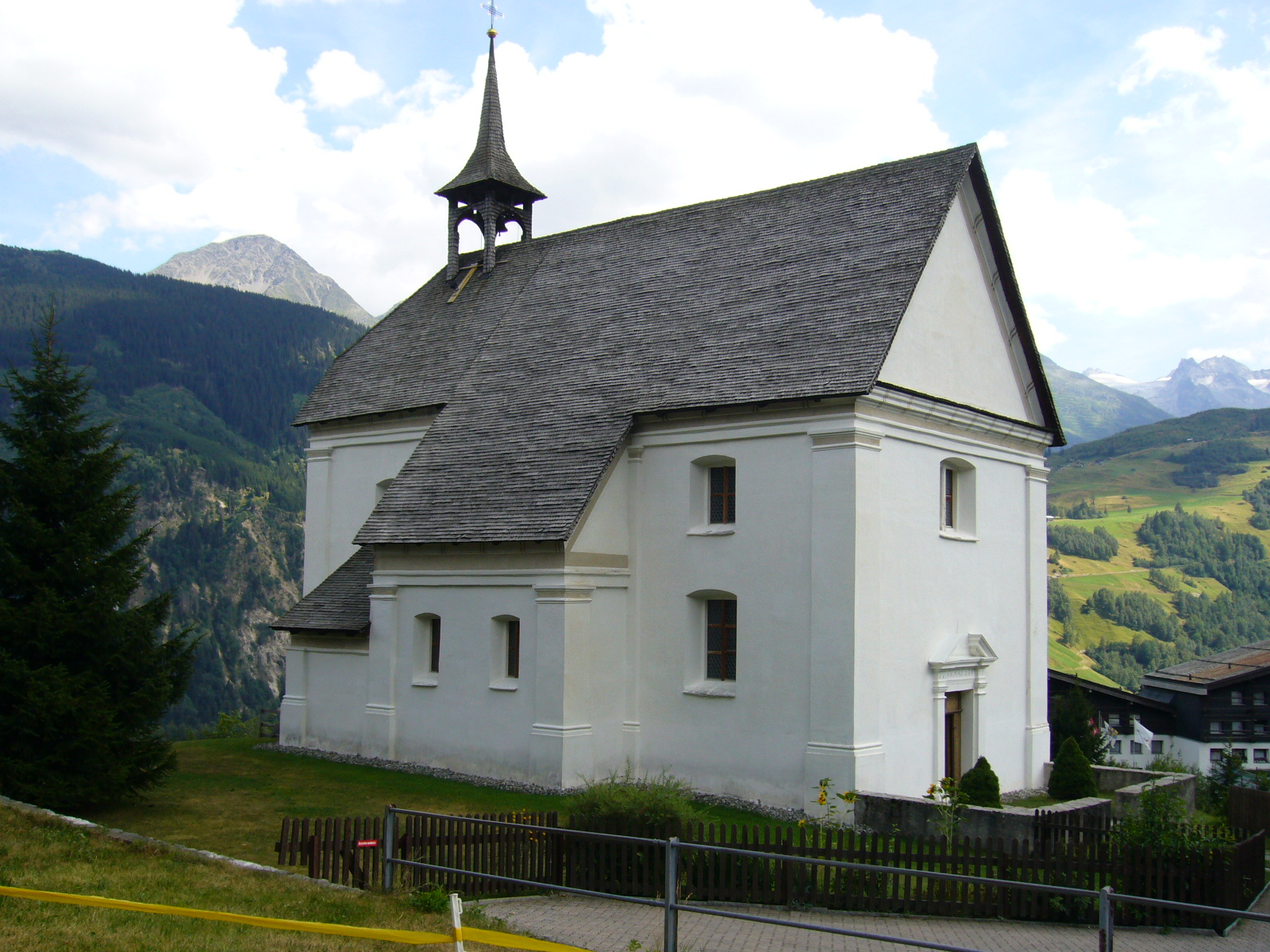
Chapel of S. Maria in Acletta

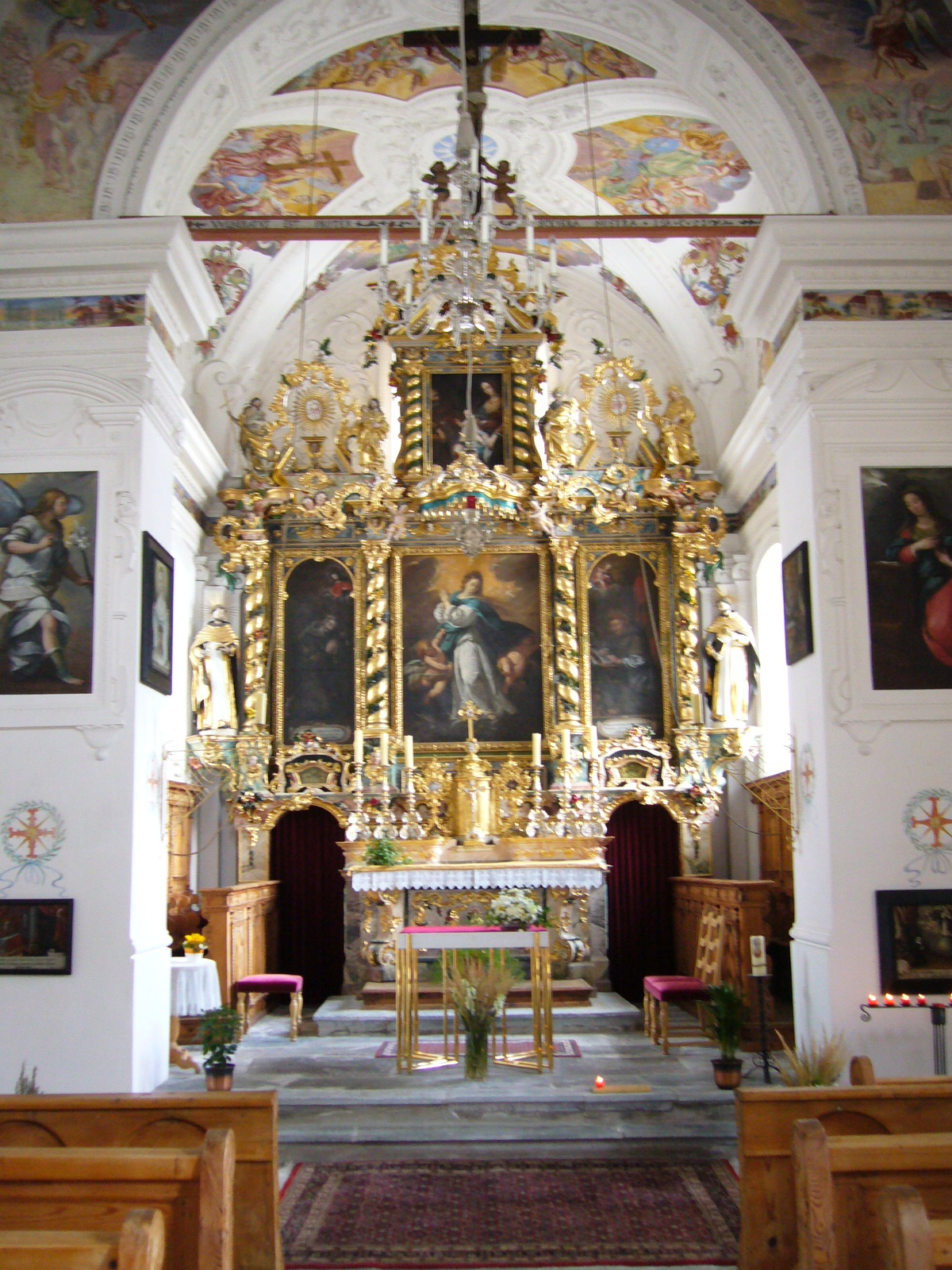
Chapel of S. Maria in Acletta, interior

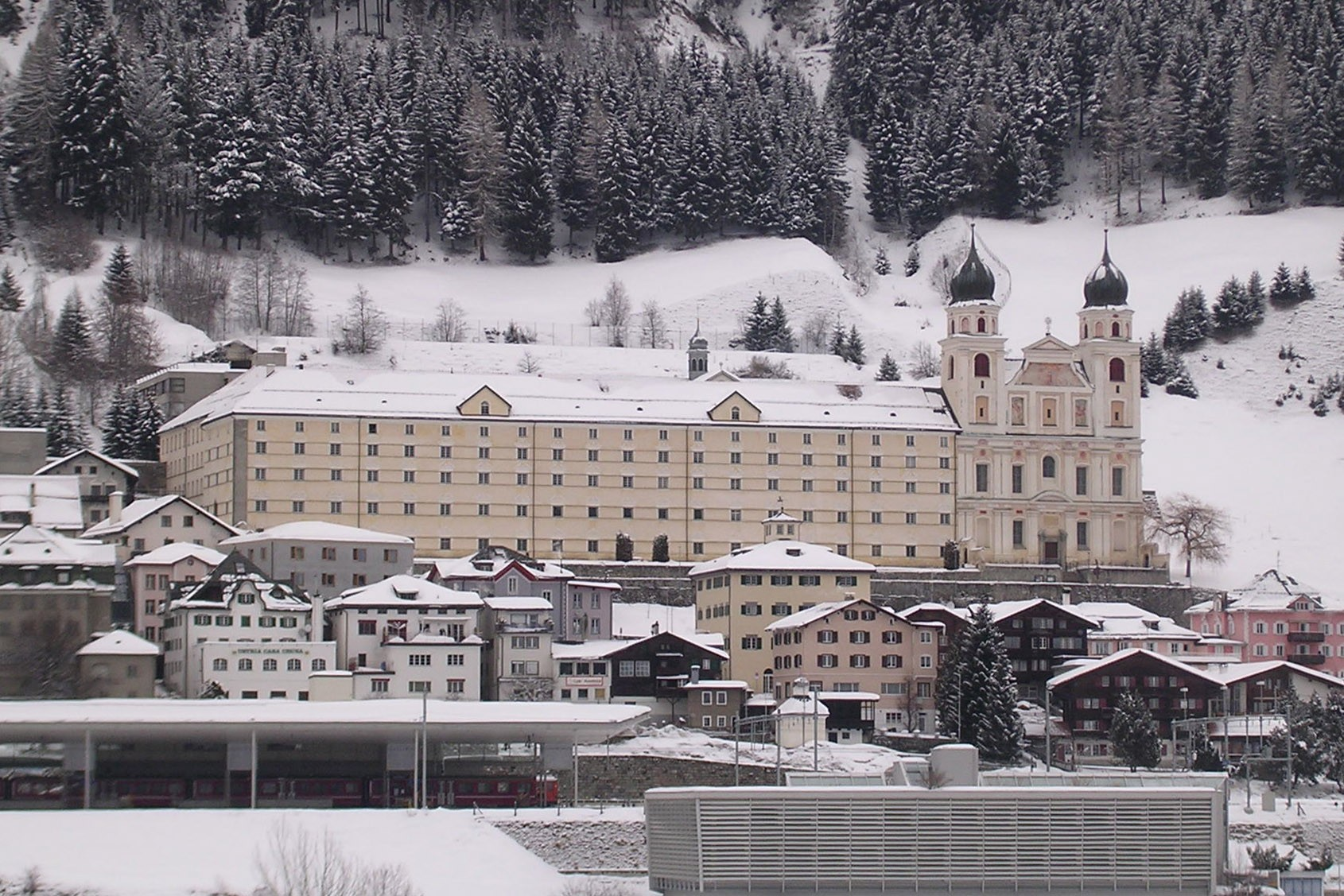
Disentis Abbey

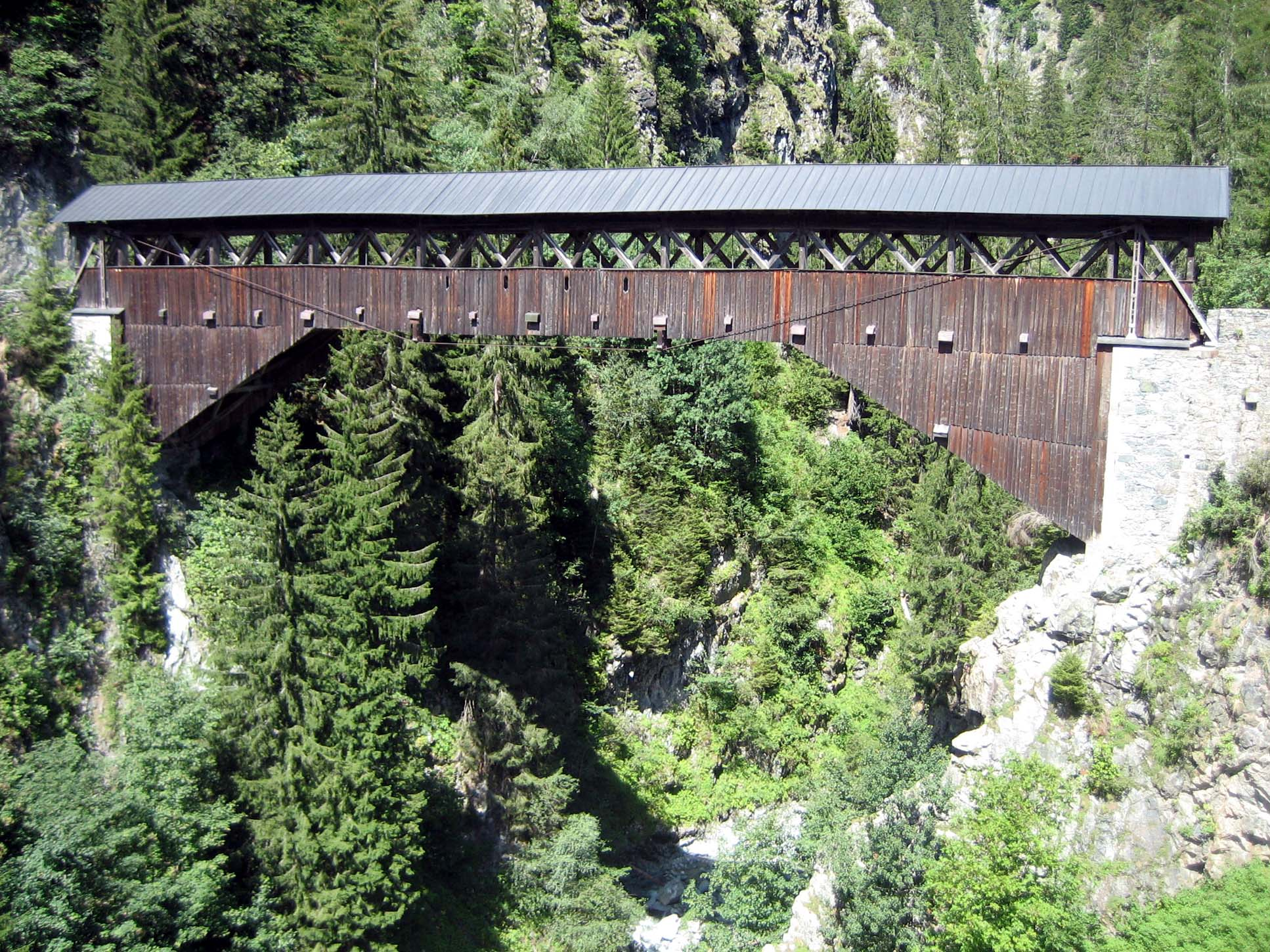
Punt Russein bridge (shared with Sumvitg)

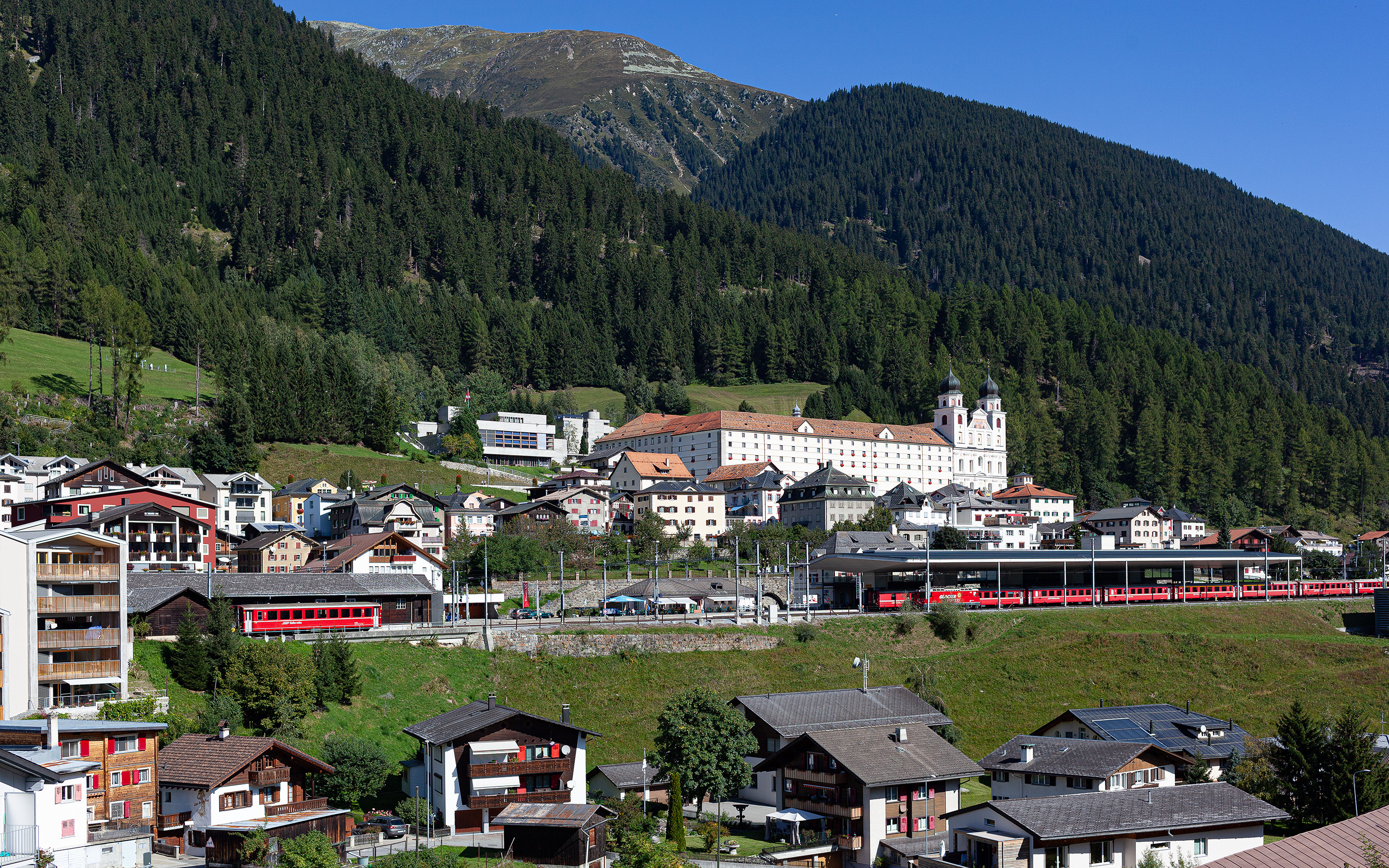
Disentis Abbey, view from Via Lucmagn

== Climate ==
Climate data for Disentis/Sedrun, elevation 1,800 m (5,900 ft), (1991–2020)
Month	Jan	Feb	Mar	Apr	May	Jun	Jul	Aug	Sep	Oct	Nov	Dec	Year
Mean daily maximum °C (°F)	2.6 (36.7)	3.5 (38.3)	7.6 (45.7)	11.4 (52.5)	15.7 (60.3)	19.9 (67.8)	21.7 (71.1)	21.1 (70.0)	16.8 (62.2)	12.8 (55.0)	6.8 (44.2)	3.2 (37.8)	11.9 (53.4)
Daily mean °C (°F)	−1.1 (30.0)	−0.8 (30.6)	2.6 (36.7)	6.3 (43.3)	10.4 (50.7)	14.0 (57.2)	15.8 (60.4)	15.5 (59.9)	11.7 (53.1)	8.0 (46.4)	3.0 (37.4)	−0.2 (31.6)	7.1 (44.8)
Mean daily minimum °C (°F)	−4.1 (24.6)	−4.2 (24.4)	−1.3 (29.7)	1.9 (35.4)	5.8 (42.4)	9.0 (48.2)	11.0 (51.8)	11.1 (52.0)	7.7 (45.9)	4.5 (40.1)	0.1 (32.2)	−3.1 (26.4)	3.2 (37.8)
Average precipitation mm (inches)	65.6 (2.58)	48.5 (1.91)	66.8 (2.63)	82.7 (3.26)	109.8 (4.32)	112.4 (4.43)	109.4 (4.31)	132.9 (5.23)	112.0 (4.41)	106.0 (4.17)	105.5 (4.15)	73.9 (2.91)	1,125.5 (44.31)
Average snowfall cm (inches)	81.1 (31.9)	71.3 (28.1)	54.6 (21.5)	37.9 (14.9)	9.0 (3.5)	0.8 (0.3)	0.0 (0.0)	0.0 (0.0)	1.0 (0.4)	11.6 (4.6)	51.0 (20.1)	63.4 (25.0)	381.7 (150.3)
Average precipitation days (≥ 1.0 mm)	8.5	7.4	8.5	8.3	11.5	12.3	11.8	12.9	9.7	9.0	9.8	9.1	118.8
Average snowy days (≥ 1.0 cm)	10.2	9.6	8.2	5.4	1.1	0.2	0.0	0.0	0.1	1.3	6.9	9.1	52.1
Average relative humidity (%)	69	68	67	65	68	70	71	74	75	73	75	72	71
Mean monthly sunshine hours	85.8	96.1	137.3	141.4	148.9	172.9	197.2	183.4	154.9	117.7	74.6	71.9	1,582.1
Percentage possible sunshine	49	48	47	43	39	45	51	52	50	49	42	44	47
Source 1: NOAA
Source 2: MeteoSwiss (snow 1981–2010)

== Demographics ==
Disentis/Mustér has a population (as of 31 December 2020) of 2,009. As of 2008, 8.9% of the population was made up of foreign nationals. Over the last 10 years the population has decreased at a rate of -4.7%.

As of 2000, the gender distribution of the population was 51.1% male and 48.9% female. The age distribution, as of 2000, in Disentis/Mustér is; 219 children or 10.1% of the population are between 0 and 9 years old and 343 teenagers or 15.8% are between 10 and 19. Of the adult population, 207 people or 9.5% of the population are between 20 and 29 years old. 289 people or 13.3% are between 30 and 39, 316 people or 14.5% are between 40 and 49, and 272 people or 12.5% are between 50 and 59. The senior population distribution is 215 people or 9.9% of the population are between 60 and 69 years old, 169 people or 7.8% are between 70 and 79, there are 113 people or 5.2% who are between 80 and 89 there are 29 people or 1.3% who are between 90 and 99.

In the 2007 federal election the most popular party was the CVP which received 66.8% of the vote. The next three most popular parties were the SVP (17.4%), the SP (9.9%) and the FDP (5.3%).

The entire Swiss population is generally well educated. In Disentis/Mustér about 64.5% of the population (between age 25-64) have completed either non-mandatory upper secondary education or additional higher education (either university or a Fachhochschule).

Disentis/Mustér has an unemployment rate of 0.79%. As of 2005, there were 107 people employed in the primary economic sector and about 43 businesses involved in this sector. 341 people are employed in the secondary sector and there are 29 businesses in this sector. 719 people are employed in the tertiary sector, with 102 businesses in this sector.

The historical population is given in the following table:

year	population
1850	1,260
1900	1,359
1950	2,330
2000	2,172
2010	2,111

== Religion ==
From the 2000 census, 1,954 or 90.0% are Roman Catholic, while 79 or 3.6% belonged to the Swiss Reformed Church. Of the rest of the population, there are 8 individuals (or about 0.37% of the population) who belong to the Orthodox Church, and there are 5 individuals (or about 0.23% of the population) who belong to another Christian church. There are 16 (or about 0.74% of the population) who are Islamic. There are 6 individuals (or about 0.28% of the population) who belong to another church (not listed on the census), 42 (or about 1.93% of the population) belong to no church, are agnostic or atheist, and 67 individuals (or about 3.08% of the population) did not answer the question.

== Transportation ==
The municipality has four railway stations: Disentis/Mustér, Acla da Fontauna, Segnas, and Mumpé Tujetsch. The first of these is located at the junction of the Reichenau-Tamins–Disentis/Mustér line and the Furka Oberalp line, while the latter three are located to the west on the Furka Oberalp line. Between them there is regular service to Scuol-Tarasp, Zermatt, Andermatt, and St. Moritz.
