= Piz Ault =

Mountain in Switzerland

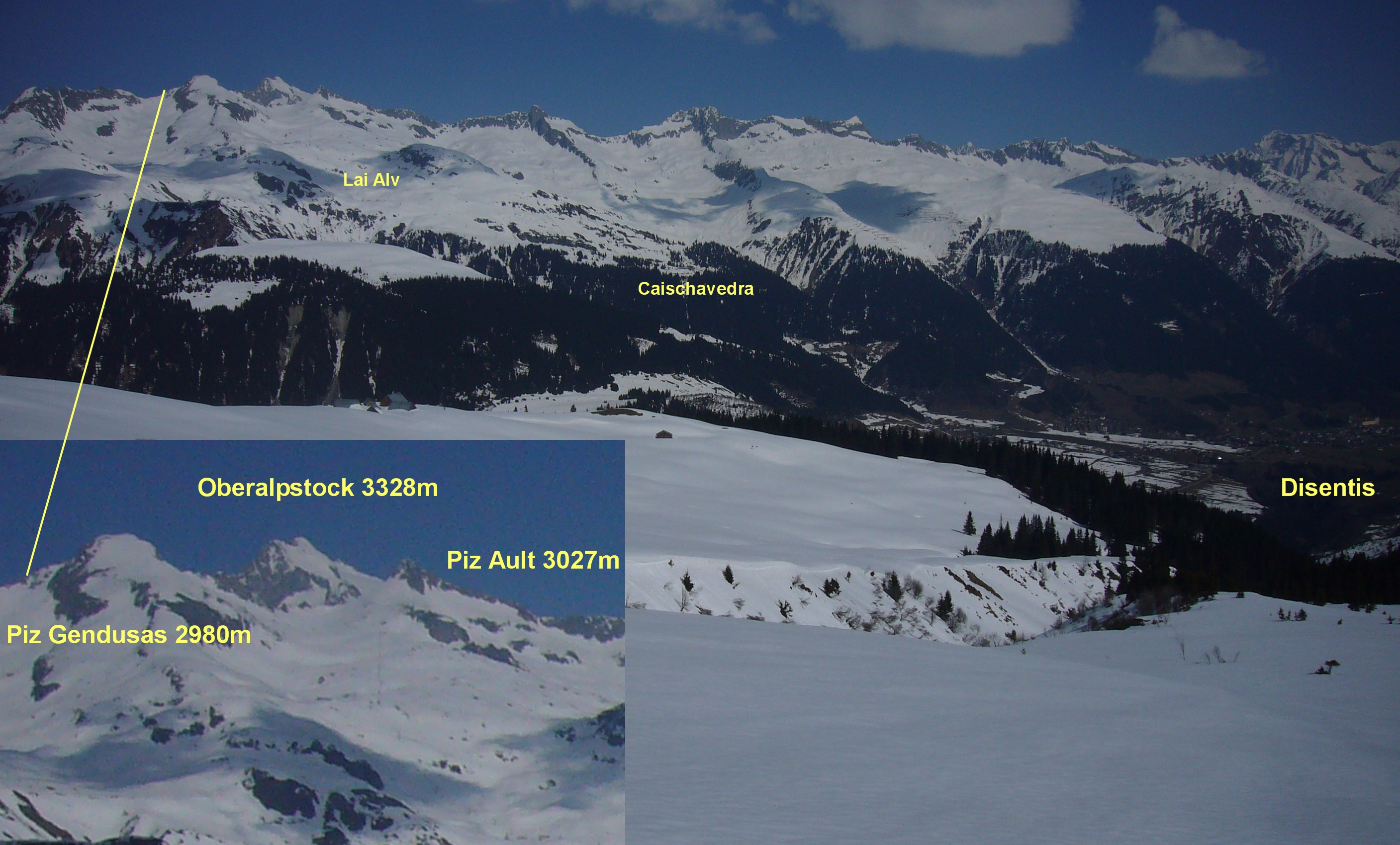
- Piz Ault in the left part of the picture. A ski lift reaches to some 200 m (660 ft) under the peak, the lifts starting at Disentis. In April at date of the picture the winter season would be finished already.

Highest point
- Elevation: 3,027 m (9,931 ft)
- Prominence: 195 m (640 ft)
- Parent peak: Oberalpstock
- Coordinates: 46°43′42.1″N 8°46′55.1″E

Geography
- Location within Switzerland
- Location: Graubünden/Uri, Switzerland
- Parent range: Glarus Alps

Piz Ault is a mountain of the Glarus Alps, located south of the Oberalpstock in Switzerland.

Three ridges lead to the peak with a fourth one not very distinct to the south. The frontier between the Canton of Uri and the Canton of Graubünden lies on the eastern and the northern ridge, making it a three-quarter Graubünden mountain. The municipalities are Disentis and Sedrun on the south and Silenen to the northeast. There is no path leading onto the peak for hikers. In winter time the area is accessible by a T-Bar ski lift which reaches up to some 200 meters (660 ft) under its peak in its southwestern face. The ski resort is accessible from Disentis, lying south of Piz Ault in the State (Canton) of Graubünden.
