= Sedrun railway station =

Metre gauge railway station in Sedrun, Graubünden, Switzerland

Sedrun
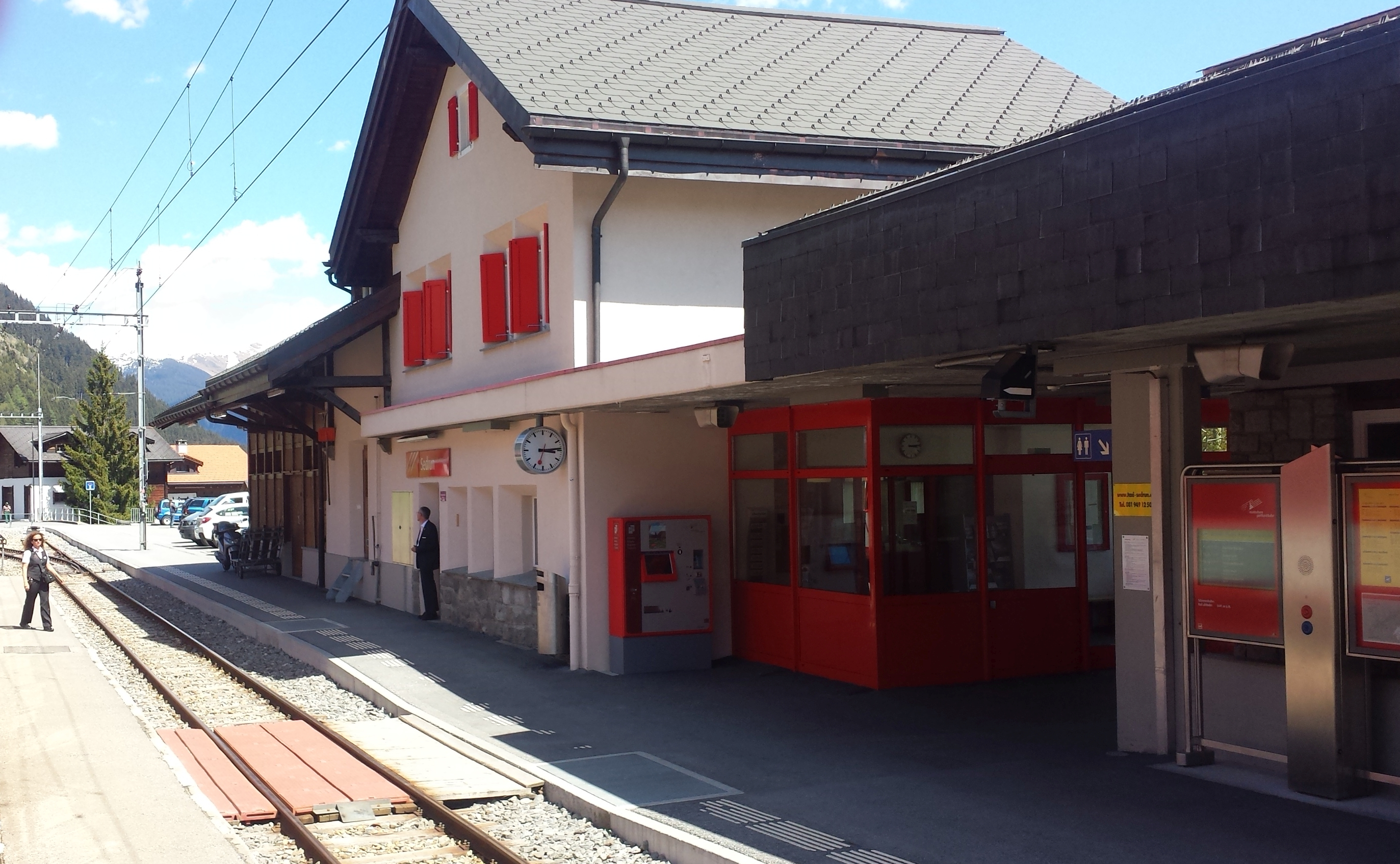
- The station building in 2017

General information
- Location: Via dalla Staziun 1 Tujetsch; Switzerland
- Coordinates: 46°40′52″N 8°46′11″E
- Elevation: 1,441.2 m (4,728 ft)
- Owner: Matterhorn Gotthard Bahn
- Line: Furka Oberalp line
- Distance: 87.77 km (54.54 mi) from Brig Bahnhofplatz
- Train operators: Matterhorn Gotthard Bahn

History
- Opened: 3 July 1926
- Electrified: 29 May 1941

Services
Preceding station	Matterhorn Gotthard Bahn	Following station
Rueras towards Andermatt	R 45	Bugnei towards Disentis/Mustér
Andermatt Terminus	Oberalp car shuttle train	Terminus
Location
- Location within Switzerland

Sedrun railway station is a metre gauge railway station serving the village of Sedrun, in the Canton of Graubünden, Switzerland. The station is at the eastern end of the Oberalp Pass. It forms part of the Furka Oberalp Bahn (FO), which connects Brig in Valais, via Andermatt in Uri, with Göschenen, Uri, and, via the Oberalp Pass, with Sedrun and Disentis/Mustér, Graubünden.

Since 1 January 2003, the FO has been owned and operated by the Matterhorn Gotthard Bahn (MGB), following a merger between the FO and the Brig-Visp-Zermatt railway (BVZ).

== Services ==
The MGB operates regional services between Andermatt and Disentis/Mustér via Sedrun, at hourly intervals. These services connect in Andermatt with other MGB regional services, operating to Brig Bahnhofplatz and Göschenen. They also connect in Disentis/Mustér with similar hourly regional services, operated by the Rhaetian Railway and heading further east.

Additionally, during the winter closure of the Oberalp pass road, the MGB also operates frequent car shuttle trains between Andermatt and Sedrun, via the Oberalp Pass.

Every day several Glacier Express trains pass through Sedrun, but do not stop there.

=== Proposed interchange with Gotthard Base Tunnel ===
Proposals were made during the mid-2000s to build an intermediate station in the Gotthard Base Tunnel, which passes just underneath Sedrun, that would connect the town to the then-under construction rail tunnel. This proposed station would take advantage of the Sedrun multifunction station located in the tunnel (used for emergency stops and maintenance) as a permanent passenger station, connected to the surface by an 800-metre tall system of elevators, with the portal near the town of Sedrun and connected to the Rhaetian Railway by a system of buses. Proponents argued that the station would provide an important transport link for the town and the broader canton of Graubünden, and the project received CHP 7.5 million in initial startup funding by the Swiss parliament, though the project was later put on hold and later cancelled as being uneconomical, with a government report stating that it would have significantly reduced freight capacity and requiring CHF 9M of annual public subsidies. If built, this would have been the deepest rail station in the world, and the connecting elevators would have been the tallest commercial elevators in the world.

== Gallery ==
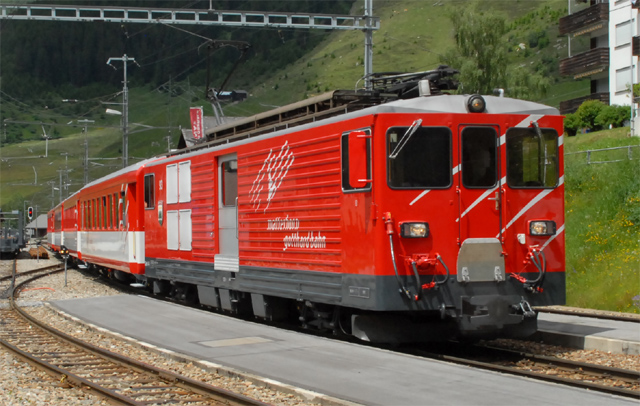
Deh 4/4II 93 with a train in Sedrun

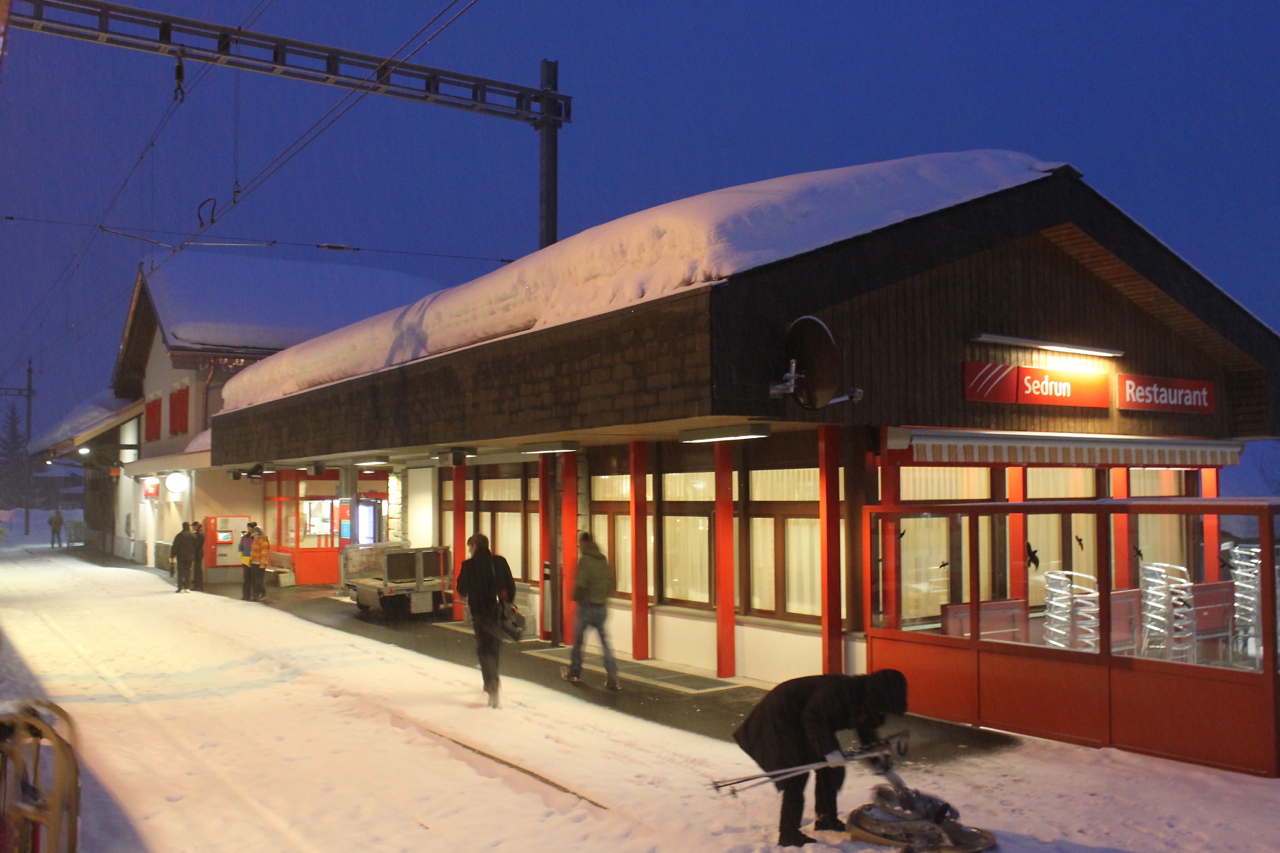
The station in winter

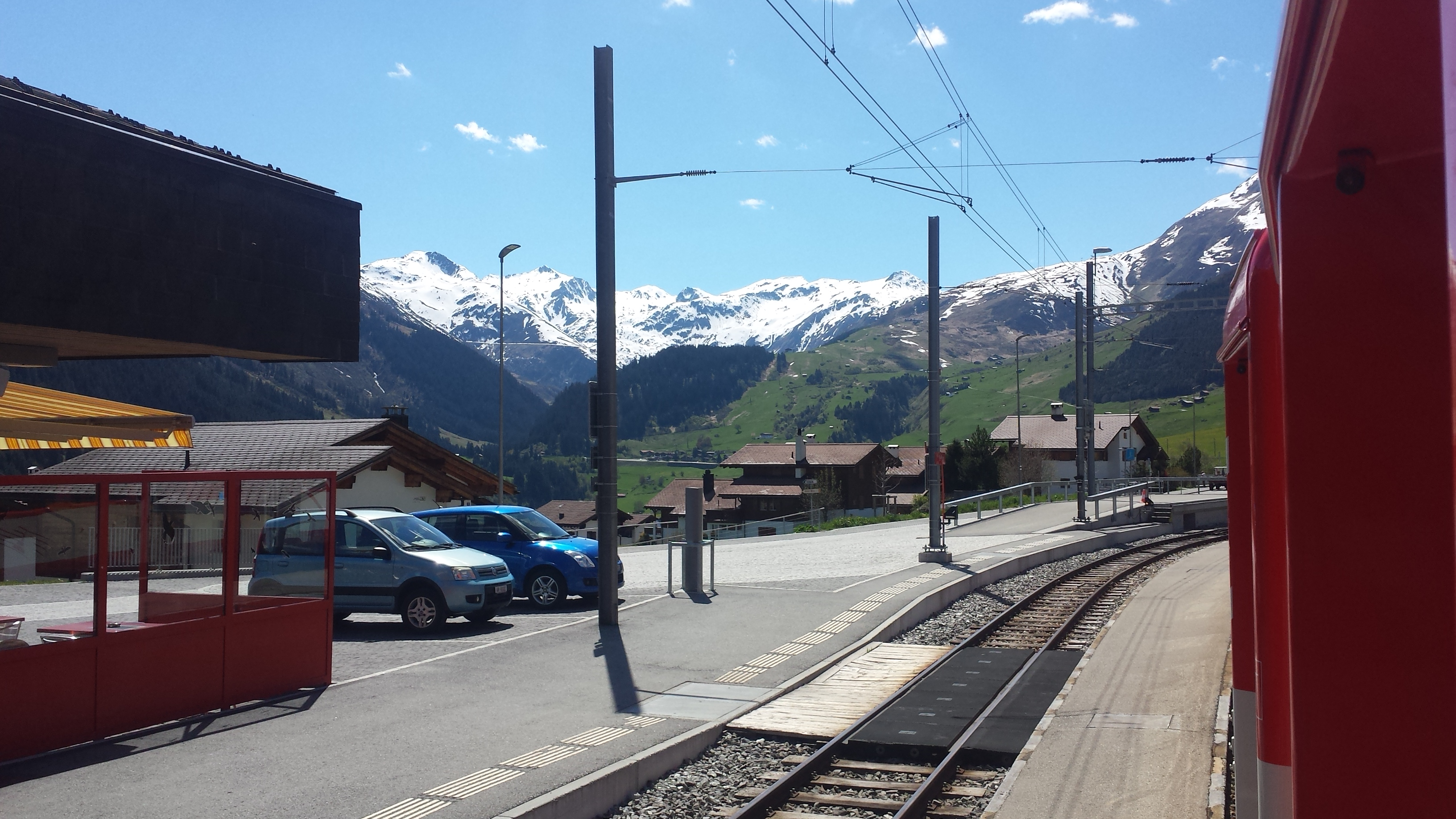
The station looking back toward the Oberalp pass

== See also ==
- Car shuttle train
- Oberalp Pass
- Matterhorn Gotthard Bahn
- Furka Oberalp Bahn

== Bibliography ==
- Moser, Beat; Jossi, Urs (2007). MGB Matterhorn Gotthard Bahn (in German). Vol. 2. Fürstenfeldbruck, Germany: Eisenbahn-Journal (Verlagsgruppe Bahn GmbH). ISBN 978-3-89610-175-4.
- "Official timetable of Switzerland". Bundesamt für Verkehr. Archived from the original on 2014-09-28. (in English)
