= Andermatt railway station =

Swiss railway station

Andermatt
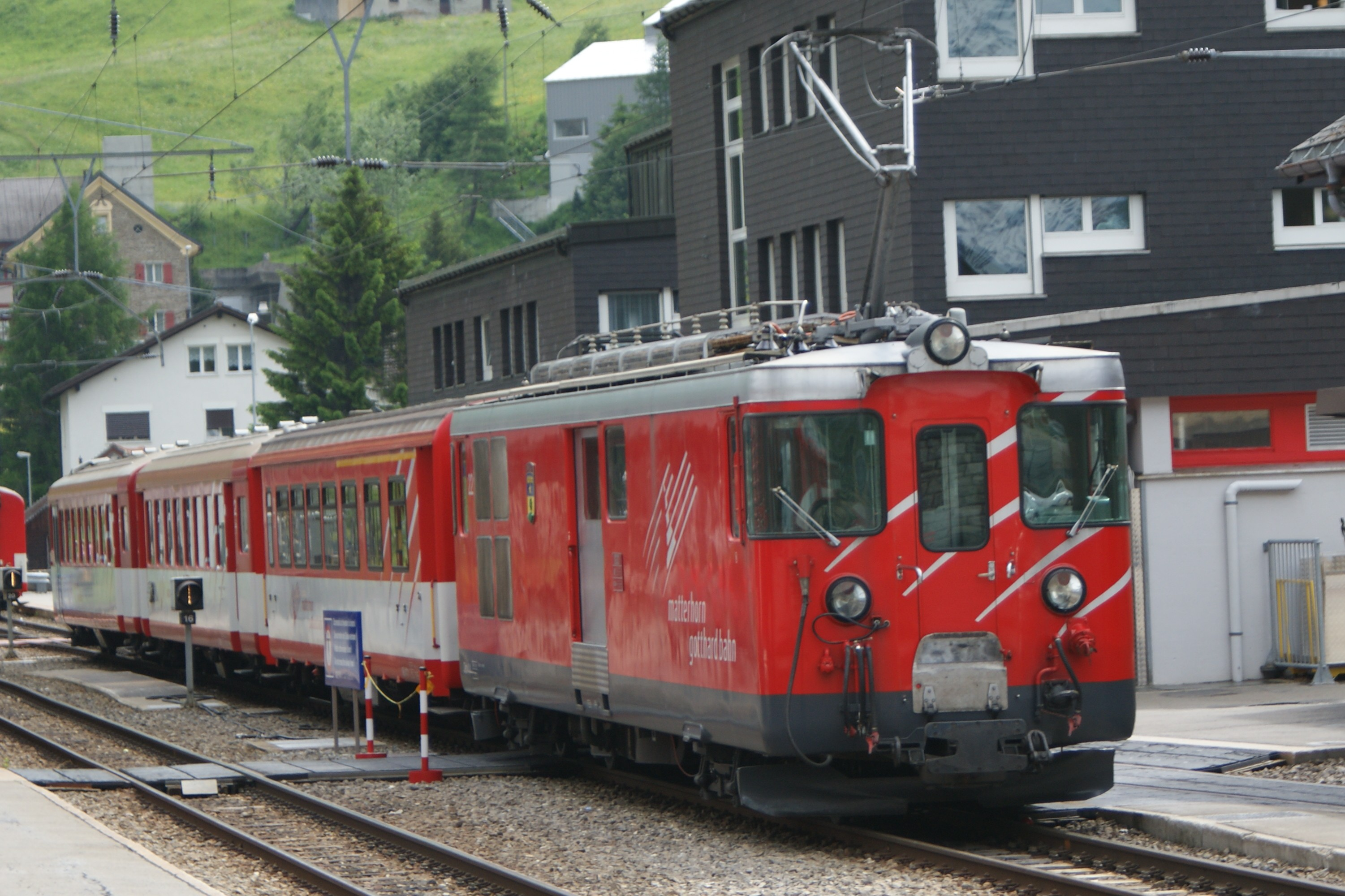
- A regional train at Andermatt station

General information
- Location: Bahnhofstrasse 2 Andermatt; Switzerland
- Coordinates: 46°38′13″N 8°35′36″E
- Elevation: 1,435.7 m (4,710 ft)
- Owner: Matterhorn Gotthard Bahn
- Lines: Furka Oberalp line; Schöllenenbahn
- Distance: 67.94 km (42.22 mi) from Brig
- Platforms: 3
- Train operators: Glacier Express; Matterhorn Gotthard Bahn

History
- Opened: 12 July 1917
- Electrified: 12 July 1917 (1,200 V DC); 29 May 1941 (11 kV AC)

Services
Preceding station	Glacier Express	Following station
Brig Bahnhofplatz towards Zermatt	Glacier Express	Disentis/Mustér towards St. Moritz
Preceding station	Matterhorn Gotthard Bahn	Following station
Hospental towards Visp	R 43	Terminus
Hospental towards Realp	R 44	Göschenen Terminus
Terminus	R 45	Nätschen towards Disentis/Mustér
Terminus	Oberalp car shuttle train	Sedrun Terminus
Location
- Location within Switzerland Location within Canton of Uri

Andermatt railway station is a railway station and junction on the metre gauge Furka Oberalp Bahn (FO), serving the town and municipality of Andermatt, in the canton of Uri, Switzerland. The station is connected, via the Furka Pass, with Brig and Visp in the canton of Valais, and, via the Oberalp Pass, with the western terminus of the Rhaetian Railway at Disentis/Mustér, in the canton of Graubünden. There is also a short branch line, the Schöllenenbahn, between Andermatt and Göschenen, at the northern end of the standard gauge Gotthard Rail Tunnel.

Since 2003, the FO, including Andermatt station and the lines and trains serving it, has been owned and operated by the Matterhorn Gotthard Bahn (MGB).

The station currently has three platforms in use.

== Services ==
As of the December 2022 timetable change, the following services stop at Andermatt:

- Glacier Express: one or more trains per day, depending on the season, between Zermatt and St. Moritz or Chur.
- Regio:
  - half-hourly service to Göschenen.
  - hourly service to Visp.
  - hourly service to Disentis/Mustér.
  - during the winter closure of the Oberalp pass road, frequent car shuttle trains via the Oberalp Pass to Sedrun.
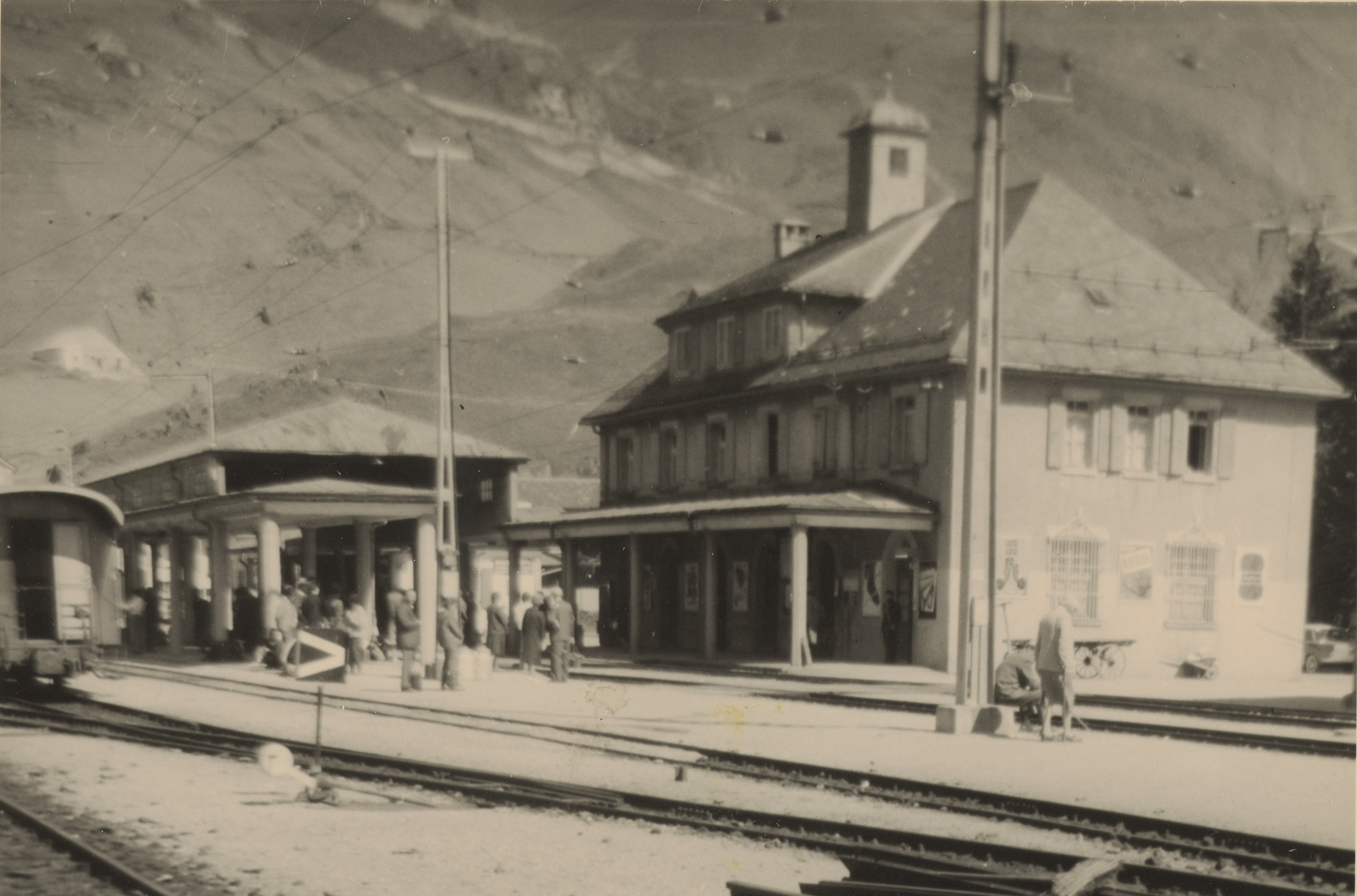
Old station building

== See also ==
- Furka Pass
- Car shuttle train
- Oberalp Pass
- Matterhorn Gotthard Bahn
- Furka Oberalp Bahn
