= Disentis/Mustér railway station =

Railway station in Switzerland

Disentis/Mustér
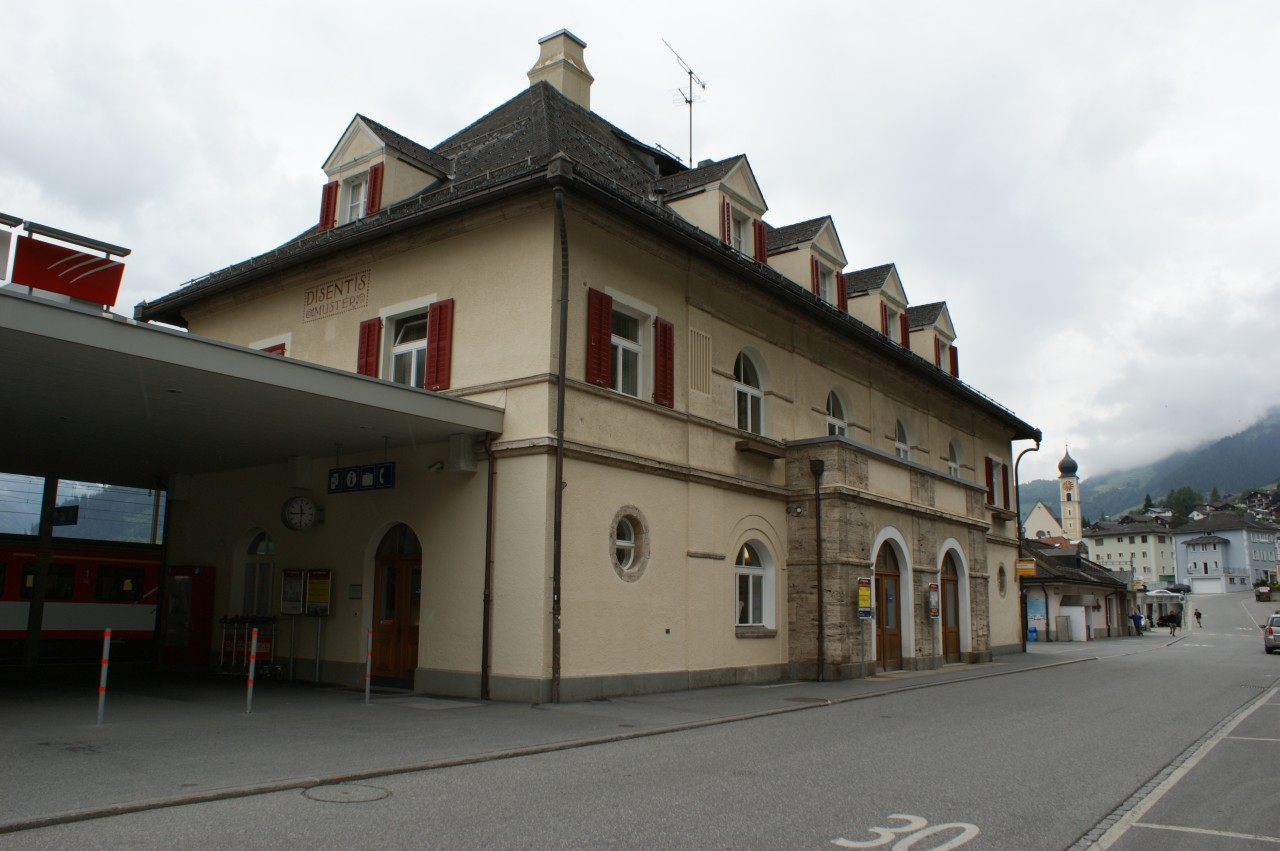
- The station building in 2009

General information
- Location: Via dalla Staziun 2 Disentis/Mustér; Switzerland
- Coordinates: 46°42′18″N 8°51′18″E
- Elevation: 1,129 m (3,704 ft)
- Owner: Rhaetian Railway
- Lines: Furka Oberalp line; Reichenau-Tamins–Disentis/Mustér line
- Distance: 96.94 km (60.24 mi) from Brig Bahnhofplatz; 72.88 km (45.29 mi) from Landquart
- Platforms: 3
- Train operators: Glacier Express; Matterhorn Gotthard Bahn; Rhaetian Railway
- Connections: PostAuto Schweiz buses

Passengers
- 2018: 1,900 per weekday

Services
Preceding station	Glacier Express	Following station
Andermatt towards Zermatt	Glacier Express	Chur towards St. Moritz
Preceding station	Rhaetian Railway	Following station
Terminus	RE 7	Sumvitg-Cumpadials towards Chur
Preceding station	Matterhorn Gotthard Bahn	Following station
Acla da Fontauna towards Andermatt	R 45	Terminus
Location
- Location within Switzerland Location within Canton of Graubünden

Disentis/Mustér railway station is the eastern terminus of the Matterhorn Gotthard Bahn line from Brig via Andermatt, and the western terminus of the Rhaetian Railway line from Landquart via Chur and Reichenau-Tamins. The station is located on the south bank of the river in the village and municipality of Disentis/Mustér, in the Swiss canton of Graubünden.

== Layout ==
The station has three platform tracks, served by a side platform and an island platform, which are situated beneath an overall canopy. The station building is on the northern side of the line and gives direct access to the side platform, whilst the island platform is accessed through a pedestrian subway. To the south of the island platform there are several additional through tracks, and there are sidings on both sides of the station.

== Services ==
The station is served by Rhaetian Railway trains which provide one train per hour to and from Chur, and by Matterhorn Gotthard Bahn regional trains, which provide an hourly train to Andermatt. These two services connect in Disentis/Mustér. Several times a day, the jointly operated Glacier Express train stops at the station, on its tourist-oriented services between Zermatt and St. Moritz.
