= Battle of Devil's Bridge =

War of the Second Coalition battle, 1799

Battle of the Devil's Bridge
- Part of the battles at the Saint-Gotthard (Suvorov's Swiss campaign in the War of the Second Coalition)
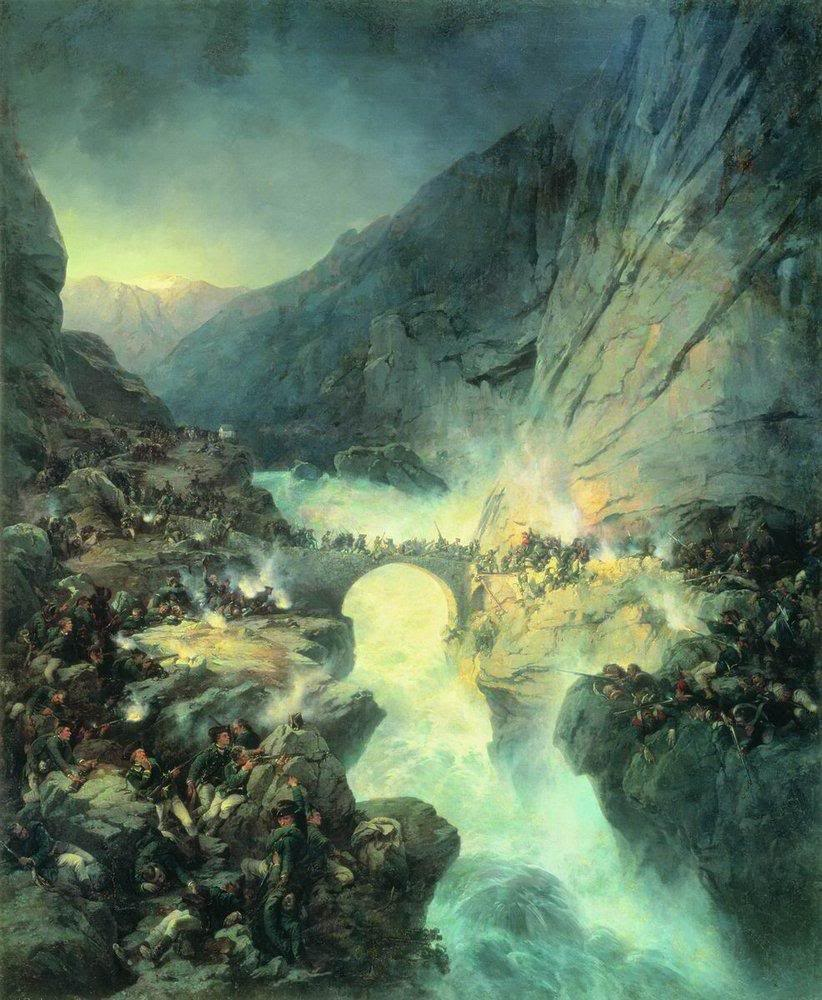
- Combat on Devil's Bridge by Alexander Kotzebue; Hermitage Museum
Date	25 September 1799 (O.S. 14 September 1799)
Location	Teufelsbrücke, Canton of Waldstätten, Helvetic Republic
Result	Russian victory

Belligerents
Russian Empire	French Republic

Commanders and leaders
Alexander Suvorov	Claude Lecourbe

Strength
2 regiments	2 battalions (Note: "behind Devil's Bridge, two battalions under Colonel Daumas' command.")

Casualties and losses
Unidentified	Unidentified

The Battle of (the) Devil's Bridge, (Note: Russian: Бой за Чёртов мост) also called the battle of the Teufelsbrücke, was fought in 1799, on 25 September (September 14 on the Julian calendar – Old Style date), during the War of the Second Coalition as part of Suvorov's Swiss campaign and the battles at the Saint-Gotthard Massif. The Russian troops of Suvorov were advancing against Lecourbe's French troops, stationed in the Schöllenen Gorge area. It was a success for the Imperial Russian Army.

This dramatic battle is shrouded in legends and perceived truths.

== Gallery ==
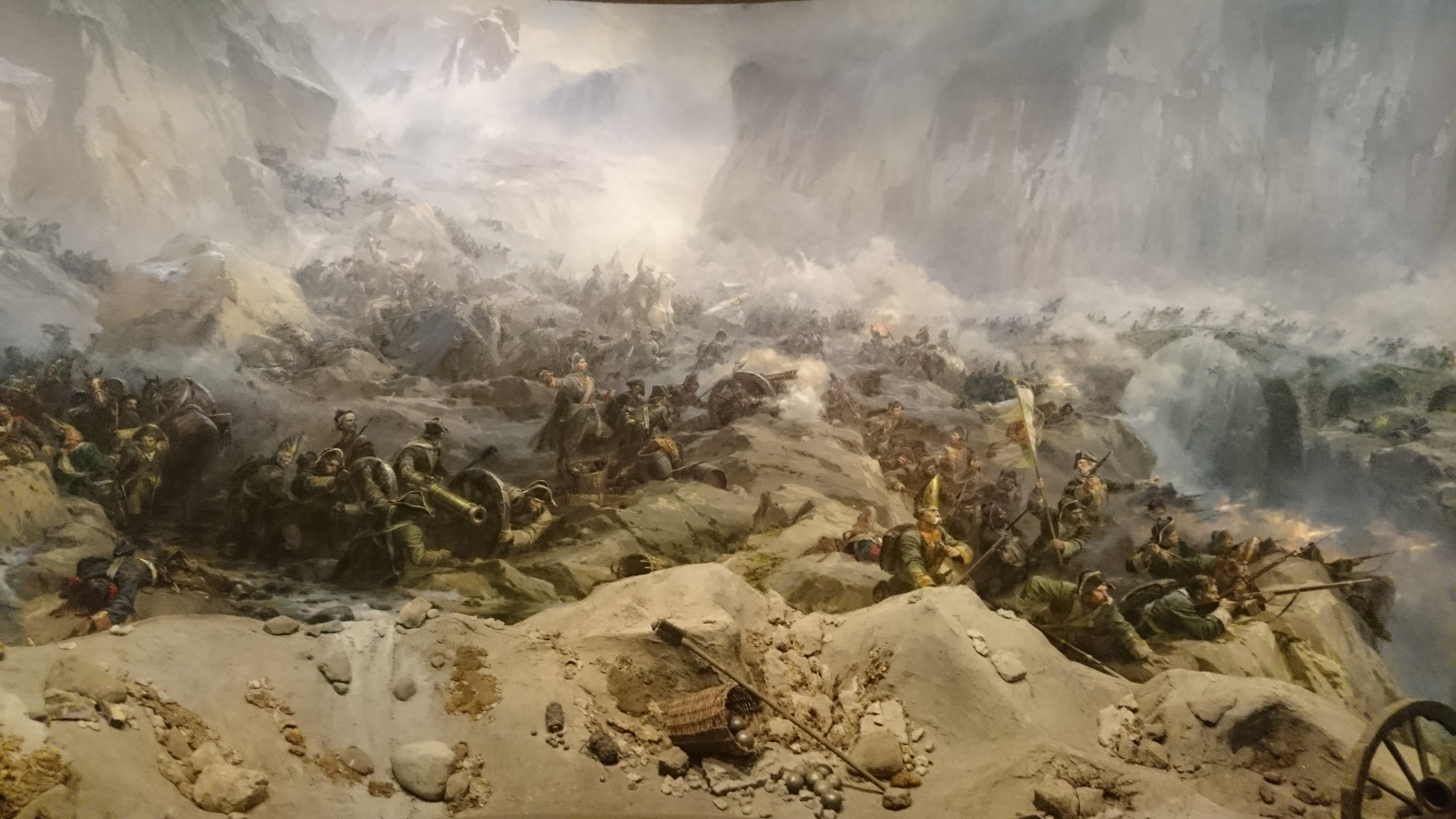
Battle of the Devil's Bridge depiction.

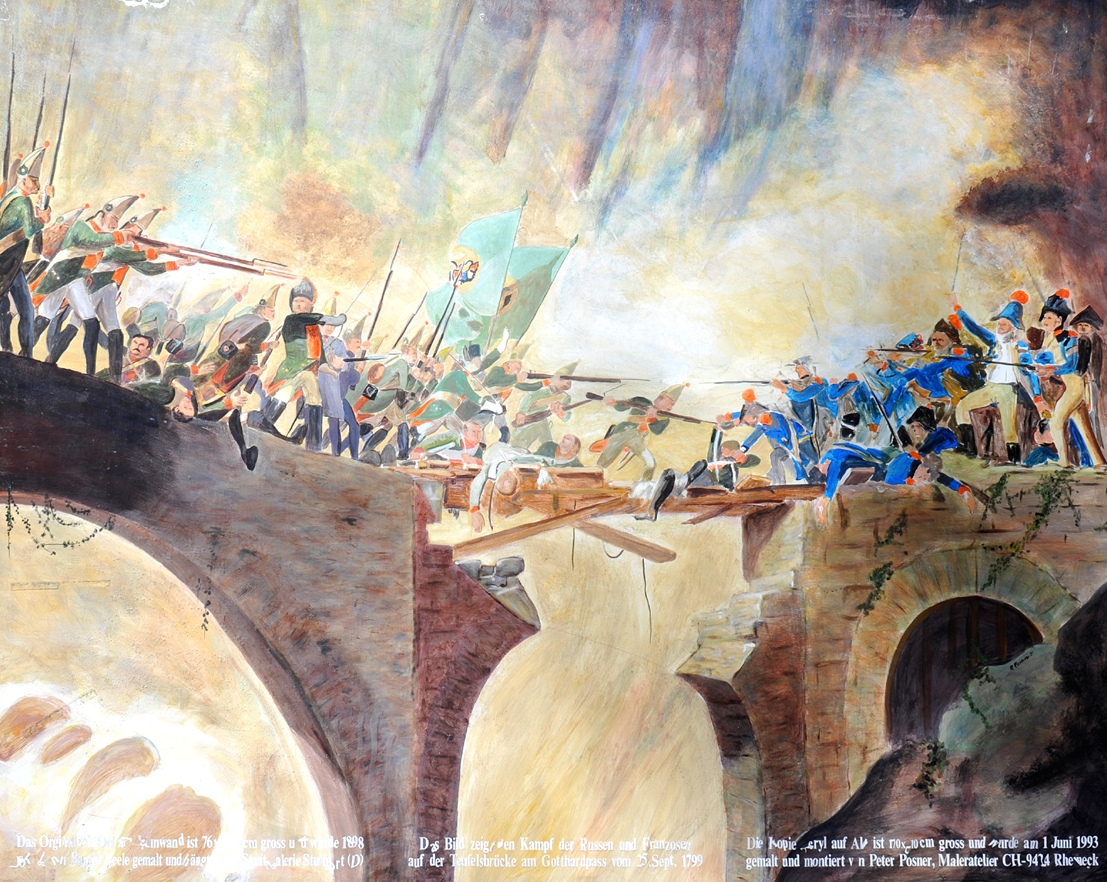
The painting shows the attack of the Russians from the left on the bridge partially destroyed by the French.

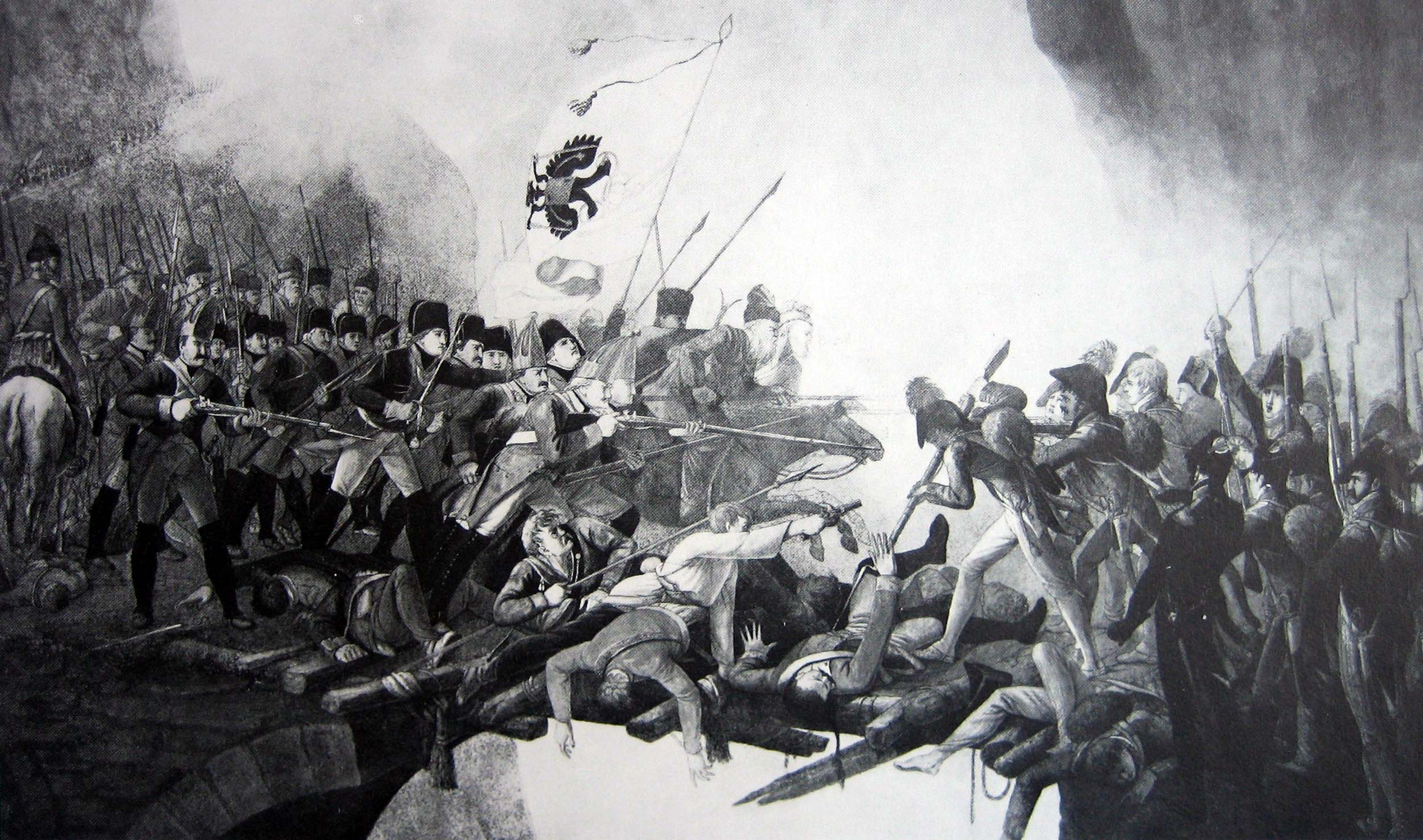
Battle of the Teufelsbrücke between French (right) and Russians (left). Etching, 1800.

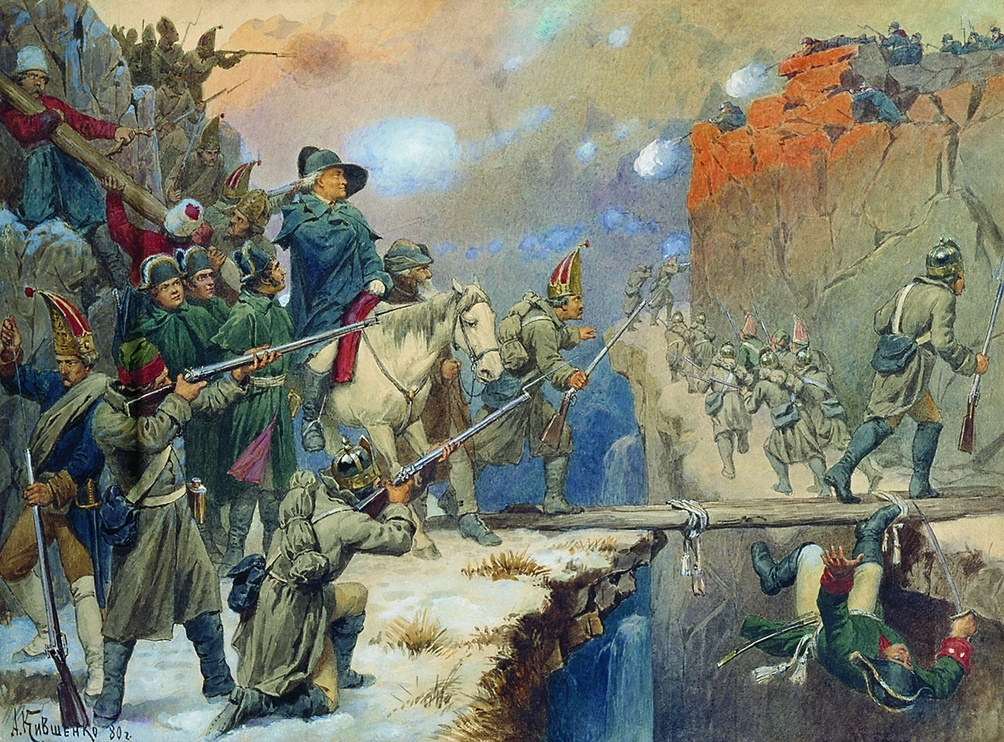
Suvorov's crossing of the Devil's Bridge by Aleksey Kivshenko.

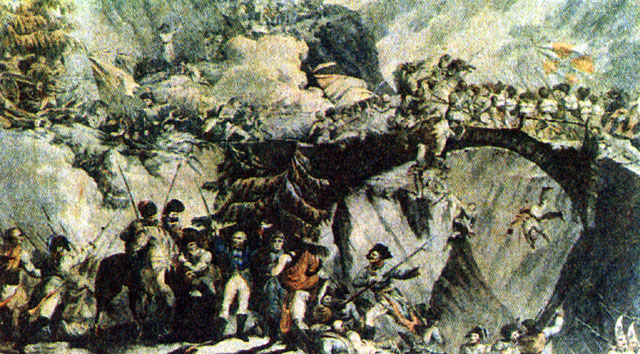
Suvorov Crossing the Devil's Bridge by Robert Ker Porter (1777 (Note: Most sources (including DNB, 1885–1900) give 1777; however, the monument to Porter in Smolenskoe Lutheran Cemetery bears the date 1781.)–1842)

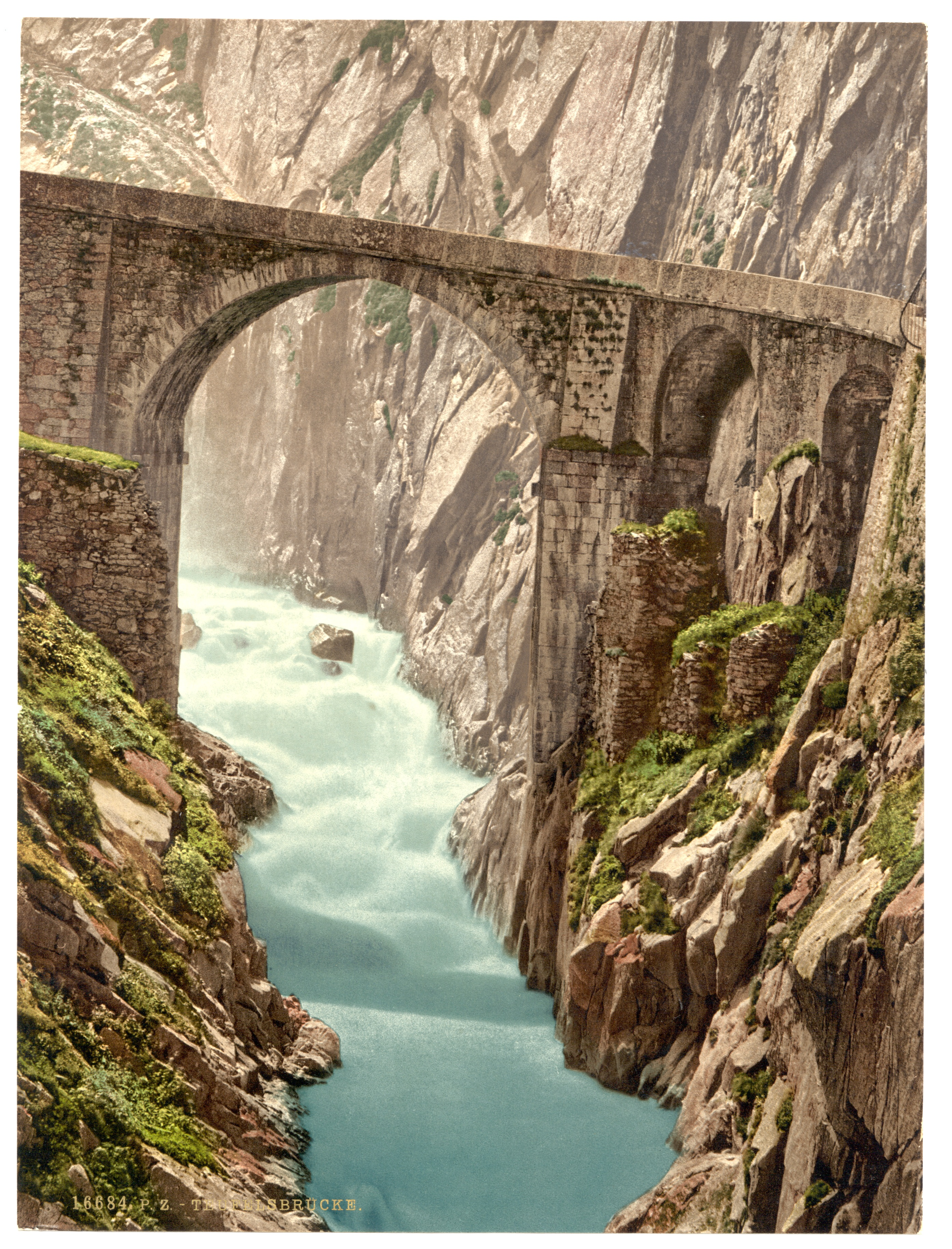
The Devil's Bridge, St. Gotthard Pass.

== Prelude ==
In this space the river Reuss is rushes as if in a crevasse, between the mountains overhanging it; the water has a great fall, and coming down in several waterfalls; the stream roars, covered with foam, and its roar can be heard far around. The centre of this "wild picture" is the Devil's Bridge, boldly thrown over the precipice, 75 feet above the water. The bridge, about 30 paces long, consisted of two stone arches; the larger one connected the right bank with the prominent rock of the left, the smaller one connected this rock with the left bank. From the bridge the road makes a steep turn; continuing to wind in a ribbon through the gorge, it passes several times from one bank to another and only before the village of Göschenen does it "breaks out of the gloomy crevice into the light of God". If a number of these narrow passages had been protected by small but sufficient forces, especially by artillery, and the defence had been vigorous, the attack could not have been successful for Suvorov, and a badly thought out attack would have resulted in heavy losses. Fortunately for the Russians, the attacker's orders were solid and the Republicans' defence was weak.

It may be inferred from a comparison of various descriptions that the French had only 1 cannon, and even if a few more, they were of the smallest calibre. Whether in the hope of the position impregnability, or owing to the late arrival at the place of defence and the inevitable bustle, but they did not prepare the bridge destruction before the attackers appeared. It was guarded by 2 French battalions; they were led by Colonel Daumas.

== Battle ==
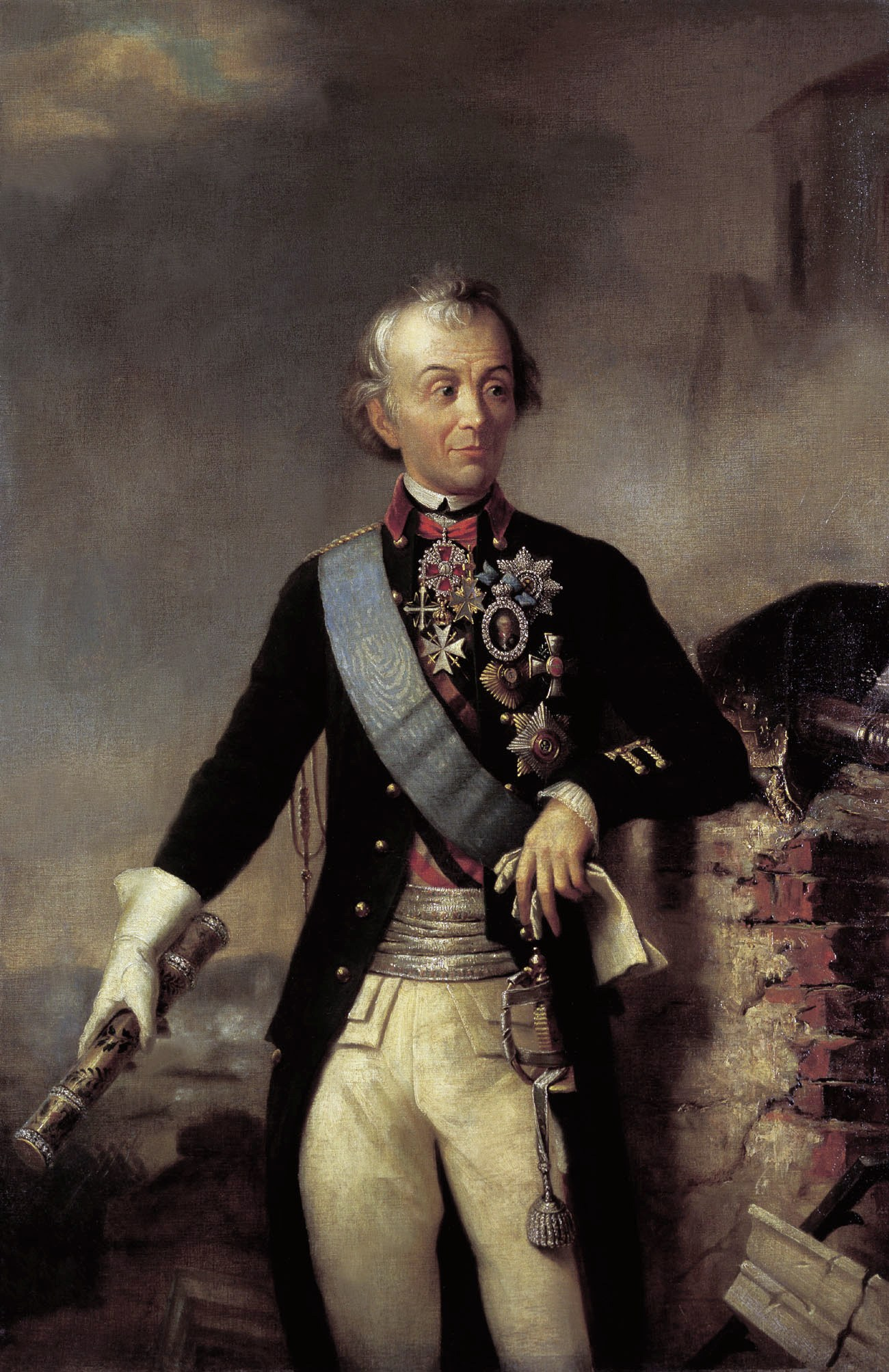
Suvorov with a baton

There were two flank movements: a detachment of 300 men was sent to the right, into the mountains above the Urner-Loch tunnel (today Urnerloch); another detachment of 200 men was ordered to cross the rocky bed of the Reuss toward the other side and threaten the flank and rear of the French position beyond the river. Both these manoeuvres belonged to the number of those which are caused only by case of emergency, but both of them, owing to the troop energy, succeeded completely. Major Trevogin with 200 jaegers descended to the stream with great effort and, overcoming even greater difficulties, began to cross the Reuss. The water was not deep,—knee-deep and only in some places waist-deep, but the main danger lay in the swiftness of flow. On reaching the shore, the men began to climb up steep, seemingly inaccessible slopes. In view of the success of this risky crossing, a whole battalion was sent in the footsteps of this team, which, not without losses crossed the river in a long front, so that a considerable force was on the other side. It took not a little time to cross and then to move to the rear and flank of the French position, so that Colonel Trubnikov's column, sent to bypass the Urner-Loch, fulfilled its task earlier. As soon as his men appeared on the slopes of the cliffs behind the tunnel, the French were in a state of confusion and hastily began to destroy the bridge.

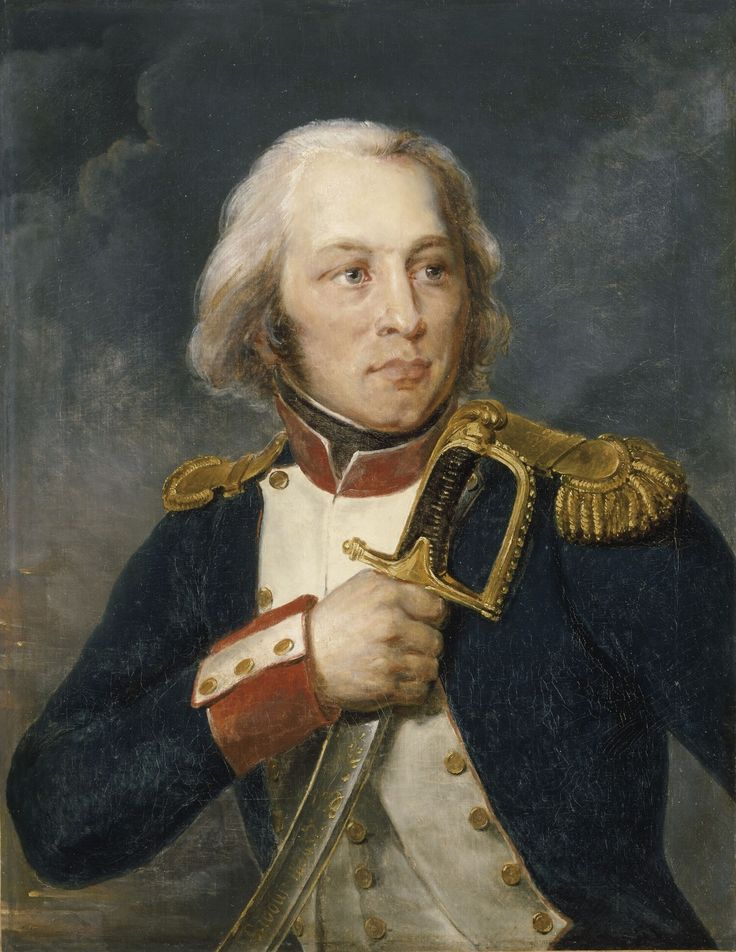
Général de division Lecourbe

The cannon guarded the entrance to the Urner-Loch, where a fierce combat was fought on the same day. The French saved their cannon from Russian hands by throwing it into the river. The Russians rushed to the bridge; the main arch remained untouched, but instead of the second arch, there was a wide and deep gaping hole: the French had already managed, in spite of the Russian riflemen fire on the right bank, to block the way of the advancing enemy. There was a skirmish between both banks, which did not bring affair to an end, as it was impossible to repair the bridge under point-blank fire. By this time, however, the Russian troops who had forded to the French side had managed to ford a path through the mountainous heights of the left bank and began to descend towards the bridge. They were an impressive force, because General Kamensky, who had received orders to cross the Betzberg ridge in the evening and follow Lecourbe to bypass the Urner-Loch and the Devil's Bridge, happened to be with them. The French could not hold on long in this place and began to retreat, while the left-bank Russian troops under Kamensky pursued them. Retreat became inevitable for the French also because, according to the campaign's general plan, the Austrian general Auffenberg, having descended from Disentis by the Maderanertal, occupied Amsteg (now Silenen) on the Reuss and knocked out from there an insignificant French detachment; thus he found himself at the French rear. Although Lecourbe forced Auffenberg to withdraw along the Maderanertal, the Austrians still remained close by, maintaining a threatening position.

As soon as it became clear that the French intended to retreat from the bridge, the Russians of the right bank rushed forward and began to make a hasty crossing over the ruined arch. They dismantled a nearby shed, dragged logs and planks, threw them over the dip and began to reinforce them with whatever they could find; Major Prince Meshchersky 1st used his officer's scarf for this purpose, and after him other officers did the same. When the shaky and narrow bridges thrown over the rockslide formed some semblance of a crossing, the brave men began to cross, helping each other; some were cut off and crushed, others were killed or wounded, for the retreating French were still firing at the bridge. Soon the French shots fell silent or did not reach the bridge, and the temporary crossing became more passable, but it hardly helped the Russians to strengthen their pursuit, because it required a great deal of time for a small number of men; the assembled detachment of Kamensky was more terrible and dangerous to the French. Immediately the pioneers set about carefully repairing the damaged portion of the bridge, and at 5 o'clock the whole delayed column of Russian troops moved forward.

== Resume ==
The action at the Devil's Bridge lasted for a rather short time and did not cause great losses to either side, but it must be assumed that the French had more men out of action, as part of their advanced detachment was annihilated, and Kamensky's detachment killed over 200 men on the mountains and along the road. The small loss of the attacker depended on a well-combined attack and on a weak defence, which in turn was due to the inadequate French means and the rapid Russian advance. This weak defence and especially the incomplete spoilage of the Devil's Bridge, gave some reason to conclude that Lecourbe lured Suvorov deeper into the Reuss valley, from where the Russians had no way out and where they should therefore perish. Consideration of this suffers from tension, because Lecourbe was not at all to grandiose plans: he himself risked to be cut off and surrounded and cared only about getting out of his predicament. Suvorov's small army continued its advance.

== See also ==
- Battle of Cassano
- First Battle of Marengo
- Battle of the Trebbia
- Battle of Novi
- Battle of the Gotthard Pass
- Battle of the Klöntal
- Battle of the Muotatal
- Battle of Näfels

== Sources ==
- Duffy, Christopher (1999). Eagles Over the Alps: Suvorov in Italy and Switzerland, 1799. Chicago, Illinois: The Emperor's Press. ISBN 978-1883476182.
- Bodart, Gaston (1908). Militär-historisches Kriegs-Lexikon (1618-1905). Vienna and Leipzig: C. W. Stern.
- Petrushevsky, Alexander (1884). "Швейцарская кампания: С. Готар, Чортов мост; 1799" [Swiss Campaign: Saint-Gotthard, Devil's Bridge; 1799]. Генералиссимус князь Суворов [Generalissimo Prince Suvorov] (in Russian). Vol. 3 (1st ed.). Saint Petersburg: Типография М. М. Стасюлевича. pp. 239–243.
- Golitsyn, Nikolay Sergeevich (1875). Всеобщая военная история новейших времен. Часть 2 [Universal military history of the modern times. Part 2] (in Russian). St. Petersburg: Типография Товарищества "Общественная Польза". pp. 342–347.
