= Battle of Gotthard Pass =

War of the Second Coalition battle, 1799

Battles at the Saint-Gotthard
- Part of Suvorov's Swiss campaign in the war of the Second Coalition
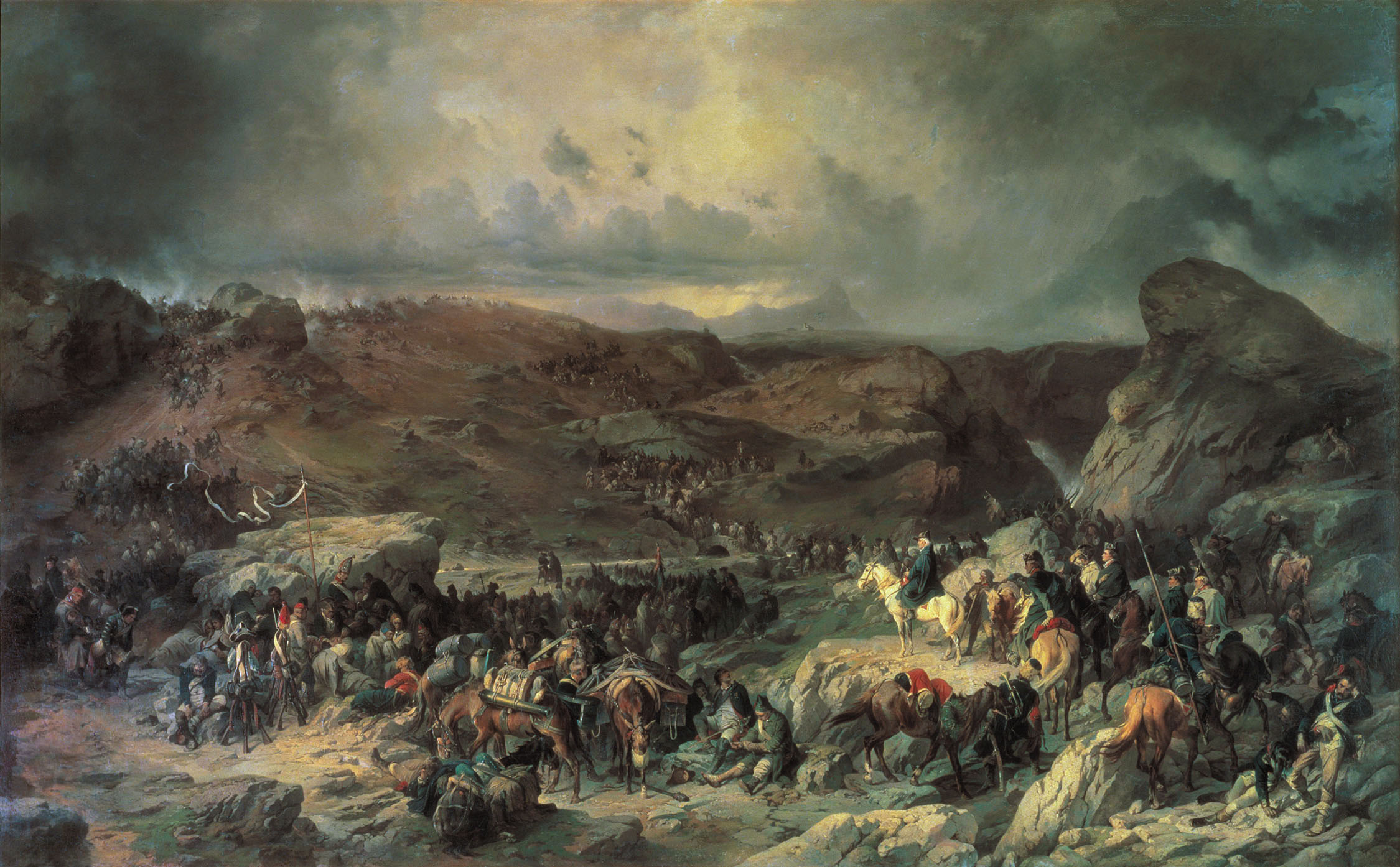
- Suvorov's army crosses St. Gotthard Pass in 1799 by Alexander Kotzebue
Date	23–27 September 1799 (O.S. — 12–16 September)
Location	Gotthard Massif, Swiss Alps, Helvetic Republic 46°33′22.5″N 8°34′4″E
Result	Russo-Austrian victory

Belligerents
Russia; Austria	France

Commanders and leaders
(Russian Empire) Alexander Suvorov (Russian Empire) Andrei Rosenberg (Russian Empire) Iosif Trubnikov (Russian Empire) Vasily Svishchov (Russian Empire) Nikolay Kamensky (Russian Empire) Fyodor Trevogin (Holy Roman Empire) Franz Auffenberg (Holy Roman Empire) Gottfried Strauch	(France) Claude Lecourbe (France) Charles Gudin (France) Louis Henri Loison (France) Col. Daumas

Strength
21,000–23,285 (Russian Empire) 19,000–21,285 (Note: 19,000; 21,285) (Holy Roman Empire) 6,500–9,180 total (Note: 6,500; 9,180) (Holy Roman Empire) ~2,000 engaged 6,700 involved in the St. Gotthard Pass and at the Devil's Bridge	7,501–9,000; 10,100–11,599 including 2,599 unengaged troops (Note: 7,501; 8,660; 9,000) 6,000 involved in the St. Gotthard Pass and at the Devil's Bridge

Casualties and losses
2,000–6,000 including the St. Gotthard Pass, Oberalpsee, Hospital, Urseren valley, Devil's Bridge (Note: Smith's 2,000 losses refer to the military operations from 24 to 27 September; Clodfelter's 2,000 casualties refer to 23 – 27 September, it includes the St. Gotthard Pass and Devil's Bridge over the Reuss River; 6,000 from 23 to 27 September at the St. Gotthard Pass, Oberalpsee, Hospital, Urseren, Devil's Bridge)	2,000 including the St. Gotthard Pass, Oberalpsee, Hospital, Urseren valley, Devil's Bridge; 10 guns
- Location within Europe

War of the Second Coalition:
Austria
The color black indicates the current battle.

The battle of (the) Gotthard Pass, also known as the battle of the St. Gotthard Pass or the battle of the St. Gotthard (Russian: Сражение за Сен-Готард; 24 September 1799), saw an Imperial Russian army commanded by Field Marshal Alexander Suvorov supported by two Austrian brigades attack a French division under General of Division Claude Lecourbe. The same day brought clashes at the Oberalp Pass (Oberalpsee) and Hospental (archaic Hospital).

The Austro-Russian army successfully captured the Gotthard Pass after stiff fighting on the first day. Suvorov's main body was assisted by a Russian flanking column led by Lieutenant General Andrei Rosenberg and a smaller Austrian flanking column under General-major Franz Xaver von Auffenberg. The next day, Suvorov's army fought its way north along the upper Reuss River valley past the Teufelsbrücke (Devil's Bridge) in Schöllenen Gorge. By 26 September the army reached Altdorf near Lake Lucerne. The term summarises a total of five battles or engagements between Airolo and Altdorf fought against the retreating French troops over the course of three days. The main engagement of 25 September is known as the battle of the Devil's Bridge. Simultaneously, the combat of the Urnerloch took place. As per military historian Gaston Bodart, the entire confrontation between 23 and 27 September is called the battles at the Saint-Gotthard.

Suvorov's offensive was part of a misbegotten Allied strategy that planned to unite the Russian armies of Suvorov and Lieutenant General Alexander Korsakov near Zürich. Together with Austrian and Swiss forces led by Feldmarschall-Leutnant Friedrich Freiherr von Hotze, they would sweep General of Division André Masséna's French Army of Helvetia from Switzerland. However, on 25–26 September, Masséna drubbed Korsakov in the Second Battle of Zurich and General of Division Jean-de-Dieu Soult defeated Hotze in the Battle of Linth River. Two smaller Austrian columns were also turned back by French forces. Instead of advancing to help Allied forces, Suvorov's army was marching into a mountainous country controlled by French troops.

== Background ==
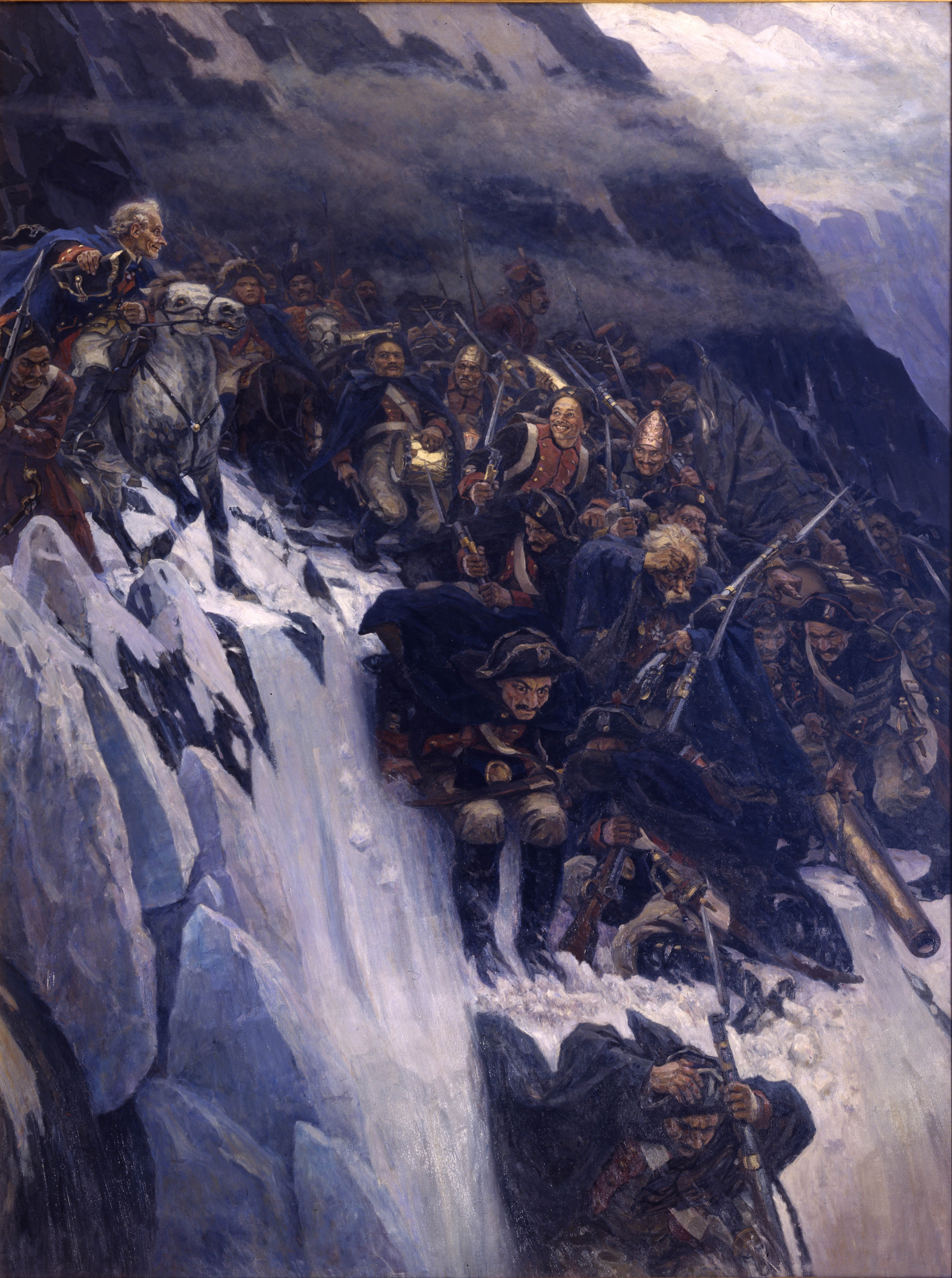
Suvorov crossing the Alps in 1799 (Переход Суворова через Альпы в 1799 году) by Vasily Surikov (1899)

=== New strategy ===
On 15 August 1799 at the Battle of Novi, the Austro-Russian army commanded by Field Marshal Suvorov defeated a French army led by General of Division Barthélemy Catherine Joubert, who was killed. Aside from capturing the fortress of Tortona from the French on 11 September, Suvorov did not exploit his victory. He blamed the Austrians for not providing enough wagons and food, but in fact the Allied army had suffered serious losses at Novi. The Austrians alone sustained 6,050 casualties, while the Russians lost at least 1,880 and possibly as many as 2,700. Soon there were reports that Lecourbe had captured the Gotthard Pass to the north. Suvorov sent some troops in that direction, but they returned after it was determined that the French did not intend to follow up their success.

In mid-1799, Allied strategists made a monumental strategic miscalculation. William Grenville, 1st Baron Grenville was the British Secretary of State for Foreign and Commonwealth Affairs serving with Prime Minister William Pitt the Younger. Grenville authored a scheme in which Korsakov with 45,000 Russians would be joined in Switzerland by Suvorov and 20,000 Russians advancing north from Italy. Suvorov would take command of the combined army and drive Masséna's French army from western Switzerland. In a second impulse, Suvorov would invade Franche-Comté, an area of France sparsely defended by frontier fortresses. Once Korsakov was securely in position in central Switzerland, Feldzeugmeister Archduke Charles, Duke of Teschen would march his 60,000 troops north into Germany, leaving 18,000 Austrians under Hotze to cooperate with the Russians. Charles would thrust across the lower Rhine from southern Germany into France while a second Austrian army under General der Kavallerie Michael von Melas would invade Savoy from Italy. On the North Sea coast, an Anglo-Russian army would land in the Batavian Republic, a French satellite. Meanwhile, British agent William Wickham would raise an army of 20,000 pro-Allied Swiss troops.

On 8 June 1799, the plan was sent to Emperor Paul I of Russia, who approved it. Emperor Francis and his foreign minister Johann Amadeus von Thugut accepted the plan because it came to them from Emperor Paul and it was a convenient reason to get Suvorov out of Italy. Cracks were appearing in the alliance as Russia and Austria became mistrustful of each other's war aims. Grenville's plan was revealed to Archduke Charles on 7 August. Anxious about Korsakov's Russians, Charles stated, "I don't know how they will manage, especially if we take ourselves off any distance". Korsakov was alarmed when the plan was disclosed to him on 12 August. The Russian general remarked that he had 28,000 fit troops rather than the 45,000 presumed by the strategists. On 25 August Suvorov received his orders from Emperor Francis to take his army into Switzerland. The Russian commander requested a two-month delay, but Francis demanded that Suvorov move immediately. Thugut also insisted that Charles take his army out of Switzerland at once.

Hotze underestimated Massena's numbers at 60,000 French and Swiss troops; in fact, there were 76,000. The Army of Condé with 6,000 French Royalists was on the march from Russia but would not be available until 1 October. Wickham was only able to recruit 2,000 Swiss soldiers. Historian Christopher Duffy judged that the "strategy foundered on crucial issues of numbers, geography, direction and timing". Bad timing proved fatal to the enterprise. Charles left Switzerland too early and Suvorov arrived in Switzerland too late. This left Korsakov and Hotze in a vulnerable position to face Masséna's French army.

=== Plans ===
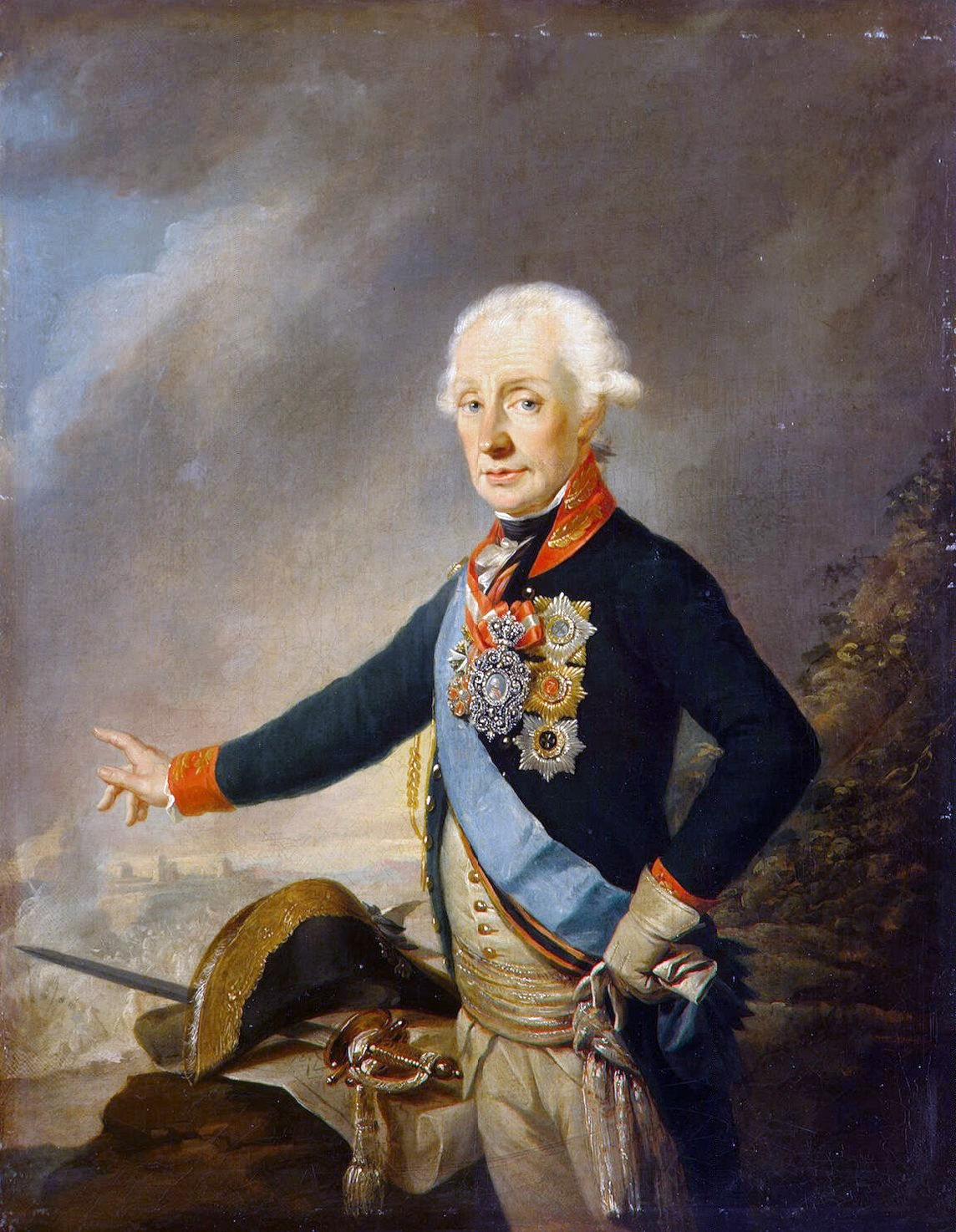
Alexander Suvorov

In early September, the Allied generals began planning to implement their governments' strategy. At that time, Korsakov's 28,000 Russians held Zürich and the east bank of the Limmat and Aare Rivers as far as the Rhine River. Hotze's command was split into two divisions. He personally accompanied 8,000 troops along the lower Linth between Lake Zurich and the Walensee. The second 10,000-man division under Feldmarschall-Leutnant Friedrich von Linkin was farther south and east. Linkin's command was split into three brigades under General-majors Franz Jellacic, Joseph Anton von Simbschen, and Franz Xaver von Auffenberg. According to Duffy, Jellacic with 4,500 soldiers held Sargans, Simbschen with 3,500 troops was along the Vorderrhein valley, and Auffenburg with 2,000 was at Disentis. Linkin accompanied Simbschen's brigade and Auffenburg was detailed to help Suvorov. Colonel Gottfried von Strauch led a 4,570-man Austrian brigade that was at the foot of the Gotthard Pass. This brigade belonged to Karl Joseph Hadik von Futak's corps from the Allied Army of Italy. Historian Ramsay Weston Phipps credited Strauch with 6,000 soldiers and Auffenberg with 3,180 men.

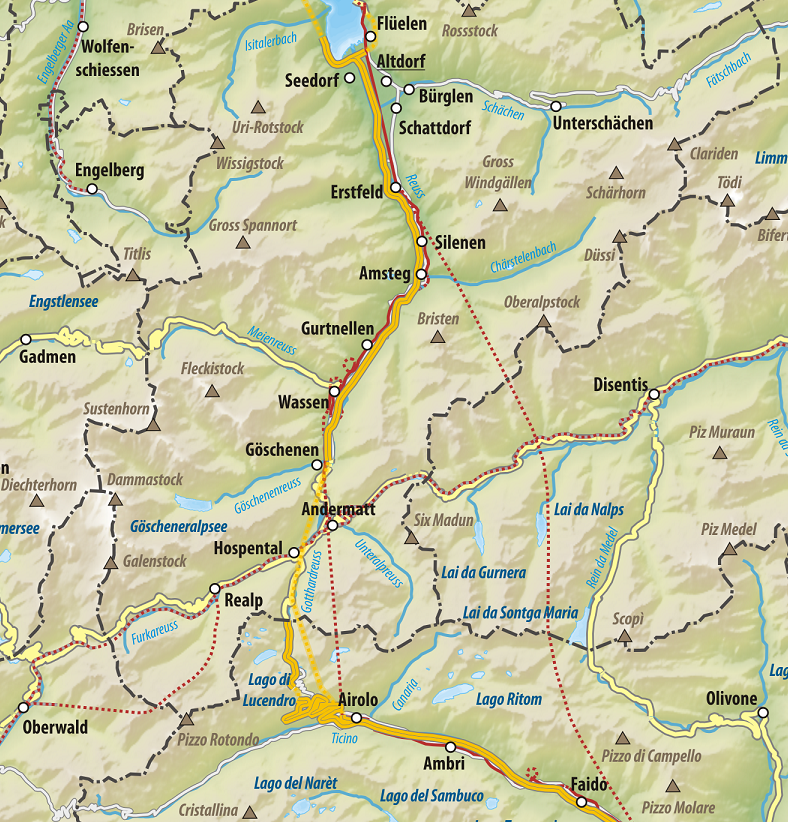
On 24 September 1799 in the Battle of Gotthard Pass, Suvorov's main body attacked from Airolo toward Hospental while Rosenberg's corps advanced west from Disentis toward Andermatt. Auffenberg's brigade moved north from Disentis into the Charstelenbach valley to threaten Amsteg.

There were several routes that Suvorov's army could take to intervene in Switzerland. Farthest east was the route past Lake Como and over the Maloja Pass, though it involved a large detour. The next route farther west was over the Splügen Pass at 2,113 metres (6,932 ft) elevation. Both of these routes could accommodate wagons and cannons. The route farthest to the west was across the Simplon Pass. The good road over it was not built until 1805. Suvorov decided to take the Gotthard Pass because it offered a well-known and direct route to a rendezvous with Korsakov and Hotze. The pass had a pack road which could be used by a mule train, but wagons and medium cannons were out of the question. The Gotthard Pass was known to be occupied by the French and it appealed to "Suvorov's instinct for direct action". The Allies hoped to assault the Gotthard Pass as early as 19 September.

The Allied plan included the accumulation of ten days of food and 1,429 mules at Bellinzona by the Austrians. But even these would only provide Suvorov's army a few days of supplies. Suvorov counted on Korsakov and Hotze amassing supplies for his troops in Switzerland. For the expedition, Suvorov took Lieutenant Colonel Franz von Weyrother as his chief of staff as well as eight additional Austrian staff officers. On 7 September, the Russians prepared for their march to the Gotthard Pass. A French sortie delayed the Russians for a few days, but they soon began a force march that took them as far as Taverne on 15 September. The Austrians managed to gather the required number of mules, but someone failed to send sufficient funds to pay the muleteers and another officer mistakenly held up a mule train at Pavia. Without pay, the muleteers deserted with their animals so that there were only 340 mules collected at Bellinzona.

After days of enforced idleness, Suvorov accepted Grand Duke Constantine's idea to dismount 1,500 of his Cossacks and use their horses as pack animals. This was a difficult choice because the Cossacks' mounts were their own property, not army issue. Suvorov organized his army into two corps under Generals Wilhelm Derfelden and Andrei Rosenberg. Derfelden's 8,591-man corps consisted of General-major Pyotr Bagration's Advance Guard (2,394), Lieutenant General Yakov Ivanovich Povalo-Schveikovsky's infantry division (4,360), and 1,837 Cossacks. Rosenberg's 10,901-man corps included General-major Mikhail Miloradovich's infantry division (5,339), Lieutenant General Ivan Ivanovich Förster's infantry division (2,982), the Kashkin Jäger Regiment (697), and 1,883 Cossacks. For the assault on the Gotthard Pass, Förster's division would temporarily act with Derfelden's corps. The artillery was armed with 25 Piedmontese light 2-pounder cannons. Unable to traverse the Gotthard Pass, the Russian artillery convoy took the Maloja Pass route according to Duffy or the Splügen Pass according to Phipps.

On 19 September, Rosenberg's corps left Taverne for Bellinzona. On 21 September, these troops turned right into the Blenio Valley at Biasca. Rosenberg's troops crossed the Lukmanier Pass on 23 September and reached Disentis in the Vorderrhein valley. The troops marched in heavy rain and a number of both men and horses were killed in falls when crossing the pass. Rosenberg's column numbered 6,000 troops and 10 light cannons. Derfelden's corps left Bellinzona on 22 September amid heavy rains, after having started from Taverne the previous day. At Biasca, the column continued up the Ticino valley and by the evening of 23 September reached the town of Faido. Strauch's Austrians joined Derfelden's column along the way.

== Campaign of September 24–26 ==
=== 24 September (Battles of the Gotthard/Oberalp passes and Hospental) ===
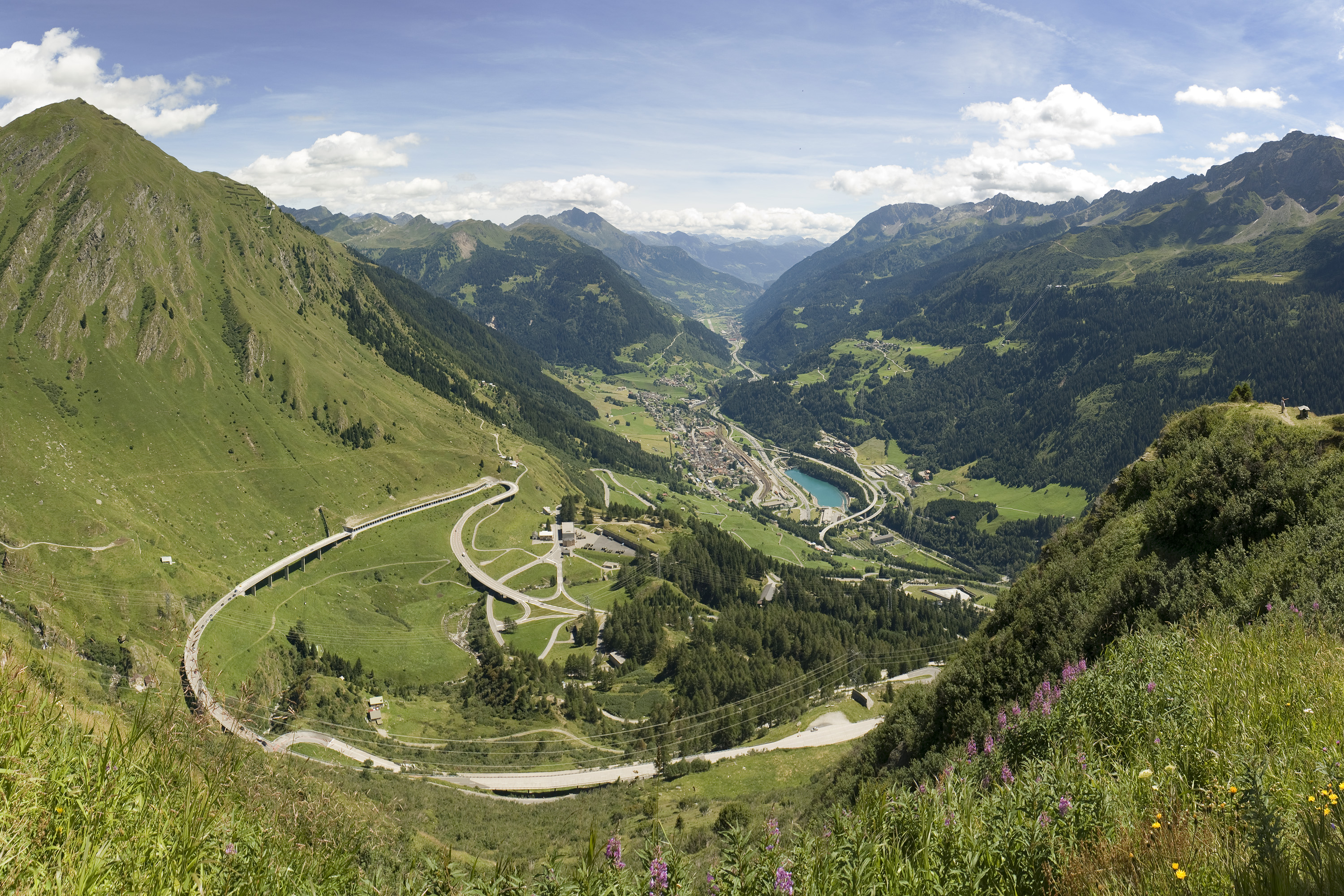
The photo shows Airolo and the Ticino valley at the foot of Gotthard Pass. The hamlet of Cima del Bosco is just beyond the hairpin curve.

Lecourbe's division consisted of three brigades under Generals of Brigade Charles-Étienne Gudin de La Sablonnière, Louis Henri Loison, and Gabriel Jean Joseph Molitor. By Duffy's reckoning, Gudin's brigade numbered 3,801 men and consisted of the 67th and 109th Line Infantry Demi-brigades and three grenadier companies. Loison's brigade was 2,980-strong and was made up of the 38th and 76th Line Infantry Demi-brigades. Lecourbe was in Altdorf at the northern end of the upper Reuss valley with the 720-man divisional reserve of nine grenadier companies. Molitor's brigade was far to the east near Glarus on the upper Linth River. The 67th Line defended the Gotthard Pass, the 109th Line held the Oberalp Pass and the village of Andermatt, and Loison's brigade was posted near Amsteg in the center of the upper Reuss valley. Phipps credited Gudin with 4,294 soldiers and Loison with 4,366 men.

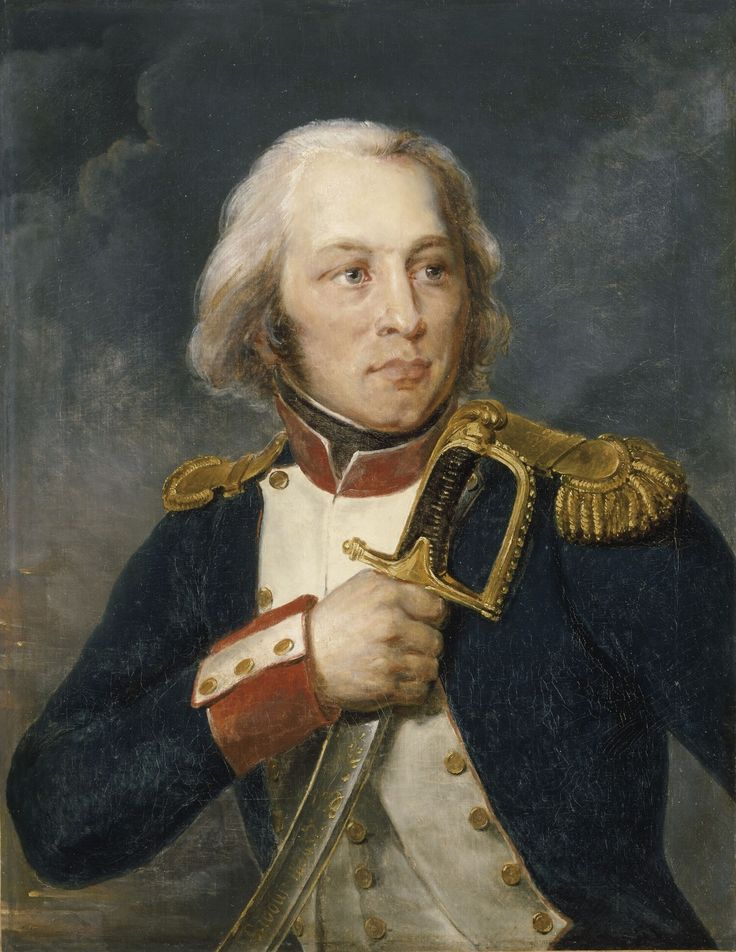
Claude Lecourbe

Massena ordered Lecourbe to advance east on 25 September as part of a general offensive against the Allies. Suvorov was about to assault Lecourbe from the south, catching his opponent off-balance. As early as 5 September, rumors reached the French that Suvorov was coming north with 25,000 troops, but Lecourbe discounted the stories. His patrols detected Strauch's Austrians in the Ticino valley and from 20 September there were even reports of Russian soldiers nearby. Lecourbe put Gudin's brigade on alert, but did not budge from his headquarters in Altdorf. In previous campaigns, Lecourbe proved himself a capable general in mountain fighting, but this time he found himself poorly prepared for Suvorov's impending attack.

Suvorov's plan of attack for 24 September called for the main effort by Derfelden's Russians and Strauch's Austrians against the Gotthard Pass. This thrust would be assisted by a right-hook by Rosenberg's Russians across the Oberalp Pass that would seize Andermatt north of the Gotthard. Auffenberg's Austrians would make a deeper right hook and block the upper Reuss valley at Amsteg. The 67th Line with 1,861 soldiers was divided into three groupings, at Airolo, at the hamlet of Cima del Bosco near the entrance to the Val Tremola, and at the pass itself. The attackers must climb 916 metres (3,005 ft) from Airolo to the pass. This hike might take an unencumbered person two and a half hours, but the Russians and Austrians would have to carry a musket, ammunition, battle gear, and full haversack with French firearms blazing in their faces.

The advance to the foot of the Gotthard Pass fell badly behind schedule so that the attack did not start until 2:00 pm. The French quickly abandoned Airolo and established themselves in improvised defenses on the slopes above. For the assault on the Gotthard, Suvorov split the main body into three columns. The right column consisted of Bagration's advance guard followed by Schveikovsky's division. It climbed the right side of the valley, aiming for Cima del Bosco. Bagration's orders called for detaching four battalions over the mountain to gain the pass by a flanking move. The center column was made up of Förster's division and two battalions of the Austrian Wallis Infantry Regiment. It advanced directly up the Val Tremola. The left column was formed from the Russian Veletsky Infantry Regiment and the remainder of Strauch's Austrian brigade. Its assignment was to block the valley leading west to prevent any interference from French troops under General of Division Louis Marie Turreau.

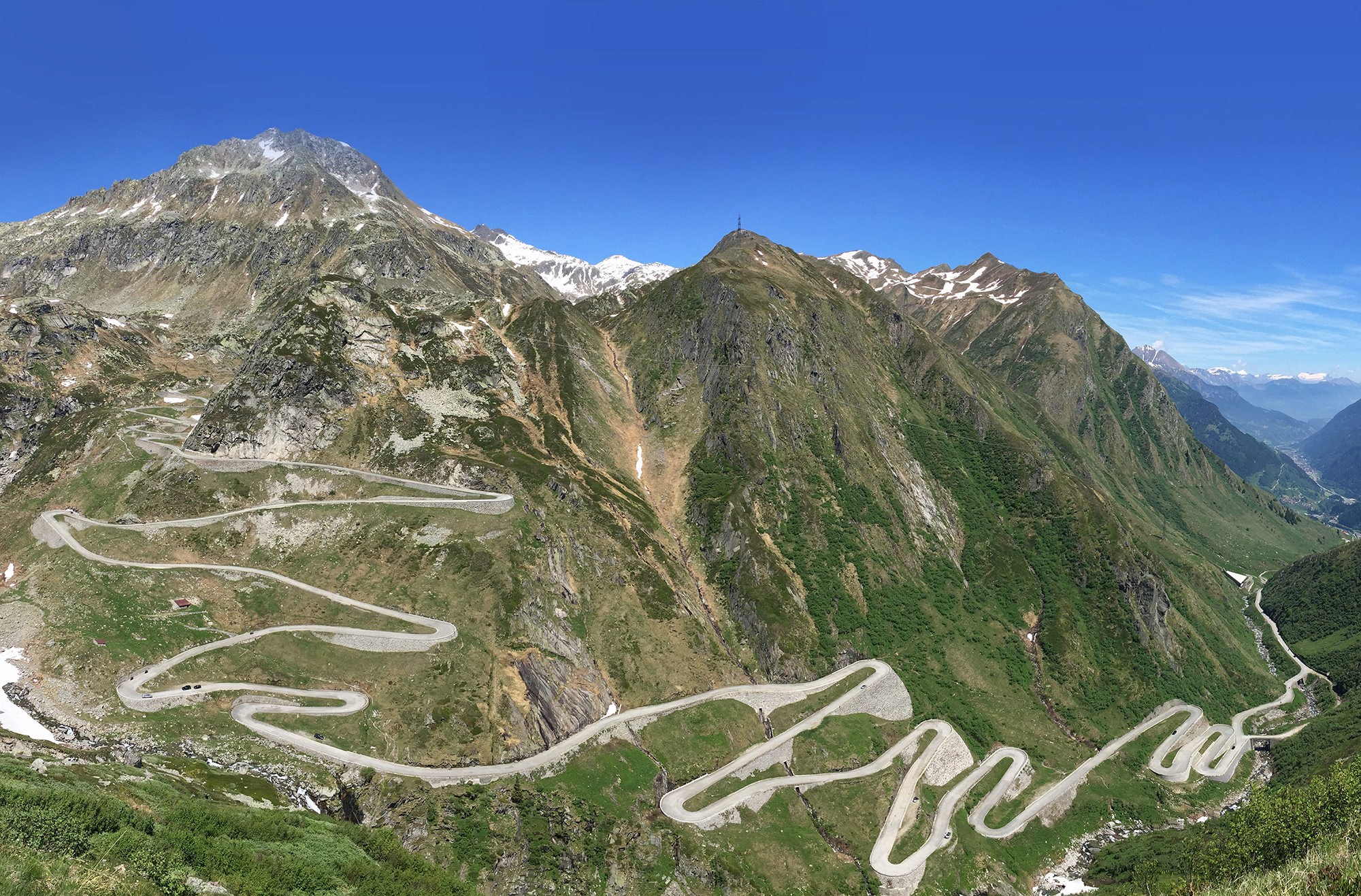
The modern road zig-zags up the Val Tremola toward the Gotthard Pass.

The assault ran into fierce French resistance at once. The 250 Russian Jägers forming the apex of the attack lost 150 men as casualties. Schveikovsky's division inexplicably veered downhill into the valley and the Russian attack stalled. Seeing his soldiers falter, Suvorov lay down in a ditch and asked to be buried. He announced, "You are no longer my children, and I am no longer your father. There is nothing left to me but to die." The nearby Rosenberg Grenadiers rallied and insisted on continuing the attack. The story was denied by some, but it was just the sort of theatrics that Suvorov often used to inspire his troops. Strauch's brigade was recalled from the valley and sent uphill to give greater weight to the assault. The French finally abandoned Cima del Bosco and withdrew in good order up the Val Tremola. The French defenders waited behind cover until their attackers got close before emptying their muskets and falling back to the next position. The Allies finally fought their way to the top of the pass only to face the strongest defenses. Fortunately for the Allies, General-major Mikhail Semenovich Baranovsky with the Miller Jägers and Baranovsky Musketeers appeared above the pass, having scaled the steep slopes to the east. Fearing capture, the French quickly evacuated their positions and retreated to the north. The bitter fighting cost the Allies 1,200 casualties.

That day, Rosenberg's corps and Auffenberg's brigade marched from Disentis at dawn, heading west. The Austrians soon turned north to cross over the mountains and reach the Maderanertal, an alpine valley which led west to Amsteg. For the crossing, Auffenberg's brigade split into three separate columns, of which the middle one crossed the Chrüzli Pass. One battalion of the 109th Line defended the Oberalp Pass, with its main defense on the north side of the Oberalp Lake. Rosenberg sent the Mansurov Musketeers looping to the right. Miloradovich led the Kashkin Jägers to the left on a steep climb along the south side of the lake. Three regiments under Lieutenant General Maksim Vasilyevich Rehbinder made the main push in the center. Badly outnumbered, the French conducted a fighting retreat so that Rosenberg's troops did not reach Andermatt until the evening. The Russians claimed to have killed 180 Frenchmen and captured 41 at the cost of 150 killed and badly wounded. The 109th Line evacuated Andermatt and retreated southwest to Hospental.

That evening, Russian Jägers and Cossacks pursued the French across Gotthard Pass and down into the valley on the other side. At 9:00 pm, the Russians occupied Hospental. In the dark outside the village, Gudin assembled the 67th and 109th Line. He briefly sent his grenadiers against Hospental, but the Russians quickly pushed them back. With his retreat route to the north blocked by Rosenberg's troops, Gudin's only escape route led southwest toward Furka Pass. First, he bombarded the Russians with his two cannons and one howitzer before abandoning the guns and setting out for the Furka. Suvorov sent the Veletsky and Tyrtov Musketeers to follow Gudin until he was out of the area. It was important for Gudin to block the Furka and Grimsel Passes, but the move took his brigade out of the next two days' battle. Suvorov left Strauch's Austrians to defend the Gotthard and the valley at its base.

=== 25 September (Battles of the Devil's Bridge and the Urnerloch) ===
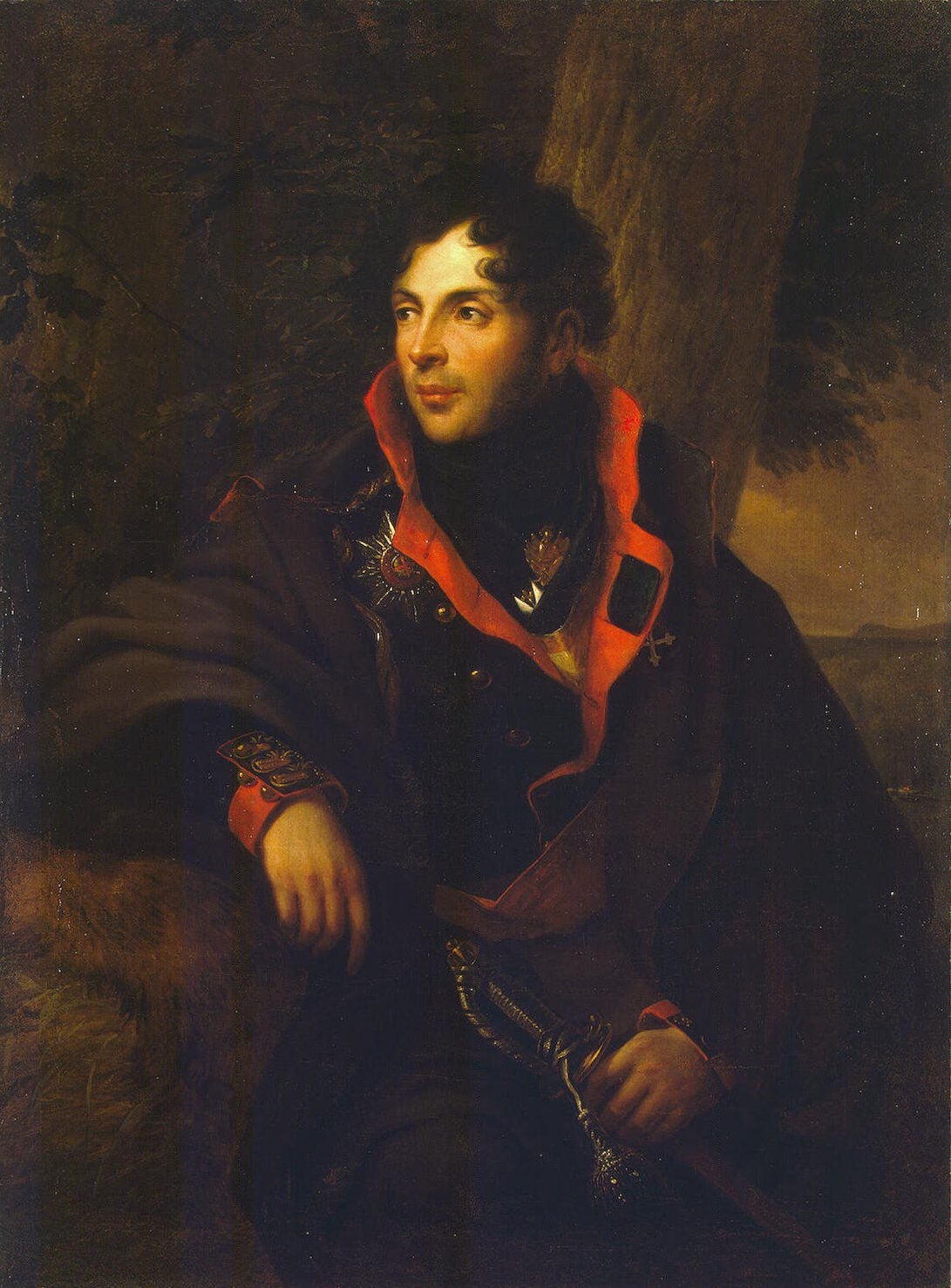
Nikolay Kamensky

Suvorov's troops set out from Hospental at 6:00 am, heading north toward Andermatt where they met Rosenberg's corps. A short distance north of Andermatt was the Schöllenen Gorge, a canyon so narrow that if the French had been present in sufficient strength, they might have held their ground indefinitely. One feature of the gorge was the Urnerloch, where in 1707, the Swiss dug a tunnel 65 metres (213 ft) long and 2.2 metres (7.2 ft) wide. The road from Andermatt led through the Urnerloch to the Teufelsbrücke (Devil's Bridge), built in 1595, which spanned the deep gorge. At 9:00 pm on 24 September, unaware that the Gotthard had already fallen, Lecourbe wrote a letter to Masséna, "I have just heard that the enemy are attacking us at Airolo. I imagine it is no more than a reconnaissance." He soon learned the truth. Leaving Altdorf the next day at 7:00 am, he arrived at the Devil's Bridge two hours later, where the battle was in progress.

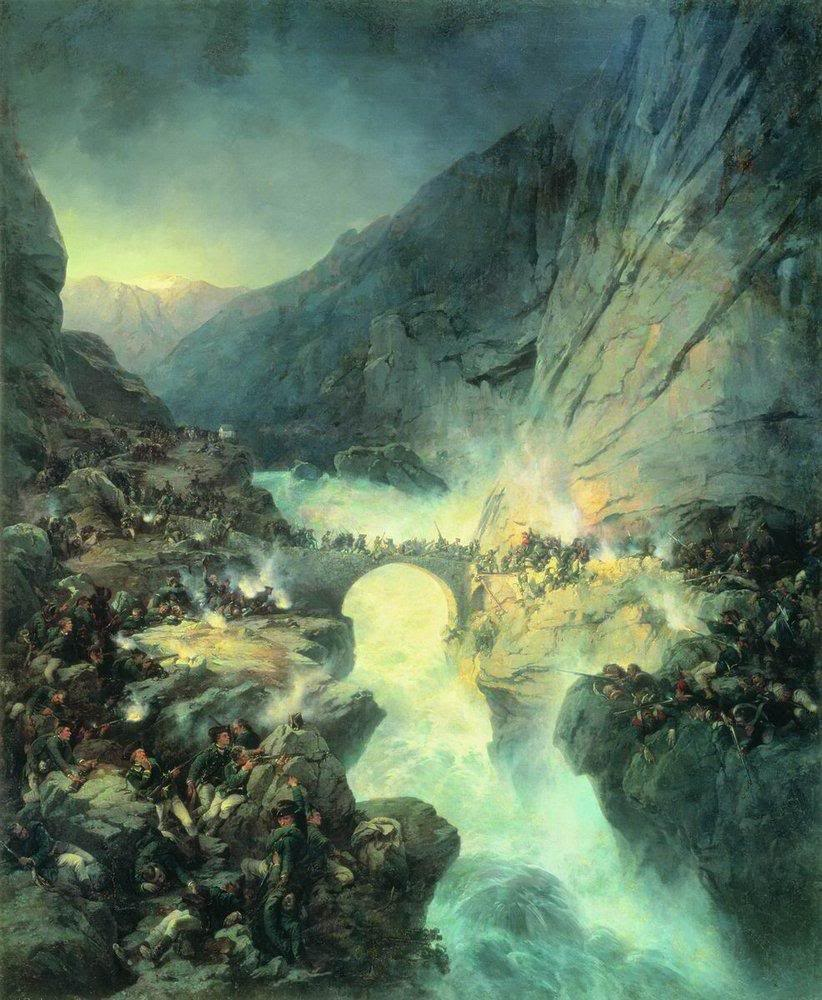
Battle on Devil's Bridge (Бой на Чертовом мосту) by Alexander von Kotzebue

In order to seize the Devil's Bridge, one battalion of the Rehbinder Musketeers under Colonel Vasily Ivanovich Svishchov and 200 men from the Kashkin Jägers under Major Fyodor Trevogin crossed to the west side of the gorge and climbed the Bäxberg heights to reach a path that led to the Devil's Bridge. General-major Nikolay Kamensky led the two battalions of the Kamensky Musketeers up the slope farther south, then followed the contour to come in on Svishchov's left. Finally, Colonel Iosif Petrovich Trubnikov took 300 men from the Mansurov Musketeers up the Nätschen Mountain on the right. General-major Mansurov led the remainder of the Mansorov and Rehbinder Musketeers directly against the Urnerloch, chasing the French skirmishers through the tunnel. The French blasted the Russians emerging from the tunnel with canister shot from a 4-pound cannon near the bridge. At 11:00 am, Lecourbe received warning that an enemy column was menacing Amsteg in his rear; it was Auffenberg's Austrians. The French general announced, "This body comes from Disentis. We must attack it. It is the left wing of Hotze. We are cut."

On 24 September, Auffenberg's brigade made a very strenuous hike across the mountains. One of his columns did not make it to the rendezvous by the evening, so the Austrian general decided to wait until the next day to move against Amsteg. The next morning, Auffenberg's men worked their way down the Maderanertal unopposed until within a half-hour march of Amsteg, when they bumped into two companies of the 38th Line. Amid the rocky course of the Charstelenbach stream, the French held up the Austrians for four hours. Finally, the Austrian infantry seized the bridge across the Charstelenbach. Auffenberg occupied Amsteg with two battalions and posted the other two battalions on the lower slopes of the Bristen Mountain, south of the stream. Auffenberg only partly damaged the bridge probably because he wanted to slow down the French when they retreated his way, but did not want to keep Suvorov from repairing it when the Russians arrived.

Once alerted to Auffenberg's threat to his rear, Lecourbe took 1,600 soldiers back to Amsteg. This detachment fatally weakened Loison's position at Devil's Bridge. The first French troops to appear near Amsteg were one battalion of the 76th Line and the grenadier reserve. They attacked the Austrians on Bristen Mountain. Unable to dislodge them, the French crossed the bridge and cleared the Austrians out of Amsteg with the help of the two companies of the 38th Line. Soon, the French were joined by two battalions of the 38th Line retreating from the Devil's Bridge. Auffenberg's brigade lost 18 killed, 56 wounded, and 155 captured on 25 September. At Schöllenen Gorge, Svishchov's men on the west bank drove back the French to the bridge. At this, the French on the east bank rolled the 4-pounder into the gorge and fell back across the bridge. Farther down the west bank, the French demolished part of the roadway and this held up the Russian advance until a passage could be improvised. Kamensky pressed the pursuit so that some French troops of the 76th Line were forced to retreat west from Göschenen into the mountains. The Russian pursuit ended at nightfall when the soldiers went into bivouac south of Amsteg. That evening Lecourbe burned the Amsteg bridge and retreated north to Seedorf.

The elaborate Allied strategy was wrecked on 25 September 1799. On that day, Massena attacked Korsakov in the Second Battle of Zurich and drove the Russians back into the city. That evening Korsakov found that his ally Hotze was dead and his force beaten in the Battle of Linth River by Jean-de-Dieu Soult's division. Korsakov and his generals appear to have "lost their heads" when they decided to break out of Zürich the next day and make for Eglisau on the Rhine. Suvorov had ordered Korsakov and Hotze to "stand like a wall", but Korsakov and Hotze's successor Franz Petrasch rapidly retreated to the north, ending near Lake Constance. The abandonment of the area would allow Masséna to turn against Suvorov.

=== 26 September ===
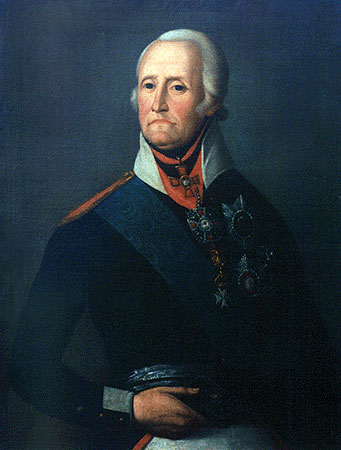
Andrei Rosenberg

Suvorov's leading units under Miloradovich joined Auffenberg's troops at Bristen Mountain at 6:00 am on 26 September. The battalion of the 76th Line that formed the French rearguard was unable to hold back the Allies who crossed the remnants of the Charstelenbach bridge at Amsteg. There was another skirmish in front of Altdorf before the French retreated to Seedorf on the west bank, covered by an attack from a column of grenadiers. Lecourbe worried that Suvorov's soldiers might break out of the upper Reuss valley to the west in an attempt to reach Lucerne. Therefore, he tried to keep the Allies confined to the east bank of the Reuss. He maintained two cannons in a small redoubt on the east bank near Seedorf. Lecourbe posted the 2nd Battalion of the 38th Line at Erstfeld and burned the bridge there and at Attinghausen. He even sent Loison with some troops west across the Surenen Pass to Engelberg. The Austrian Gradiscaner Grenz Infantry were ordered to cross the Reuss at Erstfeld but they found it impossible.

Rosenberg and Auffenberg entered Altdorf around noon where they pulled down the French flag - the "Tricolor of Liberty". Suvorov himself reached Altdorf at 6:00 pm where he was blessed by the priest. That night he slept in one of the few buildings in the town that survived a conflagration in April. Since leaving Taverne, the Russian army had marched a distance of 80 miles (129 km) in five days across extremely difficult terrain. Suvorov had every right to take pride in his achievement so far, but the Russian logistical arrangements were starting to break down. A depot of flour found at Andermatt was used up by Rosenberg's corps within one day and the all food stored at Altdorf was eaten by two battalions. The famished Russian soldiers were seen trying to chew on discarded animal skins. An attempt to requisition food in the neighborhood rounded up only 15 cattle. Suvorov determined to turn east from Altdorf up the Schächental and then north across the Kinzig Pass to Schwyz via Muotathal. He hoped that he would find a supply depot at Schwyz set up by Korsakov and Hotze.

Jellacic's Austrian column left Sargans on 24 September and marched south of the Walensee to seize Mollis. The following day, his troops tried without success to dislodge Molitor's brigade on the upper Linth River. On 26 September, Molitor launched a determined counterattack on Jellacic. When he found out about Hotze's defeat, Jellacic began a retreat which ended at Bad Ragaz in the Rhine valley. Meanwhile, Linkin's Austrians crossed the Panix Pass into the Sernftal and captured Schwanden on 26 September. Hearing of this second incursion, Molitor suspended his pursuit of Jellacic and hurried to deal with Linkin. Thus, the forces that Suvorov counted on to help him were being eliminated one by one. For his part, Masséna received a report from Lecourbe on 26 September that Suvorov captured the Gotthard Pass and would soon be at Altdorf. He immediately ordered General of Division Édouard Mortier to march to Schwyz with 7,800 soldiers and Soult's division to block the Linth valley.

== Aftermath ==
In the operations from 24 to 27 September 1799, the French and Allies forces each sustained losses of 2,000 killed, wounded, and missing. In addition, the French lost 10 guns when they were thrown into the Reuss River to prevent capture. On 27 September, Suvorov's army began crossing the Kinzig Pass to Muotathal where Bagration's advance guard wiped out a company of the 38th Line. Rosenberg's corps stayed in the upper Reuss valley to protect the train of mules and Cossack horses that were carrying the supplies. To keep the French off balance, Rosenberg mounted a feint against Erstfeld. At 5:00 pm that day, Lecourbe attacked Altdorf with seven companies, driving out the Fertsch Musketeers. Rosenberg soon counterattacked with the Tyrtov and Mansurov Musketeers, evicting the French from the town and clearing them from the east bank of the Reuss. On 28 September, Rosenberg's corps began crossing the Kinzig Pass in rain and snow while his rearguard under Förster held the Schächental behind him.

Early on 28 September 300 Cossacks led by an Austrian staff officer were sent from Muotathal up the Pragel Pass on a reconnaissance. They encountered a French outpost and the Austrian captain demanded its surrender. To his amazement the French replied that the Cossacks ought to surrender since Masséna had won a great victory and captured 20,000 Allied troops. Back in Muotathal, other disturbing reports were coming in and it was soon clear that Suvorov's army was marooned in Switzerland amid a victorious French army.

== Forces ==
=== Austro-Russian order of battle ===
Alexander Suvorov's Army on 12 September 1799
Corps	Division	Strength	Units	Strength
Corps Derfelden; General; Wilhelm Derfelden (8,591)	Advance Guard; General-major; Pyotr Bagration	2,394	(Russia) Bagration Jäger Regiment, 2 battalions	506
Corps Derfelden; General; Wilhelm Derfelden (8,591)	Advance Guard; General-major; Pyotr Bagration	2,394	(Russia) Miller Jäger Regiment, 2 battalions	496
Corps Derfelden; General; Wilhelm Derfelden (8,591)	Advance Guard; General-major; Pyotr Bagration	2,394	(Russia) Dendrygin Grenadier Battalion	339
Corps Derfelden; General; Wilhelm Derfelden (8,591)	Advance Guard; General-major; Pyotr Bagration	2,394	(Russia) Lomonosov Grenadier Battalion	330
Corps Derfelden; General; Wilhelm Derfelden (8,591)	Advance Guard; General-major; Pyotr Bagration	2,394	(Russia) Sanaev Grenadier Battalion	326
Corps Derfelden; General; Wilhelm Derfelden (8,591)	Advance Guard; General-major; Pyotr Bagration	2,394	(Russia) Kalemin Grenadier Battalion	397
Corps Derfelden; General; Wilhelm Derfelden (8,591)	Lieutenant General; Yakov Ivanovich Povalo-Schveikovsky	4,360	(Russia) Rosenberg Grenadier Regiment, 2 battalions	911
Corps Derfelden; General; Wilhelm Derfelden (8,591)	Lieutenant General; Yakov Ivanovich Povalo-Schveikovsky	4,360	(Russia) Schveikovsky Musketeer Regiment, 2 battalions	921
Corps Derfelden; General; Wilhelm Derfelden (8,591)	Lieutenant General; Yakov Ivanovich Povalo-Schveikovsky	4,360	(Russia) Baranovsky Musketeer Regiment, 2 battalions	1,479
Corps Derfelden; General; Wilhelm Derfelden (8,591)	Lieutenant General; Yakov Ivanovich Povalo-Schveikovsky	4,360	(Russia) Kamensky Musketeer Regiment, 2 battalions	1,049
Corps Derfelden; General; Wilhelm Derfelden (8,591)	Cossacks	1,837	(Russia) Sychov Cossack Regiment	480
Corps Derfelden; General; Wilhelm Derfelden (8,591)	Cossacks	1,837	(Russia) 1st Posdeev Cossack Regiment	462
Corps Derfelden; General; Wilhelm Derfelden (8,591)	Cossacks	1,837	(Russia) Semernikov Cossack Regiment	431
Corps Derfelden; General; Wilhelm Derfelden (8,591)	Cossacks	1,837	(Russia) Molchanov Cossack Regiment	464
Corps Rosenberg; General; Andrei Rosenberg (10,901)	Advance Guard	697	(Russia) Kashkin Jäger Regiment, 2 battalions	697
Corps Rosenberg; General; Andrei Rosenberg (10,901)	General-major; Mikhail Miloradovich	5,339	(Russia) Miloradovich Musketeer Regiment, 2 battalions	1,043
Corps Rosenberg; General; Andrei Rosenberg (10,901)	General-major; Mikhail Miloradovich	5,339	(Russia) Rehbinder Musketeer Regiment, 2 battalions	1,428
Corps Rosenberg; General; Andrei Rosenberg (10,901)	General-major; Mikhail Miloradovich	5,339	(Russia) Mansurov Musketeer Regiment, 2 battalions	1,401
Corps Rosenberg; General; Andrei Rosenberg (10,901)	General-major; Mikhail Miloradovich	5,339	(Russia) Fertsch Musketeer Regiment, 2 battalions	1,467
Corps Rosenberg; General; Andrei Rosenberg (10,901)	Lieutenant General; Ivan Ivanovich Förster; Detached to Derfelden's Corps 24–26 September	2,982	(Russia) Förster Musketeer Regiment, 2 battalions	1,134
Corps Rosenberg; General; Andrei Rosenberg (10,901)	Lieutenant General; Ivan Ivanovich Förster; Detached to Derfelden's Corps 24–26 September	2,982	(Russia) Tyrtov Musketeer Regiment, 2 battalions	891
Corps Rosenberg; General; Andrei Rosenberg (10,901)	Lieutenant General; Ivan Ivanovich Förster; Detached to Derfelden's Corps 24–26 September	2,982	(Russia) Veletsky Musketeer Regiment, 2 battalions	957
Corps Rosenberg; General; Andrei Rosenberg (10,901)	Cossacks	1,883	(Russia) Grekov Cossack Regiment	472
Corps Rosenberg; General; Andrei Rosenberg (10,901)	Cossacks	1,883	(Russia) Denisov Cossack Regiment	449
Corps Rosenberg; General; Andrei Rosenberg (10,901)	Cossacks	1,883	(Russia) 2nd Posdeev Cossack Regiment	482
Corps Rosenberg; General; Andrei Rosenberg (10,901)	Cossacks	1,883	(Russia) Kurnakov Cossack Regiment	480
Attached	Artillery and Engineers	1,793	(Russia) Artillery: 25 2-pound cannons	1,581
Attached	Artillery and Engineers	1,793	(Russia) Engineers	212
Austrians	General-major; Franz Xaver von Auffenberg	2,000; 3,180	(Holy Roman Empire) Kerpen Infantry Regiment Nr. 49, 3 battalions	?
Austrians	General-major; Franz Xaver von Auffenberg	2,000; 3,180	(Holy Roman Empire) Gradiscaner Grenz Infantry Regiment Nr. 8, 3rd Battalion	?
Austrians	Colonel; Gottfried von Strauch	4,500; 6,000	(Holy Roman Empire) Wallis Infantry Regiment Nr. 11, 2 battalions	?
Austrians	Colonel; Gottfried von Strauch	4,500; 6,000	(Holy Roman Empire) Neugebauer Infantry Regiment Nr. 46, 1 battalion	?
Austrians	Colonel; Gottfried von Strauch	4,500; 6,000	(Holy Roman Empire) Waradiner-St. Georger Grenz Infantry Regiment Nr. 6, 2nd Battalion	?
Austrians	Colonel; Gottfried von Strauch	4,500; 6,000	(Holy Roman Empire) Deutsch-Banater Grenz Infantry Regiment Nr. 12, 1st Battalion	?
Austrians	Colonel; Gottfried von Strauch	4,500; 6,000	(Holy Roman Empire) Trautenberg Light Battalion Nr. 6	?
Austrians	Colonel; Gottfried von Strauch	4,500; 6,000	(Holy Roman Empire) Munkásy Light Battalion Nr. 13	?
Austrians	Colonel; Gottfried von Strauch	4,500; 6,000	(Holy Roman Empire) Rohan Light Battalion Nr. 14	?
Austrians	Colonel; Gottfried von Strauch	4,500; 6,000	(Holy Roman Empire) Le Loup Jäger Battalion	?

=== French order of battle ===
Claude Lecourbe's Division at Gotthard Pass
Divisions	Brigades	Units	Strength	Location
Division Lecourbe; General of Division; Claude Lecourbe	General of Brigade; Charles-Étienne Gudin	(France) 67th Line Infantry Demi-Brigade, 2 battalions	1,861	Gotthard Pass
Division Lecourbe; General of Division; Claude Lecourbe	General of Brigade; Charles-Étienne Gudin	(France) 109th Line Infantry Demi-brigade, 2 battalions	1,700	Oberalp Pass
Division Lecourbe; General of Division; Claude Lecourbe	General of Brigade; Charles-Étienne Gudin	(France) 3 grenadier companies (38th, 76th, 84th Line)	240	Andermatt
Division Lecourbe; General of Division; Claude Lecourbe	General of Brigade; Louis Henri Loison	(France) 38th Line Infantry Demi-brigade, 3 battalions	2,180	Amsteg
Division Lecourbe; General of Division; Claude Lecourbe	General of Brigade; Louis Henri Loison	(France) 76th Line Infantry Demi-brigade, 2 battalions	800	Amsteg
Division Lecourbe; General of Division; Claude Lecourbe	Divisional Reserve	(France) 9 grenadier companies	720	Altdorf
Division Lecourbe; General of Division; Claude Lecourbe	Divisional Reserve	(France) 1st Dragoon Regiment, 1 squadron	?	Schwyz
Division Lecourbe; General of Division; Claude Lecourbe	General of Brigade; Gabriel Jean Joseph Molitor	(France) 84th Line Infantry Demi-brigade, 3 battalions	2,599	Glarus; Detached - Not engaged

== See also ==
- Battle of Cassano
- First Battle of Marengo
- Battle of the Trebbia
- Battle of Novi
- Battle of Devil's Bridge
- Battle of the Klöntal
- Battle of the Muotatal
- Battle of Näfels

== Sources ==
- Duffy, Christopher (1999). Eagles Over the Alps: Suvarov in Italy and Switzerland, 1799. Chicago, Ill.: The Emperor's Press. ISBN 1-883476-18-6.
- Phipps, Ramsay Weston (2011) [1939]. The Armies of the First French Republic and the Rise of the Marshals of Napoleon I: The Armies of the Rhine in Switzerland, Holland, Italy, Egypt, and the Coup d'Etat of Brumaire (1797-1799). Vol. 5. Pickle Partners Publishing. ISBN 978-1-908692-28-3.
- Smith, Digby (1998). The Napoleonic Wars Data Book. London: Greenhill. ISBN 1-85367-276-9.
- Clodfelter, M. (2017). Warfare and Armed Conflicts: A Statistical Encyclopedia of Casualty and Other Figures, 1492-2015 (4th ed.). Jefferson, North Carolina: McFarland. ISBN 978-0-7864-7470-7.
- Bodart, Gaston (1908). Militär-historisches Kriegs-Lexikon (1618–1905).

Preceded by Battle of Novi	French Revolution: Revolutionary campaigns Battle of Gotthard Pass	Succeeded by Second Battle of Zurich
