= Schöllenen Gorge =

Gorge in Switzerland

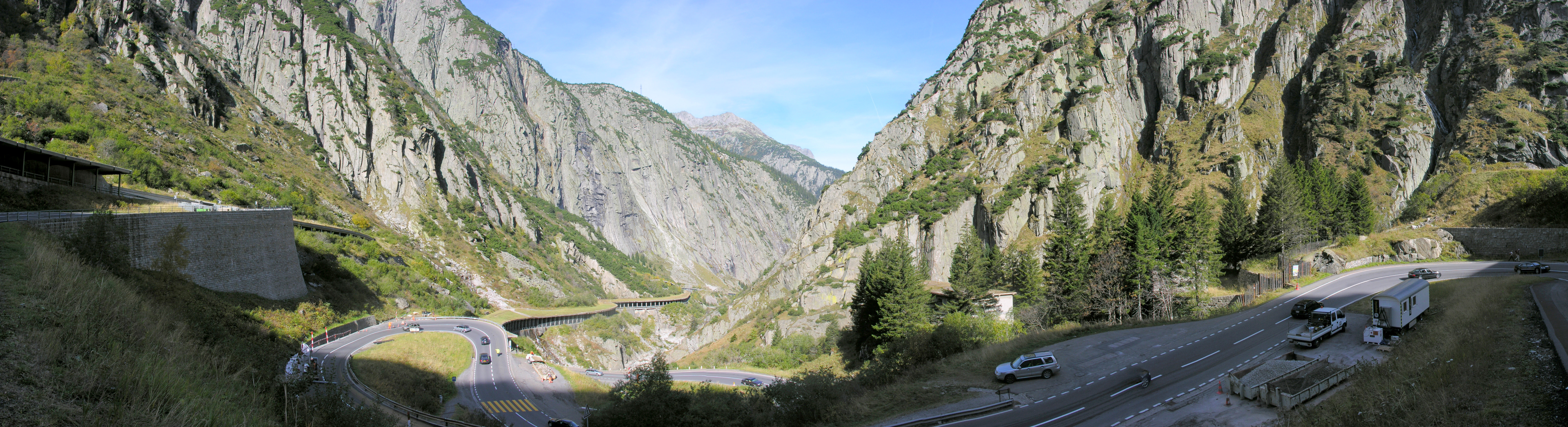
Panoramic view of the Schöllenen looking to the north (2007)

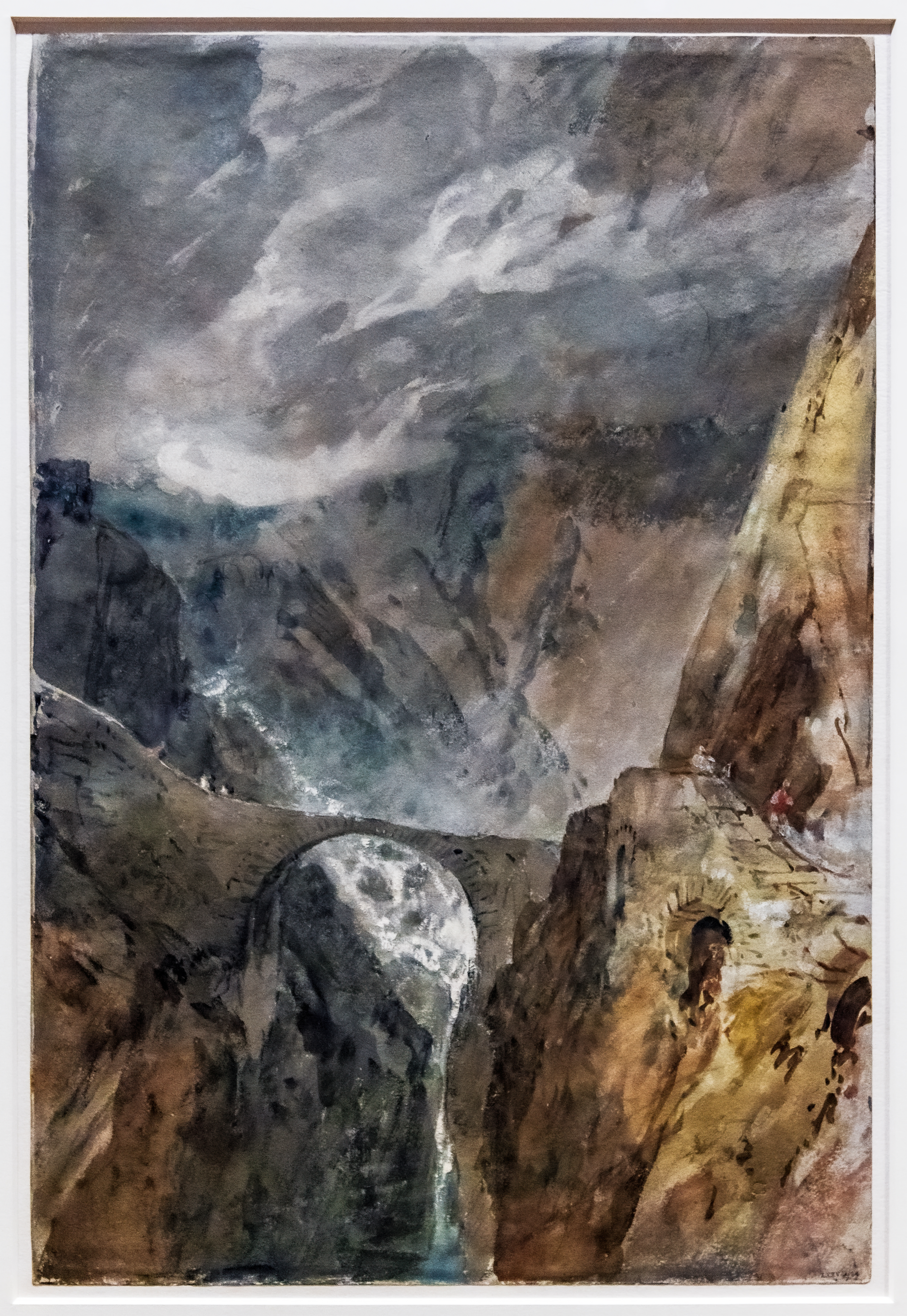
Painting of an old bridge (built 1595, collapsed 1888), 1802 J. M. W. Turner

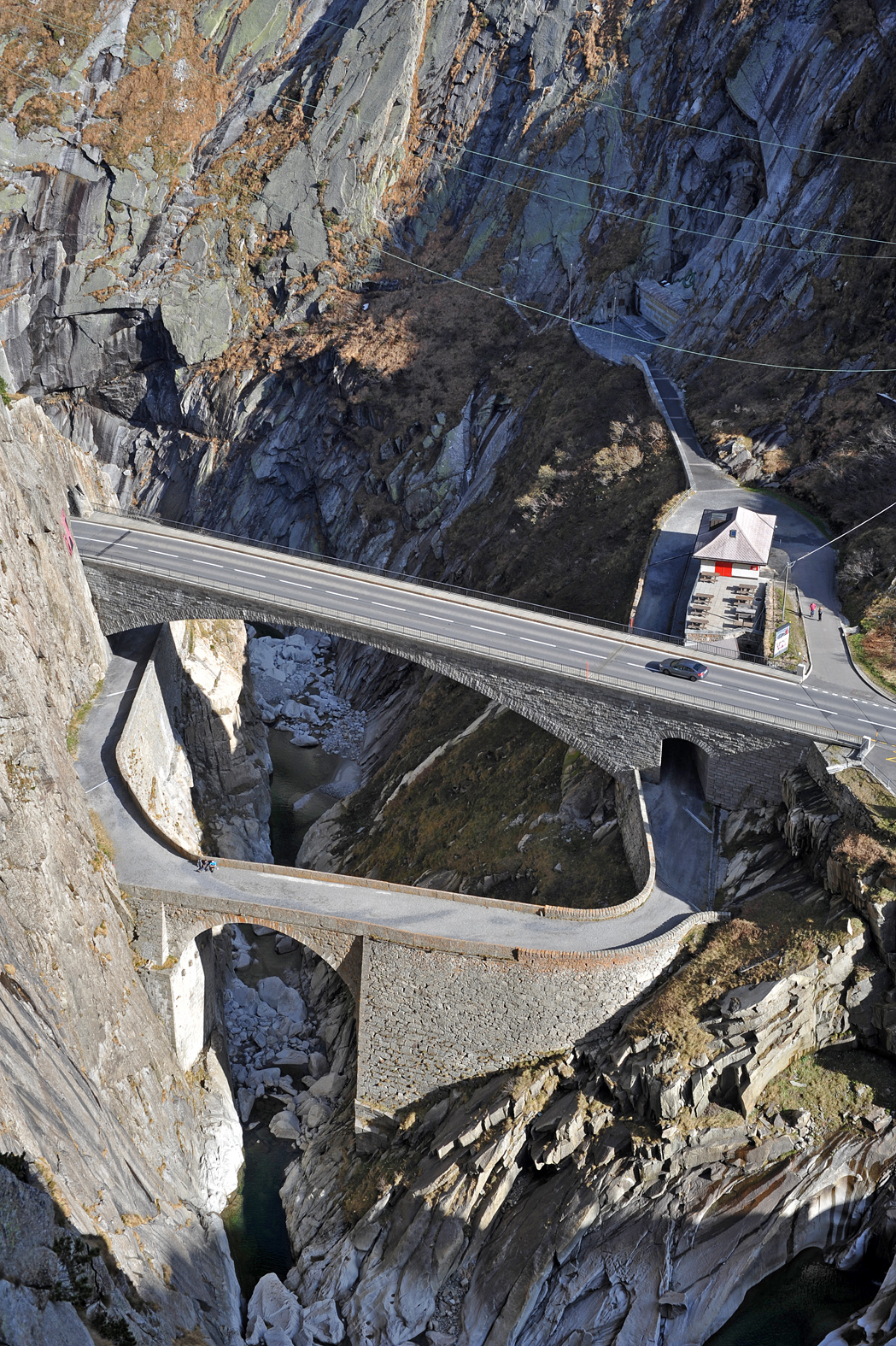
Current situation (October 2011) with the second most recent (1830) and most recent (1958) bridge.

Schöllenen Gorge (German: Schöllenen) is a gorge formed by the upper Reuss in the Swiss canton of Uri between the villages of Andermatt to the south and Göschenen to the north. It provides access to the Alpine valley Urseren and consequently to the St Gotthard Pass to the south, the Furka Pass to the west, and the Oberalp Pass to the east.

Enclosed by sheer granite walls, its road and railway require several bridges and tunnels, of which the most famous is a stone bridge known as the Teufelsbrücke ("Devil's Bridge").

== Geology ==
The lower Urseren marks the boundary of the Aar massif with the autochthonous sediment of the Gotthard nappe ("Urseren-Zone"). In Altkirch quarry, on the southern end of the gorge, Triassic and Jurassic sediments are exposed. In the Schöllenen Gorge (at the Urnerloch tunnel), the Reuss enters the crystalline Aar massif (Aar granite), the gorge itself being an exemplary late alpine fluvial water gap.

== History ==
=== Early history ===
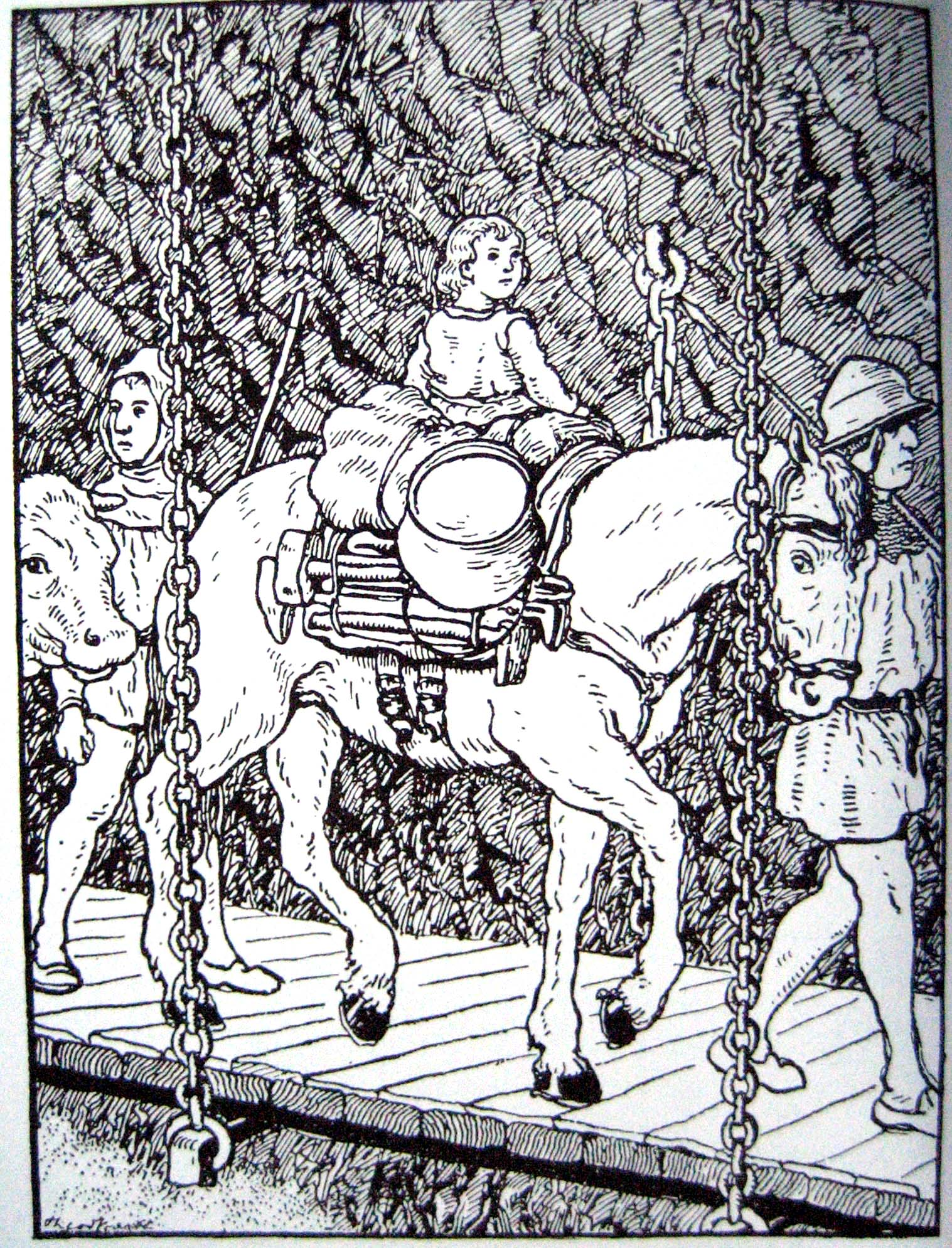
Modern illustration of the Twärrenbrücke (Theodor Barth, 1919), reflecting the unhistorical (but widely repeated) tradition describing it as supported by chains

The name of the gorge is from Rumantsch *scalinae 'stairs, steps', recorded in German as Schellenden in 1420. It formed the upper limit of Alemannic settlement in the Alps prior to the 12th century, and the border between the bishoprics of Constance and Raetia Curensis.

The gorge appears to have been passable by a difficult footpath by the mid-12th century. This path was forced to avoid the southern part of the gorge, taking a steep ascent from Brüggliwaldboden, climbing above 1,800 m before descending to Hospental via Bäzberg. The eponymous scalinae presumably referred to steps hewn into the rock to facilitate the ascent.

The gorge was first opened up as a bridle path with the construction of a wooden bridge in c. 1230 (before 1234). This was of great strategic importance because it opened the Gotthard Pass, with historical consequences both regionally and to the Italian politics of the Holy Roman Empire.

The original bridle path across Schöllenen was realised by means of a wooden ledge attached to the rock wall, known as Twärrenbrücke, and a wooden bridge across the gorge, recorded as stiebende Brugge 'spray bridge' in 1306. The Twärrenbrücke (from twer 'across, athwart') rested on beams laid across the gorge. A tradition imagining it as supported by hanging chains developed only after its collapse in the 18th century. The technology associated with the construction of the Twärrenbrücke is attributed to the Walser, who are known to have begun settlement in Urseren still in the 12th century. 16th-century historiography attributes the construction of the bridge to one Heini (Heinrich), blacksmith in Göschenen. Robert Schedler published a historical novel surrounding the construction of the Schöllenen bridle path, Der Schmied von Göschenen, in 1919.

=== Devil's Bridge legend ===
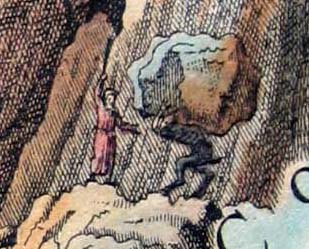
Detail from Johann Jakob Scheuchzer's Nova Helvetiae Tabula Geographica of 1712, showing the holy man preventing the Devil from hurling the rock (illustration by Johann Melchior Füssli).

In Early Modern Switzerland, a legend developed which attributed the construction of the bridge to the Devil. This is a motif attached to numerous old bridges in Europe (see Devil's Bridge for a comparative account). The name Teiffels Brucken ("Devil's Bridge", modern German: Teufelsbrücke) is first recorded in 1587.

The legend is related by Johann Jakob Scheuchzer (1716). According to Scheuchzer, he was told a local legend according to which the people of Uri recruited the Devil for the difficult task of building the bridge. The Devil requested to receive the first thing to pass the bridge in exchange for his help. To trick the Devil, who expected to receive the soul of the first man to pass the bridge, the people of Uri sent across a dog by throwing a piece of bread, and the dog was promptly torn to pieces by the Devil. Enraged at having been tricked the Devil went to fetch a large rock to smash the bridge, but, carrying the rock back to the bridge, he came across a holy man who "scolded him" (der ihn bescholten) and forced him to drop the rock, which could still be seen on the path below Göschenen. A modern retelling was published by Meinrad Lienert, Schweizer Sagen und Heldengeschichten (1915). According to Lienert's version, a goat was sent across the bridge instead of a dog, and instead of the holy man, the Devil, when he was taking a break exhausted from carrying the rock, came across an old woman who marked the rock with a cross, forcing the Devil to abandon it and flee.

The legend does not appear to have existed before the 16th century, and its origin in local tradition is uncertain. Lauf-Belart (1924) surmised that the name Teufelsbrücke was originally due to an erroneous interpretation by learned travellers, which only in the 17th century gave rise to the local legend involving the Devil.

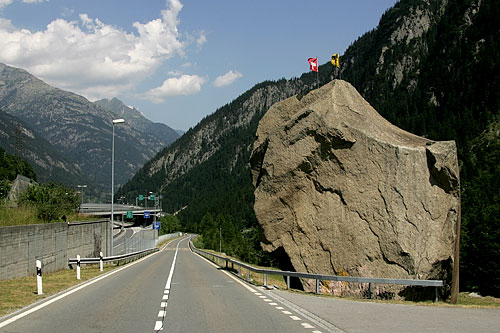
Contemporary situation of the Teufelsstein (Devil's Stone) (46.6715°N 8.5930°E; 2006 photograph)

The Devil's Stone (Teufelsstein) is a large block of granite near Göschenen, with a height of c. 12 m and a mass of c. 2200 tons. In 1887, it was sold to the Maestrani Schweizer Schokoladenfabrik for 80 francs. Painted yellow, it now served as an advertisement for chocolate. In 1923, there were plans to demolish it, but it was preserved on the initiative of Max Oechslin, president of Naturforschende Gesellschaft Uri. In 1970, the Devil's Stone was again scheduled for destruction, to make way for the N2 motorway. This time, there was a broad movement to preserve it, and in 1971, federal authorities agreed to move the stone, with projected costs of 250,000 francs (of which the canton of Uri was to contribute 7,000). This led to a popular campaign opposing the plan because the cost was seen as excessive. The liberal newspaper Gotthard-Post proposed to spend the money on the construction of a retirement home instead, collecting 1,000 signatures in support. The cantonal government now argued that there was no legal basis for the destruction of the stone because it had been the property of Naturforschende Gesellschaft Uri since 1925. On 1 September 1972, the Federal Council finally agreed to moving the stone, and it was moved 127 metres in an operation costing CHF 335,000. It is now situated on the ramp of exit 40 (Göschenen) of the motorway, at the entrance of Gotthard Road Tunnel, visible both from the railway and from the motorway.

=== Early modern history ===
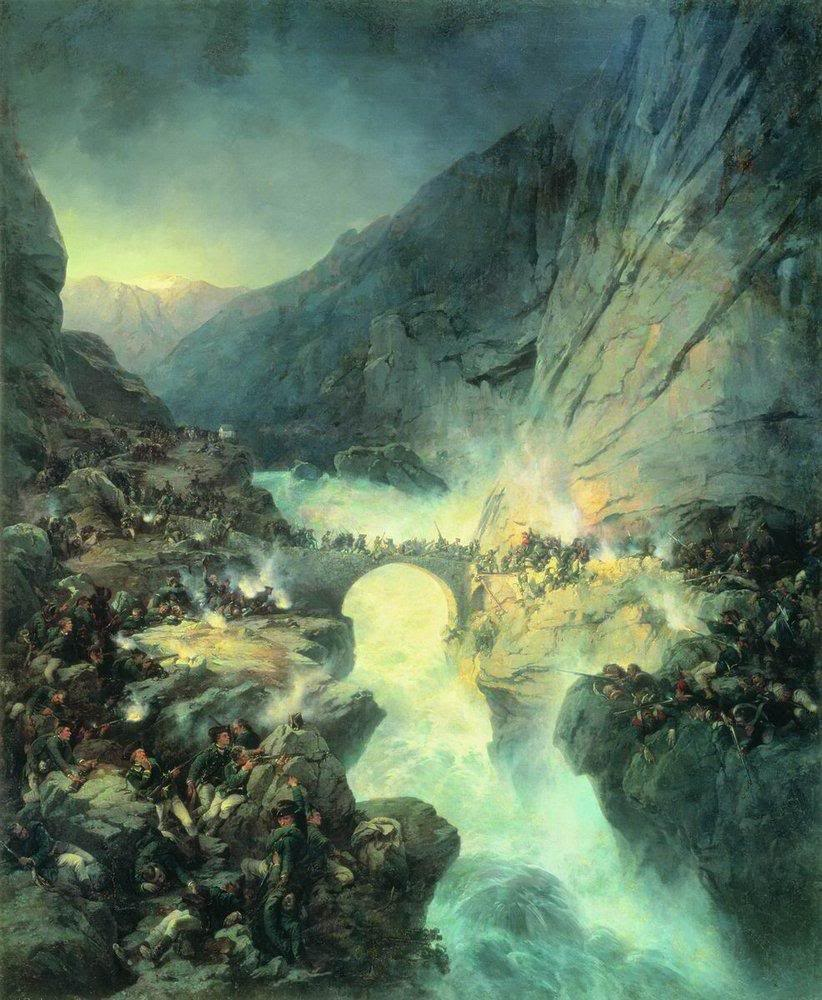
Russian Marshal Alexander Suvorov crossing over the Devil's Bridge on 25 September 1799 (Alexander von Kotzebue, 1857)

View of the Urnerloch tunnel (Salomon Gessner, 1781)

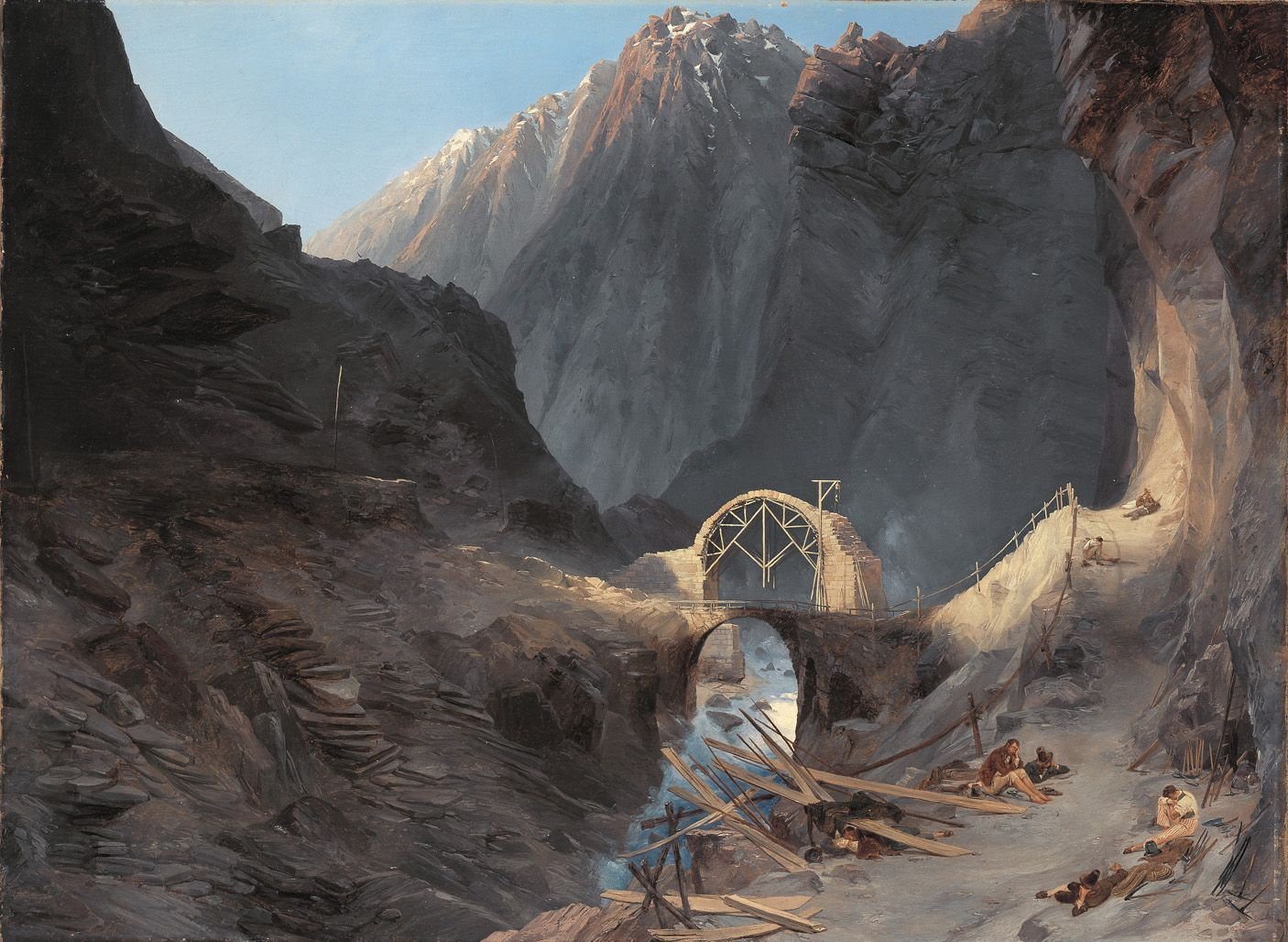
Construction of the second bridge, Karl Blechen (c. 1833)

In 1595, the wooden Stiebender Steg bridge was replaced by a stone bridge which came to be known as Devil's Bridge (German: Teufelsbrücke).

On St Patrick's Day (17 March) 1608, Hugh O'Neill, Earl of Tyrone, was fleeing from Ulster to Rome with 98 of his fellow-Gaels. As they crossed the Devil's Bridge, one of the horses carrying his fortune plunged into the torrent below; the horse was recovered, but not the gold, which was lost in the raging torrent.

A new road, including a tunnel with a length c. 60 m (200 ft), replacing the Twärrenbrücke was built in 1707/08. The tunnel, constructed by Pietro Morettini (1660–1737) and known as the Urnerloch ("Uri Hole"), was the first road-tunnel to be built in the Alps. Following its construction, the Twärrenbrücke was no longer maintained and was allowed to collapse.

Hans Rudolf Schinz in 1783 mentions another bridge, marking the border between Uri and Urseren, known as Mittelbrücke or Tanzenbein.

In September 1799, the Teufelsbrücke became one of the sites of the battles at the Saint-Gotthard, and one of the most dramatic battles of Suvorov's Italian and Swiss expedition during the French Revolutionary and Napoleonic Wars. The bridge was heavily damaged by the retreating French army. As a result, the route's trade with Italy shifted to the Splügenpass. In the 1890s, the Russian Empire commissioned the Suvorov monument, just south of the Devil's Bridge.

=== Modern engineering ===
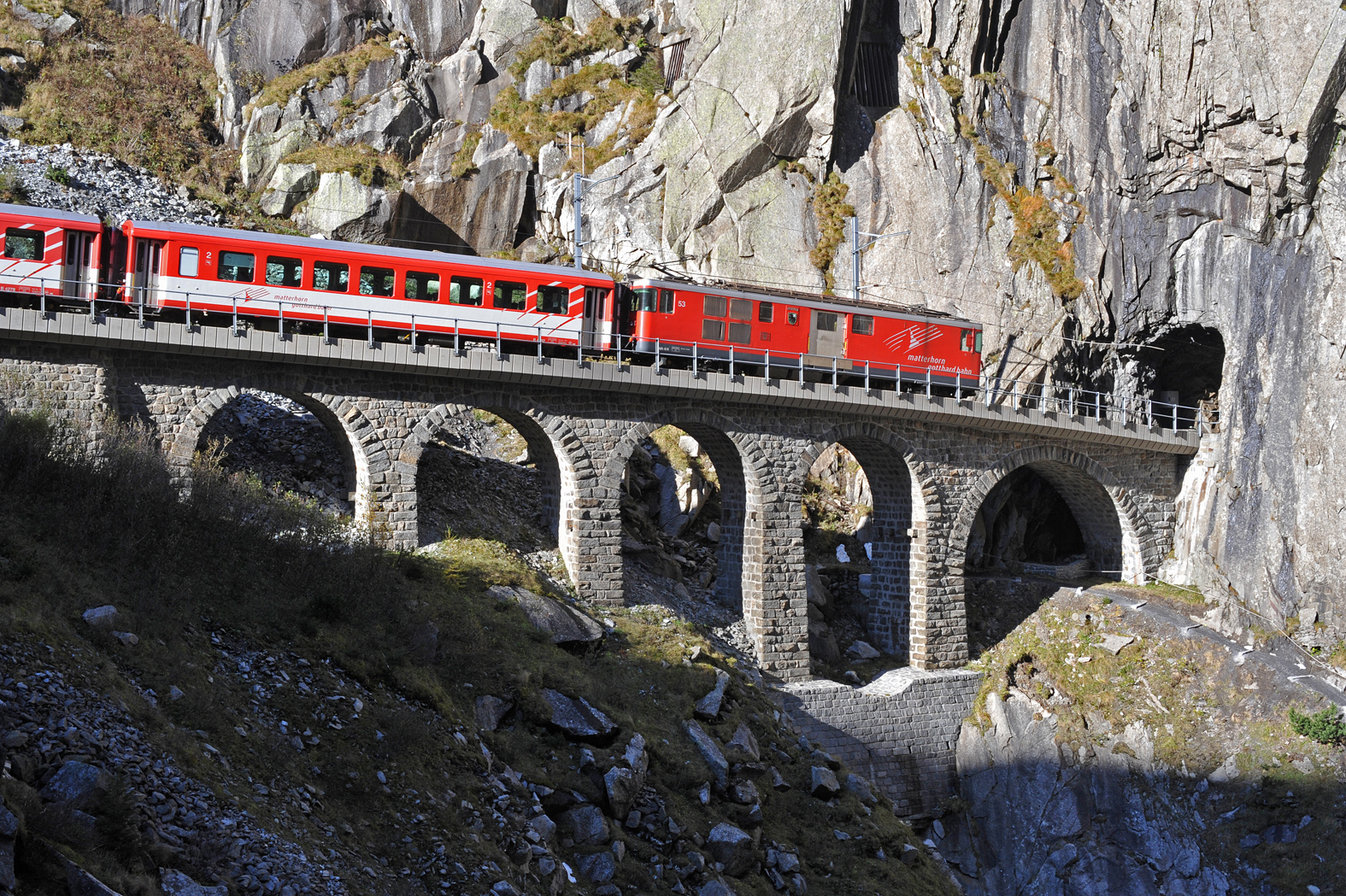
Schöllenenbahn railway bridge and tunnel

A replacement cut stone bridge was planned and executed by Karl Emanuel Müller (1804–1869), the cantonal engineer in charge of the stretch of the new Gotthard road between Göschenen and Hospental. Construction took 10 years, and was the subject of a famous painting by Karl Blechen in 1830–1832. The new bridge allowed (single-lane) motorized traffic, potentially opening the Gotthard Pass to automobiles. The 1595 bridge fell out of use after the completion of the second bridge in 1830, and it collapsed in 1888.

The Gotthard railway project of 1872 avoided the Schöllenen Gorge by building the Gotthard Rail Tunnel under it, but the Schöllenenbahn, a rack railway, was built through the gorge in 1917. The modern road bridge and tunnel date to 1958. It served as the main road across the Central Alps during the 1960s and 1970s, but since the construction of the Gotthard Road Tunnel in 1980, it has only been of regional importance, connecting Uri with canton of Valais and the Surselva.
