= List of mountains of Switzerland above 3000 m =

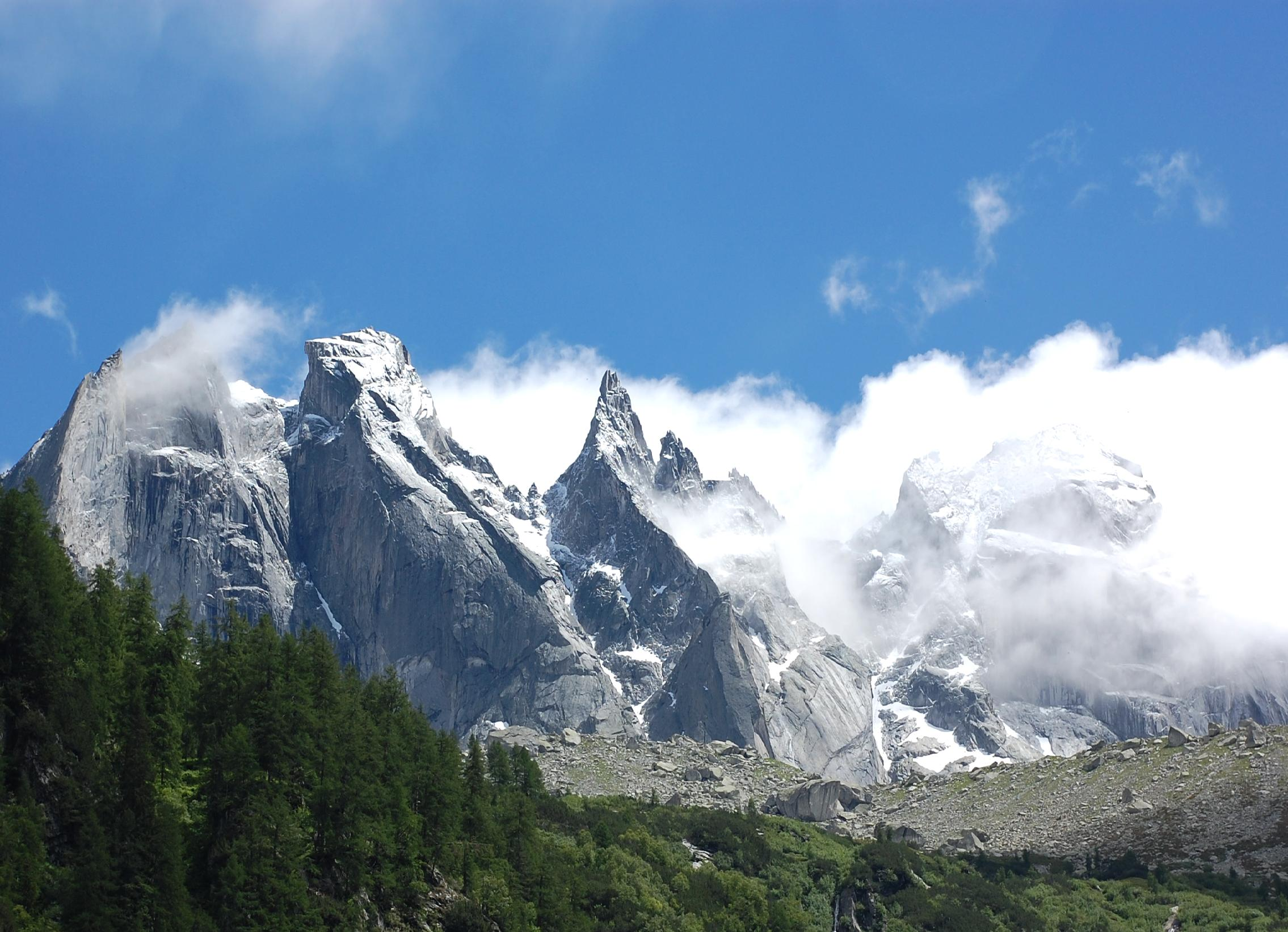
The Sciora group (Bregaglia Alps)

This is a list of mountains of Switzerland above 3,000 metres (9,843 ft). This height, in the Alps, approximately corresponds to the level of the climatic snow line. Note that this list includes many secondary summits that are not always considered independent mountains (in the strict sense of the term) but that are mainly of climbing interest. For a list of major summits only, without elevation cut-off, see List of mountains of Switzerland.

This list only includes significant summits with a topographic prominence of at least 150 metres (492 ft). There are 437 such summits exceeding 3,000 m in Switzerland. They are found in the cantons of Valais, Bern, Graubünden, Uri, Glarus, Ticino, St. Gallen, Obwalden and Vaud. All mountain heights and prominences on the list are from the largest-scale maps available.

Distribution of the mountains with at least 150 metres of prominence
Canton	3000- 3249m	3250- 3499m	3500- 3749m	3750- 3999m	4000- 4249m	4250- 4499m	4500m+	Total (3000m+)
Bern	18	13	11	7	4	1	0	54
Glarus	6	2	1	0	0	0	0	9
Graubünden	165	37	4	4	1	0	0	211
Obwalden	2	0	0	0	0	0	0	2
St. Gallen	2	0	0	0	0	0	0	2
Ticino	16	2	0	0	0	0	0	18
Uri	22	7	3	0	0	0	0	32
Valais	56	27	37	30	17	6	4	177
Vaud	3	0	0	0	0	0	0	3
Switzerland	246	79	48	35	19	6	4	437

== List ==
Rank	Mountain	Height (m)	Drop (m)	Coordinates	Range	Canton(s)	First ascent
1	Monte Rosa (Dufourspitze)	4634	2165	45°56′13″N 07°52′01″E	Pennine Alps	Valais	1855
2	Dom	4546	1047	46°05′38″N 07°51′32″E	Pennine Alps	Valais	1858
3	Lyskamm	4532	379	45°55′20″N 07°50′08″E	Pennine Alps	Valais	1861
4	Weisshorn	4505	1234	46°06′05″N 07°42′57″E	Pennine Alps	Valais	1861
5	Täschhorn	4491	213	46°05′01″N 07°51′26″E	Pennine Alps	Valais	1862
6	Matterhorn	4478	1043	45°58′35″N 07°39′31″E	Pennine Alps	Valais	1865
7	Dent Blanche	4357	916	46°02′03″N 07°36′43″E	Pennine Alps	Valais	1862
8	Nadelhorn	4327	207	46°06′32″N 07°51′51″E	Pennine Alps	Valais	1858
9	Grand Combin (de Grafeneire)	4309	1512	45°56′15″N 07°17′57″E	Pennine Alps	Valais	1859
10	Finsteraarhorn	4274	2279	46°32′14″N 08°07′34″E	Bernese Alps	Bern/Valais	1829
11	Castor	4225	156	45°55′20″N 07°47′34″E	Pennine Alps	Valais	1861
12	Zinalrothorn	4221	491	46°03′54″N 07°41′25″E	Pennine Alps	Valais	1864
13	Alphubel	4206	359	46°03′47″N 07°51′50″E	Pennine Alps	Valais	1860
14	Rimpfischhorn	4199	647	46°01′24″N 07°53′03″E	Pennine Alps	Valais	1859
15	Aletschhorn	4194	1043	46°27′54″N 07°59′38″E	Bernese Alps	Valais	1859
16	Strahlhorn	4190	404	46°00′48″N 07°54′06″E	Pennine Alps	Valais	1854
17	Dent d'Hérens	4173	704	45°58′12″N 07°36′19″E	Pennine Alps	Valais	1863
18	Breithorn (western summit)	4160	438	45°56′28″N 07°44′56″E	Pennine Alps	Valais	1813
19	Jungfrau	4158	694	46°32′12″N 07°57′45″E	Bernese Alps	Bern/Valais	1811
20	Mönch	4110	591	46°33′30″N 07°59′50″E	Bernese Alps	Bern/Valais	1857
21	Pollux	4089	243	45°55′40″N 07°47′07″E	Pennine Alps	Valais	1864
22	Schreckhorn	4078	795	46°35′24″N 08°07′05″E	Bernese Alps	Bern	1861
23	Ober Gabelhorn	4063	536	46°02′19″N 07°40′05″E	Pennine Alps	Valais	1865
24	Gross Fiescherhorn	4049	396	46°33′05″N 08°03′41″E	Bernese Alps	Bern/Valais	1862
25	Piz Bernina	4048	2236	46°22′56″N 09°54′29″E	Bernina Range	Graubünden	1850
26	Gross Grünhorn	4043	303	46°31′55″N 08°04′40″E	Bernese Alps	Valais	1865
27	Allalinhorn	4027	257	46°02′46″N 07°53′41″E	Pennine Alps	Valais	1856
28	Weissmies	4013	1183	46°07′40″N 08°00′44″E	Pennine Alps	Valais	1855
29	Lagginhorn	4010	512	46°09′26″N 08°00′11″E	Pennine Alps	Valais	1856
30	Piz Zupò	3995	414	46°22′06″N 09°55′53″E	Bernina Range	Graubünden	1863
31	Fletschhorn	3985	300	46°10′04″N 08°00′11″E	Pennine Alps	Valais	1854
32	Gletscherhorn	3982	355	46°30′46″N 07°58′04″E	Bernese Alps	Bern/Valais	1867
33	Schalihorn	3975	225	46°05′04″N 07°42′18″E	Pennine Alps	Valais	
34	Eiger	3967	361	46°34′39″N 08°00′19″E	Bernese Alps	Bern	1858
35	Grand Cornier	3962	431	46°03′07″N 07°36′41″E	Pennine Alps	Valais	1865
36	Ebnefluh	3961	201	46°30′29″N 07°57′11″E	Bernese Alps	Bern/Valais	
37	Agassizhorn	3947	200	46°32′48″N 08°06′52″E	Bernese Alps	Bern/Valais	
38	Piz Roseg	3935	417	46°22′25″N 09°52′59″E	Bernina Range	Graubünden	1865
39	Bietschhorn	3934	807	46°23′30″N 07°51′03″E	Bernese Alps	Valais	1859
40	Trugberg	3932	308	46°32′48″N 08°00′55″E	Bernese Alps	Valais	1871
41	Gross Wannenhorn	3906	636	46°29′38″N 08°05′49″E	Bernese Alps	Valais	1864
42	Piz Palü	3899	223	46°22′42″N 09°57′38″E	Bernina Range	Graubünden	1866
43	Aiguille d'Argentière	3898	470	45°57′36″N 07°01′12″E	Mont Blanc massif	Valais	1864
44	Mittaghorn	3893	197	46°29′54″N 07°55′47″E	Bernese Alps	Bern/Valais	
45	Fiescher Gabelhorn	3876	152	46°30′08″N 08°05′03″E	Bernese Alps	Valais	
46	Ruinette	3875	860	45°58′45″N 07°24′01″E	Pennine Alps	Valais	1865
	Crast' Agüzza	3870	179	46°22′50″N 09°54′25″E	Bernina Range	Grisons	1865
47	Mont Blanc de Cheilon	3870	174	45°59′35″N 07°25′02″E	Pennine Alps	Valais	1865
48	Bouquetins	3838	490	45°58′56″N 07°32′43″E	Pennine Alps	Valais	1871
49	Tour Noir	3837	302	45°56′56″N 07°02′15″E	Mont Blanc massif	Valais	1876
50	Brunegghorn	3831	304	46°07′33″N 07°44′45″E	Pennine Alps	Valais	
51	Nesthorn	3820	658	46°24′48″N 07°55′34″E	Bernese Alps	Valais	1865
52	Mont Dolent	3820	330	45°55′21″N 07°02′46″E	Mont Blanc massif	Valais	1864
53	Dreieckhorn	3811	192	46°28′41″N 08°01′12″E	Bernese Alps	Valais	
54	Tête de Valpelline	3799	239	45°58′31″N 07°34′52″E	Pennine Alps	Valais	
55	Schinhorn	3796	422	46°27′06″N 07°56′48″E	Bernese Alps	Valais	1869
56	Balfrin	3796	243	46°08′06″N 07°52′49″E	Pennine Alps	Valais	
57	Cima di Jazzi	3792	241	45°58′52″N 07°53′41″E	Pennine Alps	Valais	
58	Pointe de Zinal	3789	301	46°01′37″N 07°37′50″E	Pennine Alps	Valais	1870
59	La Serpentine	3789	247	45°59′04″N 07°26′00″E	Pennine Alps	Valais	
60	Pigne d'Arolla	3787	157	45°59′28″N 07°27′18″E	Pennine Alps	Valais	1865
61	Breithorn (Blatten)	3785	282	46°26′08″N 07°53′38″E	Bernese Alps	Valais	
62	Breithorn (Lauterbrunnen)	3780	464	46°28′43″N 07°52′36″E	Bernese Alps	Bern/Valais	1865
63	Grosshorn	3754	194	46°29′12″N 07°54′39″E	Bernese Alps	Bern/Valais	
64	Piz Morteratsch	3751	324	46°24′10″N 09°54′06″E	Bernina Range	Graubünden	1858
65	Geisshorn	3740	158	46°26′28″N 08°00′21″E	Bernese Alps	Valais	
66	Mont Vélan	3726	620	45°53′30″N 07°15′06″E	Pennine Alps	Valais	1779
67	Evêque	3716	647	45°57′52″N 07°30′10″E	Pennine Alps	Valais	1867
68	Combin de Corbassière	3716	312	45°58′41″N 07°16′50″E	Pennine Alps	Valais	1851
69	La Singla	3714	452	45°56′45″N 07°28′19″E	Pennine Alps	Valais	1867
70	Mont Durand	3713	169	46°02′02″N 07°39′02″E	Pennine Alps	Valais	
71	Tête Blanche	3710	153	45°59′15″N 07°34′30″E	Pennine Alps	Valais	
72	Le Pleureur	3704	467	46°00′59″N 07°22′09″E	Pennine Alps	Valais	1867
73	Wetterhörner (Mittelhorn)	3702	578	46°38′07″N 08°07′29″E	Bernese Alps	Bern	1845
74	Tournelon Blanc	3700	159	45°58′11″N 07°19′20″E	Pennine Alps	Valais	
75	Balmhorn	3697	1020	46°25′30″N 07°41′37″E	Bernese Alps	Bern/Valais	1864
76	Wetterhorn	3690	211	46°38′20″N 08°06′56″E	Bernese Alps	Bern	1844
77	Rosenhorn	3689	193	46°37′55″N 08°08′14″E	Bernese Alps	Bern	
78	Grande Aiguille	3682	223	45°57′01″N 07°15′53″E	Pennine Alps	Valais	
79	Pointe Kurz	3676	174	45°56′18″N 07°02′08″E	Mont Blanc massif	Valais	
80	Dent de Perroc	3676	408	46°02′22″N 07°31′23″E	Pennine Alps	Valais	1871
	Besso	3669	151	46°04′39″N 07°39′32″E	Pennine Alps	Valais	1862
81	Aiguille de la Tsa	3668	251	46°01′17″N 07°31′20″E	Pennine Alps	Valais	
82	Combin de Boveire	3663	173	45°57′53″N 07°16′15″E	Pennine Alps	Valais	
83	Blüemlisalp(horn)	3660	896	46°29′20″N 07°46′21″E	Bernese Alps	Bern	1860
84	Bärglistock	3655	223	46°36′56″N 08°08′27″E	Bernese Alps	Bern	
85	Portjengrat (Pizzo d'Andolla)	3654	411	46°06′03″N 08°02′05″E	Pennine Alps	Valais	1871
86	Aiguilles Rouges d'Arolla	3644	789	46°03′19″N 07°26′01″E	Pennine Alps	Valais	1870
87	Doldenhorn	3638	655	46°28′08″N 07°44′05″E	Bernese Alps	Bern	1862
88	Mont Collon	3637	208	45°58′35″N 07°30′17″E	Pennine Alps	Valais	1867
89	Studerhorn	3632	230	46°31′58″N 08°08′52″E	Bernese Alps	Bern/Valais	
90	Oberaarhorn	3631	260	46°31′53″N 08°10′28″E	Bernese Alps	Bern/Valais	
91	Dammastock	3630	1466	46°38′36″N 08°25′16″E	Uri Alps	Uri/Valais	1864
92	Tödi (Piz Russein)	3614	1570	46°48′40″N 08°54′53″E	Glarus Alps	Glarus/Graubünden	1824
93	Grande Fourche	3610	275	45°58′35″N 07°01′16″E	Mont Blanc massif	Valais	
94	Barrhorn	3610	267	46°09′21″N 07°44′03″E	Pennine Alps	Valais	
95	Les Diablons	3609	379	46°08′33″N 07°40′16″E	Pennine Alps	Valais	1863
96	Piz Cambrena	3606	158	46°23′16″N 09°58′52″E	Bernina Range	Graubünden	
97	Piz Glüschaint	3594	341	46°21′45″N 09°50′24″E	Bernina Range	Graubünden	1863
98	Galenstock	3586	252	46°36′43″N 08°25′01″E	Uri Alps	Uri/Valais	1845
99	Mont Brulé	3578	365	45°57′18″N 07°32′18″E	Pennine Alps	Valais	1876
100	Petit Mont Collon	3556	264	45°58′04″N 07°28′52″E	Pennine Alps	Valais	
101	Tschingelhorn	3555	389	46°28′43″N 07°50′55″E	Bernese Alps	Bern/Valais	1865
102	Aouille Tseuque	3554	345	45°55′49″N 07°26′35″E	Pennine Alps	Valais	
103	Monte Leone	3553	1144	46°14′58″N 08°06′36″E	Lepontine Alps	Valais	1859
104	La Luette	3548	179	46°00′37″N 07°23′15″E	Pennine Alps	Valais	
105	Piz Tschierva	3545	211	46°24′51″N 09°53′10″E	Bernina Range	Graubünden	1850
106	Aiguille du Tour	3540	259	45°59′40″N 07°00′35″E	Mont Blanc massif	Valais	1875
107	Bec d'Epicoune	3531	298	45°54′53″N 07°25′21″E	Pennine Alps	Valais	1866
108	Finsteraarrothorn	3530	195	46°31′04″N 08°08′52″E	Bernese Alps	Valais	
109	Aiguilles Dorées	3519	258	45°58′57″N 07°02′00″E	Mont Blanc massif	Valais	
110	Mont Gelé	3518	619	45°54′15″N 07°21′58″E	Pennine Alps	Valais	1861
111	Galmihorn	3507	302	46°30′24″N 08°11′05″E	Bernese Alps	Valais	
112	Sustenhorn	3503	414	46°41′56″N 08°27′19″E	Uri Alps	Bern/Uri	1841
113	Pointe de Bertol	3499	190	46°00′35″N 07°31′42″E	Pennine Alps	Valais	
114	Furgggrat	3492	197	45°57′25″N 07°40′53″E	Pennine Alps	Valais	
115	Pointe de Vouasson	3490	154	46°04′20″N 07°25′31″E	Pennine Alps	Valais	
116	Sonnighorn/Pizzo Bottarello	3487	340	46°04′27″N 08°01′20″E	Pennine Alps	Valais	1879
117	Nasse Strahlegg	3485	170	46°33′12″N 08°07′58″E	Bernese Alps	Bern	
118	Oberaarrothorn	3477	184	46°31′13″N 08°10′51″E	Bernese Alps	Bern/Valais	
119	Piz Varuna	3453	222	46°21′08″N 09°59′35″E	Bernina Range	Graubünden	
120	Piz Corvatsch	3451	383	46°24′30″N 09°48′58″E	Bernina Range	Graubünden	1850
121	Rinderhorn	3449	414	46°24′49″N 07°39′15″E	Bernese Alps	Valais	1854
122	Hinter Tierberg	3477	187	46°41′03″N 08°23′51″E	Uri Alps	Bern/Uri	
123	Wasenhorn	3447	303	46°29′53″N 08°09′57″E	Bernese Alps	Valais	1885
124	Piz Tremoggia	3441	349	46°21′07″N 09°49′19″E	Bernina Range	Graubünden	1859
125	Gspaltenhorn	3436	600	46°30′42″N 07°49′39″E	Bernese Alps	Bern	1869
126	Stellihorn	3436	598	46°02′11″N 08°00′03″E	Pennine Alps	Valais	
127	Gwächtenhorn	3420	218	46°41′27″N 08°24′48″E	Uri Alps	Bern/Uri	
128	Bifertenstock/Piz Durschin	3419	383	46°48′16″N 08°57′27″E	Glarus Alps	Glarus/Graubünden	1863
129	Piz Kesch/Piz d'Es-Cha	3418	1503	46°37′17″N 09°52′22″E	Albula Alps	Graubünden	1846
130	Fleckistock/Rot Stock	3416	760	46°42′27″N 08°29′51″E	Uri Alps	Uri	1864
131	Oberrothorn	3414	259	46°01′39″N 07°48′46″E	Pennine Alps	Valais	
132	Piz Linard	3411	1028	46°47′56″N 10°04′18″E	Silvretta Alps	Graubünden	1835
133	(Inners) Stellihorn	3410	175	46°10′01″N 07°44′22″E	Pennine Alps	Valais	1890
134	Mettelhorn	3406	240	46°03′26″N 07°44′33″E	Pennine Alps	Valais	
135	Pointe d'Otemma	3403	224	45°56′37″N 07°23′53″E	Pennine Alps	Valais	
136	Rheinwaldhorn	3402	1337	46°29′37″N 09°02′25″E	Lepontine Alps	Graubünden/Ticino	1789
137	Fluchthorn	3399	647	46°53′27″N 10°13′39″E	Silvretta Alps	Graubünden	1861
138	Piz Calderas	3397	1085	46°32′11″N 09°41′45″E	Albula Alps	Graubünden	1857
139	Piz Platta	3392	1108	46°29′14″N 09°33′42″E	Oberhalbstein Alps	Graubünden	1866
140	Diechterhorn	3389	308	46°38′55″N 08°21′38″E	Uri Alps	Bern	1864
141	Tieralplistock (Note: High point north of the Tieralplistock)	3388	173	46°37′59″N 08°22′31″E	Uri Alps	Bern	
142	Il Chapütschin	3386	165	46°22′29″N 09°49′09″E	Bernina Range	Graubünden	
143	Piz Julier/Piz Güglia	3380	489	46°29′28″N 09°45′35″E	Albula Alps	Graubünden	1859
144	Güferhorn	3379	400	46°30′45″N 09°03′47″E	Lepontine Alps	Graubünden	1806
145	Cima di Castello	3379	388	46°18′11″N 09°40′37″E	Bregaglia Range	Graubünden	1866
146	Piz d'Err	3378	153	46°32′43″N 09°41′30″E	Albula Alps	Graubünden	
147	Blinnenhorn/Corno Cieco	3374	945	46°25′33″N 08°18′28″E	Lepontine Alps	Valais	1866
148	Pizzo Cengalo	3369	620	46°17′42″N 09°36′07″E	Bregaglia Range	Graubünden	1866
149	Fründenhorn	3368	198	46°28′37″N 07°45′27″E	Bernese Alps	Bern	
150	Egginer	3367	378	46°04′31″N 07°55′48″E	Pennine Alps	Valais	
151	Cima di Rosso	3366	266	46°18′23″N 09°43′06″E	Bernina Range	Graubünden	
152	Piz Fora	3363	432	46°20′27″N 09°47′05″E	Bernina Range	Graubünden	1875
153	Mont Avril	3347	158	45°54′55″N 07°20′40″E	Pennine Alps	Valais	
154	Le Portalet	3344	177	45°59′25″N 07°03′23″E	Mont Blanc massif	Valais	
155	Piz Ela	3339	515	46°36′07″N 09°42′27″E	Albula Alps	Graubünden	1865
156	Rosablanche	3336	227	46°03′36″N 07°21′15″E	Pennine Alps	Valais	
157	Piz Picuogl	3333	239	46°31′27″N 09°42′29″E	Albula Alps	Graubünden	
158	Mont Fort	3329	408	46°04′52″N 07°19′07″E	Pennine Alps	Valais	1866
159	Oberalpstock/Piz Tgietschen	3328	703	46°44′34″N 08°46′10″E	Glarus Alps	Graubünden/Uri	1793
160	Tschingelspitz	3315	190	46°30′40″N 07°50′23″E	Bernese Alps	Bern	
161	Piz Buin	3312	544	46°50′39″N 10°07′07″E	Silvretta Alps	Graubünden	1865
162	Garde de Bordon	3310	249	46°07′15″N 07°35′50″E	Pennine Alps	Valais	
163	Piz Badile	3308	262	46°17′41″N 09°35′10″E	Bregaglia Range	Graubünden	1867
164	Wilerhorn	3307	238	46°22′43″N 07°48′38″E	Bernese Alps	Valais	
165	Hienderstock	3307	208	46°35′08″N 08°12′58″E	Bernese Alps	Bern	
166	Piz Paradisin	3302	875	46°25′34″N 10°07′02″E	Livigno Alps	Graubünden	
167	Verstanclahorn	3298	375	46°50′06″N 10°04′21″E	Silvretta Alps	Graubünden	1866
168	Gross Schärhorn	3294	513	46°49′38″N 08°49′45″E	Glarus Alps	Uri	1842
169	Hangendgletscherhorn	3294	253	46°37′46″N 08°10′57″E	Bernese Alps	Bern	
170	Muttler	3293	703	46°54′02″N 10°22′43″E	Samnaun Alps	Graubünden	1859
171	Hockenhorn	3293	350	46°25′42″N 07°44′39″E	Bernese Alps	Bern/Valais	1840
172	Färichhorn	3292	248	46°09′20″N 07°51′32″E	Pennine Alps	Valais	
173	Cima della Bondasca	3289	187	46°17′16″N 09°37′18″E	Bregaglia Range	Graubünden	
174	Piz Fliana	3281	406	46°49′38″N 10°06′31″E	Silvretta Alps	Graubünden	1869
175	Pizzo Tambo/Tambohorn	3279	1164	46°29′49″N 09°17′00″E	Lepontine Alps	Graubünden	1828
176	Ritzlihorn	3277	322	46°37′56″N 08°15′32″E	Bernese Alps	Bern	1816
177	Hogleifa	3276	148	46°22′15″N 07°47′35″E	Bernese Alps	Valais	
	Wildi Frau	3274	155	46°30′N 07°47′E	Bernese Alps	Bern	
178	Basòdino	3272	959	46°24′41″N 08°28′07″E	Lepontine Alps	Ticino	1863
179	Helsenhorn	3272	586	46°18′17″N 08°11′30″E	Lepontine Alps	Valais	1863
180	Pointe d'Orny	3271	183	46°00′08″N 07°02′34″E	Mont Blanc massif	Valais	
181	Clariden	3267	413	46°50′31″N 08°52′17″E	Glarus Alps	Glarus/Uri	1863
182	Piz Üertsch	3267	396	46°35′47″N 09°50′11″E	Albula Alps	Graubünden	1847
183	Scima da Saoseo	3264	440	46°23′08″N 10°09′29″E	Livigno Alps	Graubünden	1894
184	Piz Languard	3262	947	46°29′18″N 09°57′23″E	Livigno Alps	Graubünden	1846
185	Piz Forbesch	3262	601	46°31′13″N 09°33′33″E	Oberhalbstein Alps	Graubünden	1893
186	Dents du Midi (Haute Cime)	3257	1796	46°09′40″N 06°55′24″E	Chablais Alps	Valais	1784
187	Gross Düssi/Piz Git	3256	429	46°47′30″N 08°49′39″E	Glarus Alps	Graubünden/Uri	1841
188	Piz Buin Pitschen	3256	205	46°50′32″N 10°06′44″E	Silvretta Alps	Graubünden	1868
189	Piz Tschütta/Stammerspitz	3254	406	46°54′13″N 10°20′35″E	Samnaun Alps	Graubünden	1884
190	Sasseneire	3254	386	46°08′19″N 07°31′31″E	Pennine Alps	Valais	1835
191	Cavistrau/Brigelser Hörner	3252	448	46°47′04″N 08°58′26″E	Glarus Alps	Graubünden	1865
192	Wildhorn	3250	981	46°21′21″N 07°21′44″E	Bernese Alps	Bern/Valais	1843
193	Ringelspitz/Piz Barghis	3247	843	46°53′54″N 09°20′35″E	Glarus Alps	Graubünden/St. Gallen	1865
194	Bächlistock	3246	197	46°35′11″N 08°14′23″E	Bernese Alps	Bern	
195	Piz Ot	3246	631	46°32′36″N 09°48′37″E	Albula Alps	Graubünden	1830
196	Wasenhorn / Punta Terrarossa	3246	476	46°15′59″N 08°05′08″E	Lepontine Alps	Valais	1844
197	Platthorn	3246	361	46°09′59″N 07°51′40″E	Pennine Alps	Valais	
198	Turbhorn	3246	228	46°24′29″N 08°16′50″E	Lepontine Alps	Valais	
199	Mattwaldhorn	3246	223	46°11′56″N 07°57′16″E	Pennine Alps	Valais	
200	Piz Bacun	3244	306	46°20′32″N 09°40′56″E	Bregaglia Range	Graubünden	1883
201	Silvrettahorn	3244	205	46°51′25″N 10°05′35″E	Silvretta Alps	Graubünden	1865
202	Wildstrubel	3244	816	46°24′01″N 07°31′43″E	Bernese Alps	Bern/Valais	1855
203	Grossstrubel	3243	157	46°24′46″N 07°33′45″E	Bernese Alps	Bern/Valais	
204	Titlis	3238	978	46°46′19″N 08°26′16″E	Uri Alps	Bern/Obwalden	1739
205	Grand Golliat	3238	313	45°51′33″N 07°06′06″E	Pennine Alps	Valais	1879
206	Ofenhorn / Punta d'Arbola	3235	334	46°23′12″N 08°19′07″E	Lepontine Alps	Valais	1864
207	Corn da Camp	3232	201	46°25′04″N 10°06′28″E	Livigno Alps	Graubünden	
208	Augstenberg/Piz Blaisch Lunga	3230	432	46°51′52″N 10°12′14″E	Silvretta Alps	Graubünden	1881
209	Piz Bever	3230	283	46°31′20″N 09°45′34″E	Albula Alps	Graubünden	
210	Piz Vadret	3229	660	46°41′13″N 09°57′46″E	Albula Alps	Graubünden	1867
211	Bec des Rosses	3223	283	46°04′19″N 07°17′56″E	Pennine Alps	Valais	
212	Tour Sallière	3220	726	46°07′37″N 06°55′29″E	Chablais Alps	Valais	1858
213	Vorderes Plattenhorn (Ostgipfel)	3220	300	46°48′36″N 10°01′59″E	Silvretta Alps	Graubünden	1868
214	Rorspitzli	3220	255	46°41′26″N 08°31′22″E	Uri Alps	Uri	
215	Vogelberg	3218	303	46°28′42″N 09°03′55″E	Lepontine Alps	Graubünden/Ticino	1864
216	Diablerets	3216	974	46°18′14″N 07°11′20″E	Vaud Alps	Valais/Vaud	1850
217	Chammliberg	3215	194	46°50′12″N 08°50′42″E	Glarus Alps	Uri	
218	Monte del Forno	3214	446	46°20′18″N 09°43′29″E	Bregaglia Range	Graubünden	1876
219	Le Métailler	3213	302	46°06′14″N 07°21′37″E	Pennine Alps	Valais	
220	Pointe de Boveire	3212	178	45°59′40″N 07°14′24″E	Pennine Alps	Valais	
221	Piz Medel	3211	952	46°37′06″N 08°54′40″E	Lepontine Alps	Graubünden/Ticino	1865
222	Scherbadung/Pizzo Cervandone	3211	716	46°19′27″N 08°13′23″E	Lepontine Alps	Valais	1886
223	Piz Timun /Pizzo d'Emet	3209	823	46°28′01″N 09°24′34″E	Oberhalbstein Alps	Graubünden	1884
224	Piz Cambrialas	3208	364	46°47′22″N 08°51′07″E	Glarus Alps	Graubünden	1905
225	Munt Pers	3207	242	46°25′17″N 09°57′13″E	Bernina Range	Graubünden	
226	Signalhorn	3207	162	46°50′56″N 10°05′49″E	Silvretta Alps	Graubünden	
227	Piz Sesvenna	3204	1055	46°42′21″N 10°24′10″E	Sesvenna Alps	Graubünden	
228	Piz Arblatsch	3203	235	46°32′08″N 09°34′37″E	Oberhalbstein Alps	Graubünden	
229	Puntone dei Fraciòn	3202	157	46°28′16″N 09°05′07″E	Lepontine Alps	Graubünden/Ticino	
230	Schwarzhorn	3201	308	46°13′00″N 07°45′24″E	Pennine Alps	Valais	
231	Piz Blaisun	3200	235	46°36′11″N 09°51′46″E	Albula Alps	Graubünden	
232	Strahlhorn	3201	213	46°23′10″N 07°50′30″E	Bernese Alps	Valais	
233	Hinteres Plattenhorn	3200	155	46°48′34″N 10°02′39″E	Silvretta Alps	Graubünden	
234	Piz Vadret	3199	308	46°30′32″N 09°57′03″E	Livigno Alps	Graubünden	
235	Gross Spannort	3198	616	46°47′12″N 08°31′28″E	Uri Alps	Uri	1867
236	Dreiländerspitze	3197	306	46°51′03″N 10°08′41″E	Silvretta Alps	Graubünden	1853
237	Piz Surgonda	3196	210	46°30′36″N 09°43′30″E	Albula Alps	Graubünden	
238	Bortelhorn/ Punta del Rebbio	3194	430	46°17′41″N 08°07′31″E	Lepontine Alps	Valais	1869
239	Bütlasse	3194	175	46°31′07″N 07°49′12″E	Bernese Alps	Bern	
240	Pizzo Rotondo	3192	752	46°31′03″N 08°27′58″E	Lepontine Alps	Ticino/Valais	1869
241	Hübschhorn I	3192	325	46°14′13″N 08°03′19″E	Lepontine Alps	Valais	
242	Wellhorn	3191	240	46°39′21″N 08°08′31″E	Bernese Alps	Bern	
243	Scopi	3190	792	46°34′18″N 08°49′48″E	Lepontine Alps	Graubünden/Ticino	1782
244	Piz Fedoz	3190	207	46°21′35″N 09°44′26″E	Bernina Range	Graubünden	
245	Spechhorn / Pizzo d'Antigine	3189	355	46°00′44″N 08°00′04″E	Pennine Alps	Valais	
246	Gärstenhörner	3189	200	46°35′54″N 08°21′42″E	Uri Alps	Bern/Valais	
247	Piz Surlej	3188	433	46°27′12″N 09°50′35″E	Bernina Range	Graubünden	1846
248	Gross Windgällen	3187	552	46°48′26″N 08°43′56″E	Glarus Alps	Uri	1848
249	Krone	3187	243	46°52′33″N 10°13′55″E	Silvretta Alps	Graubünden	
250	Dent Jaune	3186	184	46°09′58″N 06°55′46″E	Chablais Alps	Valais	
251	Hillehorn	3181	257	46°18′11″N 08°08′25″E	Lepontine Alps	Valais	
252	Piz Murtaröl	3180	679	46°34′13″N 10°17′15″E	Ortler Alps	Graubünden	1893
253	Ferdenrothorn	3180	268	46°24′32″N 07°42′28″E	Bernese Alps	Valais	
254	Piz Tasna	3179	371	46°51′33″N 10°15′08″E	Silvretta Alps	Graubünden	1849
255	Cime de l'Est	3178	169	46°10′21″N 06°56′50″E	Chablais Alps	Valais	
256	Piz Sarsura	3178	164	46°41′30″N 09°59′41″E	Albula Alps	Graubünden	
257	Hoch Horefellistock	3175	154	46°40′10″N 08°28′30″E	Uri Alps	Canton of Uri	
258	Pizzo di Zocca	3174	170	46°17′23″N 09°38′59″E	Bregaglia Range	Graubünden	
259	Piz Pisoc	3173	922	46°44′40″N 10°16′46″E	Sesvenna Alps	Graubünden	1865
260	Corn da Tinizong /Tinzenhorn	3173	474	46°36′42″N 09°40′16″E	Albula Alps	Graubünden	1866
261	Gletscherkamm	3173	182	46°50′34″N 10°05′06″E	Silvretta Alps	Graubünden	
262	Piz Tavrü	3168	851	46°40′45″N 10°17′46″E	Sesvenna Alps	Graubünden	1893
263	Piz Vial	3168	465	46°37′55″N 08°58′09″E	Lepontine Alps	Graubünden	1873
264	Wyssegga	3168	178	46°11′56″N 07°44′54″E	Pennine Alps	Valais	
265	Piz Plavna Dadaint	3167	490	46°42′31″N 10°13′25″E	Sesvenna Alps	Graubünden	1891
266	Piz Albris	3166	318	46°27′51″N 09°57′48″E	Livigno Alps	Graubünden	
267	Piz Lagrev	3165	855	46°26′45″N 09°43′22″E	Albula Alps	Graubünden	1875
268	Piz Quattervals	3165	471	46°37′38″N 10°05′42″E	Livigno Alps	Graubünden	1848
269	Mazzaspitz	3164	247	46°27′54″N 09°34′26″E	Oberhalbstein Alps	Graubünden	
270	Steitalhorn	3164	172	46°12′14″N 07°45′37″E	Pennine Alps	Valais	
271	Piz Val Müra	3162	154	46°37′40″N 09°54′05″E	Albula Alps	Graubünden	
272	Cima Rossa	3161	236	46°26′38″N 09°05′13″E	Lepontine Alps	Graubünden/Ticino	
273	Piz Saluver	3161	226	46°31′50″N 09°47′44″E	Albula Alps	Graubünden	
274	Piz Mitgel	3159	445	46°36′51″N 09°38′48″E	Albula Alps	Graubünden	1867
275	Piz da la Margna	3159	273	46°22′55″N 09°43′48″E	Bernina Range	Graubünden	
276	Couronne de Bréona	3159	172	46°05′30″N 07°34′14″E	Pennine Alps	Valais	
277	Hausstock	3158	655	46°52′28″N 09°03′56″E	Glarus Alps	Glarus/Graubünden	1832
278	Piz di Pian	3158	237	46°27′18″N 09°16′20″E	Lepontine Alps	Graubünden	
279	Piz Muragl	3157	162	46°29′53″N 09°56′14″E	Livigno Alps	Graubünden	
280	Piz Chalchagn	3154	192	46°27′05″N 09°54′21″E	Bernina Range	Graubünden	
281	Piz Prüna	3153	317	46°29′14″N 09°59′14″E	Livigno Alps	Graubünden	
282	Zapporthorn	3152	152	46°28′47″N 09°06′45″E	Lepontine Alps	Graubünden	
283	Piz Terri	3149	390	46°36′00″N 09°02′03″E	Lepontine Alps	Graubünden/Ticino	1802
284	Becs de Bosson	3149	362	46°10′04″N 07°31′05″E	Pennine Alps	Valais	
285	Flüela Schwarzhorn	3146	609	46°44′09″N 09°56′30″E	Albula Alps	Graubünden	1835
286	Piz Mundin	3146	342	46°55′31″N 10°25′51″E	Samnaun Alps	Graubünden	1849
287	Steghorn	3147	279	46°25′00″N 07°35′03″E	Bernese Alps	Bern/Valais	
288	Piz Tea Fondada/Monte Cornaccia	3144	319	46°32′58″N 10°18′29″E	Ortler Alps	Graubünden	1883
289	Alpjuhorn	3144	264	46°22′02″N 07°54′31″E	Bernese Alps	Valais	
290	Piz Suvretta	3144	168	46°30′53″N 09°45′31″E	Albula Alps	Graubünden	
291	Chli Spannort	3140	230	46°46′49″N 08°31′00″E	Uri Alps	Uri	
292	Gross Ruchen	3138	397	46°48′37″N 08°46′29″E	Glarus Alps	Uri	1864
293	Piz Sarsura Pitschen	3134	211	46°42′15″N 09°59′52″E	Albula Alps	Graubünden	
294	Crasta Burdun	3134	159	46°31′25″N 09°56′44″E	Livigno Alps	Graubünden	
295	Hinter Schloss	3133	506	46°48′09″N 08°31′37″E	Uri Alps	Uri	1863
296	Piz Duan	3131	482	46°22′31″N 09°35′00″E	Oberhalbstein Alps	Graubünden	1859
297	Piz Grialetsch	3131	164	46°41′38″N 09°57′17″E	Albula Alps	Graubünden	
298	Pizzo di Cassimoi	3129	242	46°31′44″N 09°01′05″E	Lepontine Alps	Graubünden/Ticino	
299	Piz Bleis Marscha	3128	258	46°34′14″N 09°43′12″E	Livigno Alps	Graubünden	
300	Piz d'Esan	3127	235	46°37′27″N 10°03′38″E	Livigno Alps	Graubünden	
301	Piz Schumbraida	3125	315	46°32′34″N 10°20′18″E	Ortler Alps	Graubünden	1883
302	Fanellhorn	3124	301	46°32′52″N 09°07′50″E	Lepontine Alps	Graubünden	1859
303	Piz Nuna	3123	535	46°43′24″N 10°09′16″E	Sesvenna Alps	Graubünden	1886
304	Oldenhorn	3123	307	46°19′45″N 07°13′18″E	Vaud Alps	Bern/Valais/Vaud	
305	Gross Seehorn	3122	434	46°53′16″N 10°01′57″E	Silvretta Alps	Graubünden	1869
306	Piz da la Crappa	3122	250	46°43′58″N 10°15′52″E	Sesvenna Alps	Graubünden	
307	Piz Scharboda	3122	238	46°34′50″N 09°02′59″E	Lepontine Alps	Graubünden	
308	Schilthorn	3122	157	46°21′38″N 07°54′43″E	Bernese Alps	Valais	
309	Piz Aul	3121	395	46°37′22″N 09°07′30″E	Lepontine Alps	Graubünden	1801
310	Steinhüshorn	3121	182	46°40′04″N 08°19′56″E	Uri Alps	Bern	
311	Piz Gaglianera	3121	166	46°37′48″N 08°57′28″E	Lepontine Alps	Graubünden/Ticino	
312	Piz da l'Acqua	3118	310	46°36′40″N 10°08′20″E	Livigno Alps	Graubünden	1888
313	Piz Salteras	3111	220	46°34′54″N 09°42′30″E	Albula Alps	Graubünden	
314	Krönten	3108	330	46°46′56″N 08°34′10″E	Uri Alps	Uri	1868
315	Gletscherhorn (Note: The lowest col between equally high Gletscherhorn and Piz Gallagiun is the 383 m deep Passo de la Prasgnola. They share the 2694 m key col Pass da la Duana.)	3107	413	46°23′15″N 09°33′38″E	Oberhalbstein Alps	Graubünden	1849
316	Pizz Gallagiun/Galleggione	3107	413	46°22′01″N 09°29′16″E	Oberhalbstein Alps	Graubünden	1861
317	Ruchi	3107	170	46°51′55″N 09°02′43″E	Glarus Alps	Glarus/Graubünden	
318	Vordere Helse	3106	167	46°18′54″N 08°10′55″E	Lepontine Alps	Valais	
319	Piz Lischana	3105	286	46°46′11″N 10°20′42″E	Sesvenna Alps	Graubünden	
320	Piz la Stretta / Monte Breva	3104	314	46°28′36″N 10°02′41″E	Livigno Alps	Graubünden	
321	Piz Zadrell	3104	164	46°48′46″N 10°03′19″E	Silvretta Alps	Graubünden	
322	Heimstock	3102	180	46°48′24″N 08°52′10″E	Glarus Alps	Graubünden/Uri	
323	Piz Albana	3100	230	46°28′52″N 09°46′25″E	Albula Alps	Graubünden	
324	Piz Segnas	3099	607	46°54′28″N 09°14′23″E	Glarus Alps	Glarus/Graubünden	1861
325	Gross Muttenhorn	3099	292	46°32′48″N 08°25′38″E	Lepontine Alps	Uri/Valais	
326	Piz Madlain	3099	159	46°44′23″N 10°20′21″E	Sesvenna Alps	Graubünden	
327	Piz Grisch	3098	171	46°31′03″N 09°47′07″E	Albula Alps	Graubünden	
328	Piz Rots	3097	279	46°55′31″N 10°18′58″E	Samnaun Alps	Graubünden	
329	Piz Giuv / Schattig Wichel	3096	749	46°42′07″N 08°41′33″E	Glarus Alps	Graubünden/Uri	1804
330	Löffelhorn	3096	167	46°31′36″N 08°14′13″E	Bernese Alps	Bern/Valais	
331	Piz Serra	3095	238	46°36′39″N 10°06′20″E	Livigno Alps	Graubünden	
332	Piz Cristanas	3092	239	46°44′04″N 10°23′32″E	Sesvenna Alps	Graubünden	
333	Piz Foraz	3092	238	46°41′27″N 10°16′37″E	Sesvenna Alps	Graubünden	
334	Flüela Wisshorn	3085	632	46°45′44″N 09°58′00″E	Silvretta Alps	Graubünden	1880
335	Cima da Lägh /Cima di Lago	3083	422	46°22′35″N 09°27′40″E	Oberhalbstein Alps	Graubünden	
336	Gischihorn	3083	160	46°18′58″N 08°12′53″E	Pennine Alps	Valais	
337	Tellispitza	3081	182	46°27′05″N 07°49′01″E	Bernese Alps	Valais	
338	Pointe de Tourtemagne	3080	206	46°12′16″N 07°39′42″E	Pennine Alps	Valais	
339	Lochberg	3079	225	46°37′30″N 08°29′53″E	Uri Alps	Uri	
340	Bocktschingel	3079	179	46°50′57″N 08°53′37″E	Glarus Alps	Glarus/Uri	
341	Chüealphorn	3078	472	46°41′07″N 09°54′19″E	Albula Alps	Graubünden	1877
342	Piz Surparé	3078	241	46°27′54″N 09°35′44″E	Oberhalbstein Alps	Graubünden	
343	Pointe du Tsaté	3078	162	46°06′34″N 07°32′56″E	Pennine Alps	Valais	
344	Hirsihorn	3076	162	46°11′13″N 07°39′32″E	Pennine Alps	Valais	
345	Piz Starlex	3075	779	46°39′46″N 10°23′33″E	Sesvenna Alps	Graubünden	
346	Piz Sena	3075	344	46°21′11″N 10°06′36″E	Livigno Alps	Graubünden	1901
347	Piz Posta Biala	3074	260	46°46′47″N 08°56′03″E	Glarus Alps	Graubünden	
348	Bristen	3073	567	46°44′13″N 08°40′52″E	Glarus Alps	Uri	1823
349	Pizzo Campo Tencia	3072	754	46°25′47″N 08°43′34″E	Lepontine Alps	Ticino	1867
350	Piz Chaschauna	3071	289	46°34′31″N 10°04′43″E	Livigno Alps	Graubünden	
351	Chüebodenhorn	3070	316	46°30′29″N 08°27′11″E	Lepontine Alps	Ticino/Valais	
352	Piz Minschun	3068	269	46°49′54″N 10°14′28″E	Silvretta Alps	Graubünden	
353	Gross Leckihorn	3068	222	46°32′09″N 08°27′51″E	Lepontine Alps	Uri/Valais	
354	Müeterlishorn	3066	285	46°37′30″N 08°29′53″E	Uri Alps	Uri	
355	Piz Radönt	3065	185	46°43′21″N 09°57′21″E	Albula Alps	Graubünden	
356	Hoch Ducan	3063	324	46°41′22″N 09°51′05″E	Albula Alps	Graubünden	1845
357	Cima dei Cogn	3063	177	46°25′56″N 09°05′19″E	Lepontine Alps	Graubünden/Ticino	
358	Geltenhorn	3062	305	46°20′47″N 07°20′04″E	Bernese Alps	Bern/Valais	
359	Stotzig Muttenhorn	3062	229	46°32′15″N 08°26′37″E	Lepontine Alps	Uri/Valais	
360	Piz dal Diavel	3062	176	46°37′21″N 10°08′21″E	Livigno Alps	Graubünden	
361	Pizzo Gallina	3061	378	46°29′41″N 08°23′31″E	Lepontine Alps	Ticino/Valais	
362	Piz Grisch	3060	544	46°31′52″N 09°28′22″E	Oberhalbstein Alps	Graubünden	1861
363	Piz Nair	3059	229	46°41′57″N 08°42′33″E	Glarus Alps	Graubünden/Uri	
364	Piz Fier	3059	153	46°35′52″N 10°05′52″E	Livigno Alps	Graubünden	
365	Piz Lavirun	3058	216	46°31′42″N 10°03′03″E	Livigno Alps	Graubünden	
366	Mont Ruan	3057	227	46°07′27″N 06°54′10″E	Chablais Alps	Valais	
367	Piz Nair	3057	184	46°30′23″N 09°47′15″E	Albula Alps	Graubünden	
368	Bruschghorn	3056	577	46°37′52″N 09°18′24″E	Lepontine Alps	Graubünden	
369	Usser Wissberg	3056	236	46°29′38″N 09°31′12″E	Oberhalbstein Alps	Graubünden	
370	Majinghorn	3053	231	46°23′28″N 07°41′21″E	Bernese Alps	Valais	
371	Diablon	3053	154	46°08′29″N 07°32′49″E	Pennine Alps	Valais	
372	Piz Forun	3052	458	46°39′19″N 09°51′54″E	Albula Alps	Graubünden	1847
373	Grand Muveran	3051	1013	46°14′14″N 07°07′34″E	Vaud Alps	Valais/Vaud	
374	Piz Minor	3049	584	46°27′04″N 10°01′42″E	Livigno Alps	Graubünden	
375	Piz dal Teo	3049	223	46°22′11″N 10°07′34″E	Livigno Alps	Graubünden	
376	Gross Lohner	3048	560	46°27′43″N 07°36′00″E	Bernese Alps	Bern	1875
377	Lorenzhorn	3048	179	46°31′33″N 09°07′32″E	Lepontine Alps	Graubünden	
378	Piz Laschadurella	3046	206	46°41′54″N 10°11′46″E	Sesvenna Alps	Graubünden	
379	Piz Bles	3045	190	46°23′54″N 09°28′01″E	Oberhalbstein Alps	Graubünden	
380	Piz Murtera	3044	449	46°46′31″N 10°02′26″E	Silvretta Alps	Graubünden	
381	Bocktenhorn	3044	196	46°42′26″N 09°54′10″E	Albula Alps	Graubünden	
382	Vernokhörner	3043	247	46°33′45″N 09°01′37″E	Lepontine Alps	Graubünden/Ticino	
383	Furggeltihorn	3043	180	46°32′03″N 09°03′47″E	Lepontine Alps	Graubünden	
384	Gross Wendenstock	3042	346	46°45′42″N 08°22′49″E	Uri Alps	Bern	1873
385	Piz Gannaretsch	3040	934	46°36′43″N 08°47′12″E	Lepontine Alps	Graubünden	
386	Chilchalphorn	3040	192	46°31′59″N 09°09′15″E	Lepontine Alps	Graubünden	
387	Alperschällihorn	3039	425	46°35′12″N 09°18′23″E	Lepontine Alps	Graubünden	1893
388	Piz Malmurainza	3038	229	46°54′22″N 10°24′26″E	Samnaun Alps	Graubünden	
	Mutthorn	3037	160	46°29′N 07°49′E	Bernese Alps	Bern	
389	Joderhorn	3036	190	45°59′46″N 07°59′21″E	Pennine Alps	Valais	
390	Piz Umbrail	3033	294	46°33′03″N 10°24′57″E	Ortler Alps	Graubünden	
391	Bürkelkopf	3033	229	46°59′22″N 10°20′49″E	Samnaun Alps	Graubünden	
392	Piz d'Immez	3033	168	46°44′28″N 10°22′42″E	Sesvenna Alps	Graubünden	
393	Sassal Mason	3032	203	46°23′24″N 10°00′49″E	Bernina Range	Graubünden	
394	Chlein Seehorn	3032	172	46°53′11″N 10°01′25″E	Silvretta Alps	Graubünden	
395	Piz S-chalembert	3031	722	46°48′03″N 10°24′48″E	Sesvenna Alps	Graubünden	
396	Piz Cotschen	3031	296	46°48′47″N 10°10′36″E	Silvretta Alps	Graubünden	
397	Frunthorn	3030	291	46°35′10″N 09°05′21″E	Lepontine Alps	Graubünden	
398	Selbsanft	3029	180	46°49′54″N 08°58′42″E	Glarus Alps	Glarus	
399	Piz Por	3028	733	46°30′34″N 09°23′03″E	Oberhalbstein Alps	Graubünden	1894
400	Bündner Vorab	3028	408	46°52′26″N 09°09′24″E	Glarus Alps	Glarus/Graubünden	1842
401	Piz dal Ras	3028	255	46°44′18″N 10°02′00″E	Albula Alps	Graubünden	
402	Piz Dolf	3028	250	46°54′12″N 09°16′00″E	Glarus Alps	Graubünden/St. Gallen	
403	Piz Davo Lais	3027	220	46°52′43″N 10°16′04″E	Silvretta Alps	Graubünden	
404	Piz Ault	3027	195	46°43′42″N 08°46′55″E	Glarus Alps	Graubünden/Uri	
405	Piz d'Arpiglias	3027	188	46°44′03″N 10°07′04″E	Sesvenna Alps	Graubünden	
406	Ginalshorn	3027	187	46°14′14″N 07°44′26″E	Pennine Alps	Valais	
407	Augstenhüreli	3027	162	46°41′30″N 09°54′11″E	Albula Alps	Graubünden	
408	Surettahorn	3027	156	46°30′35″N 09°21′45″E	Lepontine Alps	Graubünden	
409	Piz Cotschen	3026	269	46°32′29″N 10°27′31″E	Ortler Alps	Graubünden	
410	Piz Corbet	3025	672	46°22′47″N 09°16′49″E	Lepontine Alps	Graubünden	1892
411	Bella Tola	3025	235	46°13′53″N 07°38′46″E	Pennine Alps	Valais	
412	Ducangrat	3024	188	46°40′43″N 09°50′15″E	Albula Alps	Graubünden	
413	Wendenhorn	3023	311	46°45′14″N 08°26′37″E	Uri Alps	Bern/Uri	1884
414	Mont Gelé	3023	219	46°05′49″N 07°16′45″E	Pennine Alps	Valais	
415	Faltschonhorn	3022	249	46°36′45″N 09°06′54″E	Lepontine Alps	Graubünden	
416	Piz Vallatscha	3021	175	46°40′07″N 10°18′50″E	Sesvenna Alps	Graubünden	
417	Piz Blas	3019	312	46°34′38″N 08°43′41″E	Lepontine Alps	Graubünden/Ticino	1871
418	Tscheischhorn	3019	246	46°25′40″N 09°31′03″E	Oberhalbstein Alps	Graubünden	
419	Piz Murtelet	3019	188	46°40′13″N 09°52′06″E	Albula Alps	Graubünden	
420	Piz Turba	3018	253	46°24′37″N 09°36′20″E	Oberhalbstein Alps	Graubünden	
421	Piz Rondadura	3016	266	46°34′35″N 08°45′02″E	Lepontine Alps	Graubünden/Ticino	
422	Witenalpstock	3016	266	46°44′10″N 08°44′51″E	Glarus Alps	Graubünden/Uri	
423	Paraid Naira	3015	328	46°55′54″N 10°14′31″E	Silvretta Alps	Graubünden	1853
424	Piz Polaschin	3013	215	46°27′39″N 09°45′10″E	Albula Alps	Graubünden	
425	Piz Uffiern	3013	196	46°35′03″N 08°43′52″E	Lepontine Alps	Graubünden	
426	Tennbachhorn	3012	158	46°26′07″N 07°47′12″E	Bernese Alps	Valais	
427	Jufer Horen	3012	192	46°24′54″N 09°34′41″E	Oberhalbstein Alps	Graubünden	
428	Piz Nair	3010	238	46°40′05″N 10°16′21″E	Sesvenna Alps	Graubünden	
429	Piz Larain	3009	157	46°54′19″N 10°14′03″E	Silvretta Alps	Graubünden	
430	Piz Ravetsch	3007	292	46°35′03″N 08°42′11″E	Lepontine Alps	Graubünden	
431	Älplihorn	3006	426	46°42′39″N 09°49′33″E	Albula Alps	Graubünden	
432	Höhberghorn	3005	166	46°30′35″N 09°06′11″E	Lepontine Alps	Graubünden	
433	Piz Costainas	3004	199	46°33′46″N 10°28′25″E	Ortler Alps	Graubünden	
434	Reissend Nollen	3003	229	46°46′00″N 08°24′03″E	Uri Alps	Bern/Obwalden	
435	Pizzas d'Anarosa / Grauhörner	3002	366	46°35′56″N 09°18′57″E	Lepontine Alps	Graubünden	1894
436	Mittlere Lohner	3001	154	46°28′10″N 07°36′34″E	Bernese Alps	Bern	
437	Piz Mezzaun	3000	216	46°34′00″N 09°58′46″E	Livigno Alps	Graubünden	

== See also ==
- List of buildings and structures in Switzerland above 3000 m
