= Pointe de Vouasson =

Mountain in Switzerland

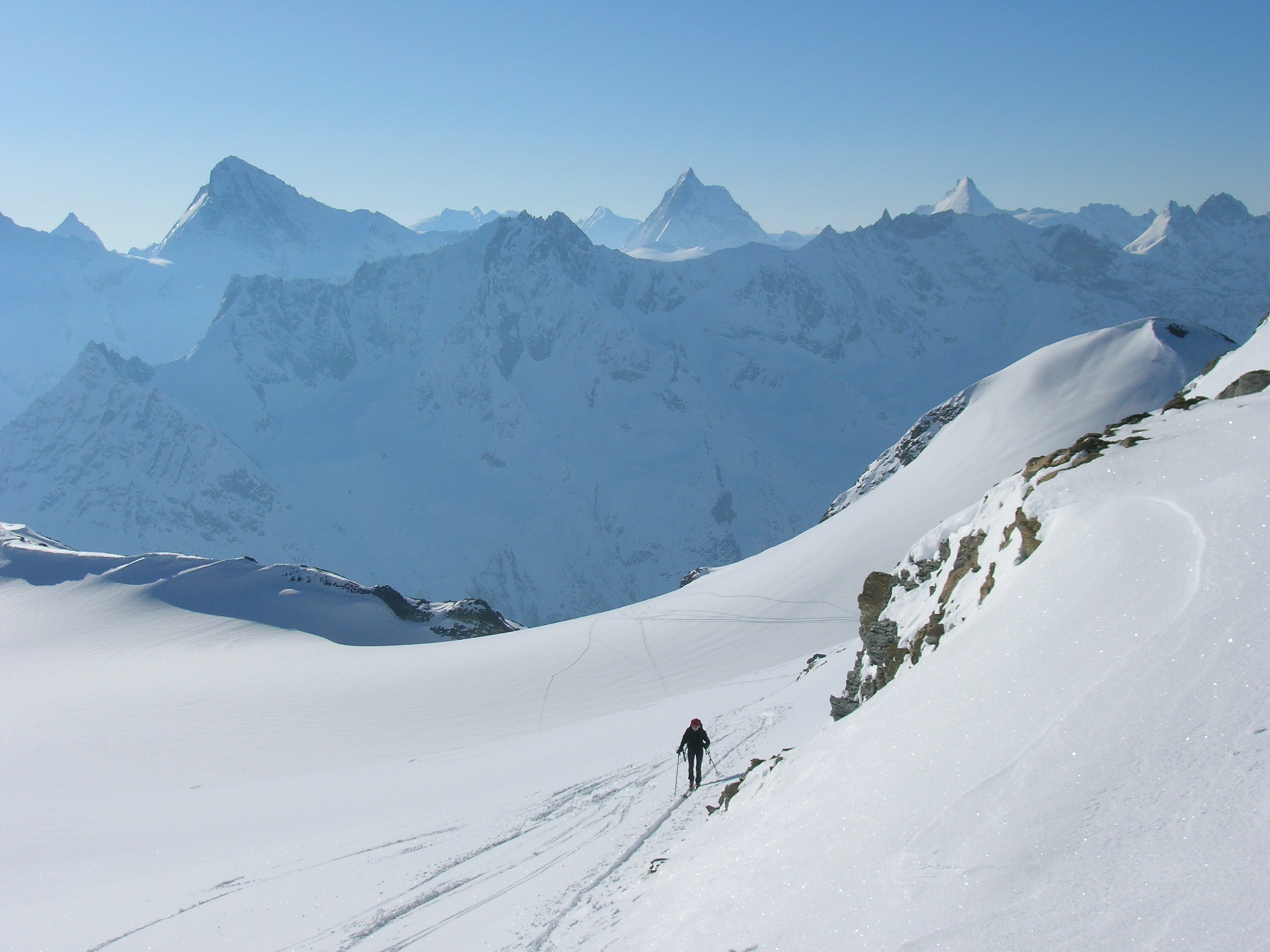
- View from near the summit

Highest point
- Elevation: 3,490 m (11,450 ft)
- Prominence: 154 m (505 ft)
- Parent peak: Aiguilles Rouges d'Arolla
- Coordinates: 46°4′19.8″N 7°25′30.8″E

Geography
- Location within Switzerland
- Location: Valais, Switzerland
- Parent range: Pennine Alps

The Pointe de Vouasson is a mountain of the Swiss Pennine Alps, overlooking Lac des Dix in the canton of Valais. It lies between the valleys of Hérémence (west) and Arolla (east), north of the Aiguilles Rouges d'Arolla.

The east side of the mountain is covered by a glacier named Glacier de Vouasson.
