= Gross Litzner =

Mountain in Switzerland

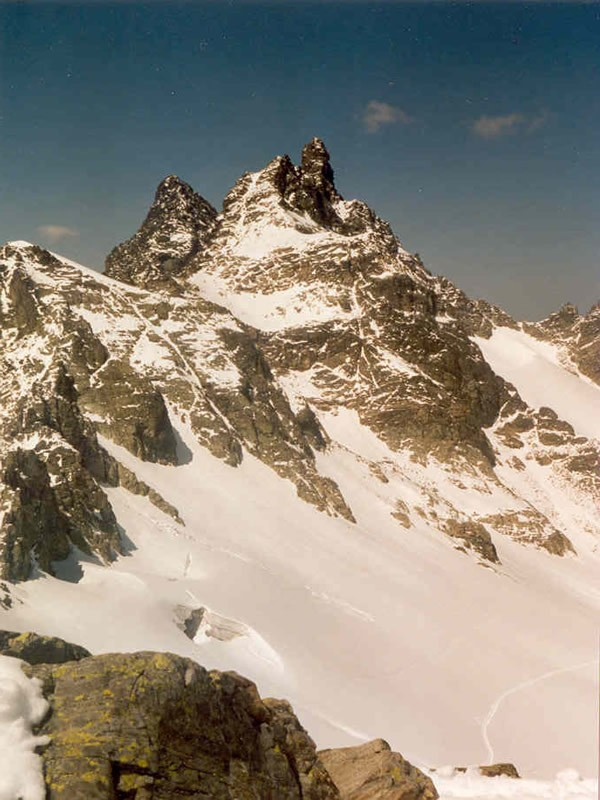
- Gross Litzner, July 1988

Highest point
- Elevation: 3,109 m (10,200 ft)
- Prominence: 109 m (358 ft)
- Parent peak: Gross Seehorn
- Coordinates: 46°53′10.9″N 10°02′18.6″E

Geography
- Location within Alps
- Location: Graubünden, Switzerland; Vorarlberg, Austria
- Parent range: Silvretta Alps

The Gross Litzner (also spelled Großlitzner in German) is a mountain in the Silvretta Alps, located on the border between Austria and Switzerland.
