= Platthorn =

Mountain in Switzerland

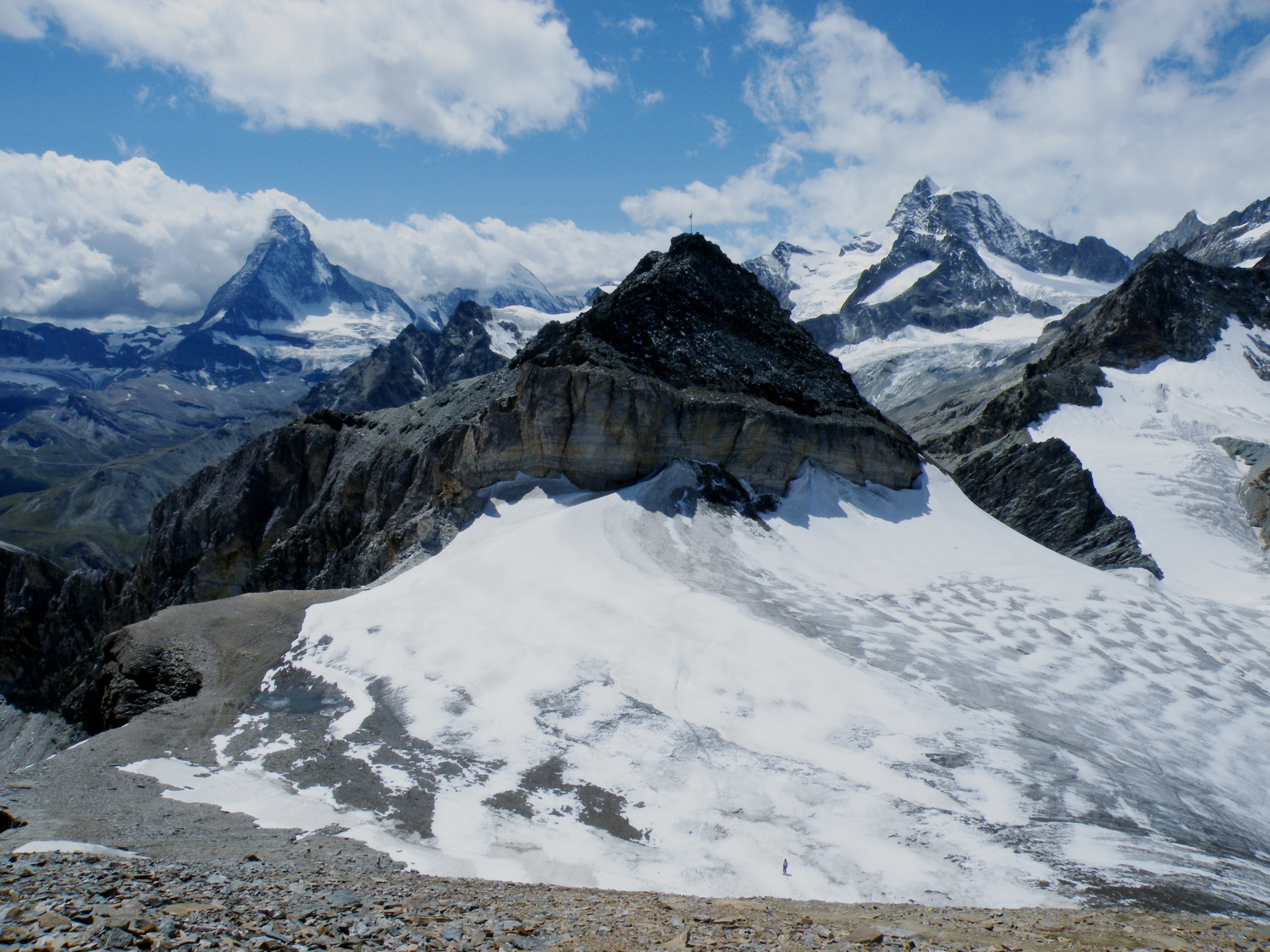

Highest point
- Elevation: 3,345 m (10,974 ft)
- Prominence: 361 m (1,184 ft)
- Parent peak: Monte Rosa
- Listing: Alpine mountains above 3000 m
- Coordinates: 46°3′13″N 7°44′11″E

Geography
- Location within Switzerland
- Location: Valais, Switzerland
- Parent range: Pennine Alps

The Platthorn is a mountain of the Swiss Pennine Alps, located south of Grächen in the canton of Valais. It lies north of the Färichhorn and the Balfrin, on the range between the Mattertal and the Saastal.
