= Chlein Seehorn =

Mountain in Switzerland

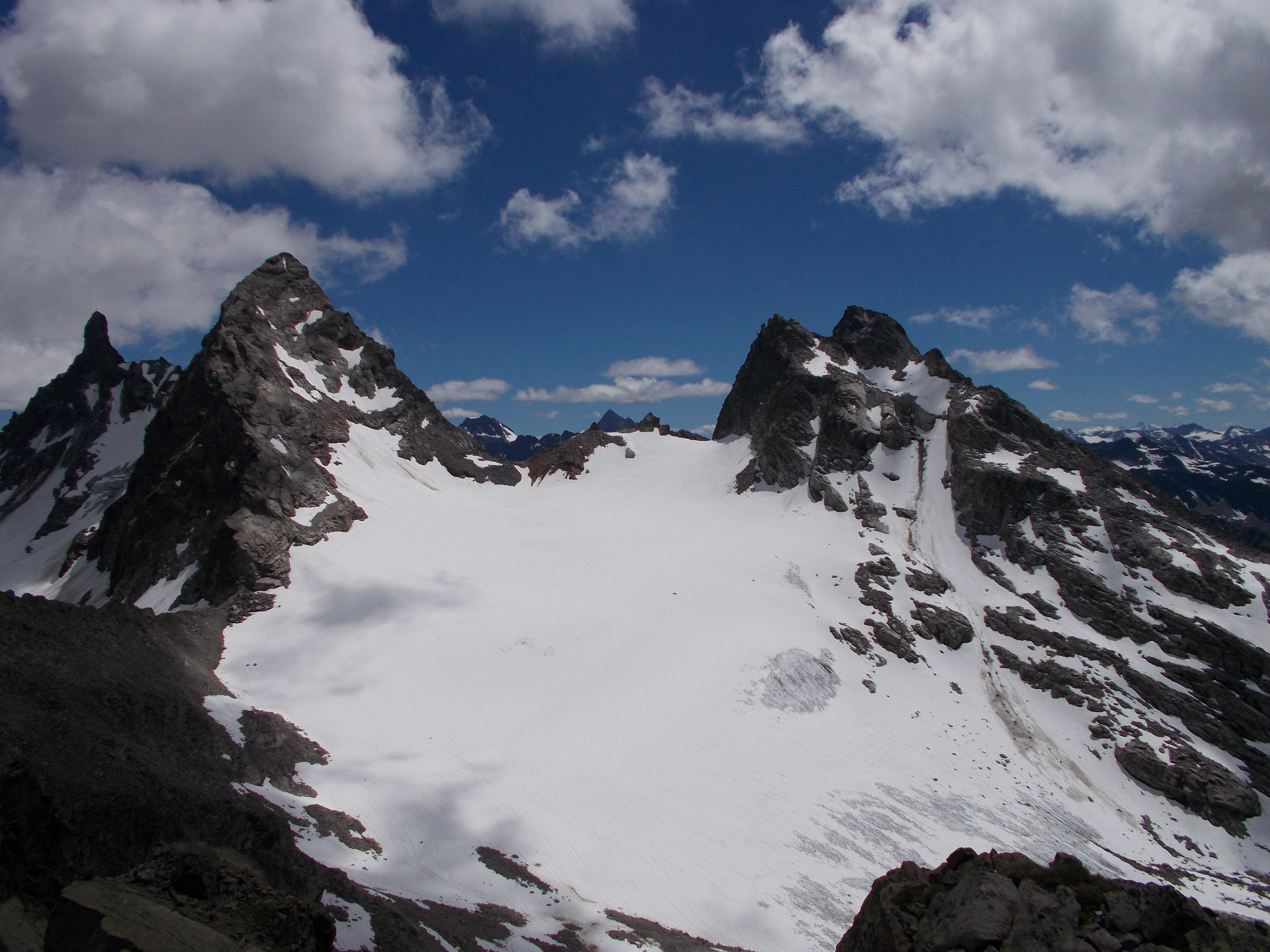
- Chlein Seehorn (r.) and Großes Seehorn (l.)

Highest point
- Elevation: 3,032 m (9,948 ft)
- Prominence: 172 m (564 ft)
- Parent peak: Gross Seehorn
- Coordinates: 46°53′11″N 10°01′25″E

Geography
- Location within Switzerland
- Location: Graubünden, Switzerland
- Parent range: Silvretta Alps

The Chlein Seehorn is a mountain of the Silvretta Alps, located east of Klosters in the canton of Graubünden. It lies west of the higher Gross Seehorn.
