= Piz Salteras =

Mountain in Switzerland

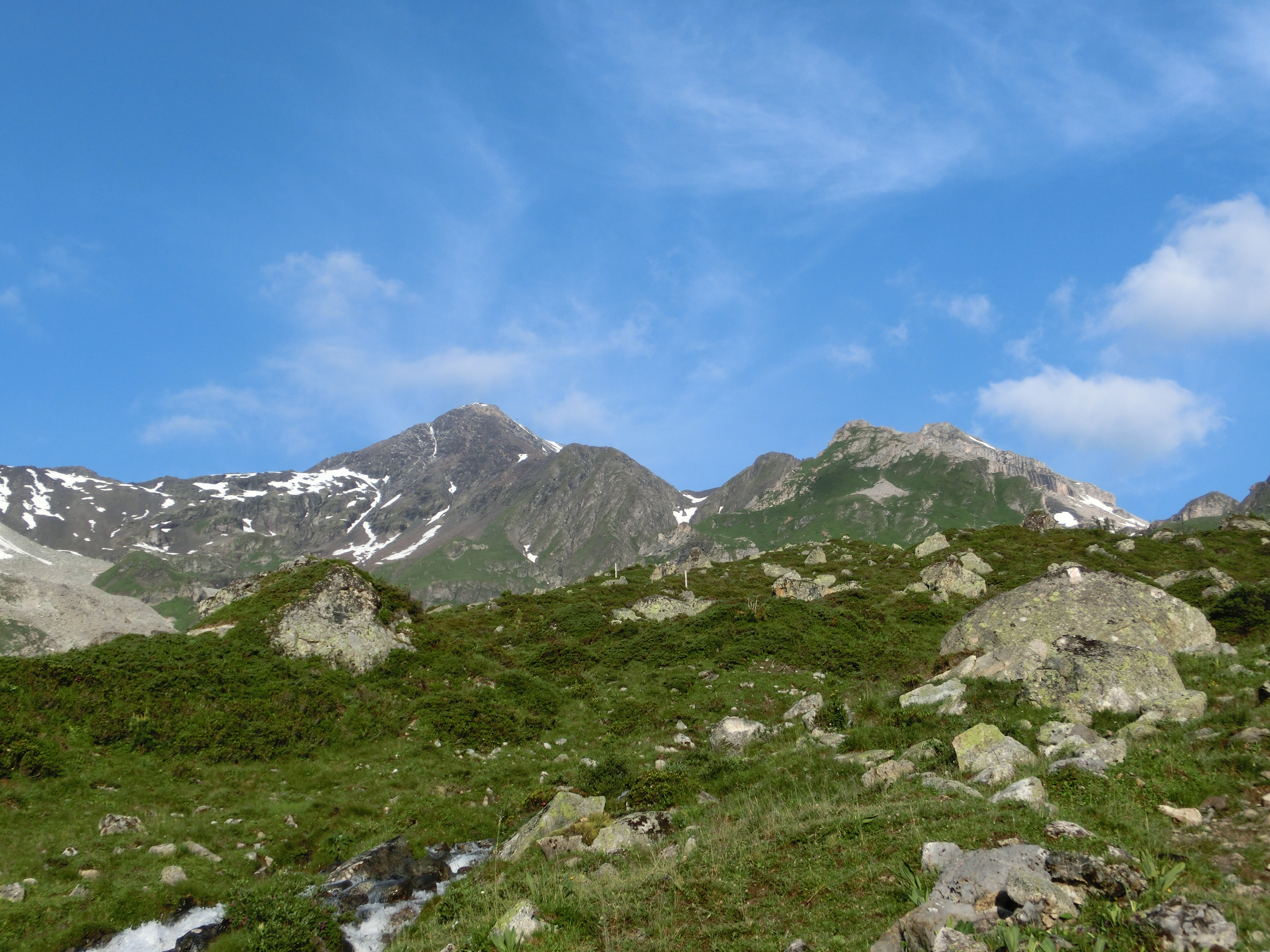
- Piz Salteras and Piz Val Lunga from Val Tschitta

Highest point
- Elevation: 3,111 m (10,207 ft)
- Prominence: 220 m (720 ft)
- Parent peak: Piz Bleis Marscha
- Coordinates: 46°34′53.5″N 9°42′29.5″E

Geography
- Location within Switzerland
- Location: Graubünden, Switzerland
- Parent range: Albula Alps

Piz Salteras is a mountain of the Albula Alps, located between Tinizong and Preda in the canton of Graubünden.
