= Stellihorn (Mattertal) =

Mountain in Switzerland

- Inners Stellihorn
- Location within Switzerland

Highest point
- Elevation: 3,410 m (11,190 ft)
- Prominence: 175 m (574 ft)
- Coordinates: 46°10′01″N 07°44′21.5″E

Geography
- Location: Valais, Switzerland
- Parent range: Pennine Alps

Climbing
- First ascent: Üssers: 5 August 1882 by Aloïs Pollinger of St. Niklaus in the canton Valais and J.S. Andersson; Inners: 23 August 1890 by Christian Almer, W.A.B. Coolidge, and Martin Conway

The Stellihorn is a mountain of the Swiss Pennine Alps, located west of St. Niklaus in the canton of Valais. It lies north of the Barrhorn, on the range between the Turtmanntal and the Mattertal.

The Stellihorn has two summits: the Inners Stellihorn (3,410 m) and the Üssers Stellihorn (3,405 m).
