= Piz Suvretta =

Mountain in Switzerland

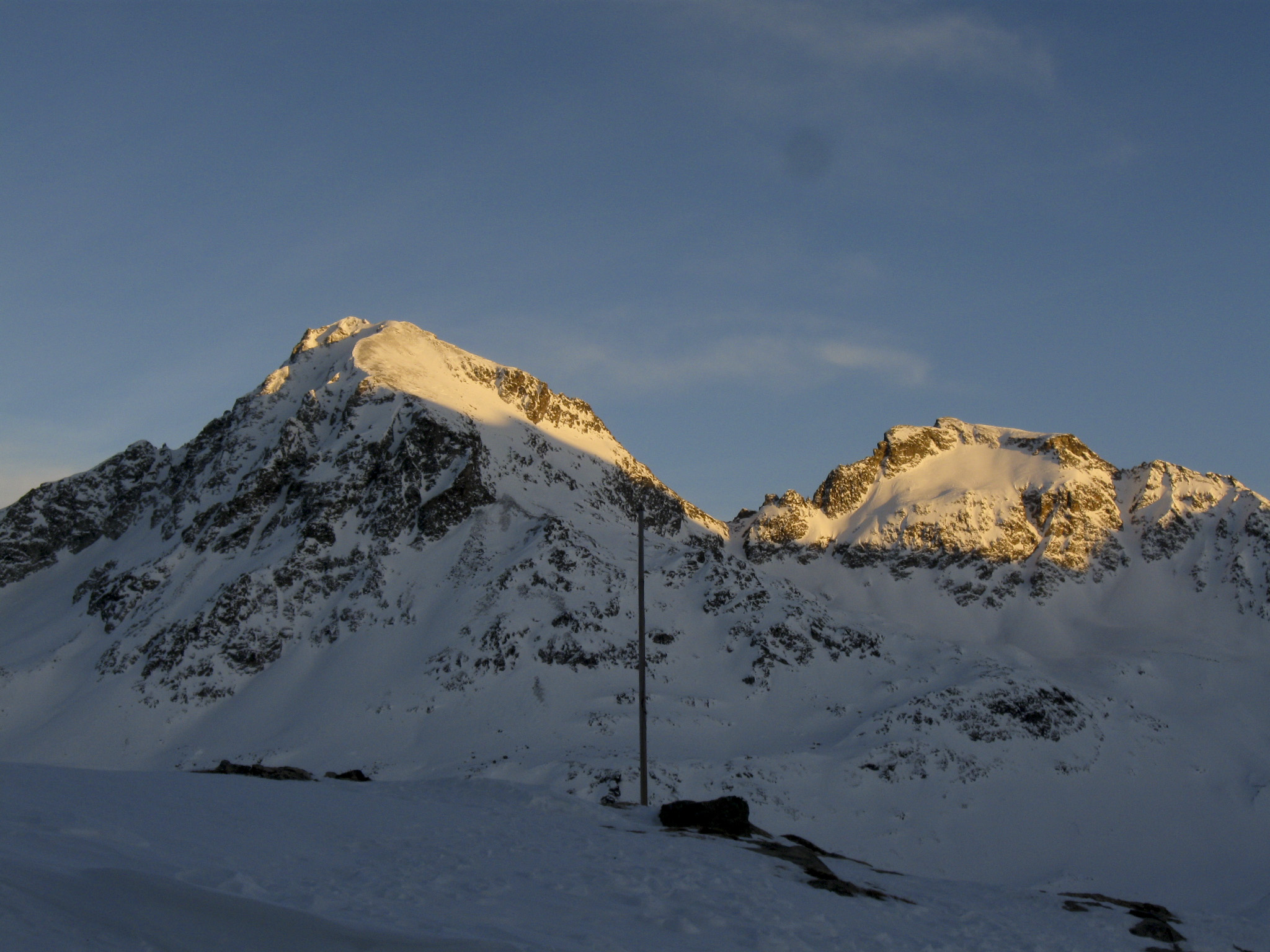
- Piz Bever (left) and Piz Suvretta (right)

Highest point
- Elevation: 3,144 m (10,315 ft)
- Prominence: 168 m (551 ft)
- Parent peak: Piz Bever
- Coordinates: 46°30′53″N 9°45′31″E

Geography
- Location within Switzerland
- Location: Graubünden, Switzerland
- Parent range: Albula Alps

Piz Suvretta is a mountain of the Albula Alps, located west of St. Moritz in the canton of Graubünden. It lies south of Piz Bever, on the range surrounding the Val Bever.
