= Piz Sarsura Pitschen =

Mountain in Switzerland

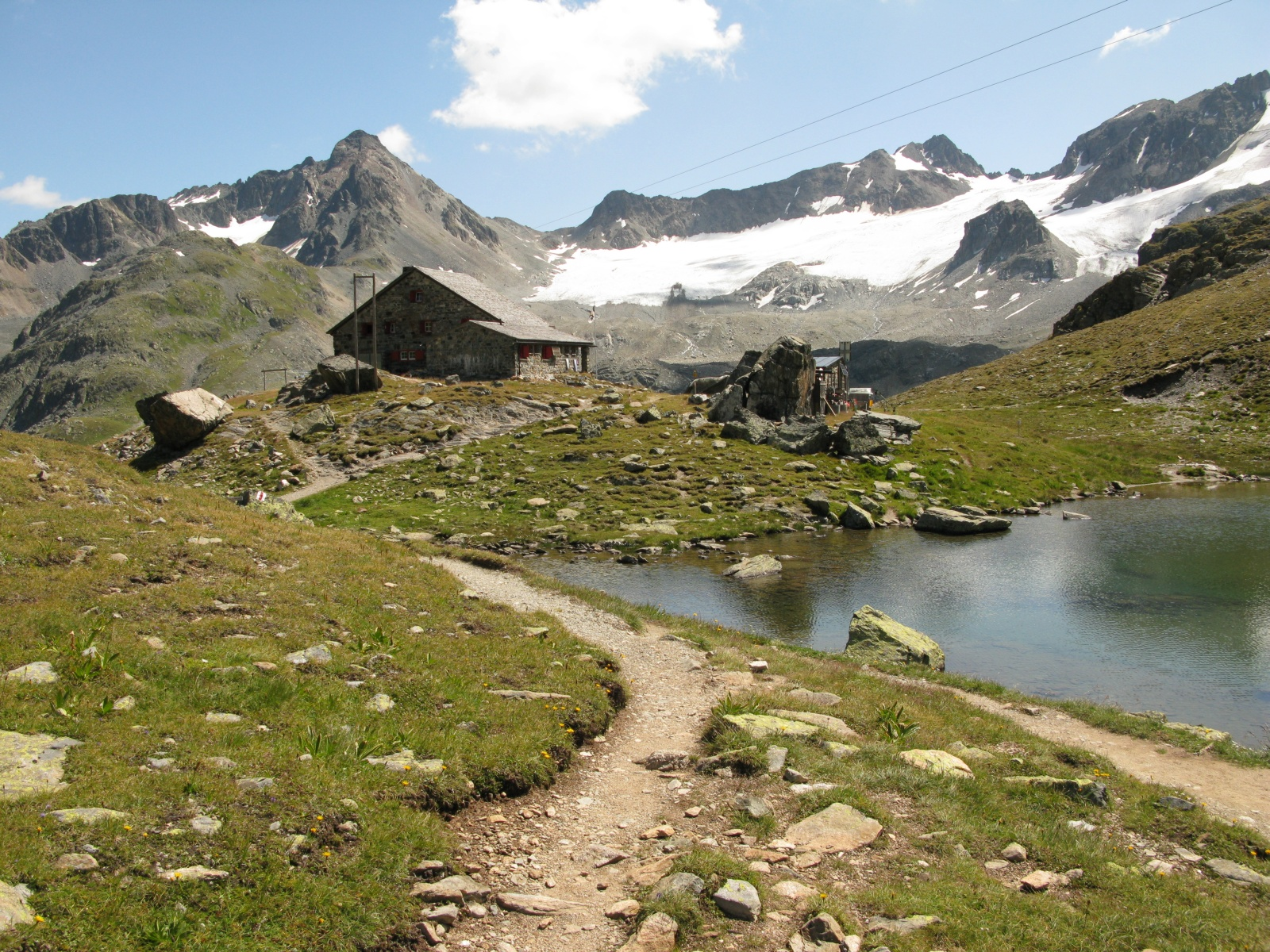
- Piz Sarsura Pitschen (left) from the Grialetsch hut

Highest point
- Elevation: 3,134 m (10,282 ft)
- Prominence: 211 m (692 ft)
- Parent peak: Piz Vadret
- Coordinates: 46°42′15″N 9°59′52″E

Geography
- Location within Switzerland
- Location: Graubünden, Switzerland
- Parent range: Albula Alps

Piz Sarsura Pitschen (3,134 m) (Romansh: "little Piz Sarsura") is a mountain of the Albula Alps, located west of Zernez in the canton of Graubünden. It lies north of Piz Sarsura, on the range between the Val Grialetsch and the Val Sarsura.
