= Heimstock =

Mountain in Switzerland

- Location within Switzerland

Highest point
- Elevation: 3,102 m (10,177 ft)
- Prominence: 180 m (590 ft)
- Parent peak: Clariden
- Coordinates: 46°48′24″N 8°52′10″E

Geography
- Location: Graubünden/Uri, Switzerland
- Parent range: Glarus Alps

The Heimstock (el. 3,102 metres) is a mountain of the Glarus Alps, located on the border between the Swiss cantons of Uri and Graubünden. It lies between the Maderanertal (Uri) and the Val Russein (Graubünden). On its northern side lies the Hüfi Glacier.
