= Sassal Mason =

Mountain in Switzerland

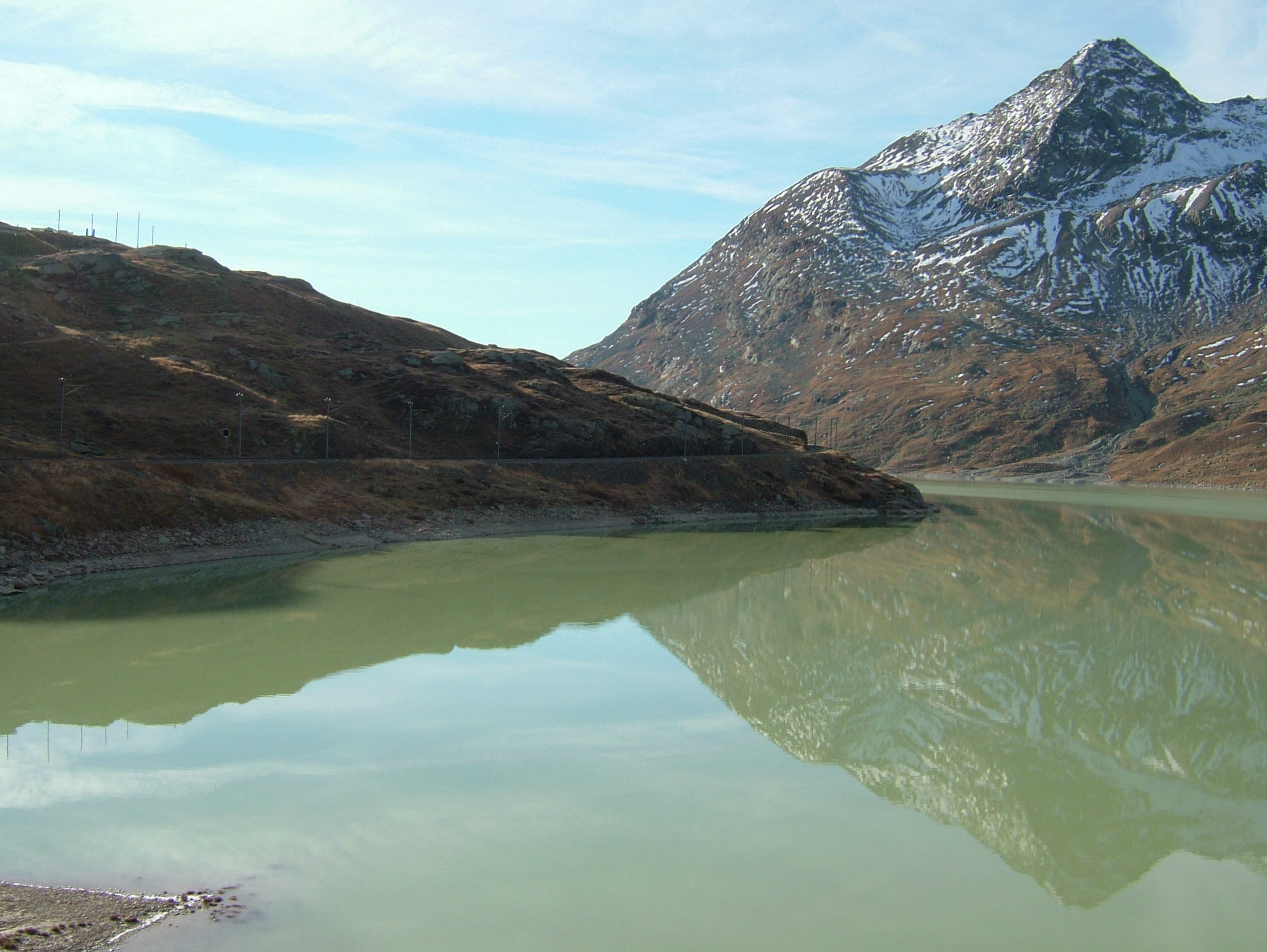
- View from Lago Bianco

Highest point
- Elevation: 3,032 m (9,948 ft)
- Prominence: 203 m (666 ft)
- Parent peak: Piz Bernina
- Coordinates: 46°23′24″N 10°0′49″E

Geography
- Location within Switzerland
- Location: Graubünden, Switzerland
- Parent range: Bernina Range

The Sassal Mason is a mountain in the Bernina Range of the Alps, overlooking the Lago Bianco and the Bernina Pass in the canton of Graubünden. It is situated at the eastern end of the Bernina Range, between the Engadin and the Val Poschiavo
