= Schwarzhorn (Mattertal) =

Mountain in Switzerland

- Location within Switzerland

Highest point
- Elevation: 3,201 m (10,502 ft)
- Prominence: 308 m (1,010 ft)
- Parent peak: Monte Rosa
- Listing: Alpine mountains above 3000 m
- Coordinates: 46°13′01″N 7°45′24″E

Geography
- Location: Valais, Switzerland
- Parent range: Pennine Alps

The Schwarzhorn is a mountain of the Swiss Pennine Alps, overlooking the Augstbord Pass in the canton of Valais. It lies on the range between the Turtmanntal and the Mattertal.
