= Strahlhorn (Baltschieder) =

- Location within Switzerland

Highest point
- Elevation: 3,201 m (10,502 ft)
- Prominence: 213 m (699 ft)
- Coordinates: 46°23′10″N 7°54′29.5″E

Geography
- Location: Valais
- Country: Switzerland
- Parent range: Bernese Alps
- Topo map: Swiss Federal Office of Topography swisstopo

The Strahlhorn (3,201 m) is a mountain of the Bernese Alps, located north of Baltschieder in the canton of Valais. It lies between the Baltschiedertal and the Gredetschtal, east of the Bietschhorn.
