= Piz Posta Biala =

Mountain in Switzerland

- Location within Switzerland

Highest point
- Elevation: 3,074 m (10,085 ft)
- Prominence: 260 m (850 ft)
- Parent peak: Tödi
- Coordinates: 46°46′47″N 8°56′03″E

Geography
- Location: Graubünden, Switzerland
- Parent range: Glarus Alps

Piz Posta Biala (3,074 m) is a mountain of the Glarus Alps, located north of Sumvitg in the canton of Graubünden. It lies on the range between the Val Russein and the Val Punteglias, south of Piz Urlaun.
