= Piz Saluver =

Mountain in Switzerland

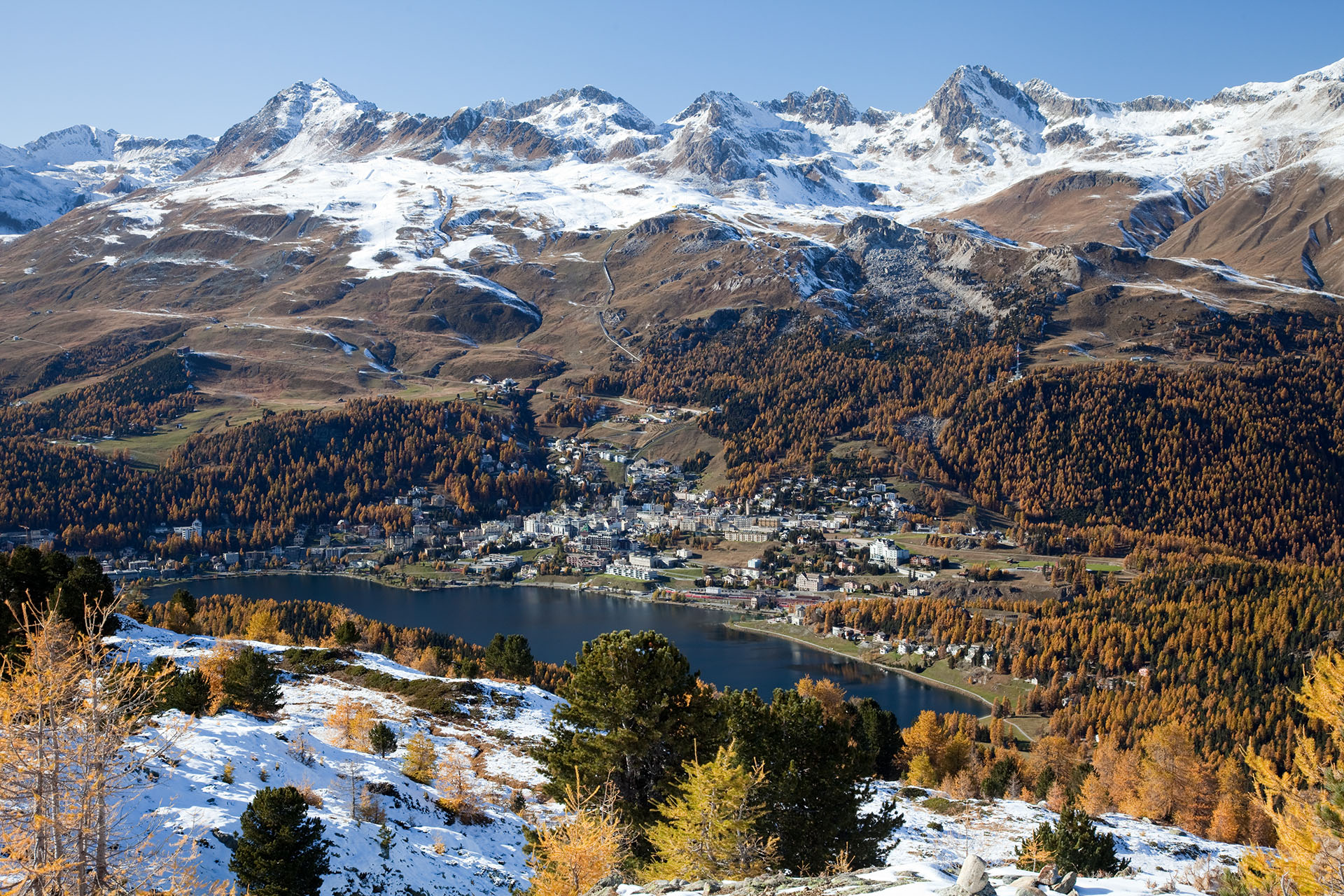
- View from Muottas da Schlarigna with Piz Nair (left) and Piz Saluver (right)

Highest point
- Elevation: 3,161 m (10,371 ft)
- Prominence: 226 m (741 ft)
- Parent peak: Piz Ot
- Coordinates: 46°31′50″N 9°47′44″E

Geography
- Location within Switzerland
- Location: Graubünden, Switzerland
- Parent range: Albula Alps

Piz Saluver (3,161 m) is a mountain of the Albula Alps, located west of Celerina in the canton of Graubünden. It lies between the Val Bever and the Val Saluver, both part of the Engadin.
