= Aiguilles Dorées =

Multi-summited mountain of the Mont Blanc massif

- Aiguille de la Varappe
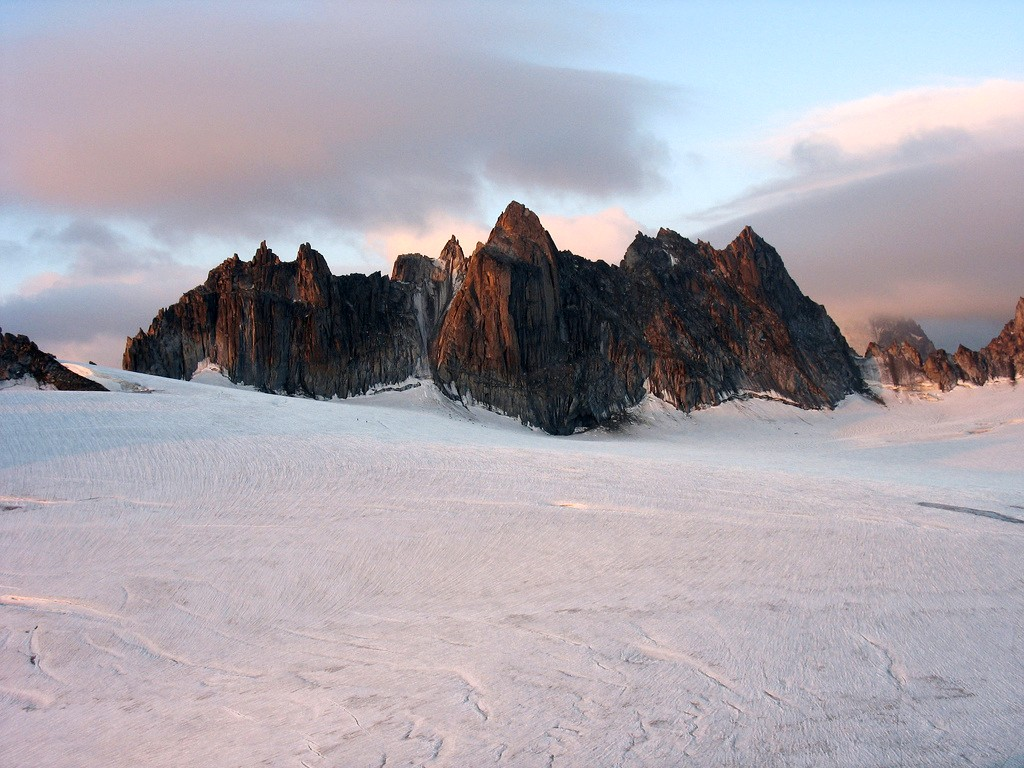
- The Aiguilles Dorées from the Plateau du Trient

Highest point
- Elevation: 3,519 m (11,545 ft)
- Prominence: 258 m (846 ft)
- Coordinates: 45°58′57″N 7°02′00″E

Geography
- Location within Switzerland
- Location: Valais, Switzerland
- Parent range: Mont Blanc Massif

The Aiguilles Dorées (3,519 m) are a multi-summited mountain of the Mont Blanc massif, overlooking the Plateau du Trient in the canton of Valais. They lie east of the Petite Fourche, on the range between the glaciers of Trient and Saleina.

The main (and westernmost) summit is named Aiguille de la Varappe. The other summits are the Tête Biselx (3,509 m) and Le Trident (3,436 m).
