= Piz Vallatscha =

Mountain in Switzerland

- Location within Switzerland

Highest point
- Elevation: 3,021 m (9,911 ft)
- Prominence: 175 m (574 ft)
- Parent peak: Piz Tavrü
- Coordinates: 46°40′07″N 10°18′50″E

Geography
- Location: Graubünden, Switzerland
- Parent range: Sesvenna Range

Piz Vallatscha is a mountain of the Sesvenna Range of the Alps, located north of the Ofen Pass in the canton of Graubünden.
