= Finsteraarrothorn =

Mountain in Switzerland

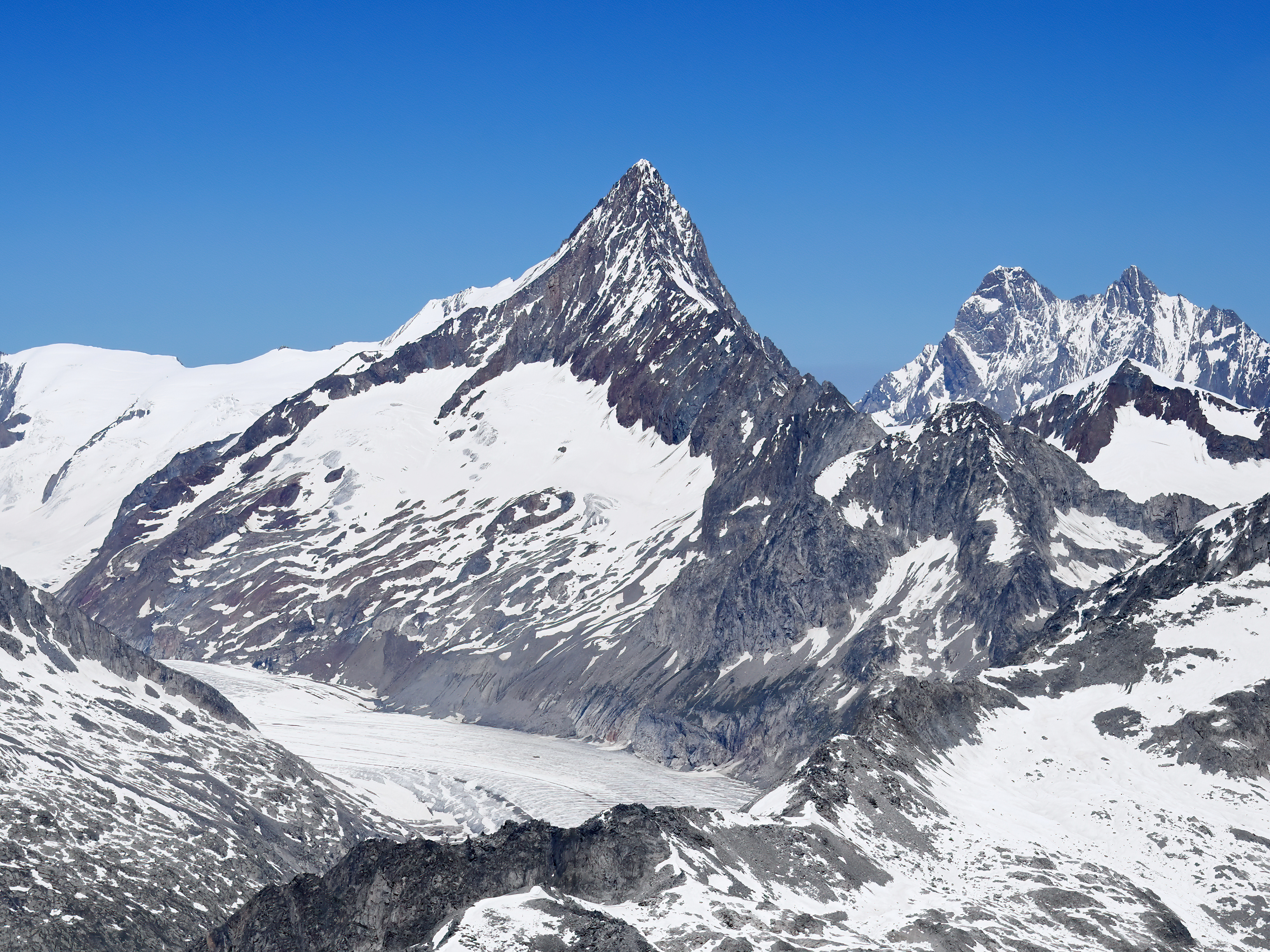
- Finsteraarrothorn (center right) and Finsteraarhorn

Highest point
- Elevation: 3,530 m (11,580 ft)
- Prominence: 195 m (640 ft)
- Parent peak: Finsteraarhorn
- Coordinates: 46°31′4″N 8°8′52″E

Geography
- Location within Switzerland
- Location: Valais, Switzerland
- Parent range: Bernese Alps

The Finsteraarrothorn (3,530 m) is a mountain of the Bernese Alps, overlooking the Fiescher Glacier in the canton of Valais. It lies at the southeastern end of the ridge descending from the Finsteraarhorn, between the Fiescher Glacier and the Studer Glacier.
