= Chammliberg =

Mountain in Switzerland

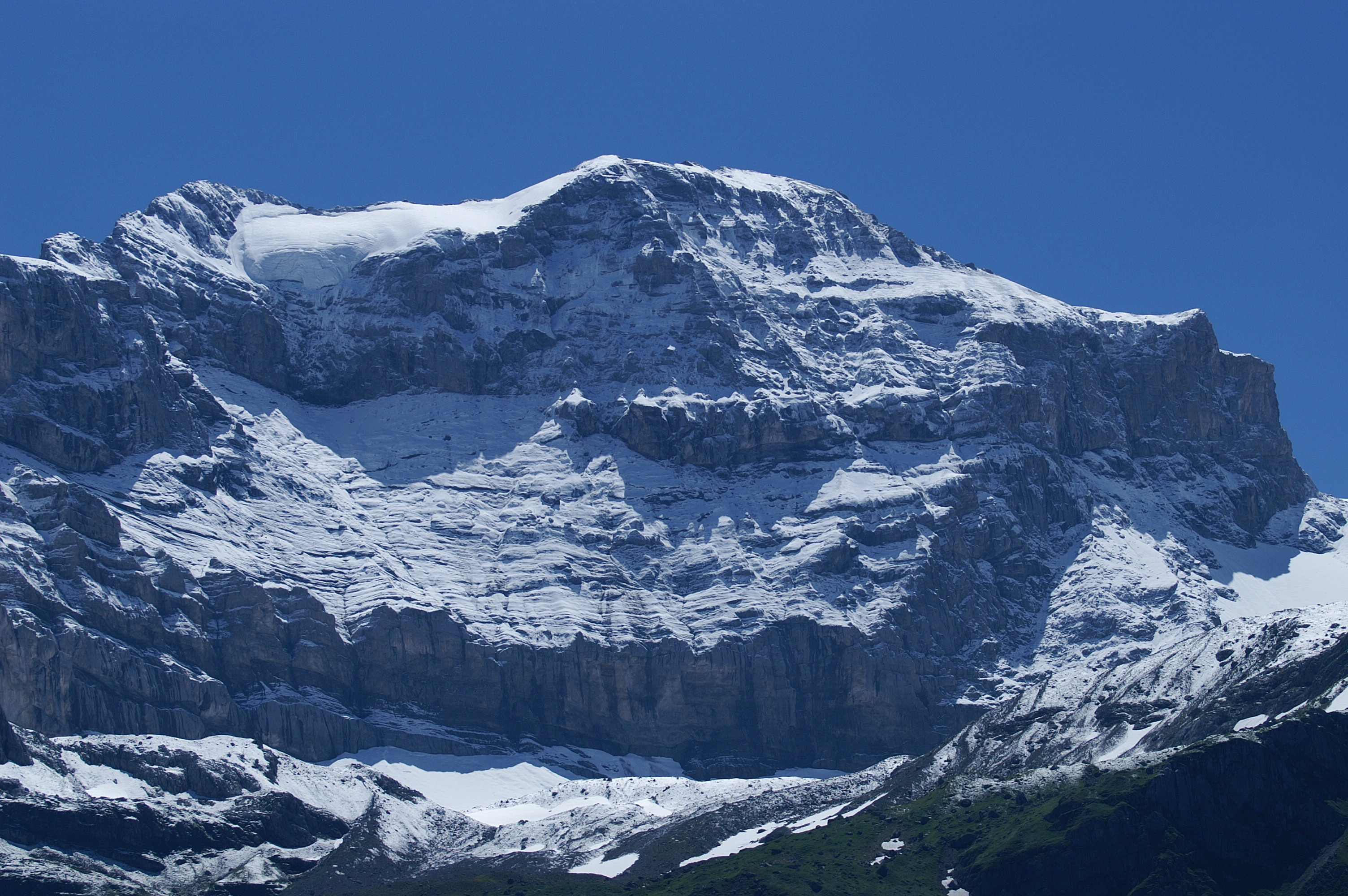
- The north-west face

Highest point
- Elevation: 3,215 m (10,548 ft)
- Prominence: 194 m (636 ft)
- Parent peak: Clariden
- Coordinates: 46°50′12″N 08°50′41.5″E

Geography
- Location within Switzerland
- Location: Uri, Switzerland
- Parent range: Glarus Alps

The Chammliberg is a mountain of the Glarus Alps, located south of the Klausen Pass in the canton of Uri. While the south side of the mountain is covered by the large Hüfi Glacier, the north-west side consists of an 800 metre high face.
