= Pointe du Tsaté =

Mountain in Switzerland

- Location within Switzerland

Highest point
- Elevation: 3,078 m (10,098 ft)
- Prominence: 162 m (531 ft)
- Parent peak: Sasseneire
- Coordinates: 46°06′34″N 7°32′56″E

Geography
- Location: Valais, Switzerland
- Parent range: Pennine Alps

The Pointe du Tsaté is a mountain of the Swiss Pennine Alps, overlooking Les Haudères in the canton of Valais. It lies between the valleys of Hérens and Moiry (part of Val d'Anniviers). On its east side is the lake of Moiry.
