= Hangendgletscherhorn =

Mountain of the Bernese Alps

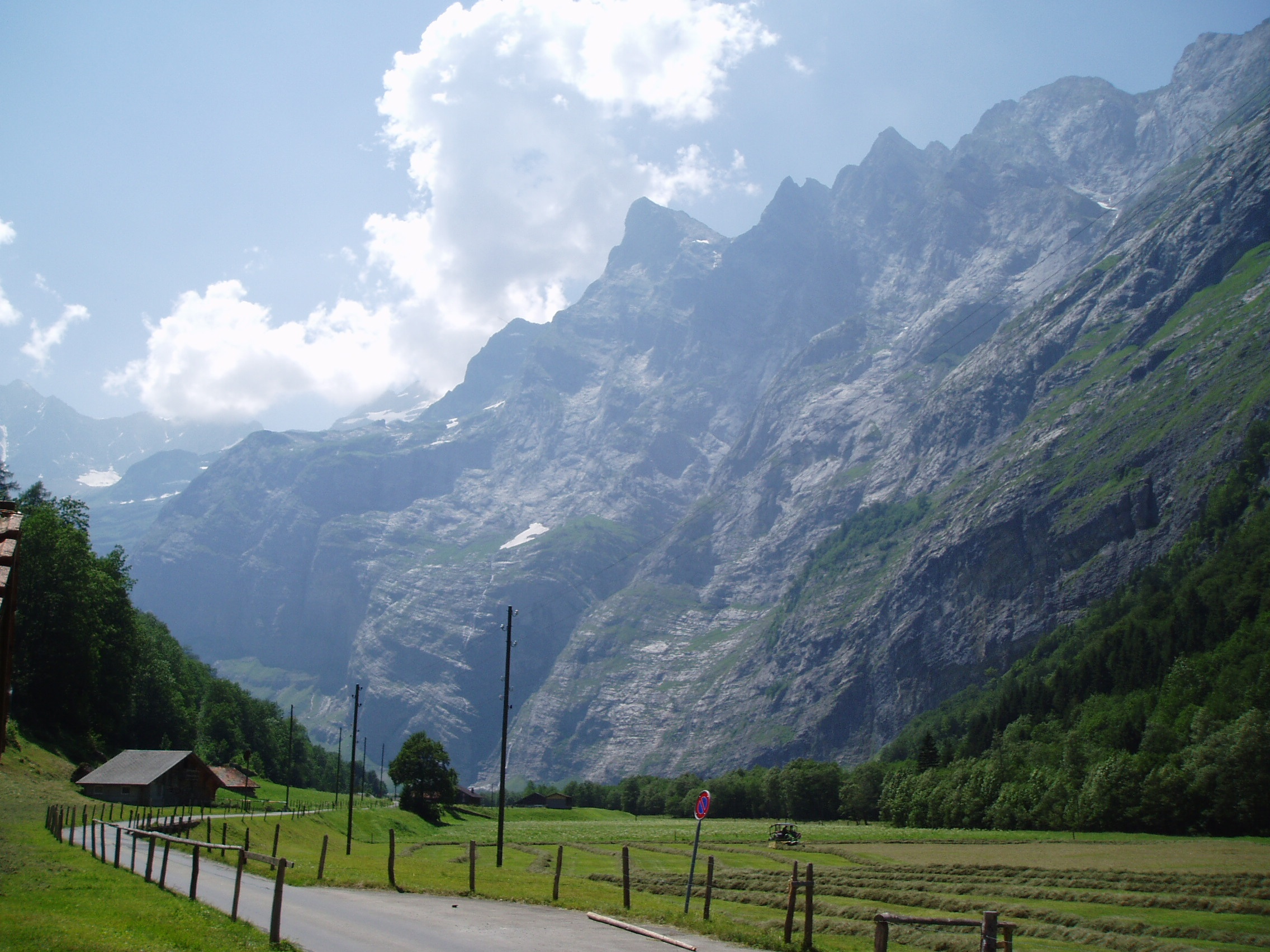
- The Hangendgletscherhorn (far left) from the Urbachtal

Highest point
- Elevation: 3,294 m (10,807 ft)
- Prominence: 253 m (830 ft)
- Parent peak: Finsteraarhorn
- Coordinates: 46°37′46″N 8°10′57″E

Geography
- Location within Switzerland
- Location: Bern, Switzerland
- Parent range: Bernese Alps

Climbing
- First ascent: 1788 by Johann Heinrich Weiss and Joachim Eugen Müller

The Hangendgletscherhorn is a mountain of the Bernese Alps, located in the Urbachtal in the canton of Bern. On its northern side it overlooks the Gauli Glacier.
