= Usser Wissberg =

Mountain in Switzerland

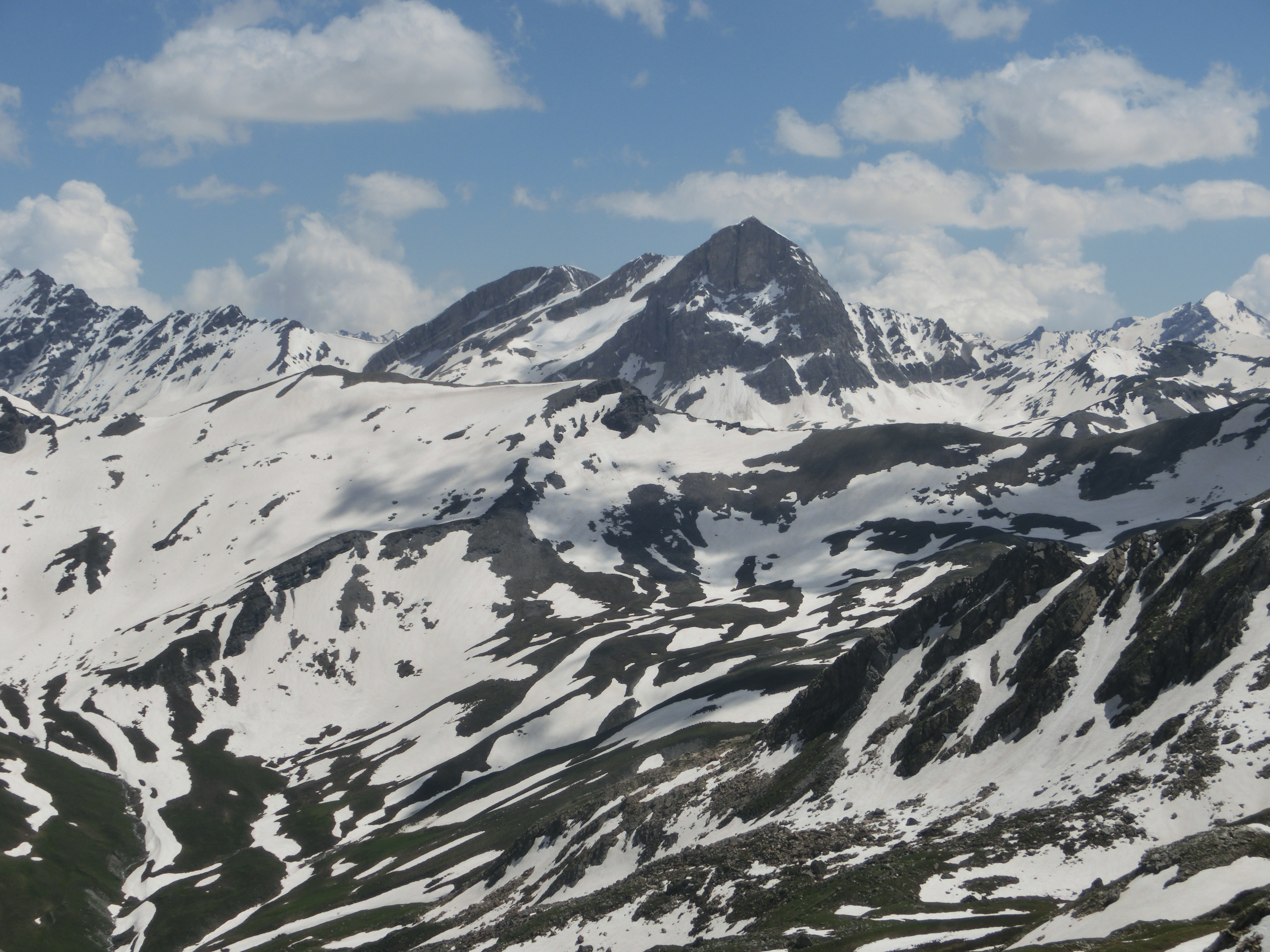
- Usser Wissberg as seen from Piz Settember.

Highest point
- Elevation: 3,053 m (10,016 ft)
- Prominence: 236 m (774 ft)
- Parent peak: Piz Platta
- Coordinates: 46°29′37″N 9°31′12″E

Geography
- Location within Switzerland
- Location: Graubünden, Switzerland
- Parent range: Oberhalbstein Alps

The Usser Wissberg is a mountain of the Oberhalbstein Alps, overlooking the Avers valley, west of Piz Platta, in the canton of Graubünden.

== Panorama ==
360° panorama from Usser Wissberg
