= Galmihorn =

Mountain in Switzerland

- Vorderes Galmihorn
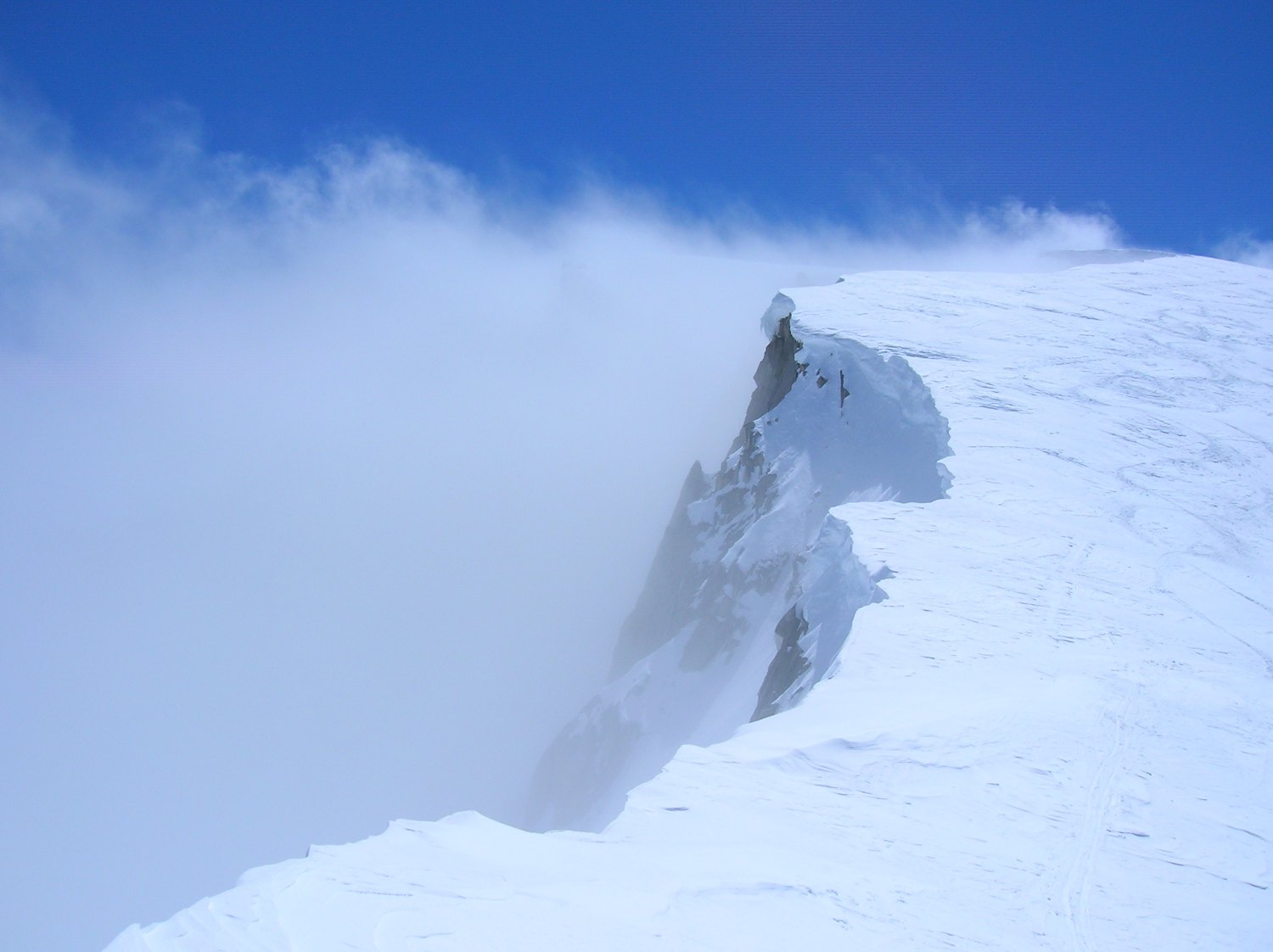
- Summit

Highest point
- Elevation: 3,507 m (11,506 ft)
- Prominence: 302 m (991 ft)
- Listing: Alpine mountains above 3000 m
- Coordinates: 46°30′24″N 8°11′5.4″E

Geography
- Location within Switzerland
- Location: Valais, Switzerland
- Parent range: Bernese Alps

The Galmihorn is a mountain of the Bernese Alps, overlooking the Fiescher Glacier in the canton of Valais. The main summit is distinguished by the name Vorderes Galmihorn and has an elevation of 3,507 metres. A secondary summit named Hinteres Galmihorn has an elevation of 3,488 metres.

The closest locality is Reckingen on the eastern side.
