= Hogleifa =

Mountain in Switzerland

- Location within Switzerland

Highest point
- Elevation: 3,276 m (10,748 ft)
- Prominence: 148 m (486 ft)
- Parent peak: Wilerhorn
- Coordinates: 46°22′15″N 7°47′35.2″E

Geography
- Location: Valais, Switzerland
- Parent range: Bernese Alps

The Hogleifa is a mountain in the Bernese Alps, overlooking the Lötschental in the canton of Valais. It lies at the western end of the Bietschhorn-Aletschhorn chain.
