= Gletscherchamm =

Mountain in Switzerland

- Location within Switzerland

Highest point
- Elevation: 3,173 m (10,410 ft)
- Prominence: 182 m (597 ft)
- Parent peak: Piz Buin
- Coordinates: 46°50′34″N 10°05′06″E

Geography
- Location: Graubünden, Switzerland
- Parent range: Silvretta Alps

The Gletscherchamm is a mountain of the Swiss Silvretta Alps, located between the Prättigau and the Engadin in the canton of Graubünden. It lies just west of the Silvretta Pass.
