= Egginer =

Mountain in Switzerland

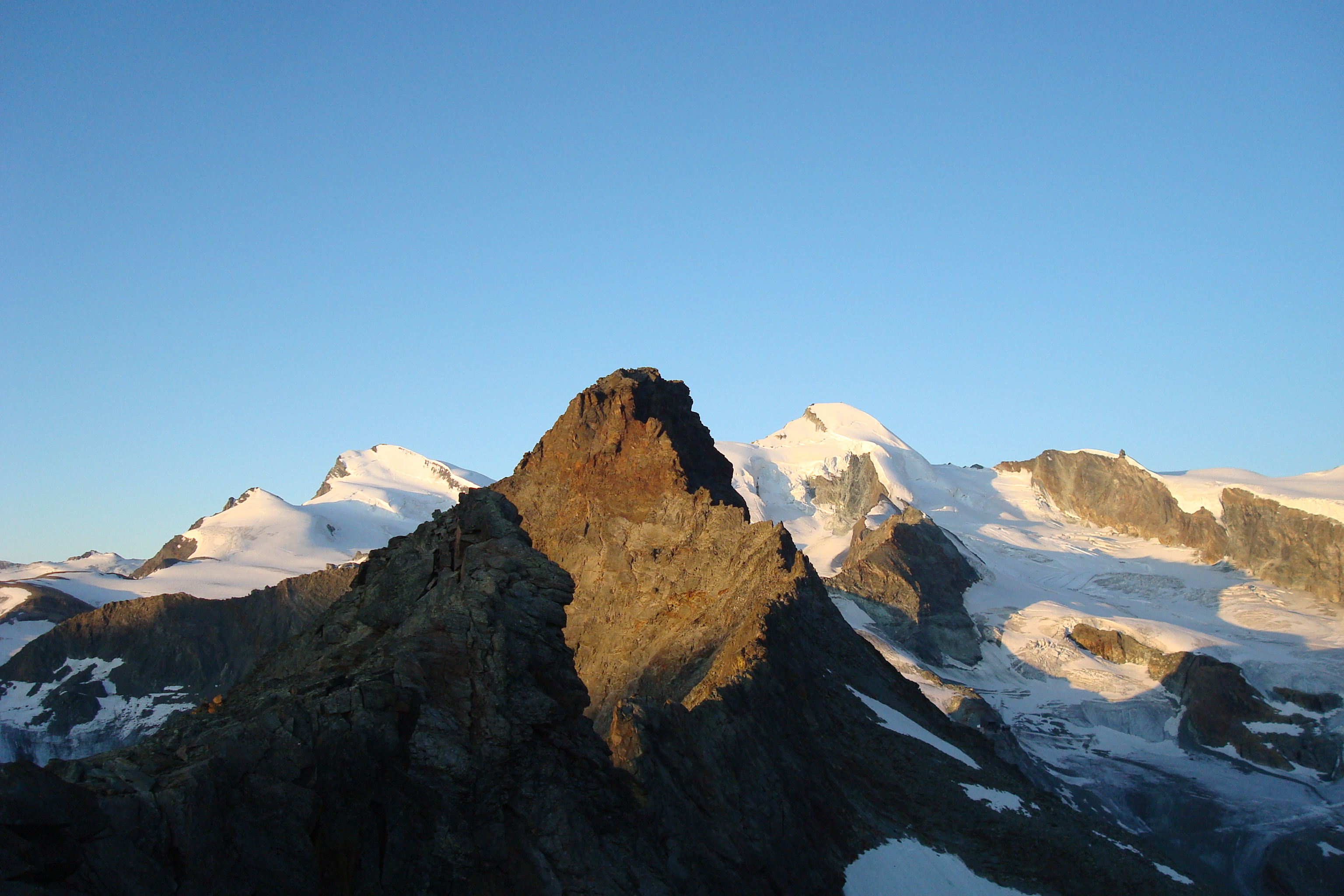
- View from the Mittaghorn (south side) with the Allalinhorn in background

Highest point
- Elevation: 3,367 m (11,047 ft)
- Prominence: 378 m (1,240 ft)
- Parent peak: Dom
- Listing: Alpine mountains above 3000 m
- Coordinates: 46°04′30.1″N 7°55′47.3″E

Geography
- Location within Switzerland
- Location: Valais, Switzerland
- Parent range: Pennine Alps

The Egginer is a mountain of the Swiss Pennine Alps, overlooking Saas-Fee in the canton of Valais.
