= Pizzo di Zocca =

Mountain in Switzerland

- by Walter Mittelholzer in 1823

Highest point
- Elevation: 3,174 m (10,413 ft)
- Prominence: 170 m (560 ft)
- Parent peak: Piz Cengalo
- Coordinates: 46°17′23″N 09°38′59″E

Geography
- Location within Alps
- Location: Graubünden, Switzerland; Lombardy, Italy
- Parent range: Bregaglia Range

Pizzo di Zocca is a mountain of the Bregaglia Range, located on the border between Switzerland and Italy. Its summit lies between the valleys of Albigna (in the Swiss canton of Graubünden) and Val di Mello (in the Italian region of Lombardy).
