= Piz Bleis Marscha =

Mountain in Switzerland

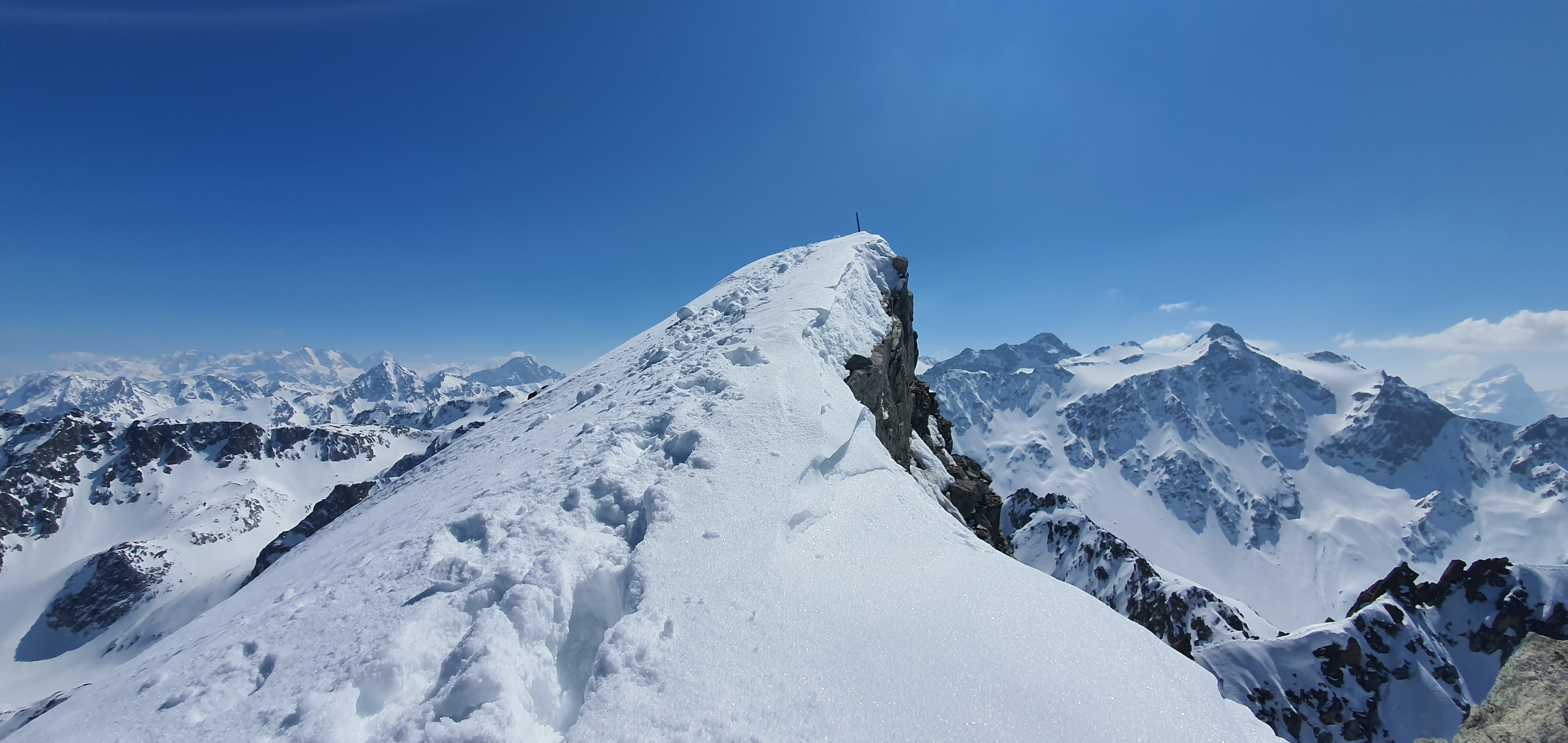
- Summit of Piz Bleis Marscha.

Highest point
- Elevation: 3,128 m (10,262 ft)
- Prominence: 258 m (846 ft)
- Parent peak: Piz Calderas
- Coordinates: 46°34′13.5″N 9°43′11.7″E

Geography
- Location within Switzerland
- Location: Graubünden, Switzerland
- Parent range: Albula Range

Piz Bleis Marscha is a mountain of the Albula Alps, located in the Swiss canton of Graubünden. It is located south of Piz Ela, on the range between Savognin and Bergün.
