= Aiguilles Rouges d'Arolla =

Mountain in Switzerland

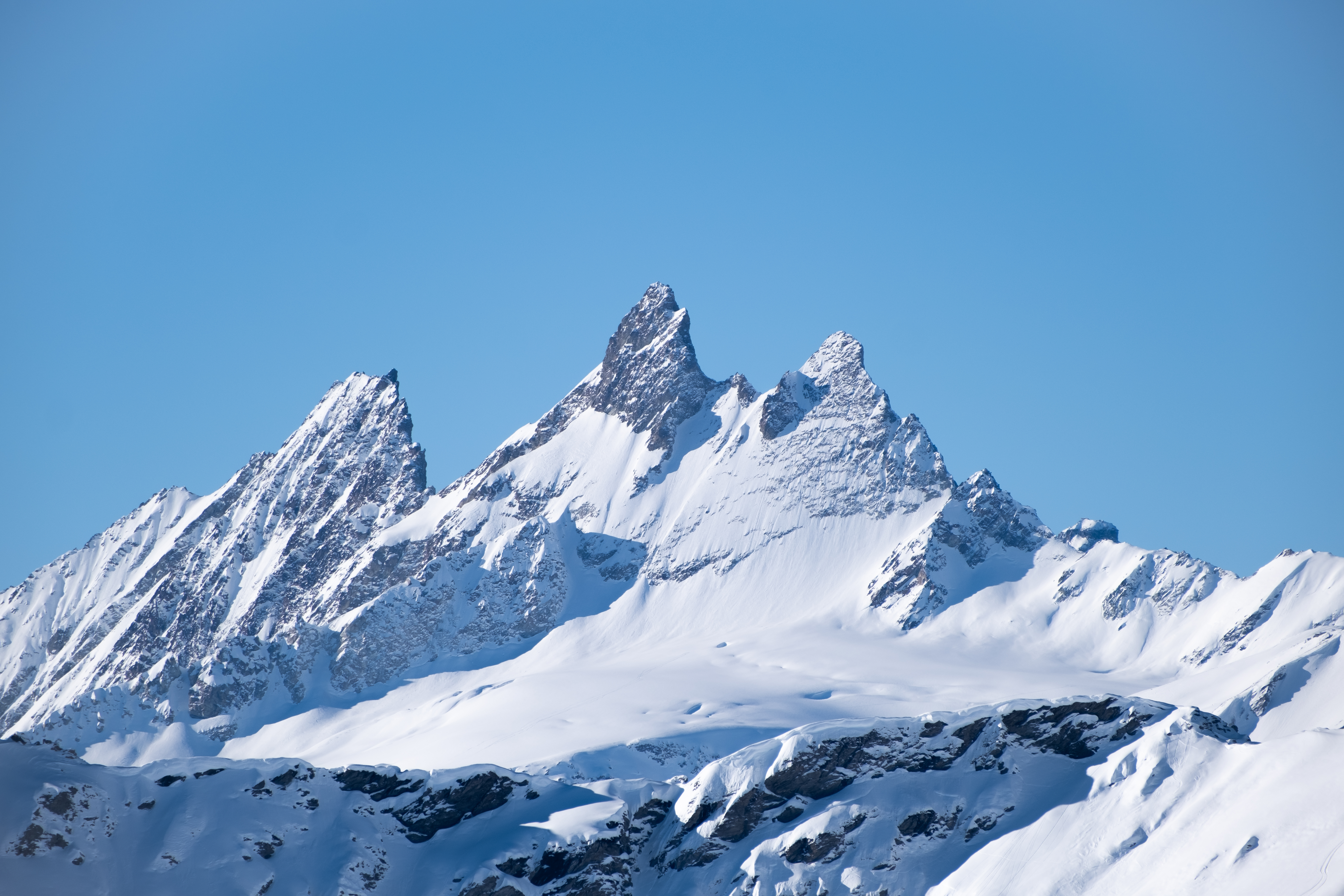

Highest point
- Elevation: 3,646 m (11,962 ft)
- Prominence: 791 m (2,595 ft)
- Parent peak: Monte Rosa
- Listing: Alpine mountains above 3000 m
- Coordinates: 46°03′19″N 7°26′02″E

Geography
- Location within Switzerland
- Location: Valais, Switzerland
- Parent range: Pennine Alps

Climbing
- First ascent: 23 June 1870, by Joseph Gillioz and J.H. Isler

The Aiguilles Rouges d'Arolla are a multi-summited mountain of the Swiss Pennine Alps, located west of Arolla in the canton of Valais. The main summit has an elevation of 3,646 metres above sea level.

== See also ==
- List of mountains of Switzerland
