= Gross Seehorn =

Mountain in Switzerland

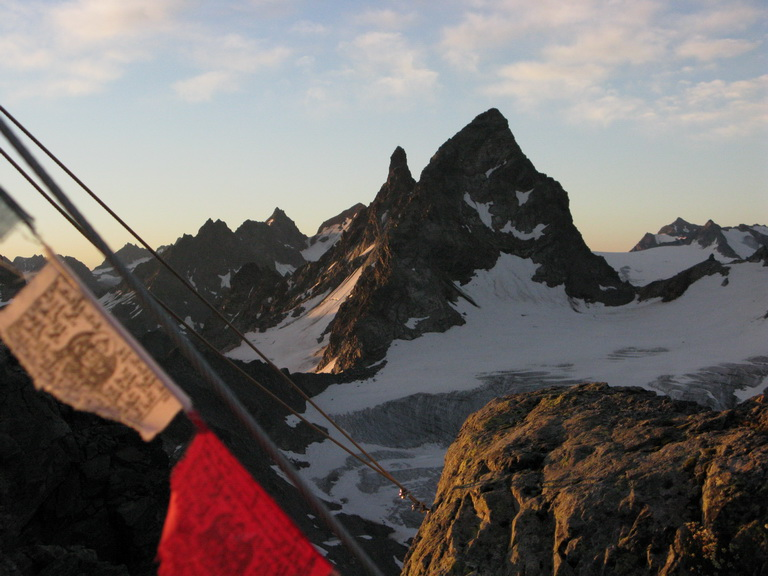
- Gross Seehorn with the tower of the Gross Litzner behind it seen from the West from the summit of the Westlichen Plattenspitze

Highest point
- Elevation: 3,122 m (10,243 ft)
- Prominence: 434 m (1,424 ft)
- Parent peak: Piz Linard
- Listing: Alpine mountains above 3000 m
- Coordinates: 46°53′17.5″N 10°01′55.7″E

Geography
- Location within Alps
- Location: Vorarlberg, Austria; Graubünden, Switzerland
- Parent range: Silvretta Alps

The Gross Seehorn (also spelled Großes Seehorn in German) is a mountain of the Silvretta Alps, located on the border between Austria and Switzerland.

The Gross Seehorn is the westernmost mountain rising above 3,000 metres in Austria.
