= Färichhorn =

Mountain in Switzerland

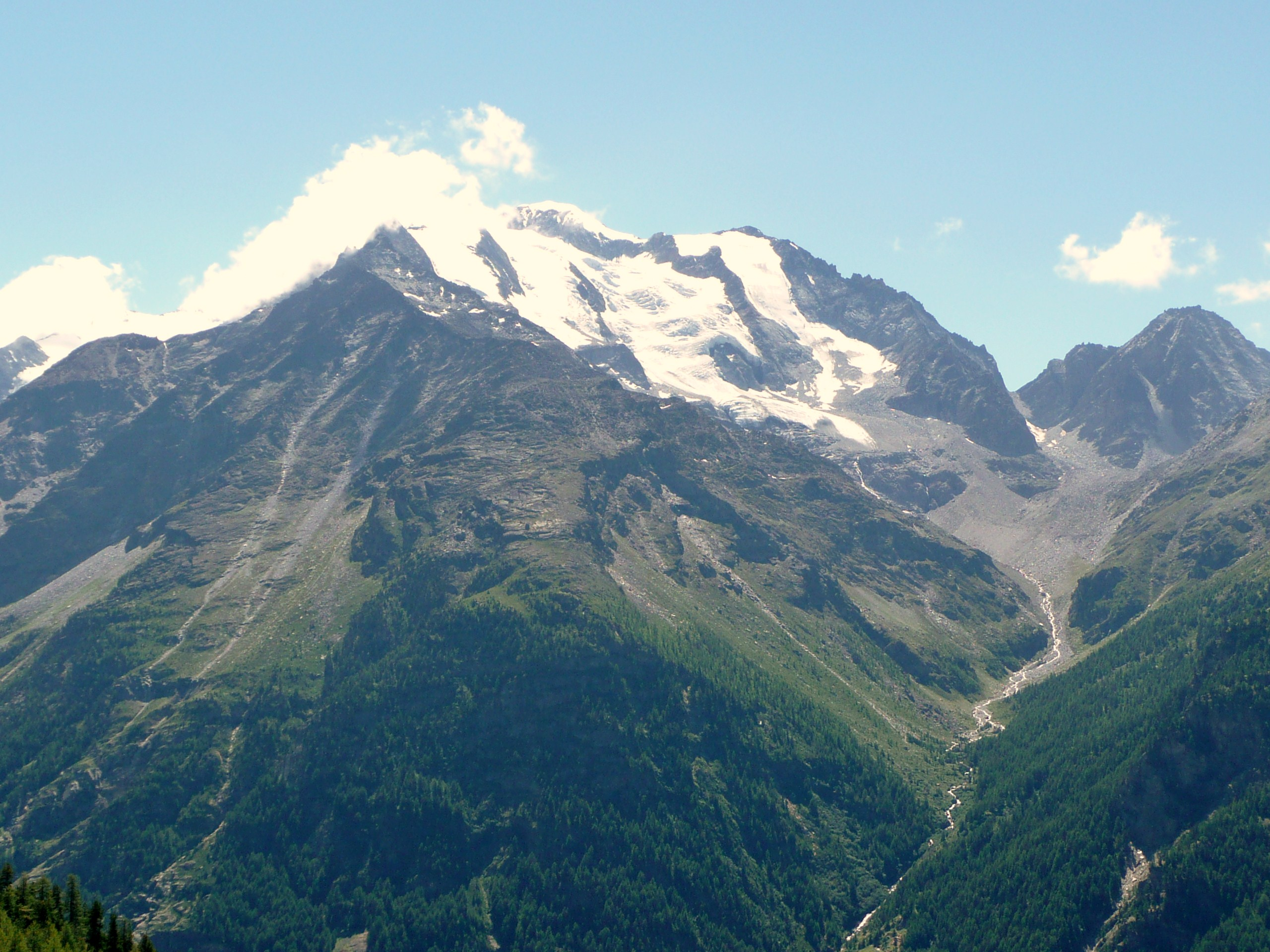
- The Balfrin (centre) and the Färichhorn (right)

Highest point
- Elevation: 3,292 m (10,801 ft)
- Prominence: 248 m (814 ft)
- Parent peak: Monte Rosa
- Coordinates: 46°9′19.9″N 7°51′32.1″E

Geography
- Location within Switzerland
- Location: Valais, Switzerland
- Parent range: Pennine Alps

The Färichhorn is a mountain of the Pennine Alps, located between the Mattertal and the Saastal in the canton of Valais. It lies north of the Balfrin, at a height of 3,292 metres above sea level.
