= Piz Bever =

Mountain in Switzerland

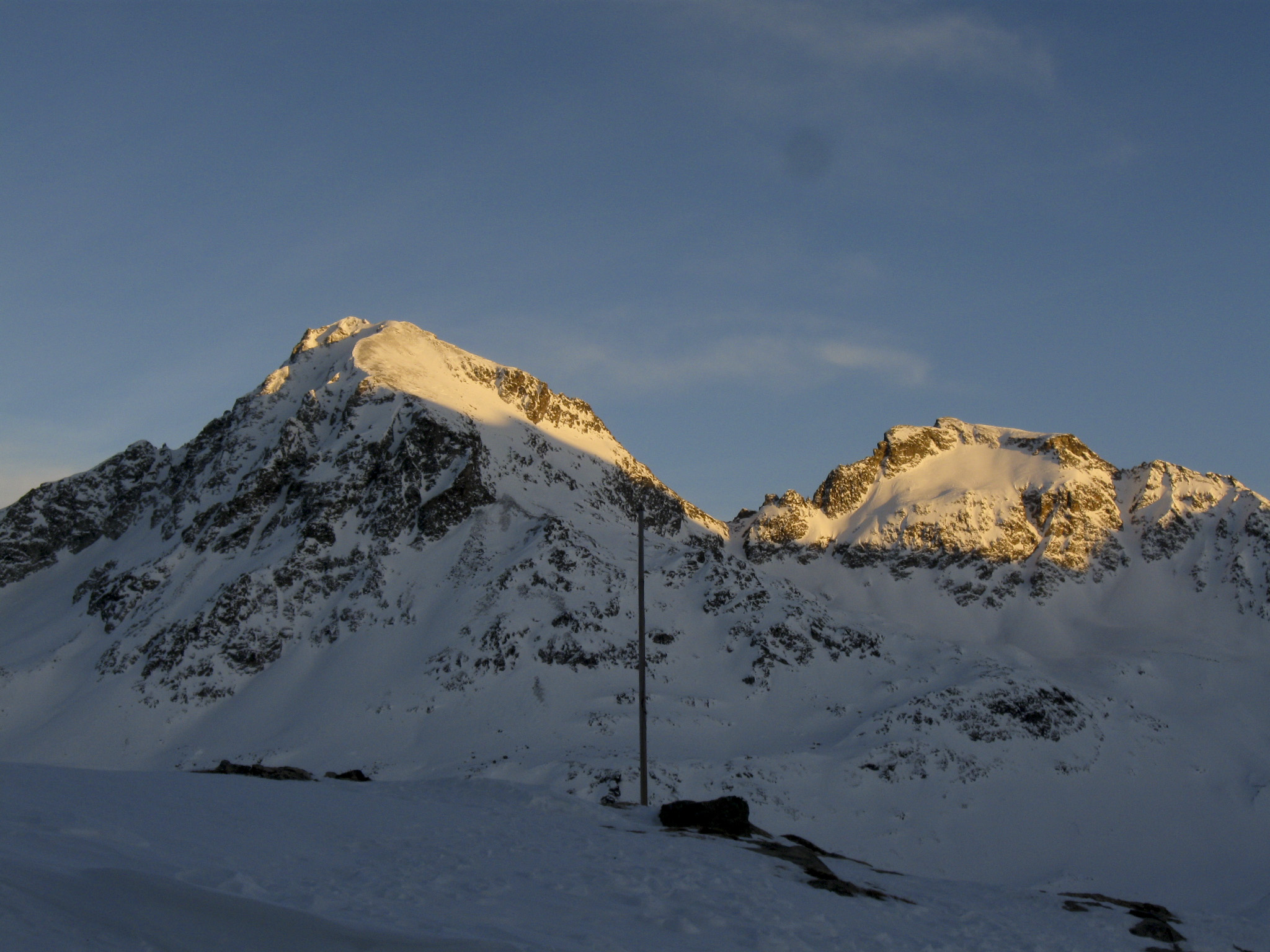
- Piz Bever (left) and Piz Suvretta (right)

Highest point
- Elevation: 3,230 m (10,600 ft)
- Prominence: 283 m (928 ft)
- Parent peak: Piz Calderas
- Coordinates: 46°31′20.1″N 9°45′33.7″E

Geography
- Location within Switzerland
- Location: Graubünden, Switzerland
- Parent range: Albula Range

Piz Bever is a mountain of the Albula Alps, located in the Val Bever, in the canton of Graubünden.
