= Barrhorn =

Mountain in Switzerland

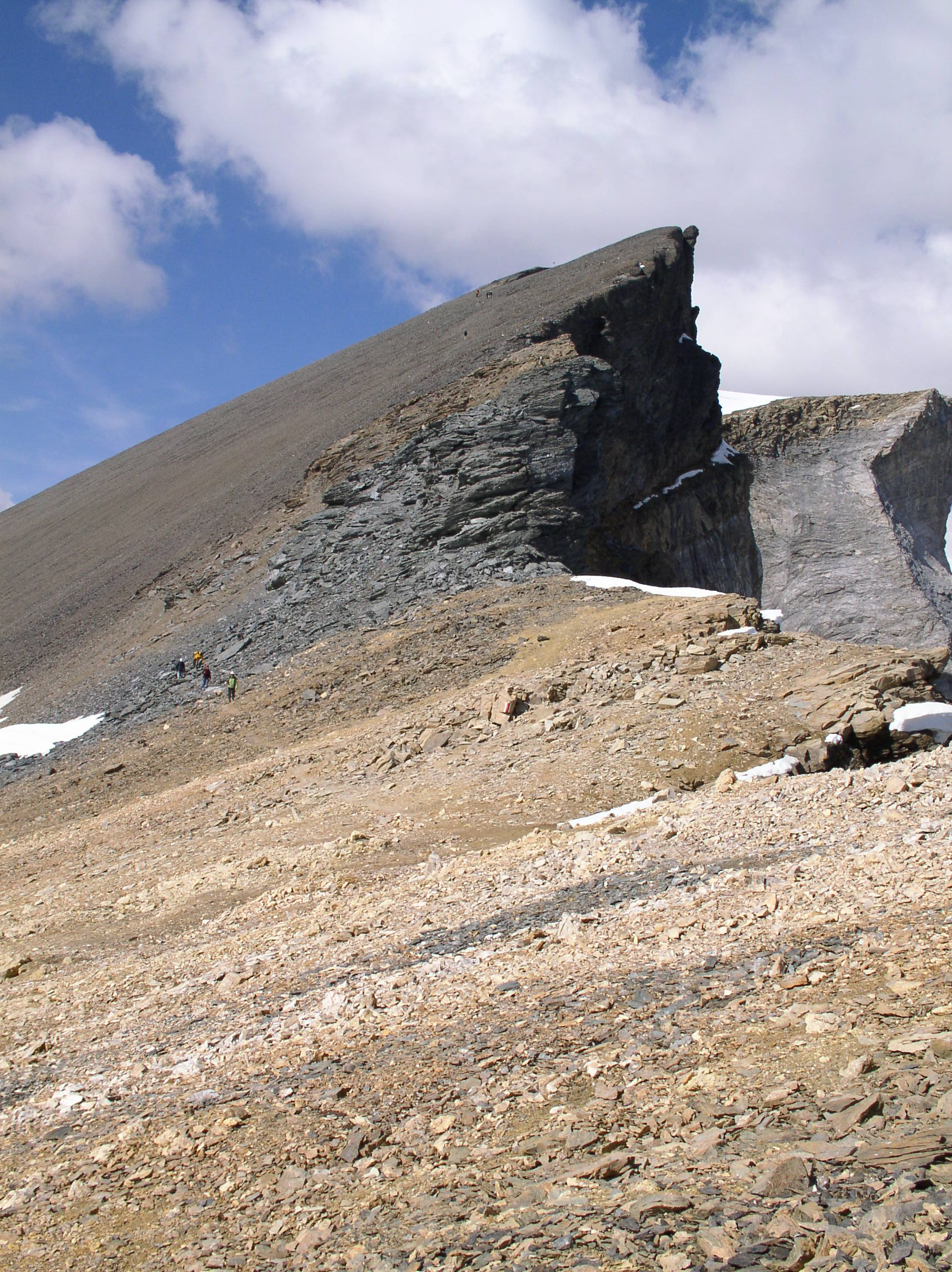

Highest point
- Elevation: 3,610 m (11,840 ft)
- Prominence: 267 m (876 ft)
- Parent peak: Weisshorn
- Coordinates: 46°09′21.1″N 7°44′02.5″E

Geography
- Location within Switzerland Location within Canton of Valais Location within Alps
- Location: Switzerland
- Parent range: Pennine Alps

Climbing
- Easiest route: Hike

The Barrhorn is a mountain in the Pennine Alps.

== Access roads and normal climbing route ==
The only access road is from the north, from the Turtmann village in the Rhône valley. From there, take direction to Gruben, and after passing it drive up to Vorder Sänntum at 1900 m. You will come to the point where the public road ends up, there is a formal parking that costs 4 CHF per day.

The trail from the car parking to the hut takes on average less than 3 hours, and from the Turtmann hut to the summit takes around another 3 hours. No special equipment is required, as it is a simple walk up.
