= List of mountains of Graubünden =

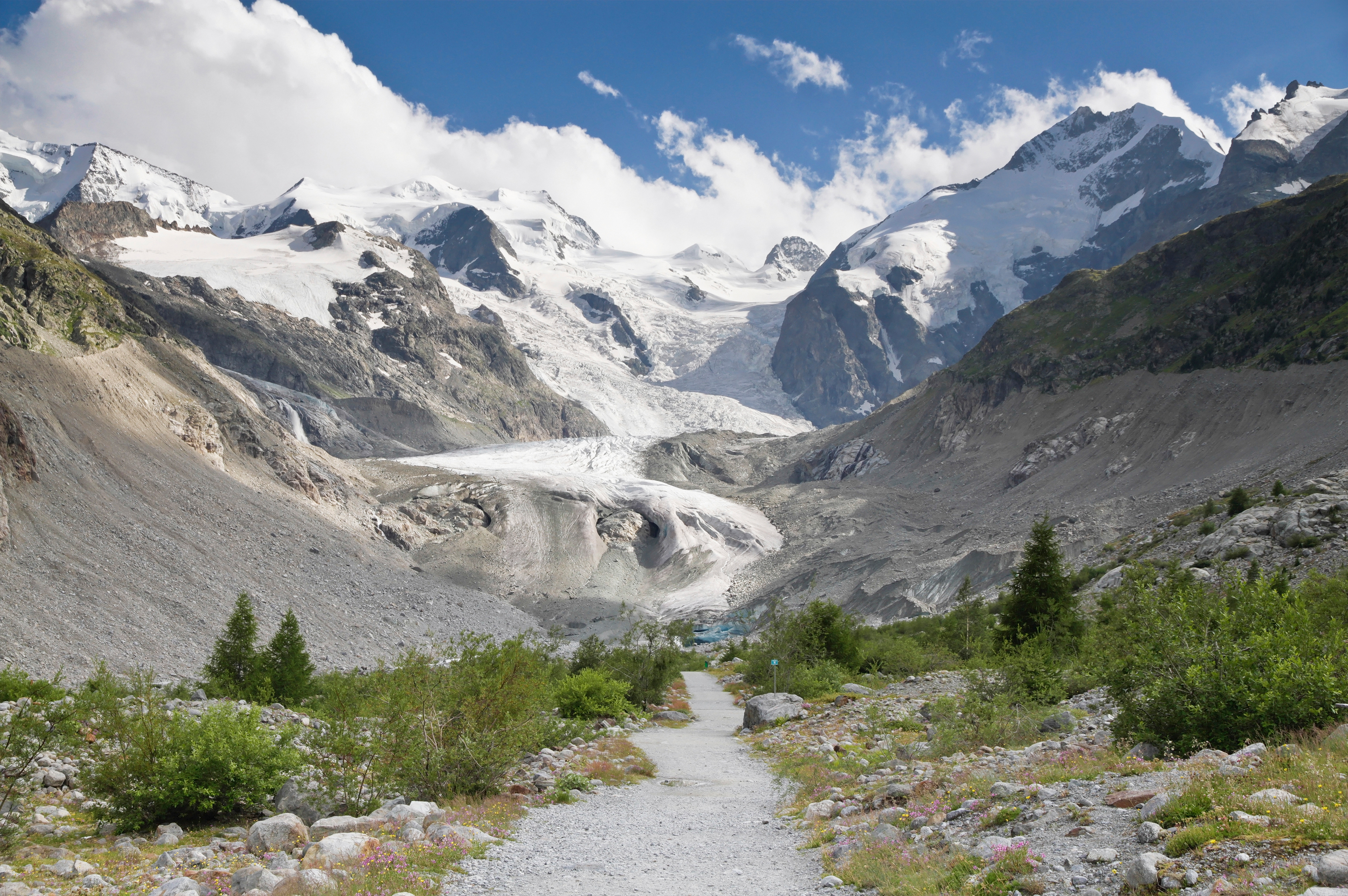
The Bernina Range comprises all the highest mountains of the canton.

This is a list of mountains of the Swiss canton of Graubünden. Graubünden is a very mountainous canton and lies entirely within the Alps. It is also one of the three cantons (with Valais and Bern) having summits over 4,000 metres. Topographically, the most important summit of the canton is that of Piz Bernina (most elevated, most prominent and most isolated). Outside the Bernina Range, the Tödi is both the highest and most prominent summit of the canton.

This list only includes significant summits with a topographic prominence of at least 150 metres (492 ft). There are over 430 such summits in Graubünden and they are found in all its 11 districts. All mountain heights and prominences on the list are from the largest-scale maps available.

== List ==
Mountain	Height (m)	Drop (m)	Coordinates	Range	District(s)	First ascent
Piz Bernina	4048	2236	46°22′56″N 09°54′29″E	Bernina Range	Maloja	1850
Piz Zupò	3995	414	46°22′06″N 09°55′53″E	Bernina Range	Maloja	1863
Piz Roseg	3935	417	46°22′25″N 09°52′59″E	Bernina Range	Maloja	1865
Piz Palü	3899	223	46°22′42″N 09°57′38″E	Bernina Range	Bernina/Maloja	1866
Crast' Agüzza	3870	179	46°22′50″N 09°54′25″E	Bernina Range	Grisons	1865
Piz Morteratsch	3751	324	46°24′10″N 09°54′06″E	Bernina Range	Maloja	1858
Tödi (Piz Russein)	3614	1570	46°48′40″N 08°54′53″E	Glarus Alps	Surselva	1824
Piz Cambrena	3606	158	46°23′16″N 09°58′52″E	Bernina Range	Bernina/Maloja	
Piz Glüschaint	3594	341	46°21′45″N 09°50′24″E	Bernina Range	Maloja	1863
Piz Tschierva	3546	210	46°24′51″N 09°53′10″E	Bernina Range	Maloja	1850
Piz Varuna	3453	222	46°21′08″N 09°59′35″E	Bernina Range	Bernina	
Piz Corvatsch	3451	383	46°24′30″N 09°48′58″E	Bernina Range	Maloja	1850
Piz Tremoggia	3441	349	46°21′07″N 09°49′19″E	Bernina Range	Maloja	1859
Bifertenstock/Piz Durschin	3419	383	46°48′16″N 08°57′27″E	Glarus Alps	Surselva	1863
Piz Kesch/Piz d'Es-Cha	3418	1503	46°37′17″N 09°52′22″E	Albula Alps	Albula/Maloja	1846
Piz Linard	3411	1028	46°47′56″N 10°04′18″E	Silvretta Alps	Inn	1835
Rheinwaldhorn	3402	1337	46°29′37″N 09°02′25″E	Lepontine Alps	Hinterrhein/Surselva	1789
Fluchthorn	3399	647	46°53′27″N 10°13′39″E	Silvretta Alps	Inn	1861
Piz Calderas	3397	1085	46°32′11″N 09°41′45″E	Albula Alps	Albula/Maloja	1857
Piz Platta	3392	1108	46°29′14″N 09°33′42″E	Oberhalbstein Alps	Albula	1866
Il Chapütschin	3386	165	46°22′29″N 09°49′09″E	Bernina Range	Maloja	
Piz Julier/Piz Güglia	3380	489	46°29′28″N 09°45′35″E	Albula Alps	Maloja	1859
Güferhorn	3379	400	46°30′45″N 09°03′47″E	Lepontine Alps	Hinterrhein/Surselva	1806
Cima di Castello	3379	388	46°18′11″N 09°40′37″E	Bregaglia Range	Maloja	1866
Piz d'Err	3378	153	46°32′43″N 09°41′30″E	Albula Alps	Albula	
Pizzo Cengalo	3369	620	46°17′42″N 09°36′07″E	Bregaglia Range	Maloja	1866
Cima di Rosso	3366	266	46°18′23″N 09°43′06″E	Bernina Range	Maloja	
Piz Fora	3363	432	46°20′27″N 09°47′05″E	Bernina Range	Maloja	1875
Piz Ela	3339	515	46°36′07″N 09°42′27″E	Albula Alps	Albula	1865
Piz Picuogl	3333	239	46°31′27″N 09°42′29″E	Albula Alps	Albula	
Oberalpstock/Piz Tgietschen	3328	703	46°44′34″N 08°46′10″E	Glarus Alps	Surselva	1793
Piz Buin	3312	544	46°50′39″N 10°07′07″E	Silvretta Alps	Inn	1865
Piz Badile	3308	262	46°17′41″N 09°35′10″E	Bregaglia Range	Maloja	1867
Piz Paradisin	3302	875	46°25′34″N 10°07′02″E	Livigno Alps	Bernina	
Verstanclahorn	3298	375	46°50′06″N 10°04′21″E	Silvretta Alps	Inn/Prättigau-Davos	1866
Muttler	3293	703	46°54′02″N 10°22′43″E	Samnaun Alps	Inn	1859
Cima della Bondasca	3289	187	46°17′16″N 09°37′18″E	Bregaglia Range	Maloja	
Piz Fliana	3281	406	46°49′38″N 10°06′31″E	Silvretta Alps	Inn	1869
Pizzo Tambo/Tambohorn	3279	1164	46°29′49″N 09°17′00″E	Lepontine Alps	Hinterrhein/Moesa	1828
Piz Üertsch	3267	396	46°35′47″N 09°50′11″E	Albula Alps	Albula/Maloja	1847
Scima da Saoseo	3264	440	46°23′08″N 10°09′29″E	Livigno Alps	Bernina	1894
Piz Languard	3262	947	46°29′18″N 09°57′23″E	Livigno Alps	Maloja	1846
Piz Forbesch	3262	601	46°31′13″N 09°33′33″E	Oberhalbstein Alps	Albula	1893
Gross Düssi/Piz Git	3256	429	46°47′30″N 08°49′39″E	Glarus Alps	Surselva	1841
Piz Buin Pitschen	3256	205	46°50′32″N 10°06′44″E	Silvretta Alps	Inn	
Piz Tschütta/Stammerspitz	3254	406	46°54′13″N 10°20′35″E	Samnaun Alps	Inn	1884
Cavistrau/Brigelser Hörner	3252	448	46°47′04″N 08°58′26″E	Glarus Alps	Surselva	1865
Ringelspitz/Piz Barghis	3247	843	46°53′54″N 09°20′35″E	Glarus Alps	Imboden	1865
Piz Ot	3246	631	46°32′36″N 09°48′37″E	Albula Alps	Maloja	1830
Piz Bacun	3244	306	46°20′32″N 09°40′56″E	Bregaglia Range	Maloja	1883
Silvrettahorn	3244	205	46°51′25″N 10°05′35″E	Silvretta Alps	Prättigau-Davos	1865
Corn da Camp	3232	201	46°25′04″N 10°06′28″E	Livigno Alps	Bernina	
Augstenberg/Piz Blaisch Lunga	3230	432	46°51′52″N 10°12′14″E	Silvretta Alps	Inn	1881
Piz Bever	3230	283	46°31′20″N 09°45′34″E	Albula Alps	Maloja	
Piz Vadret	3229	660	46°41′13″N 09°57′46″E	Albula Alps	Inn/Maloja	1867
Vorderes Plattenhorn (Ostgipfel)	3220	300	46°48′36″N 10°01′59″E	Silvretta Alps	Inn/Prättigau-Davos	1868
Vogelberg	3218	303	46°28′42″N 09°03′55″E	Lepontine Alps	Hinterrhein	1864
Monte del Forno	3214	446	46°20′18″N 09°43′29″E	Bregaglia Range	Maloja	1876
Piz Medel	3211	952	46°37′06″N 08°54′40″E	Lepontine Alps	Surselva	1865
Piz Timun /Pizzo d'Emet	3209	823	46°28′01″N 09°24′34″E	Oberhalbstein Alps	Hinterrhein	1884
Piz Cambrialas	3208	364	46°47′22″N 08°51′07″E	Glarus Alps	Surselva	1905
Munt Pers	3207	242	46°25′17″N 09°57′13″E	Bernina Range	Maloja	
Piz Sesvenna	3204	1055	46°42′21″N 10°24′10″E	Sesvenna Range	Inn	
Piz Arblatsch	3203	235	46°32′08″N 09°34′37″E	Oberhalbstein Alps	Albula	
Puntone dei Fraciòn	3202	157	46°28′16″N 09°05′07″E	Lepontine Alps	Moesa	
Piz Blaisun	3200	235	46°36′11″N 09°51′46″E	Albula Alps	Albula/Maloja	
Piz Vadret	3199	308	46°30′32″N 09°57′03″E	Livigno Alps	Maloja	
Dreiländerspitze	3197	306	46°51′03″N 10°08′41″E	Silvretta Alps	Inn	1853
Piz Surgonda	3196	210	46°30′36″N 09°43′30″E	Albula Alps	Albula/Maloja	
Scopi	3190	792	46°34′18″N 08°49′48″E	Lepontine Alps	Surselva	1782
Piz Fedoz	3190	207	46°21′35″N 09°44′26″E	Bernina Range	Maloja	
Piz Surlej	3188	433	46°27′12″N 09°50′35″E	Bernina Range	Maloja	1846
Krone	3187	243	46°52′33″N 10°13′55″E	Silvretta Alps	Inn	
Piz Murtaröl	3180	679	46°34′13″N 10°17′15″E	Ortler Alps	Inn	1893
Piz Tasna	3179	371	46°51′33″N 10°15′08″E	Silvretta Alps	Inn	1849
Piz Sarsura	3178	164	46°41′30″N 09°59′41″E	Albula Alps	Inn	
Piz Pisoc	3173	922	46°44′40″N 10°16′46″E	Sesvenna Range	Inn	1865
Corn da Tinizong /Tinzenhorn	3173	474	46°36′42″N 09°40′16″E	Albula Alps	Albula	1866
Piz Tavrü	3168	851	46°40′45″N 10°17′46″E	Sesvenna Range	Inn	1893
Piz Vial	3168	465	46°37′55″N 08°58′09″E	Lepontine Alps	Surselva	1873
Piz Plavna Dadaint	3167	490	46°42′31″N 10°13′25″E	Sesvenna Range	Inn	1891
Piz Albris	3166	318	46°27′51″N 09°57′48″E	Livigno Alps	Maloja	
Piz Lagrev	3165	855	46°26′45″N 09°43′22″E	Albula Alps	Albula/Maloja	1875
Piz Quattervals	3165	471	46°37′38″N 10°05′42″E	Livigno Alps	Inn	1848
Cima Rossa	3161	236	46°26′38″N 09°05′13″E	Lepontine Alps	Moesa	
Piz Mitgel	3159	445	46°36′51″N 09°38′48″E	Albula Alps	Albula	1867
Hausstock	3158	655	46°52′28″N 09°03′56″E	Glarus Alps	Surselva	1832
Piz Prüna	3153	317	46°29′14″N 09°59′14″E	Livigno Alps	Maloja	
Piz Terri	3149	390	46°36′00″N 09°02′03″E	Lepontine Alps	Surselva	1802
Flüela Schwarzhorn	3146	609	46°44′09″N 09°56′30″E	Albula Alps	Inn/Prättigau-Davos	1835
Piz Mundin	3146	342	46°55′31″N 10°25′51″E	Samnaun Alps	Inn	1849
Piz Tea Fondada/Monte Cornaccia	3144	319	46°32′58″N 10°18′29″E	Ortler Alps	Inn	1883
Piz Duan	3131	482	46°22′31″N 09°35′00″E	Oberhalbstein Alps	Maloja	1859
Piz Schumbraida	3125	315	46°32′34″N 10°20′18″E	Ortler Alps	Inn	1883
Fanellhorn	3124	301	46°32′52″N 09°07′50″E	Lepontine Alps	Surselva	1859
Piz Nuna	3123	535	46°43′24″N 10°09′16″E	Sesvenna Range	Inn	1886
Gross Seehorn	3122	434	46°53′16″N 10°01′57″E	Silvretta Alps	Prättigau-Davos	1869
Piz Aul	3121	395	46°37′22″N 09°07′30″E	Lepontine Alps	Surselva	1801
Piz da l'Acqua	3118	310	46°36′40″N 10°08′20″E	Livigno Alps	Inn	1888
Gletscherhorn (Note: The lowest col between equally high Gletscherhorn and Piz Gallagiun is the 383 m deep Passo de la Prasgnola. They share the 2694 m key col Pass da la Duana.)	3107	413	46°23′15″N 09°33′38″E	Oberhalbstein Alps	Hinterrhein/Maloja	1849
Pizz Gallagiun/Galleggione	3107	413	46°22′01″N 09°29′16″E	Oberhalbstein Alps	Maloja	1861
Piz la Stretta / Monte Breva	3104	314	46°28′36″N 10°02′41″E	Livigno Alps	Maloja	
Piz Segnas	3099	607	46°54′28″N 09°14′23″E	Glarus Alps	Imboden	1861
Piz Giuv/Schattig Wichel	3096	749	46°42′07″N 08°41′33″E	Glarus Alps	Surselva	1804
Flüela Wisshorn	3085	632	46°45′44″N 09°58′00″E	Silvretta Alps	Inn/Prättigau-Davos	1880
Cima da Lägh/Cima di Lago	3083	422	46°22′35″N 09°27′40″E	Oberhalbstein Alps	Maloja	
Chüealphorn	3078	472	46°41′07″N 09°54′19″E	Albula Alps	Maloja/Prättigau-Davos	1877
Piz Starlex	3075	779	46°39′46″N 10°23′33″E	Sesvenna Range	Inn	
Piz Sena	3075	344	46°21′11″N 10°06′36″E	Livigno Alps	Bernina	1901
Hoch Ducan	3063	324	46°41′22″N 09°51′05″E	Albula Alps	Albula/Prättigau-Davos	1845
Cima dei Cogn	3063	177	46°25′56″N 09°05′19″E	Lepontine Alps	Moesa	
Piz Grisch	3060	544	46°31′52″N 09°28′22″E	Oberhalbstein Alps	Hinterrhein	1861
Piz Nair	3057	184	46°30′23″N 09°47′15″E	Albula Alps	Maloja	
Bruschghorn	3056	577	46°37′52″N 09°18′24″E	Lepontine Alps	Hinterrhein/Surselva	
Piz Forun	3052	458	46°39′19″N 09°51′54″E	Albula Alps	Albula/Maloja	1847
Piz Minor	3049	584	46°27′04″N 10°01′42″E	Livigno Alps	Maloja	
Piz Murtera	3044	449	46°46′31″N 10°02′26″E	Silvretta Alps	Inn	
Piz Gannaretsch	3040	934	46°36′43″N 08°47′12″E	Lepontine Alps	Surselva	
Alperschällihorn	3039	425	46°35′12″N 09°18′23″E	Lepontine Alps	Hinterrhein/Surselva	1893
Piz S-chalembert	3031	722	46°48′03″N 10°24′48″E	Sesvenna Range	Inn	
Piz Por	3028	733	46°30′34″N 09°23′03″E	Oberhalbstein Alps	Hinterrhein	1894
Bündner Vorab	3028	408	46°52′26″N 09°09′24″E	Glarus Alps	Surselva	1842
Piz Dolf	3028	250	46°54′12″N 09°16′00″E	Glarus Alps	Imboden	
Surettahorn	3027	156	46°30′35″N 09°21′45″E	Lepontine Alps	Hinterrhein	
Piz Corbet	3025	672	46°22′47″N 09°16′49″E	Lepontine Alps	Moesa	1892
Piz Blas	3019	312	46°34′38″N 08°43′41″E	Lepontine Alps	Surselva	1871
Piz Rondadura	3016	266	46°34′35″N 08°45′02″E	Lepontine Alps	Surselva	
Witenalpstock	3016	266	46°44′10″N 08°44′51″E	Glarus Alps	Surselva	
Paraid Naira	3015	328	46°55′54″N 10°14′31″E	Silvretta Alps	Inn	1853
Piz Polaschin	3013	215	46°27′39″N 09°45′10″E	Albula Alps	Maloja	
Piz Ravetsch	3007	292	46°35′03″N 08°42′11″E	Lepontine Alps	Surselva	
Älplihorn	3006	426	46°42′39″N 09°49′33″E	Albula Alps	Prättigau-Davos	
Höhberghorn	3005	166	46°30′35″N 09°06′11″E	Lepontine Alps	Hinterrhein/Surselva	
Piz Costainas	3004	199	46°33′46″N 10°28′25″E	Ortler Alps	Inn	
Pizzas d'Anarosa/Grauhörner	3002	366	46°35′56″N 09°18′57″E	Lepontine Alps	Hinterrhein	1894
Piz Beverin	2998	396	46°39′09″N 09°21′28″E	Lepontine Alps	Hinterrhein	1707
Piz de la Lumbreida	2983	564	46°28′52″N 09°13′31″E	Lepontine Alps	Moesa	
Aroser Rothorn	2980	1349	46°44′16″N 09°36′50″E	Plessur Alps	Albula/Plessur	
Piz Curvér	2972	456	46°36′12″N 09°29′50″E	Oberhalbstein Alps	Albula/Hinterrhein	1843
Piz Daint	2968	734	46°37′07″N 10°17′27″E	Ortler Alps	Inn	
Schesaplana	2965	828	47°03′13″N 09°42′27″E	Rätikon	Prättigau-Davos	1610
Piz Turettas	2963	400	46°35′13″N 10°20′05″E	Ortler Alps	Inn	
Piz Lagalb	2959	524	46°25′54″N 10°01′25″E	Livigno Alps	Maloja	
Piz Miez	2956	445	46°39′17″N 08°55′00″E	Lepontine Alps	Surselva	
Torent / Torrone Alto	2952	835	46°20′37″N 09°04′16″E	Lepontine Alps	Moesa	1882
Crasta Mora	2952	486	46°34′17″N 09°52′05″E	Albula Alps	Maloja	
Piz Tomül/Wissensteinhorn	2946	534	46°37′24″N 09°13′42″E	Lepontine Alps	Surselva	1807
Piz Cavel	2946	518	46°39′21″N 09°01′11″E	Lepontine Alps	Surselva	
Einshorn	2944	571	46°30′58″N 09°13′49″E	Lepontine Alps	Hinterrhein/Moesa	
Pizzo del Ramulazz S	2939	324	46°23′48″N 09°05′34″E	Lepontine Alps	Moesa	
Bärenhorn	2929	449	46°34′32″N 09°13′55″E	Lepontine Alps	Hinterrhein/Surselva	
Flimspitz	2929	172	46°58′56″N 10°20′38″E	Samnaun Alps		
Rosställispitz	2929	368	46°47′21″N 09°59′37″E	Silvretta Alps	Inn/Prättigau-Davos	
Badus/Six Madun	2928	529	46°37′21″N 08°39′49″E	Lepontine Alps	Surselva	1785
Piz Combul	2901	313	46°13′47″N 10°02′38″E	Bernina Range	Bernina	
Schwarzhorn/Piz Gren	2890	355	46°40′39″N 09°01′22″E	Lepontine Alps	Surselva	
Schildflue	2887	333	46°52′50″N 09°57′23″E	Silvretta Alps	Prättigau-Davos	
Guggernüll	2886	377	46°31′26″N 09°16′17″E	Lepontine Alps	Hinterrhein/Moesa	
Piz Fess	2880	501	46°43′39″N 09°17′19″E	Lepontine Alps	Surselva	1895
Eisentälispitze	2875	386	46°54′48″N 09°57′45″E	Silvretta Alps	Prättigau-Davos	1892
Cima de Barna	2862	314	46°25′14″N 09°15′49″E	Lepontine Alps	Moesa	
Piz di Sassiglion	2855	313	46°19′22″N 10°06′45″E	Livigno Alps	Bernina	
Weissfluh	2843	497	46°50′06″N 09°47′43″E	Plessur Alps	Plessur	
Madrisahorn	2826	600	46°55′52″N 09°52′20″E	Rätikon	Prättigau-Davos	
Sulzfluh	2818	475	47°00′45″N 09°50′23″E	Rätikon	Prättigau-Davos	1782
Haldensteiner Calanda	2805	1460	46°54′00″N 09°28′03″E	Glarus Alps	Landquart	1559
Cima de Gagela	2805	723	46°23′03″N 09°10′29″E	Lepontine Alps	Moesa	
Tiejer Flue	2781	345	46°46′51″N 09°44′04″E	Plessur Alps	Plessur/Prättigau-Davos	
Schwarzberg/Piz Nair	2764	343	46°36′34″N 08°40′40″E	Lepontine Alps	Surselva	
Pizzo di Claro	2727	361	46°17′45″N 09°03′20″E	Lepontine Alps	Moesa	
Piz de Groven	2694	433	46°19′06″N 09°09′33″E	Lepontine Alps	Moesa	
Piz Pian Grand	2689	528	46°25′03″N 09°09′20″E	Lepontine Alps	Moesa	
Cima del Serraglio	2685	350	46°35′34″N 10°14′32″E	Ortler Alps	Inn	
Piz della Forcola	2675	449	46°18′59″N 09°17′36″E	Lepontine Alps	Moesa	
Piz Toissa	2657	310	46°37′07″N 09°31′30″E	Oberhalbstein Alps	Albula	
Munt Buffalora	2630	351	46°37′37″N 10°15′00″E	Ortler Alps	Inn	
Piz Cavradi	2614	351	46°37′57″N 08°41′44″E	Lepontine Alps	Surselva	
Vorder Grauspitz	2599	353	47°03′10″N 09°34′52″E	Rätikon	Landquart	
Pizzo Paglia	2593	498	46°13′54″N 09°13′09″E	Lepontine Alps	Moesa	
Stätzerhorn	2575	1028	46°45′21″N 09°30′44″E	Plessur Alps	Hinterrhein/Plessur	
Kirchlispitzen	2552	313	47°02′20″N 09°46′10″E	Rätikon	Prättigau-Davos	1891
Hochwang	2534	417	46°52′27″N 09°37′59″E	Plessur Alps	Landquart/Plessur/Prättigau-Davos	
Vilan	2376	416	47°00′46″N 09°36′11″E	Rätikon	Landquart/Prättigau-Davos	
Pizzo di Campel	2376	332	46°19′55″N 09°15′42″E	Lepontine Alps	Moesa	
Marmontana	2316	343	46°10′19″N 09°10′13″E	Lugano Prealps	Moesa	
Chrüz	2196	589	46°57′18″N 09°46′30″E	Rätikon	Prättigau-Davos	
Fläscherberg (Regitzer Spitz)	1135	422	47°02′15″N 09°30′23″E	Rätikon	Landquart	

== See also ==
- List of mountains of Switzerland
- Swiss Alps
