= Safien Valley =

Valley in Switzerland

Coordinates: 46°41′48″N 9°19′28″E

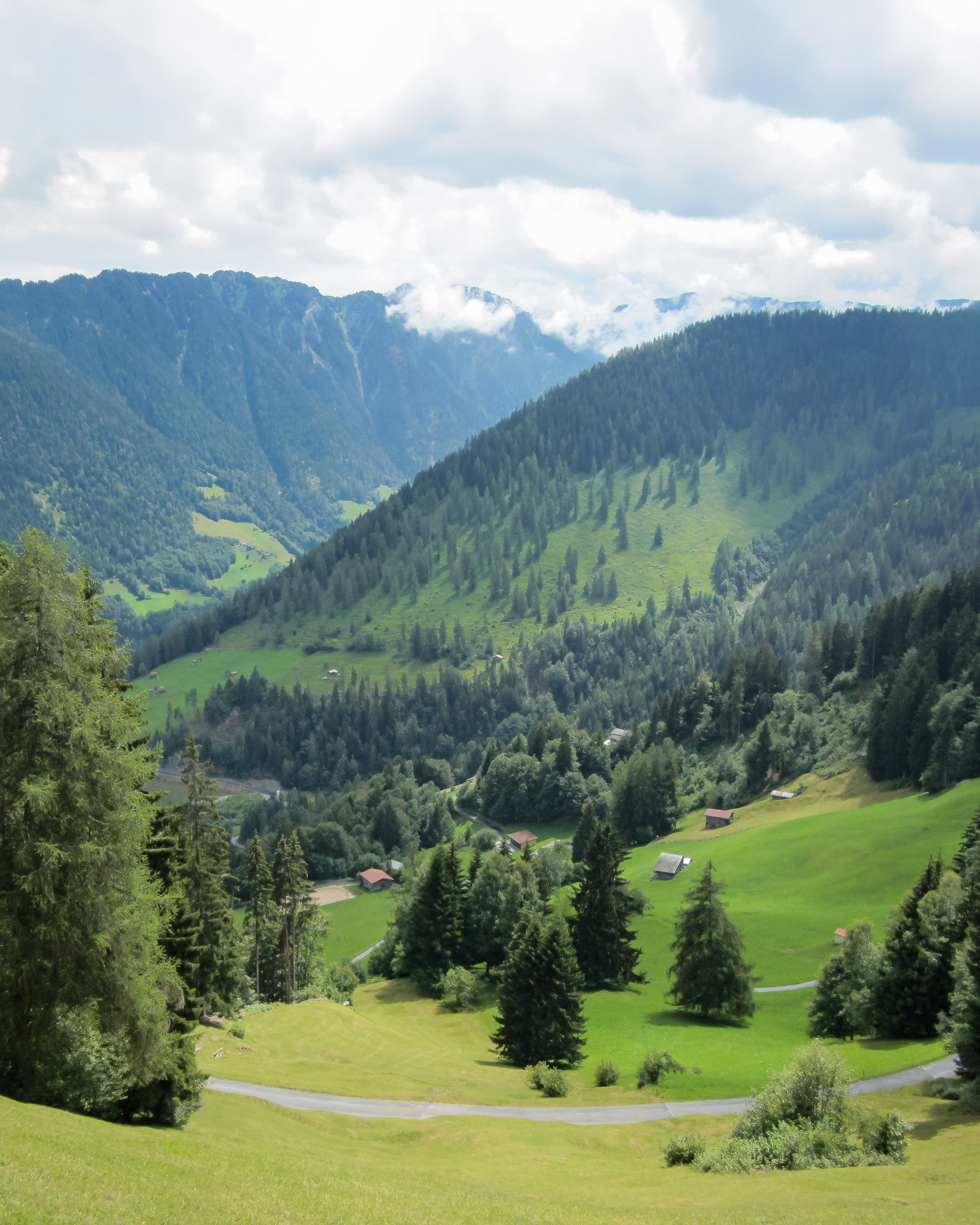
Safien Valley as seen from Versam

The Safien Valley (Safiental) is an alpine valley of the Canton of Graubünden, Switzerland, branching off the Vorderrhein valley. Part of the Surselva district, it comprises the municipality of Safiental, which was created from the four former municipalities of Valendas, Versam, Tenna and Safien on 1 January 2013. The valley was settled by German speaking Walser people in the late 13th century, and today has a population of just above 1,000.

== History ==
Historically economically used by Romansh speakers without settlements, the inner part of the valley was settled by German speaking Walser people in the late 13th century. Population fell from 1,798 in 1850 to 994 in 1980 and has since stabilized just above 1,000.

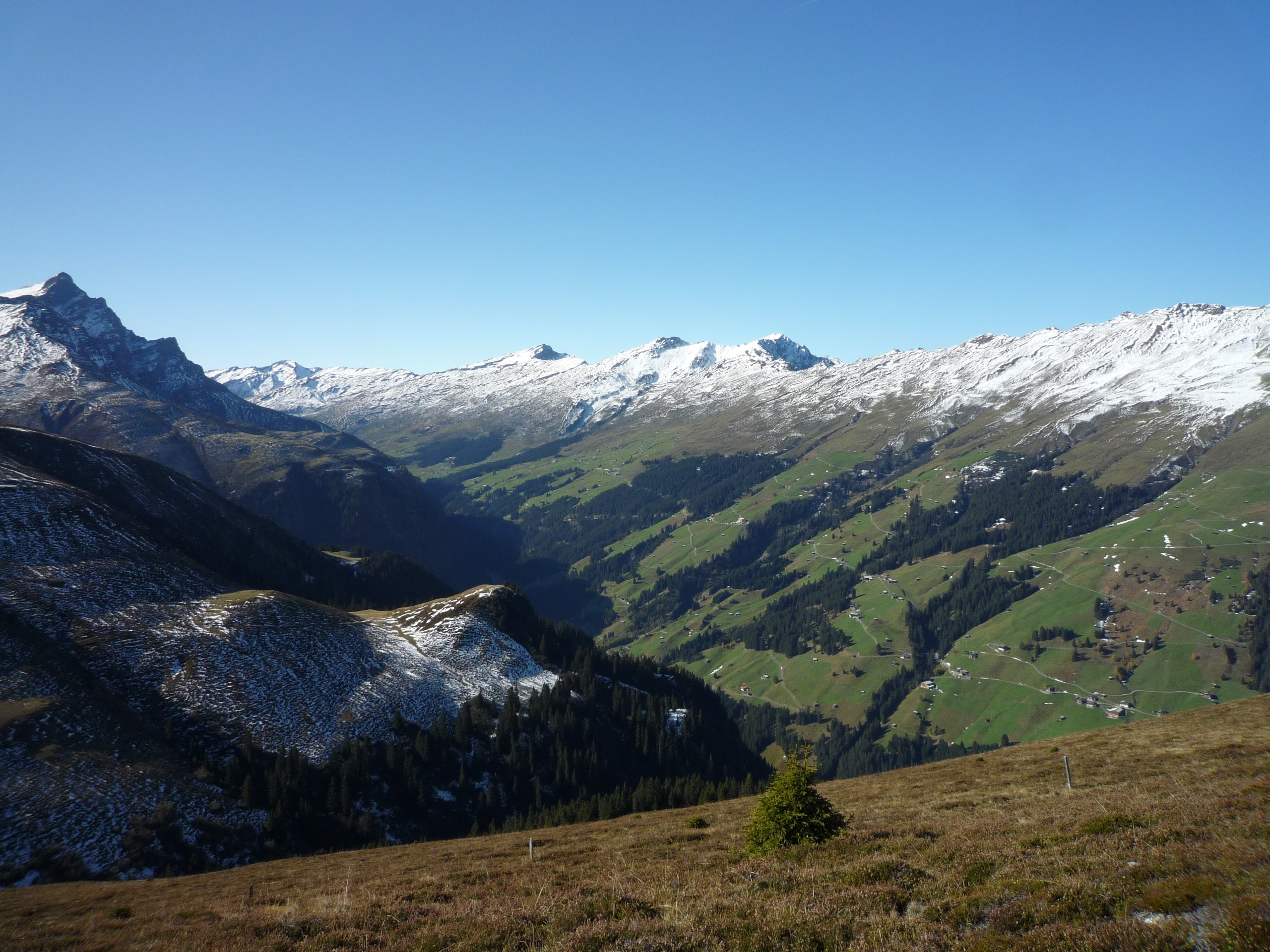
Inner part of Safiental, view upvalley to southwest (1949 vs 2011)

Every two years Art Safiental takes place, inviting artists to participate to a theme.

== Geology ==
From the Ruinaulta gorge formed by the Rhine at about 620 Meters above the Sea, the public road into the valley ends after some 22 kilometers at a Level of 1720 meters. The mountains on the much steeper eastern flank of the valley reach roughly 3000 Meters (Bruschghorn, Piz Beverin). The western side of the valley is less steep but reaches 2900 meters at Piz Tomül in the southwestern part and Piz Fess in its northern pert as well.

== Gallery ==
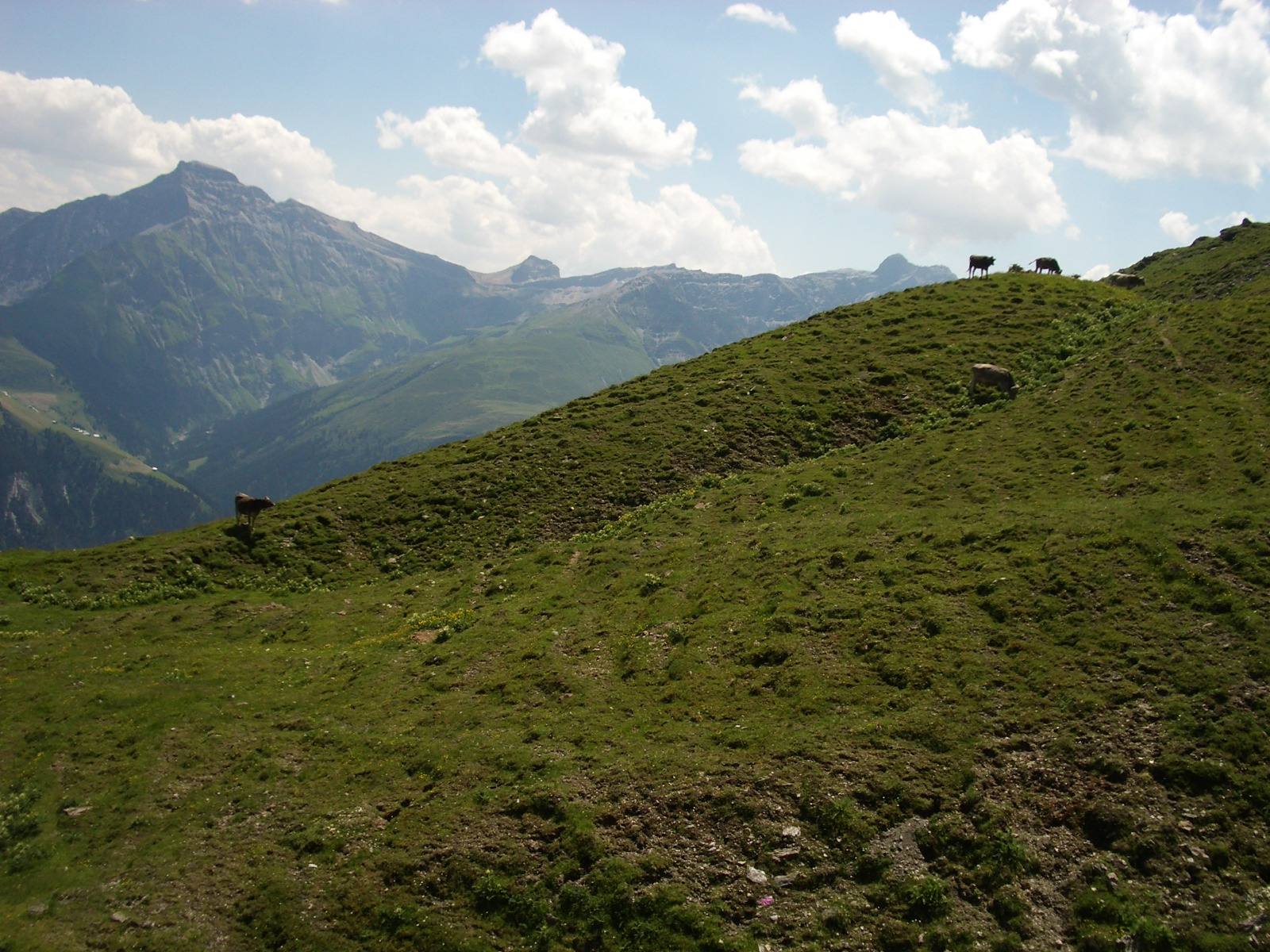
View to Glaspass and Piz Beverin

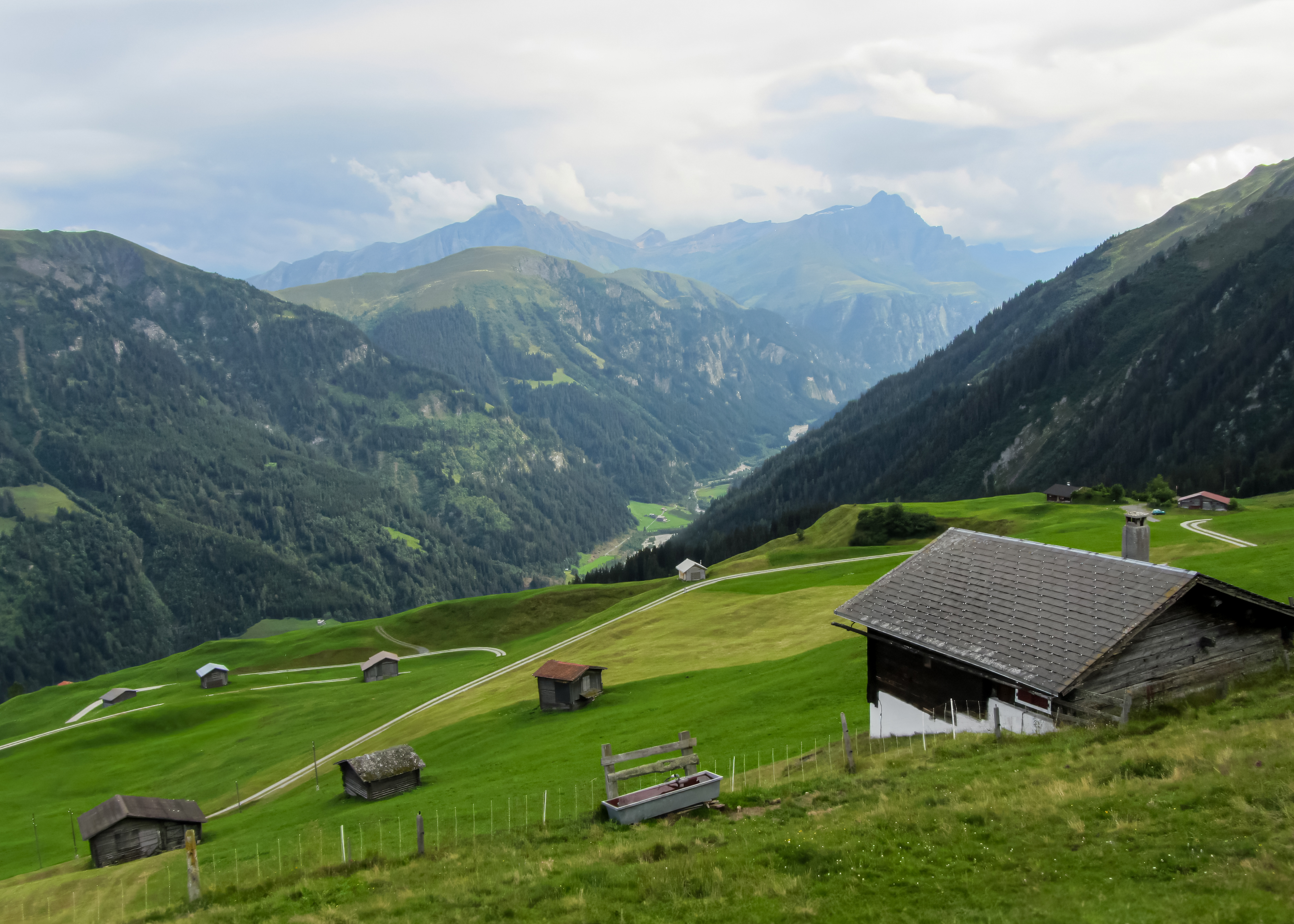
Safien Valley as seen from Tenna

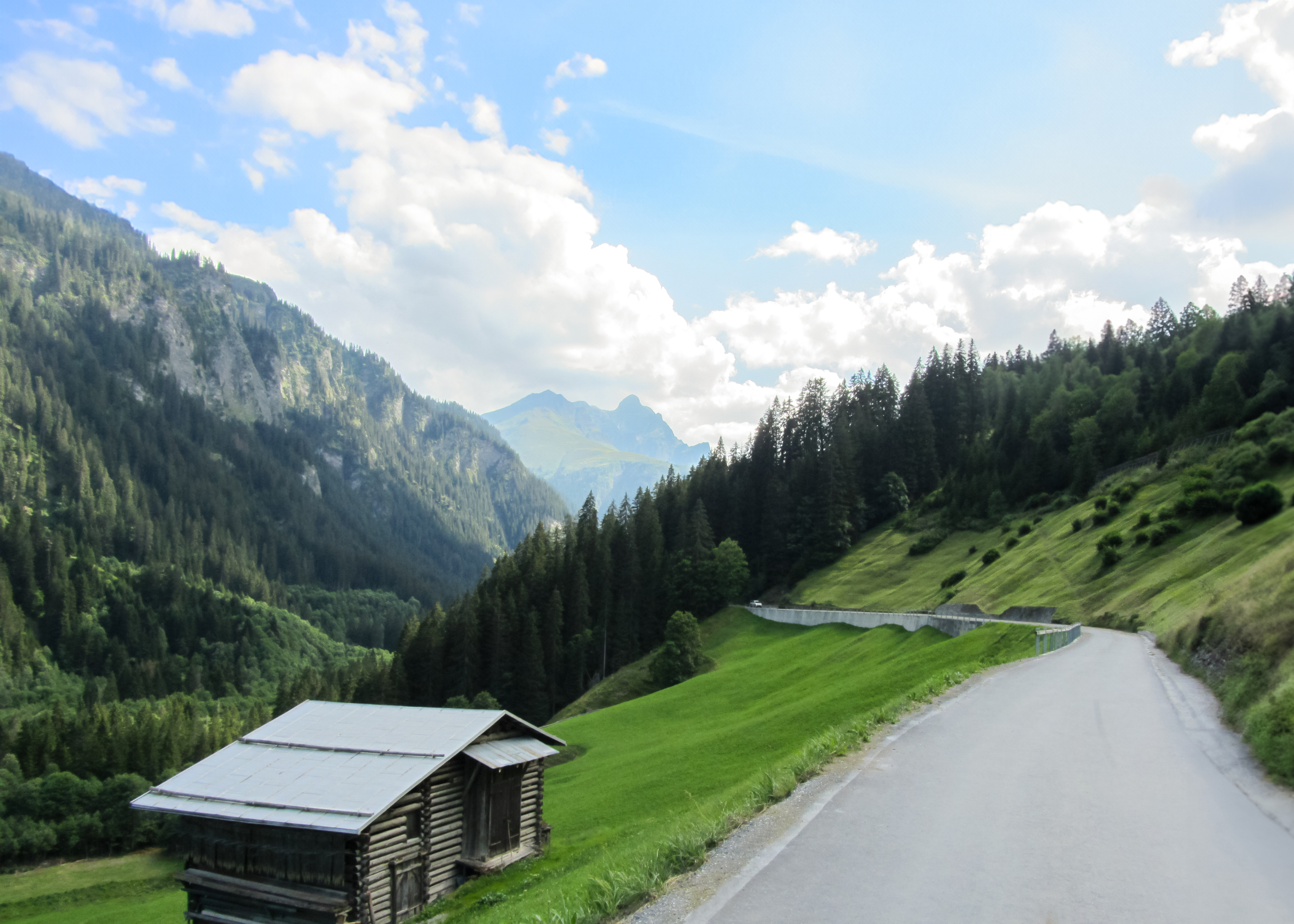
Safien Valley as seen from Safien

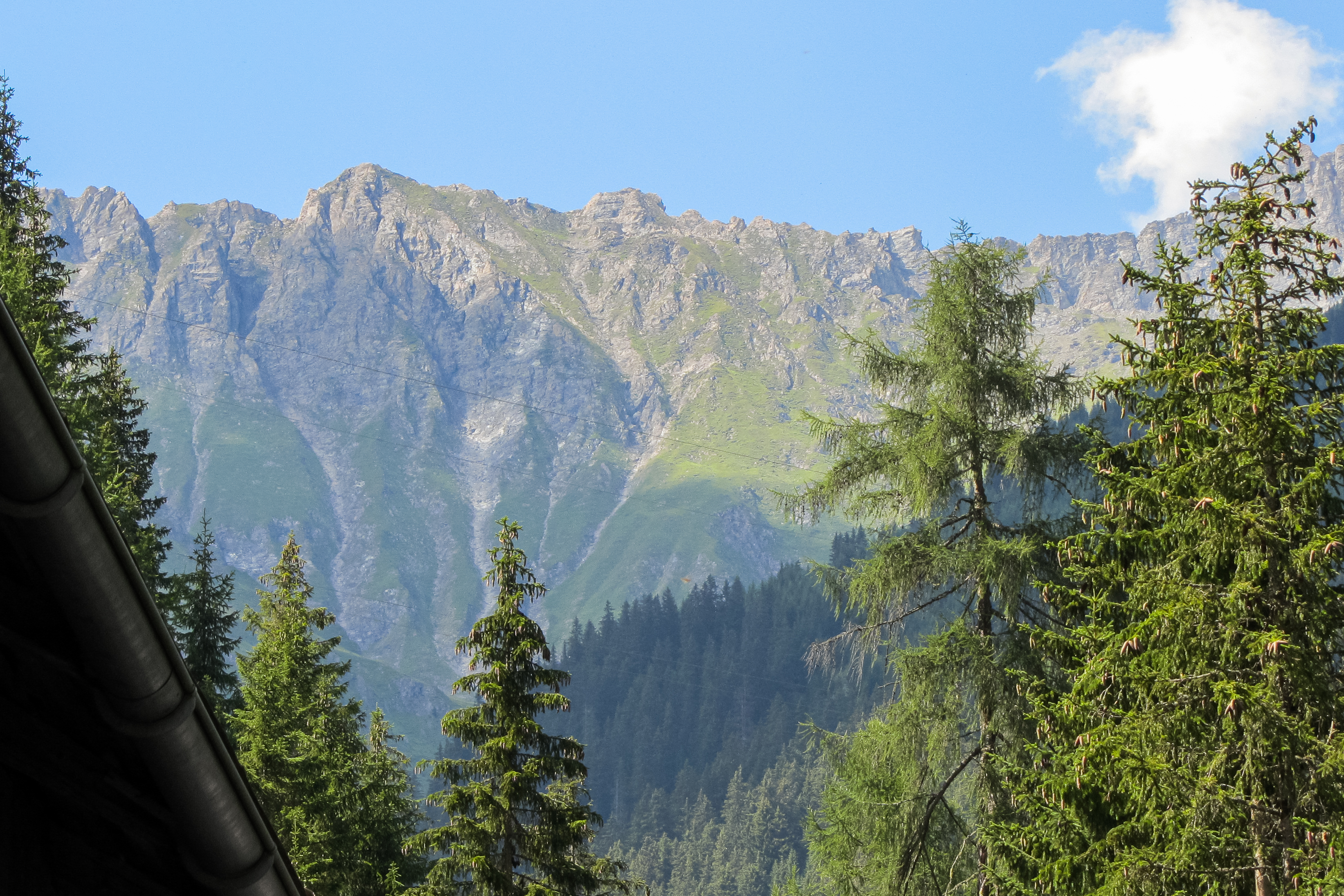
Mountains in Safien Valley
