= Piz Gren =

Mountain in Switzerland

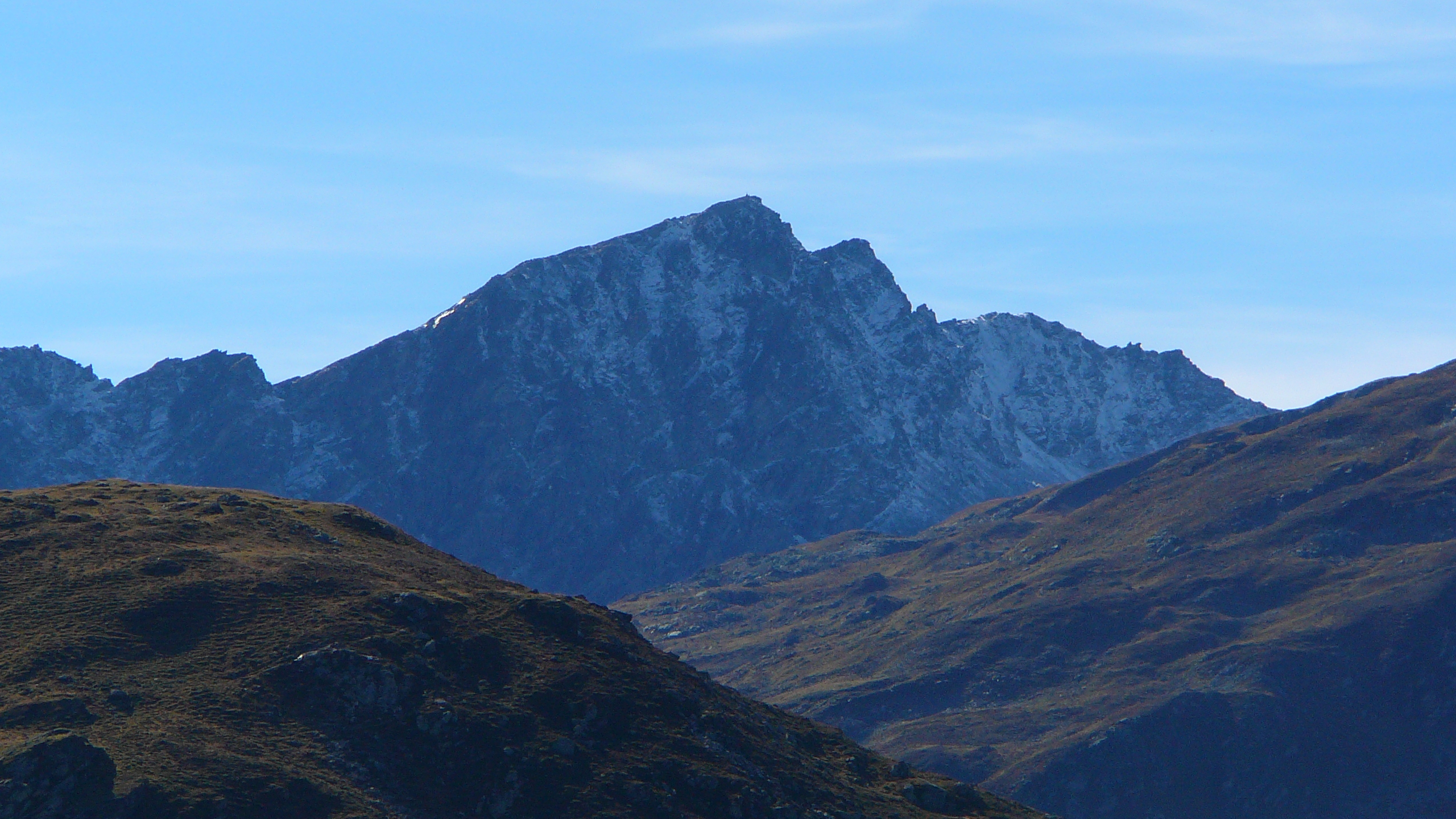

Highest point
- Elevation: 2,890 m (9,480 ft)
- Prominence: 355 m (1,165 ft)
- Parent peak: Piz Cavel
- Coordinates: 46°40′39.2″N 9°01′21.8″E

Naming
- Native name: Piz Gren (Romansh); Schwarzhorn (German)

Geography
- Location within Switzerland
- Country: Switzerland
- Canton: Graubünden
- Parent range: Lepontine Alps

Piz Gren (German: Schwarzhorn) is a mountain of the Swiss Lepontine Alps, located between Tenigerbad and Lumbrein in the canton of Graubünden. Its summit (2,890 metres (9,480 ft)) lies near the tripoint between Val Sumvitg, Val Gronda, and Val Miedra.
