= Piz Pian Grand =

Mountain in Switzerland

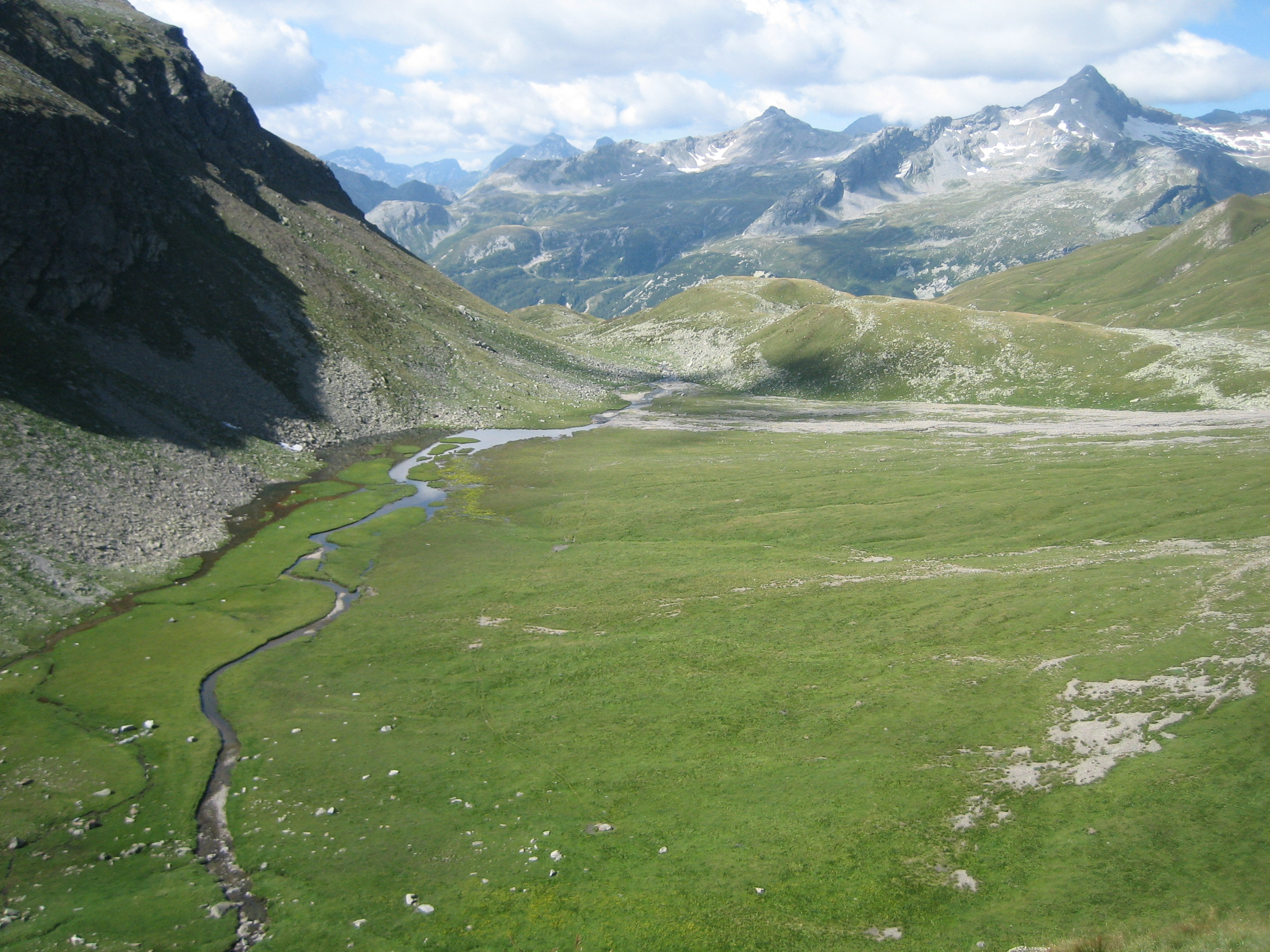
- Pian Grand (right) from Val Vignun

Highest point
- Elevation: 2,689 m (8,822 ft)
- Prominence: 528 m (1,732 ft)
- Parent peak: Cima de Gagela
- Coordinates: 46°25′03.1″N 9°09′20.7″E

Geography
- Location within Switzerland
- Location: Graubünden, Switzerland
- Parent range: Lepontine Alps

Piz Pian Grand is a mountain of the Lepontine Alps, situated between the Val Calanca and the Mesolcina in the Swiss canton of Graubünden.
