= Piz Badus =

Mountain in Switzerland

- Six Madun
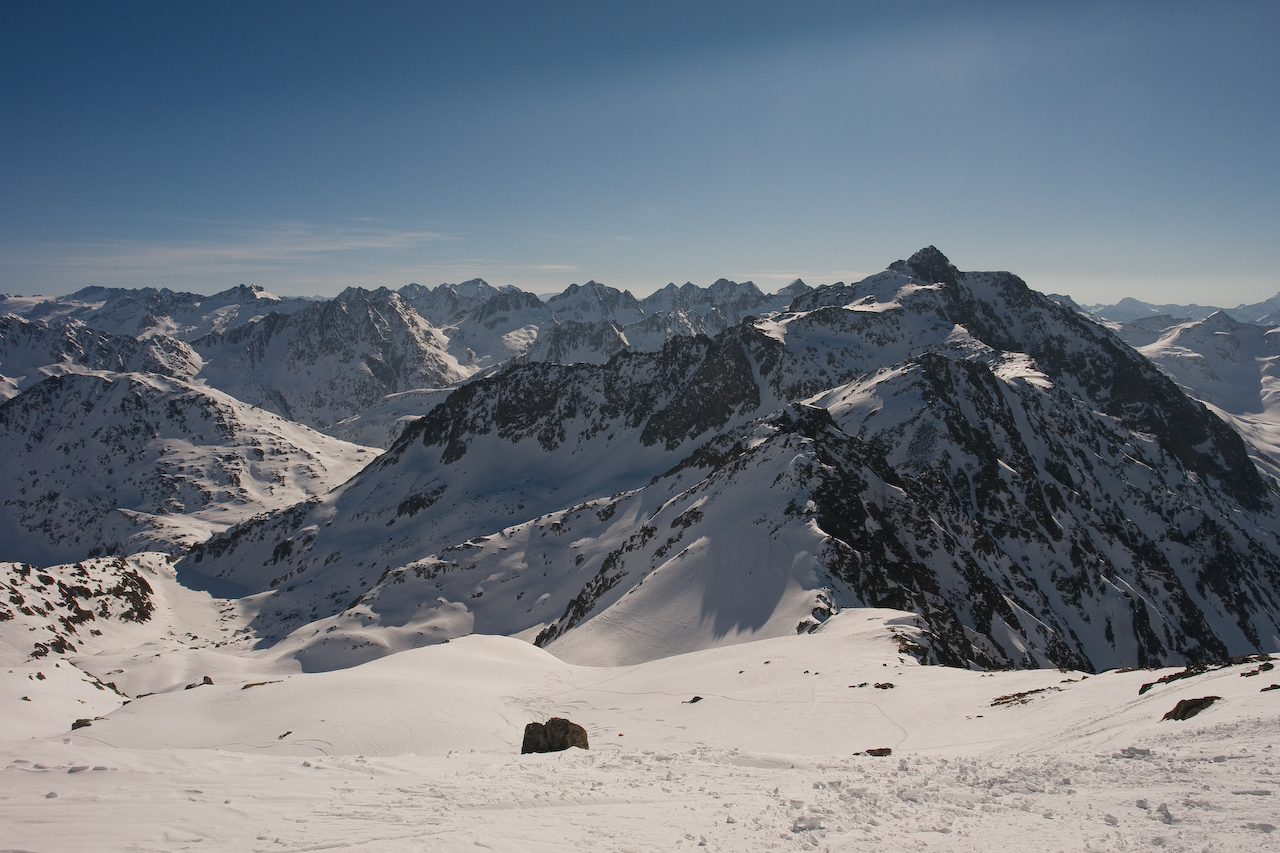
- Piz Badus from North, bottom left a plain is visible which is Tomasee, source of the river Rhine

Highest point
- Elevation: 2,928 m (9,606 ft)
- Prominence: 529 m (1,736 ft)
- Parent peak: Piz Gannaretsch (3040 m)
- Listing: Mountains of Uri; Mountains of Graubünden
- Coordinates: 46°37′20″N 8°39′48″E

Geography
- Location within Switzerland
- Country: Switzerland
- Cantons: Uri and Graubünden
- Village: Andermatt
- Parent range: Lepontine Alps

Climbing
- Easiest route: southeastern ridge from Val Maighels / Maighels hut

Piz Badus or Six Madun is a mountain in the Lepontine Alps, lying on the border between the cantons of Uri and Graubünden.

In its northwestern face, which is the Graubünden side, lies Tomasee, source of the Anterior Rhine. It is possible to reach the lake on a path from Oberalp Pass, suitable for most walkers although still a mountain trail.
