= Pizzas d'Anarosa =

Mountain in Switzerland

- Grauhörner
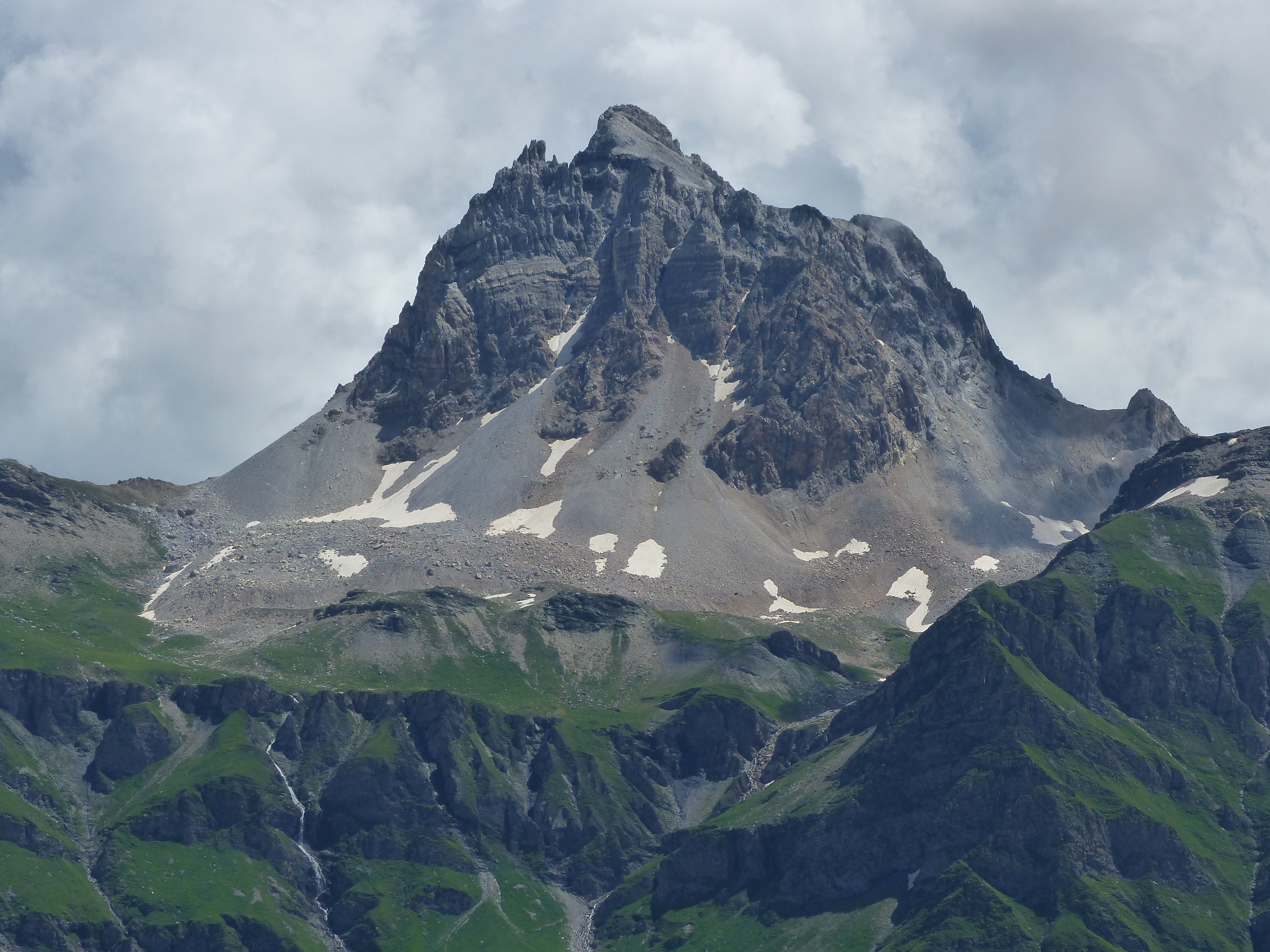

Highest point
- Elevation: 3,002 m (9,849 ft)
- Prominence: 366 m (1,201 ft)
- Parent peak: Bruschghorn
- Listing: Alpine mountains above 3000 m
- Coordinates: 46°35′56.2″N 9°18′56.6″E

Geography
- Location within Switzerland
- Location: Graubünden, Switzerland
- Parent range: Lepontine Alps

The Pizzas d'Anarosa (or Grauhörner) is a mountain of the Swiss Lepontine Alps, located north of Splügen in the canton of Graubünden. It lies between the Safiental and the Hinterrhein valley. The mountain has several summits, the main summit having a height of 3,002 metres.
