= Rosställispitz =

Mountain in Switzerland

- Location within Switzerland

Highest point
- Elevation: 2,929 m (9,610 ft)
- Prominence: 368 m (1,207 ft)
- Parent peak: Flüela Wisshorn
- Coordinates: 46°47′20″N 9°59′36″E

Geography
- Location: Graubünden, Switzerland
- Parent range: Silvretta Alps

The Rosställispitz is a mountain of the Silvretta Alps, located west of Susch in the canton of Graubünden. It lies between the valleys of Vereina and Fless, north-east of the Flüela Wisshorn.
