= Pizzo di Campel =

Mountain of the Lepontine Alps

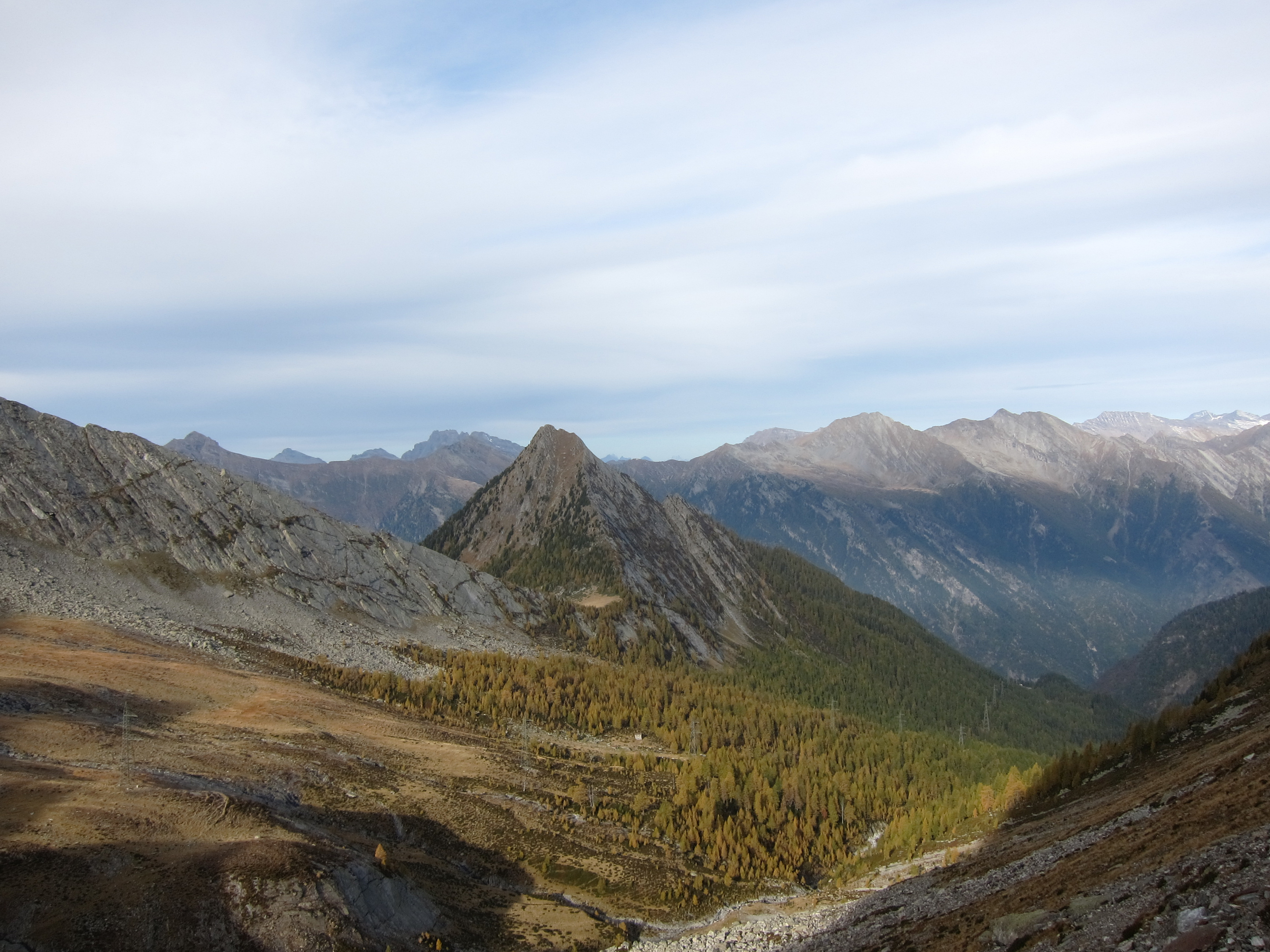
- Pizzo di Campel view from Passo della Forcola

Highest point
- Elevation: 2,376 m (7,795 ft)
- Prominence: 332 m (1,089 ft)
- Parent peak: Piz della Forcola
- Coordinates: 46°19′55″N 09°15′42″E

Geography
- Location within Switzerland
- Location: Graubünden, Switzerland
- Parent range: Lepontine Alps

Pizzo di Campel (2,376 m) is a mountain of the Lepontine Alps, located south-east of Soazza in the canton of Graubünden. It lies on the range between the Val de la Forcola and the Val de Montogn.
