= Piz Surgonda =

Mountain in Switzerland

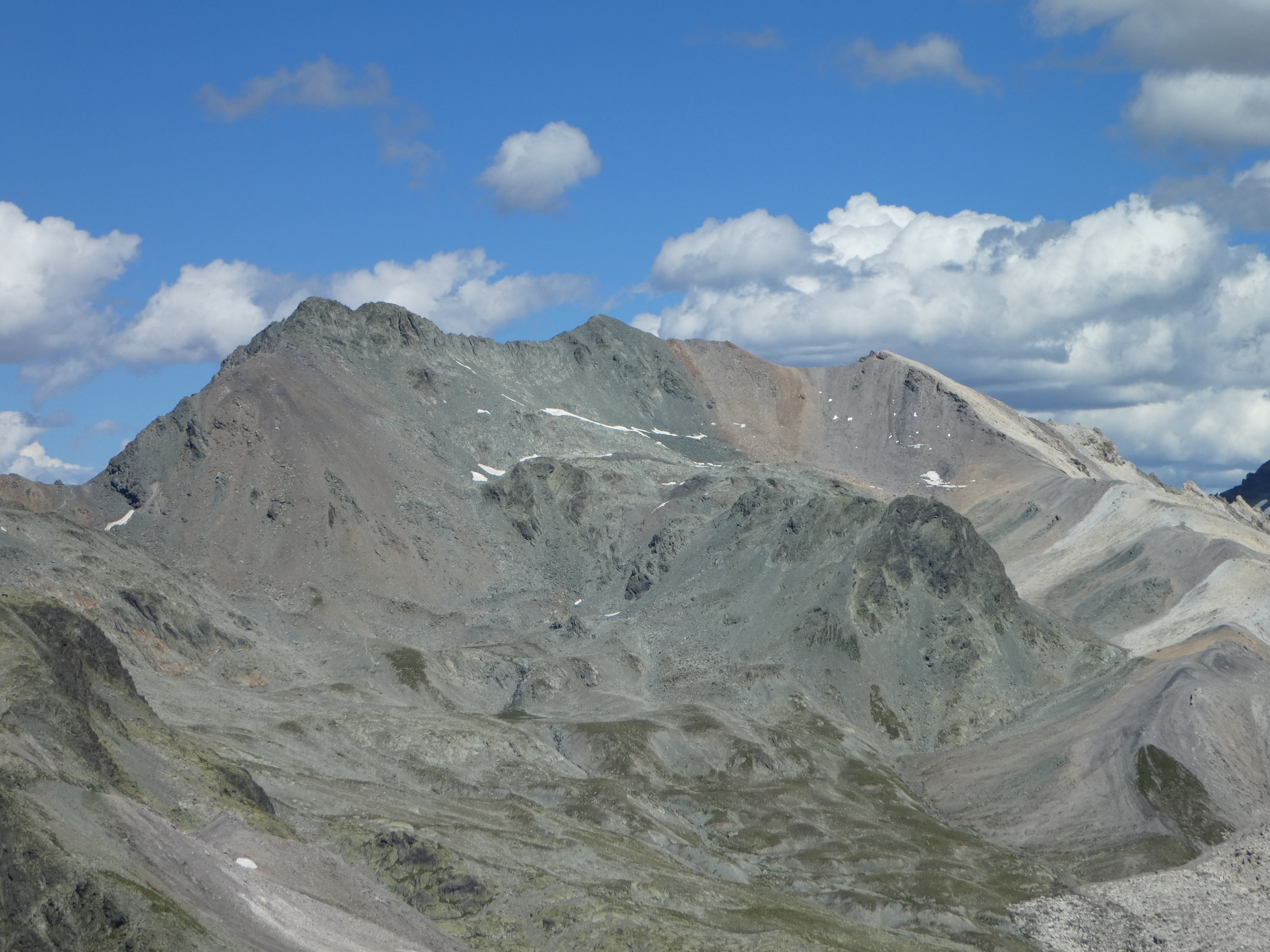
- Piz Surgonda as seen from Piz Neir

Highest point
- Elevation: 3,196 m (10,486 ft)
- Prominence: 210 m (690 ft)
- Parent peak: Piz d'Agnel
- Coordinates: 46°30′36″N 9°43′30″E

Geography
- Location within Switzerland
- Location: Graubünden, Switzerland
- Parent range: Albula Alps

Piz Surgonda, aerial video

Piz Surgonda is a mountain of the Albula Alps, located north of the Julier Pass in the canton of Graubünden. It lies on the range surrounding the Val Bever, east of Piz d'Agnel.

Piz Surgonda is composed of two summits of almost equal height: the western summit (3,193 m) and the eastern summit (3,196 m).
