= Tschima da Flix =

Mountain in Switzerland

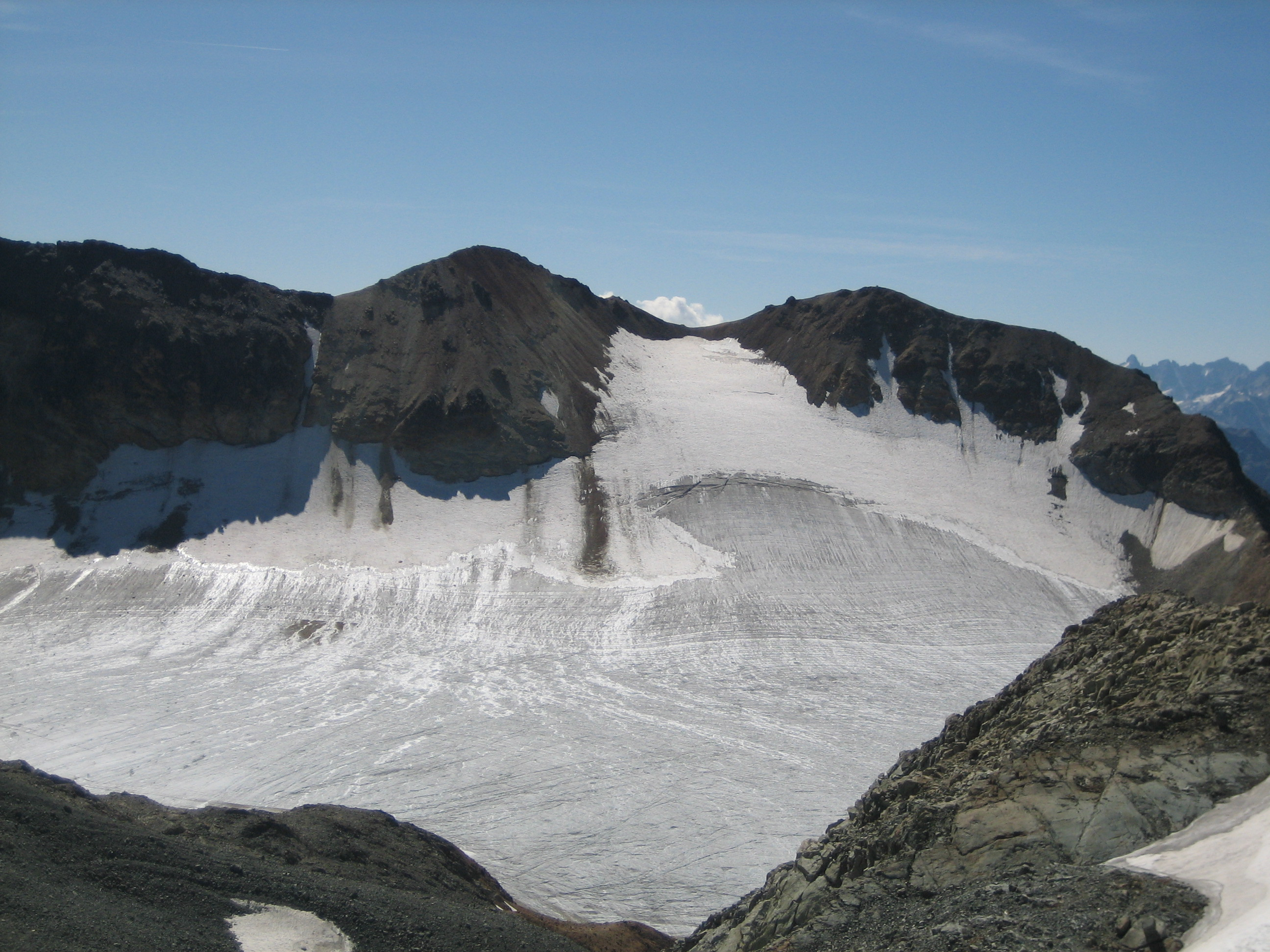
- The north side of Tschima da Flix (center-left summit)

Highest point
- Elevation: 3,316 m (10,879 ft)
- Prominence: 34 m (112 ft)
- Parent peak: Piz Picuogl
- Coordinates: 46°31′18″N 9°41′59.1″E

Geography
- Location within Switzerland
- Location: Graubünden, Switzerland
- Parent range: Albula Alps

Tschima da Flix is a mountain of the Albula Alps, located between Piz Calderas and Piz d'Agnel, in the canton of Graubünden. On the northern side of the mountain lies a glacier named Vadret da Calderas.
