= Chrüz =

Mountain in Switzerland

- Location within Switzerland

Highest point
- Elevation: 2,196 m (7,205 ft)
- Prominence: 589 m (1,932 ft)
- Coordinates: 46°57′18″N 9°46′30″E

Geography
- Location: Graubünden, Switzerland
- Parent range: Rätikon

The Chrüz is a mountain in the Rätikon range of the Alps, located west of St. Antönien in the canton of Graubünden.
