= Piz d'Agnel =

Mountain in Switzerland

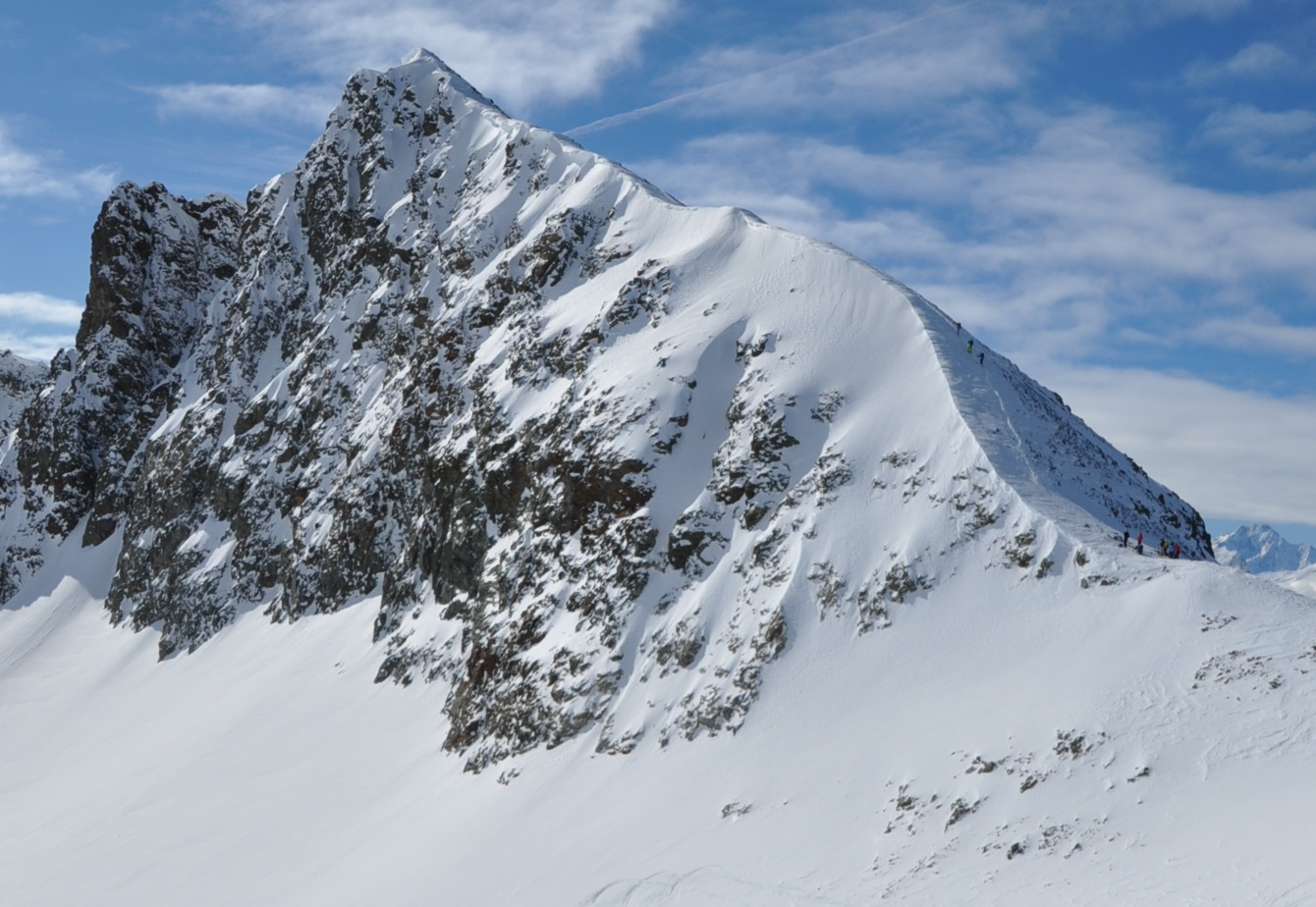
- Piz d'Agnel as seen from Fuorcla da Flix

Highest point
- Elevation: 3,205 m (10,515 ft)
- Prominence: 141 m (463 ft)
- Parent peak: Tschima da Flix
- Listing: Mountains of Switzerland
- Coordinates: 46°30′41.2″N 9°42′8.1″E

Geography
- Location within Switzerland
- Location: Graubünden, Switzerland
- Parent range: Albula Range

Piz d'Agnel is a mountain of the Albula Alps, overlooking Marmorera and its lake, in the Swiss canton of Graubünden. On the north side of the mountain lies a glacier named Vadret d'Agnel.
