= Pizzo del Ramulazz =

Mountain of the Lepontine Alps

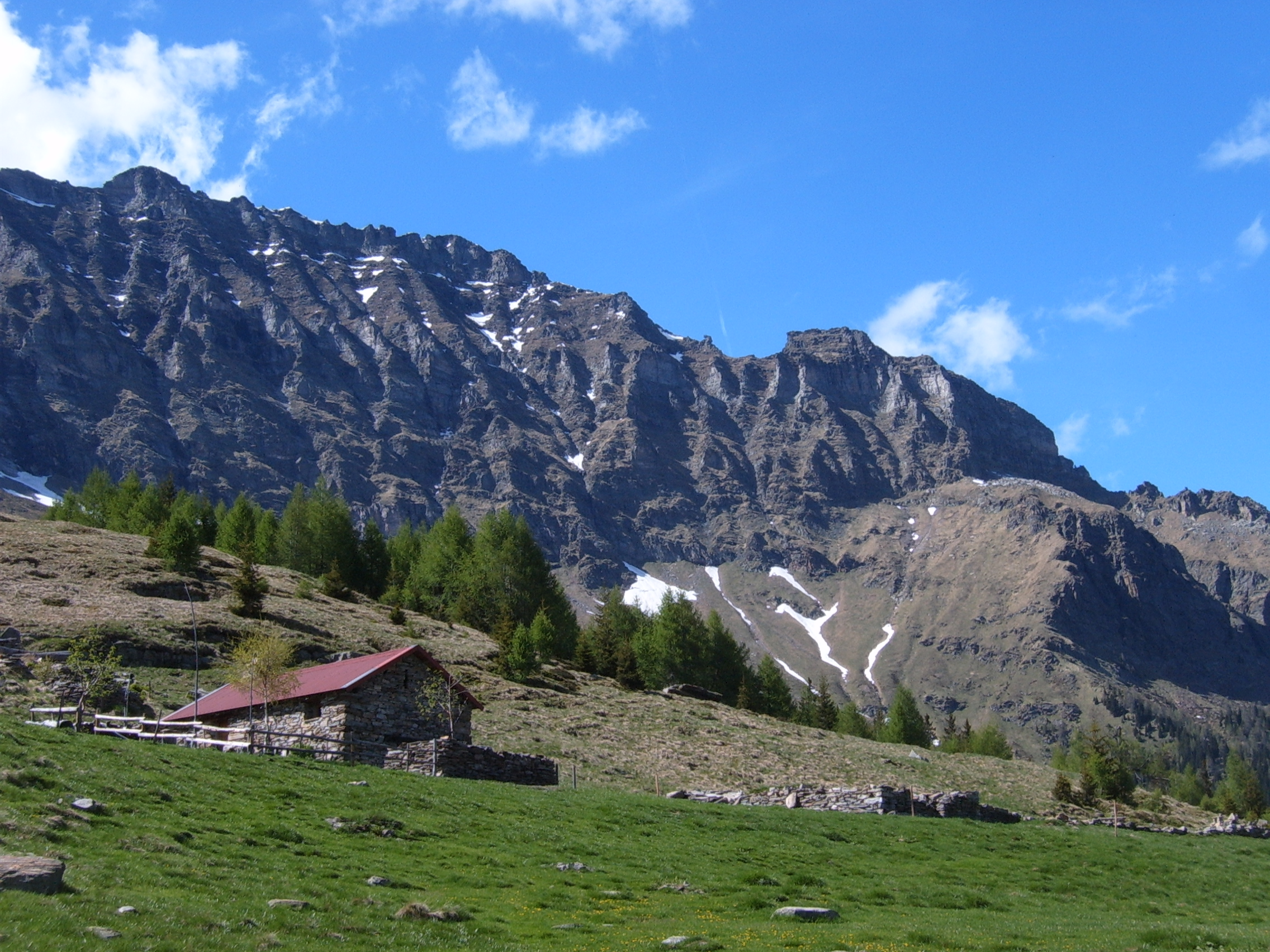
- The east face (summit on the left)

Highest point
- Elevation: 2,939 m (9,642 ft)
- Prominence: 324 m (1,063 ft)
- Parent peak: Rheinwaldhorn
- Coordinates: 46°23′48″N 9°5′34″E

Geography
- Location within Switzerland
- Location: Switzerland
- Parent range: Lepontine Alps

Pizzo del Ramulazz is a 2,939 metres high mountain in the Lepontine Alps, located on the border between the cantons of Ticino and Graubünden. The east side of the mountain, overlooking the Calanca valley, consists of a large and steep face.

A secondary summit (2,915 metres) on the north side overlooks Passo del Ramulazz.
