= Surettahorn =

Mountain in Switzerland

- Pizzo Suretta
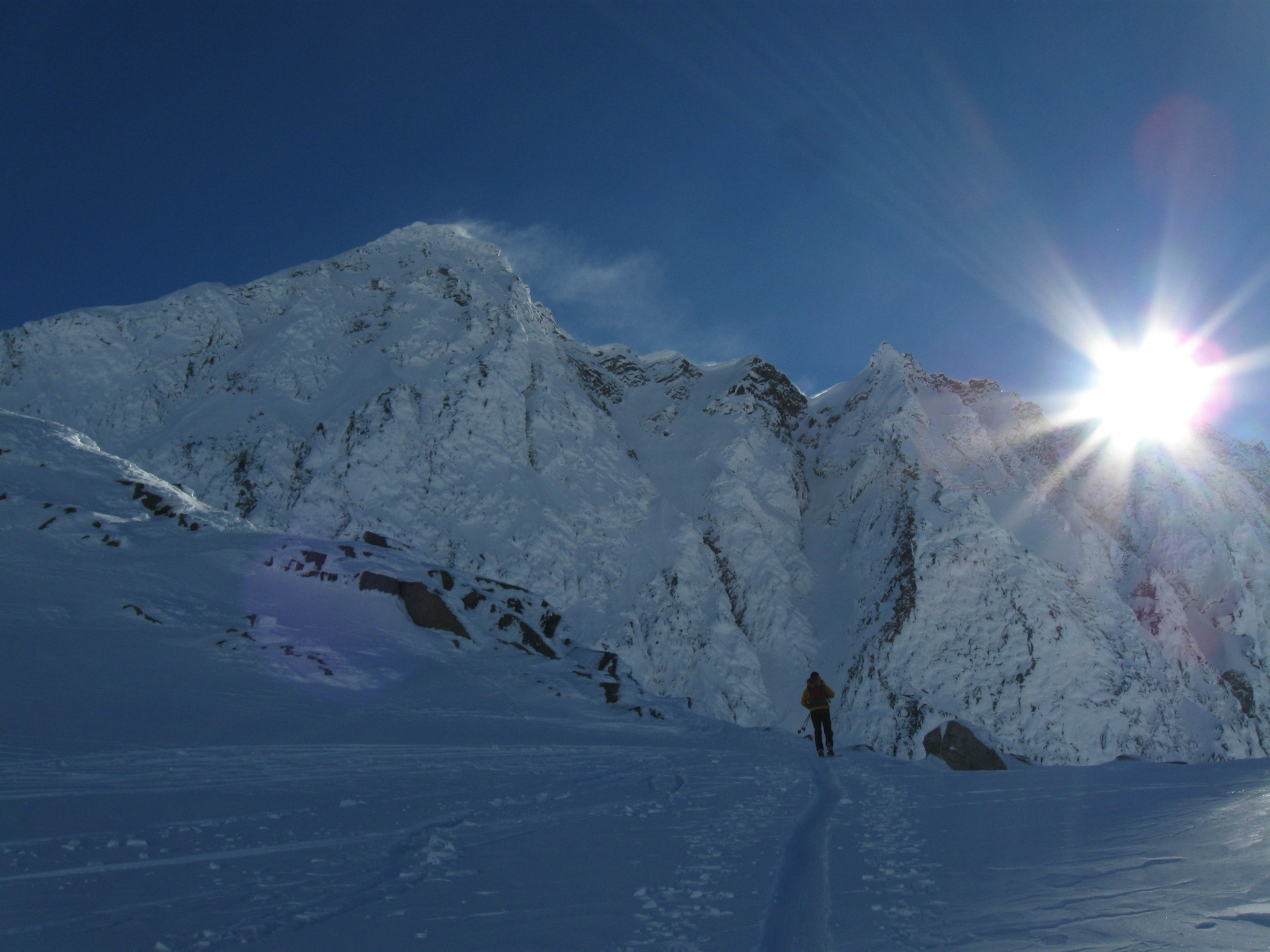
- View from the north-west side

Highest point
- Elevation: 3,027 m (9,931 ft)
- Prominence: 156 m (512 ft)
- Parent peak: Piz Por
- Coordinates: 46°30′35″N 9°21′45″E

Geography
- Location within Alps
- Location: Lombardy, Italy; Graubünden, Switzerland
- Parent range: Oberhalbstein Range

The Surettahorn (also known as Pizzo Suretta) is a mountain in the Oberhalbstein Range of the Alps located on the border between Italy and Switzerland. It overlooks the Splügen Pass on its west side.

The Surettahorn has two summits: Punta Nera (3,027 metres [9,931 ft]) and Punta Rossa (3,020 metres [9,910 ft]).
