= Piz Prüna =

Mountain in Switzerland

- Location within Switzerland

Highest point
- Elevation: 3,153 m (10,344 ft)
- Prominence: 317 m (1,040 ft)
- Parent peak: Piz Languard
- Listing: Alpine mountains above 3000 m
- Coordinates: 46°29′14.1″N 9°59′14.2″E

Geography
- Location: Graubünden, Switzerland
- Parent range: Livigno Alps

Piz Prüna is a mountain of the Livigno Alps, located in Graubünden, Switzerland. Its 3,153-metre-high (10,344 ft) summit overlooks the Val Prüna.
