= Höhberghorn =

Mountain in Switzerland

- Location within Switzerland

Highest point
- Elevation: 3,005 m (9,859 ft)
- Prominence: 166 m (545 ft)
- Parent peak: Rheinwaldhorn
- Coordinates: 46°30′35.1″N 9°6′11.4″E

Geography
- Location: Graubünden, Switzerland
- Parent range: Lepontine Alps

The Höhberghorn is a mountain of the Lepontine Alps, located west of Hinterrhein in the canton of Graubünden. On its eastern flank lies a glacier named Höhberggletscher.
