= Piz Blaisun =

Mountain in Switzerland

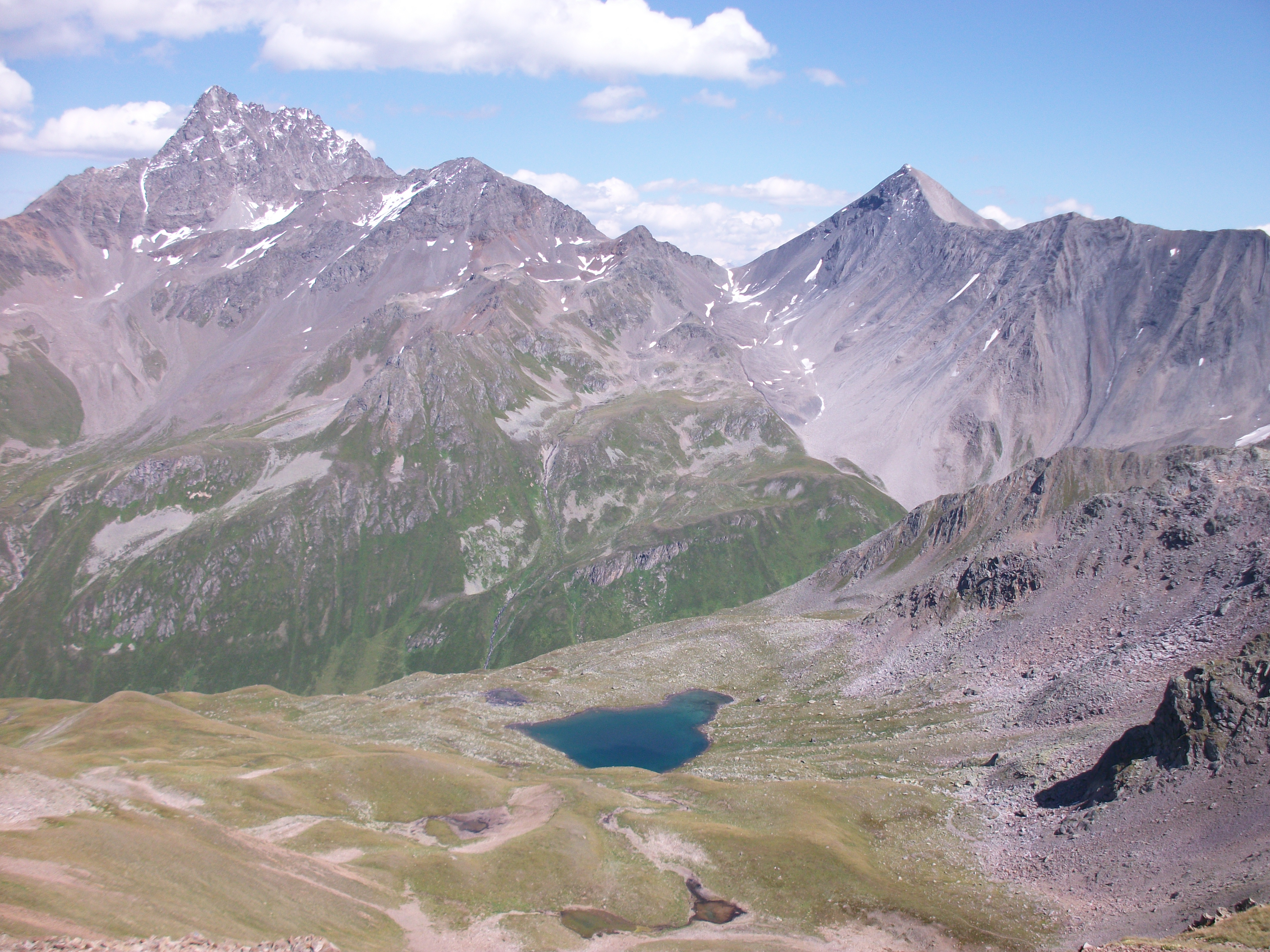
- Piz Kesch (left) and Piz Blaisun (right)

Highest point
- Elevation: 3,200 m (10,500 ft)
- Prominence: 235 m (771 ft)
- Parent peak: Piz Üertsch
- Coordinates: 46°36′11.4″N 9°51′46.3″E

Geography
- Location within Switzerland
- Location: Graubünden, Switzerland
- Parent range: Albula Alps

Piz Blaisun (3,200 m) is a mountain of the Albula Alps, located north of the Albula Pass in the canton of Graubünden. Its summit is the tripoint between the Val Tuors, the Val d'Alvra (Albula valley) and the Val d'Es-cha.
