= Piz Beverin =

Mountain in Switzerland

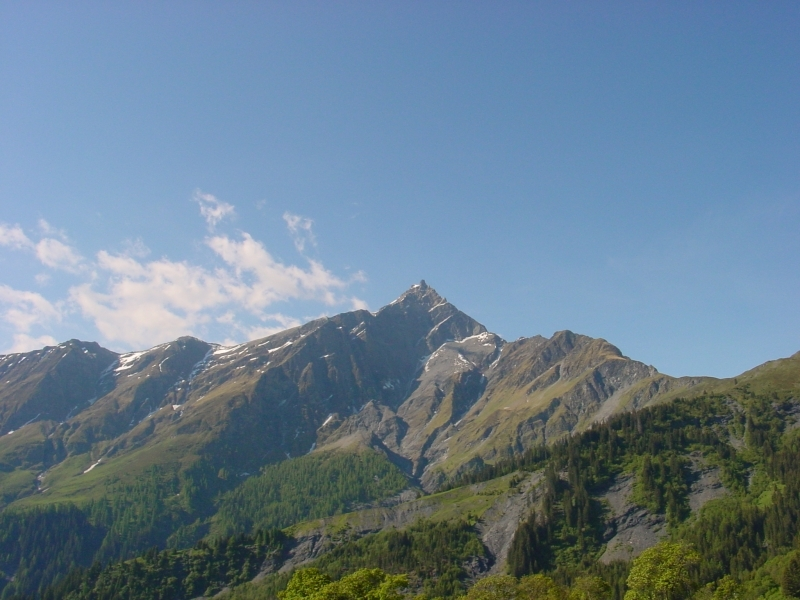
- Piz Beverin seen from Heinzenberg

Highest point
- Elevation: 2,998 m (9,836 ft)
- Prominence: 396 m (1,299 ft)
- Parent peak: Bruschghorn
- Coordinates: 46°39′8.9″N 9°21′28.4″E

Geography
- Location within Switzerland
- Location: Graubünden, Switzerland
- Parent range: Lepontine Alps

Piz Beverin is a mountain of the Lepontine Alps, overlooking Thusis in the canton of Graubünden. A trail leads to the summit.

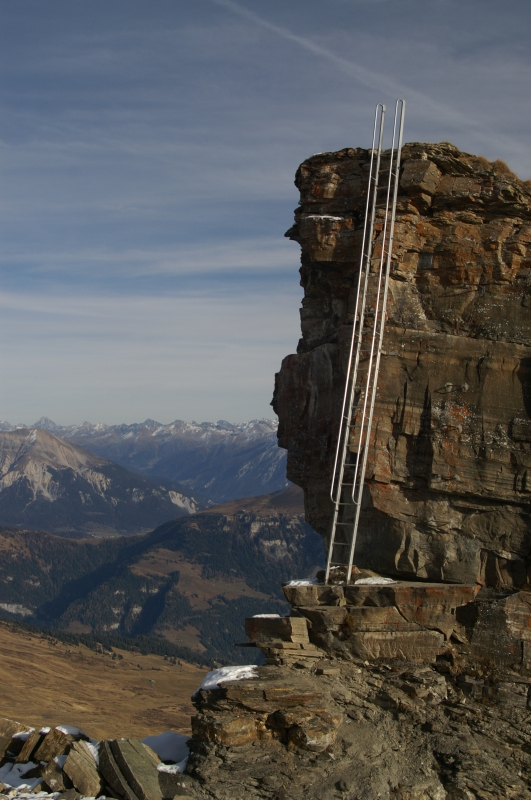
On the south-east ridge
