= Piz Cavradi =

Mountain in Switzerland

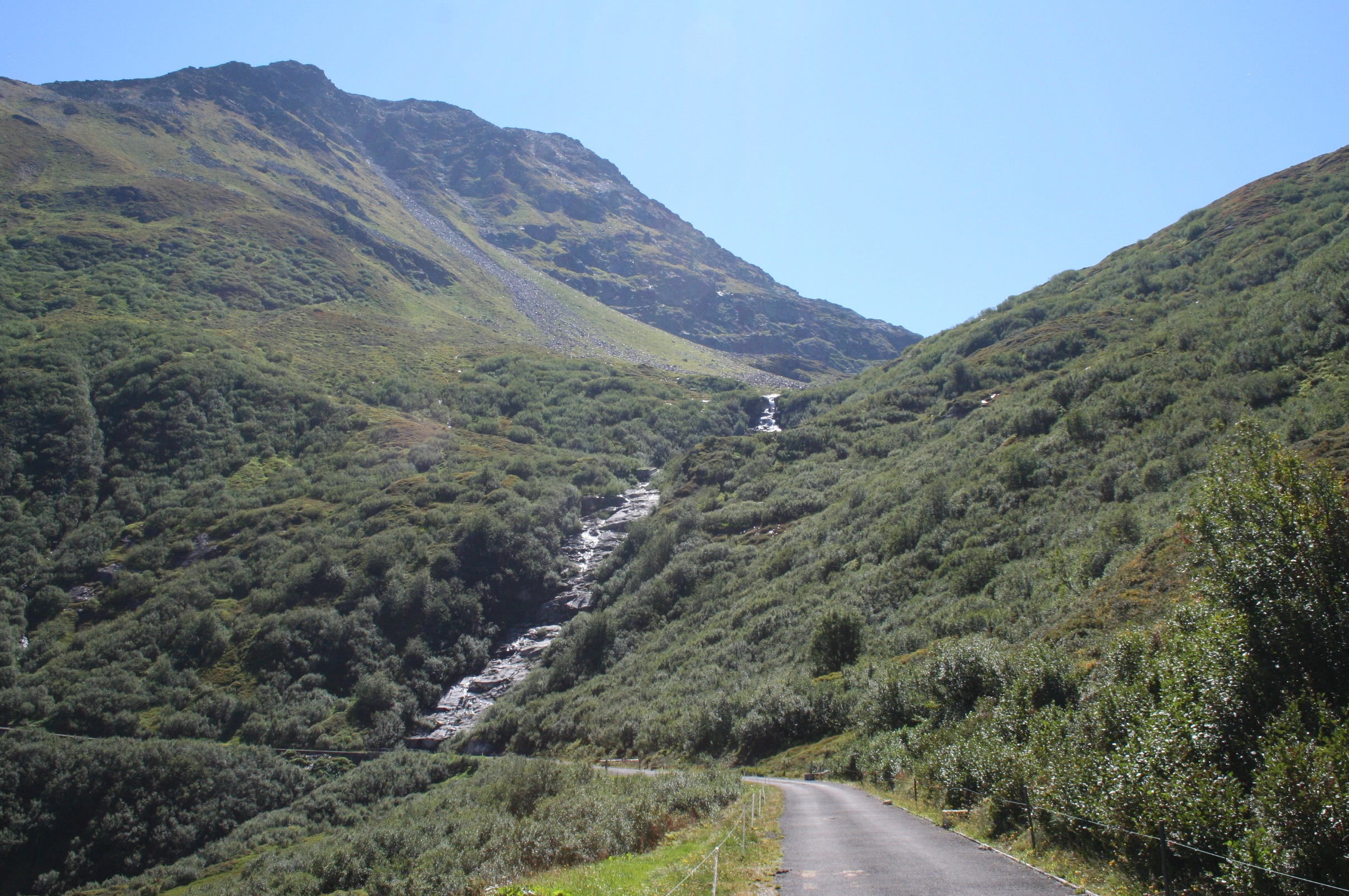
- View from the north side

Highest point
- Elevation: 2,614 m (8,576 ft)
- Prominence: 351 m (1,152 ft)
- Parent peak: Piz Gannaretsch
- Coordinates: 46°37′57.9″N 8°41′45″E

Geography
- Location within Switzerland
- Location: Graubünden, Switzerland
- Parent range: Lepontine Alps

Piz Cavradi is a mountain of the Swiss Lepontine Alps, located south of Tschamut in the canton of Graubünden.
