= Piz Por =

Mountain in Switzerland

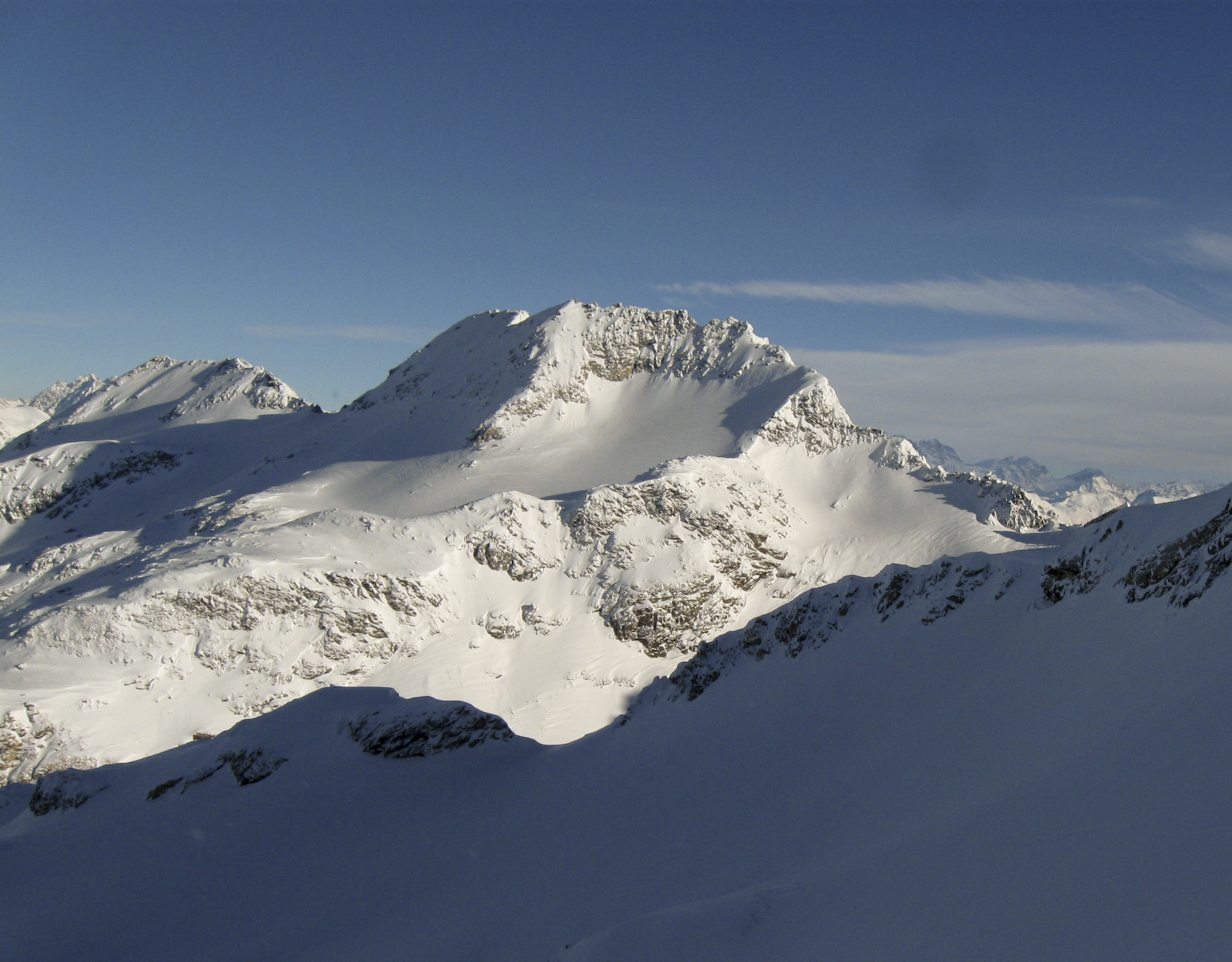
- View from the Surettahorn (west side)

Highest point
- Elevation: 3,028 m (9,934 ft)
- Prominence: 733 m (2,405 ft)
- Parent peak: Piz Platta
- Listing: Alpine mountains above 3000 m
- Coordinates: 46°30′33.9″N 9°23′3.2″E

Geography
- Location within Switzerland
- Location: Graubünden, Switzerland
- Parent range: Oberhalbstein Range

Piz Por (3,028 m) is a mountain of the Oberhalbstein Alps, located west of Innerferrera in the canton of Graubünden. It is the culminating point of the group between the Splügen Pass and the Niemet Pass.
