= Guggernüll =

Mountain in Switzerland

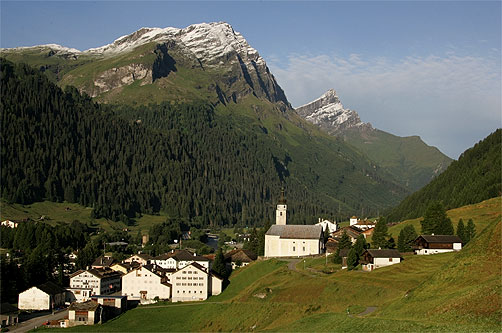
- The Guggernüll and the Einshorn in background, view from Splügen (east side)

Highest point
- Elevation: 2,886 m (9,469 ft)
- Prominence: 377 m (1,237 ft)
- Parent peak: Pizzo Tambo
- Coordinates: 46°31′25.4″N 9°16′17.1″E

Geography
- Location within Switzerland
- Location: Graubünden, Switzerland
- Parent range: Lepontine Alps

The Guggernüll is a mountain of the Swiss Lepontine Alps, overlooking Nufenen in the canton of Graubünden. It lies north of Pizzo Tambo.

== Gallery ==
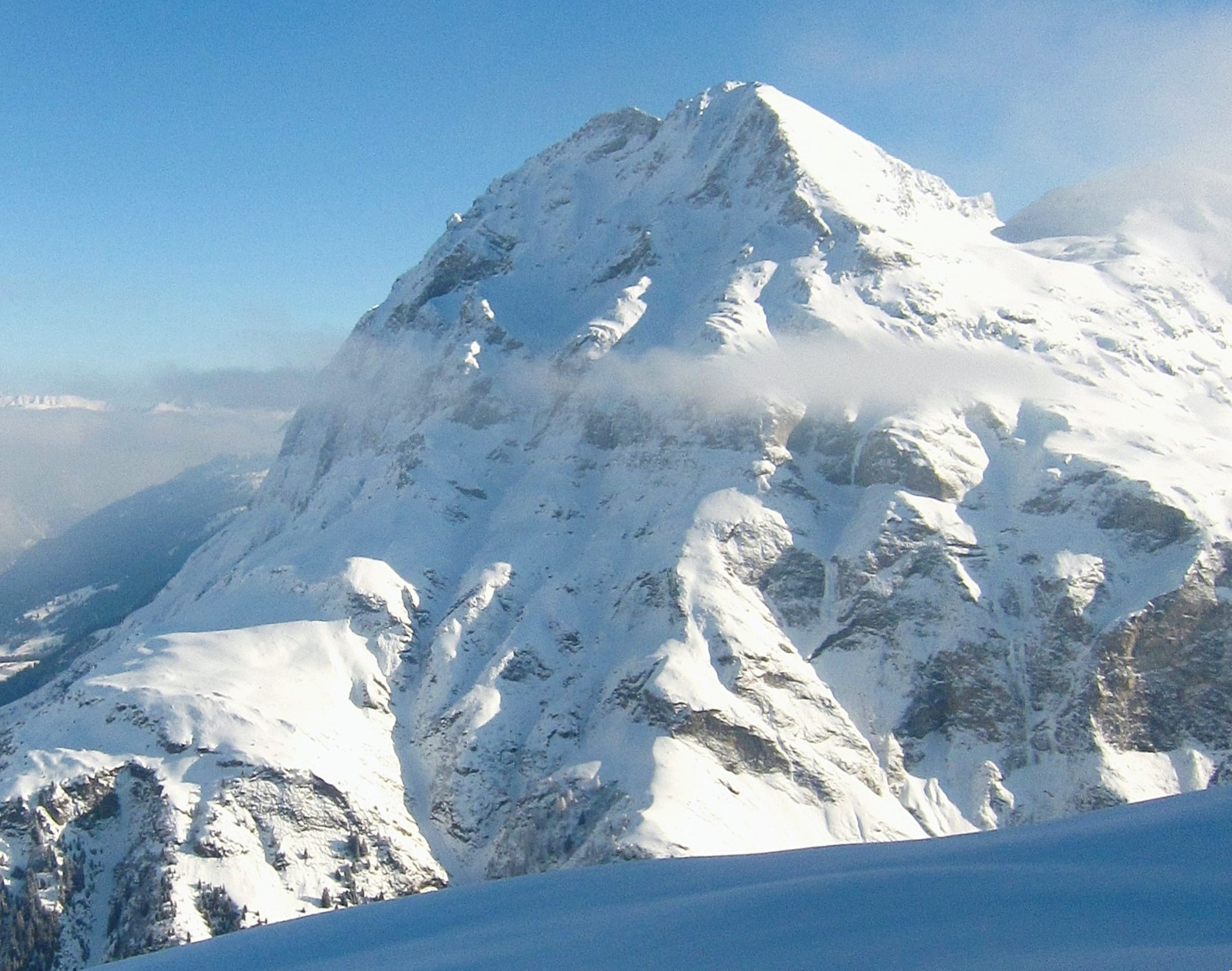
West aspect in winter
