= Piz la Stretta =

Mountain in Switzerland

- Monte Breva
- Location within Alps

Highest point
- Elevation: 3,104 m (10,184 ft)
- Prominence: 314 m (1,030 ft)
- Parent peak: Piz Languard
- Listing: Alpine mountains above 3000 m
- Coordinates: 46°28′37″N 10°02′41″E

Geography
- Location: Lombardy, Italy/Graubünden, Switzerland
- Parent range: Livigno Alps

Piz la Stretta (also known as Monte Breva) is a mountain of the Livigno Alps, located on the border between Italy and Switzerland. Its 3,104-metre (10,184 ft) high summit overlooks the pass of La Stretta (2,476 m)

== Access roads and normal climbing route ==
The most convenient starting point is the south route that begins at the Forcola pass (2315 m), which is at the border between Italy and Switzerland. From the Italian side, the pass can be reached by car from the nearby Livigno, and from the Swiss side this is the road from the Bernina pass.

From the east side, there is a route that starts at some lower point at Campacciolo di Sopra (1910 m), closer to Livigno. Another route from the Italian side is again from the road to Forcola, from Valle della Forcola. From the Swiss side, the route goes up the Val da Fain in the east direction to the Passo del Fieno where it joins the other described routes. From the Forcola pass, you will need about 3 1/2 hours to the summit. This is a simple walk up, no exposed sections, see more in the links below.
