= Kirchlispitzen =

Mountain in Switzerland

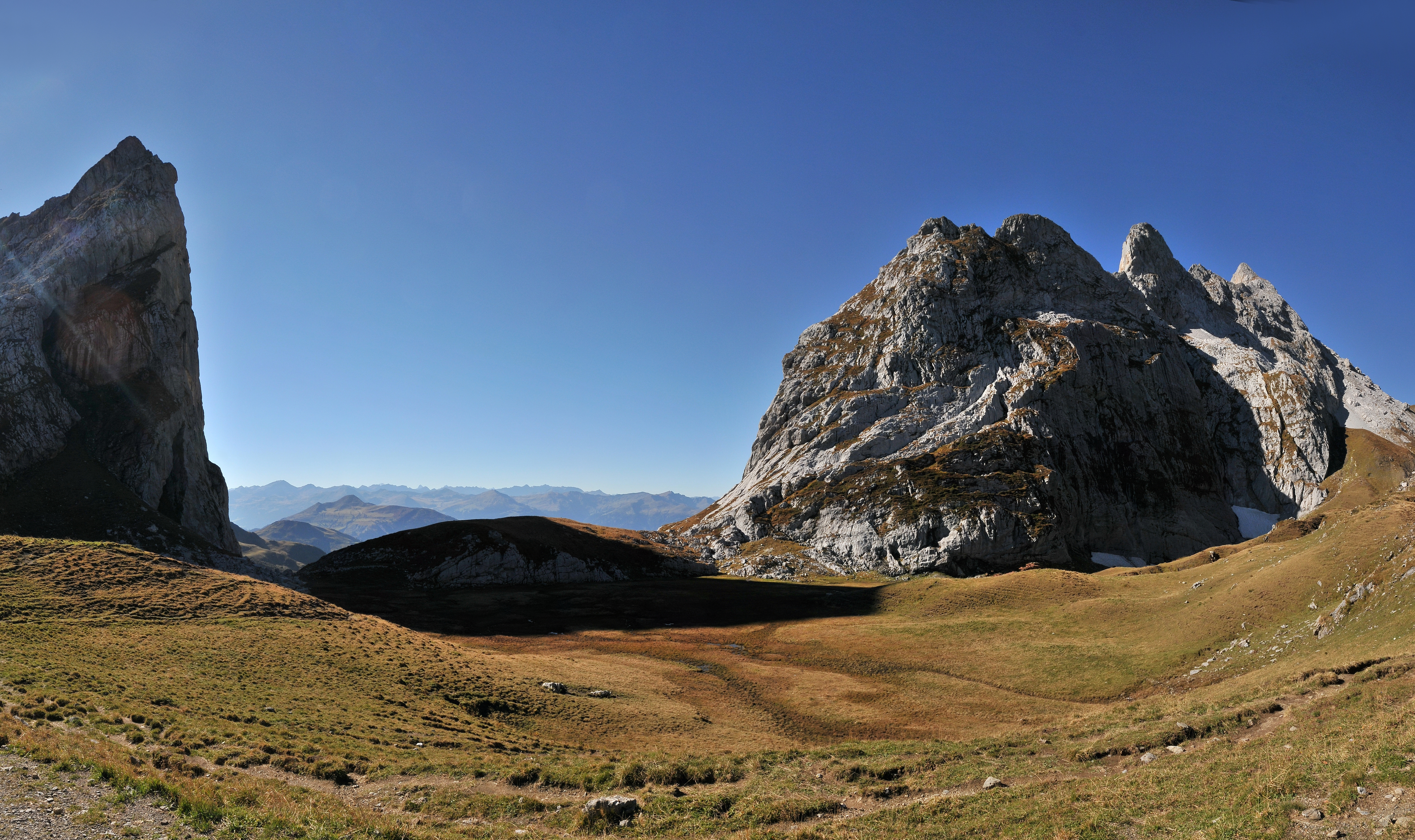
- The Kirchlispitzen (right) from Schweizertor (east side)

Highest point
- Elevation: 2,552 m (8,373 ft)
- Prominence: 313 m (1,027 ft)
- Parent peak: Schesaplana
- Coordinates: 47°02′20″N 9°46′07″E

Geography
- Location within Alps
- Location: Vorarlberg, Austria; Graubünden, Switzerland
- Parent range: Rätikon

The Kirchlispitzen (2,552 m) is a mountain in the Rätikon range of the Alps, located on the border between Austria and Switzerland. It overlooks the Lünersee on its northern side.
