= Bernina District =

Coordinates: 46°20′8″N 10°4′40″E

Bernina District Distretto di Bernina
- District
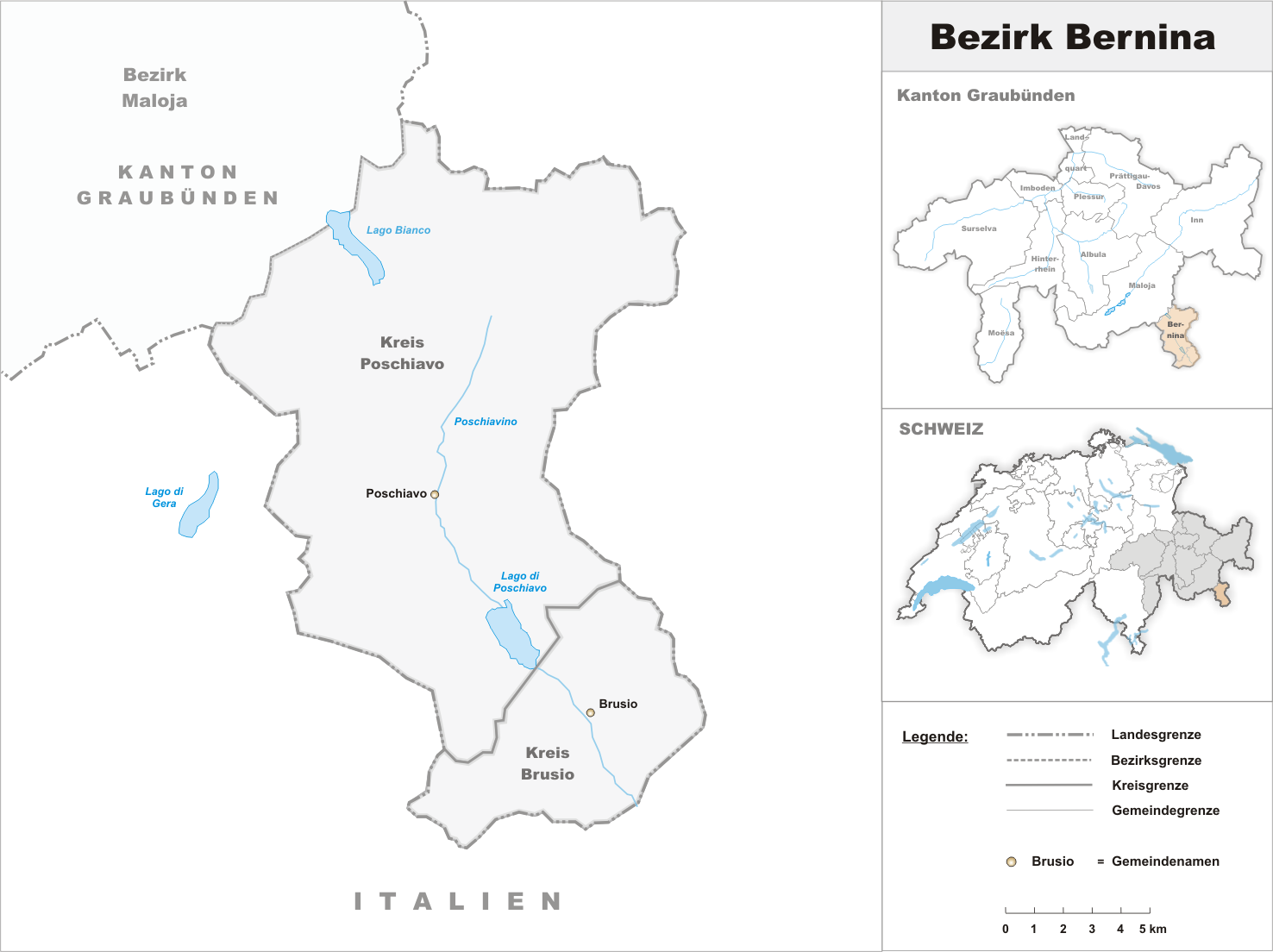
- Country: Switzerland
- Canton: Graubünden
- Capital: Poschiavo

Area
  - Total: 237.30 km^{2} (91.62 sq mi)

Population (2020)
  - Total: 4,619
  - Density: 19.46/km^{2} (50.41/sq mi)
- Time zone: UTC+1 (CET)
  - Summer (DST): UTC+2 (CEST)
- Municipalities: 2

Bernina District is a former administrative district in the canton of Graubünden, Switzerland. It had an area of 237.2 km^{2} and a population of 4,619 in 2015. It was replaced with the Bernina Region on 1 January 2017 as part of a reorganization of the Canton.

It is the most south-easterly district in Switzerland, being surrounded on three sides by Italy and is predominantly Italian-speaking. As of 2000, 91% of the population speak Italian, followed by German (7.2%) and Romansh (0.5%).

Bernina District consisted of two sub-districts, Brusio and Poschiavo, each of which contains a single municipality of the same name.

Brusio sub-district
Municipality	Population (31 December 2020)	Area (km^{2})
Brusio	1,120	46.25

Poschiavo sub-district
Municipality	Population (31 December 2020)	Area (km^{2})
Poschiavo	3,441	190.95

== Languages ==
The official language of the district of Bernina is Italian.

Languages of Bernina District, GR
Languages	Census 2000	
Languages	Number	Percent
Italian	4,028	91.0%
German	319	7.2%
Romansh	22	0.5%
TOTAL	4,427	100%
