= Älplihorn =

Mountain in Switzerland

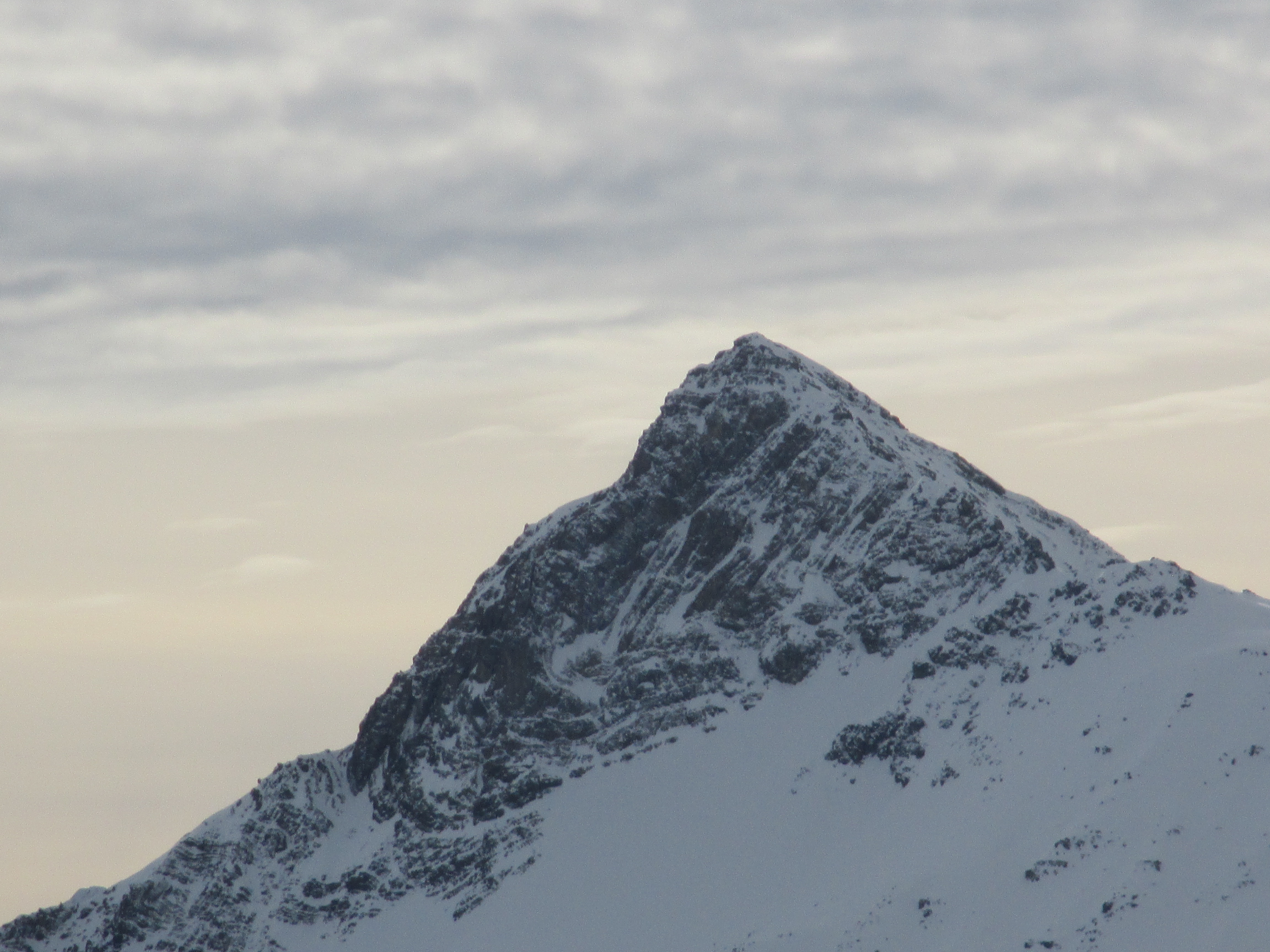
- Älplihorn Sertig

Highest point
- Elevation: 3,006 m (9,862 ft)
- Prominence: 426 m (1,398 ft)
- Parent peak: Piz Vadret
- Listing: Alpine mountains above 3000 m
- Coordinates: 46°42′38.9″N 9°49′32.6″E

Geography
- Location within Switzerland
- Location: Graubünden, Switzerland
- Parent range: Albula Alps

Älplihorn (Albula Range), aerial video

The Älplihorn is a mountain of the Albula Alps, overlooking Monstein in the canton of Graubünden, Switzerland.
