= Piz Picuogl =

Mountain in Switzerland

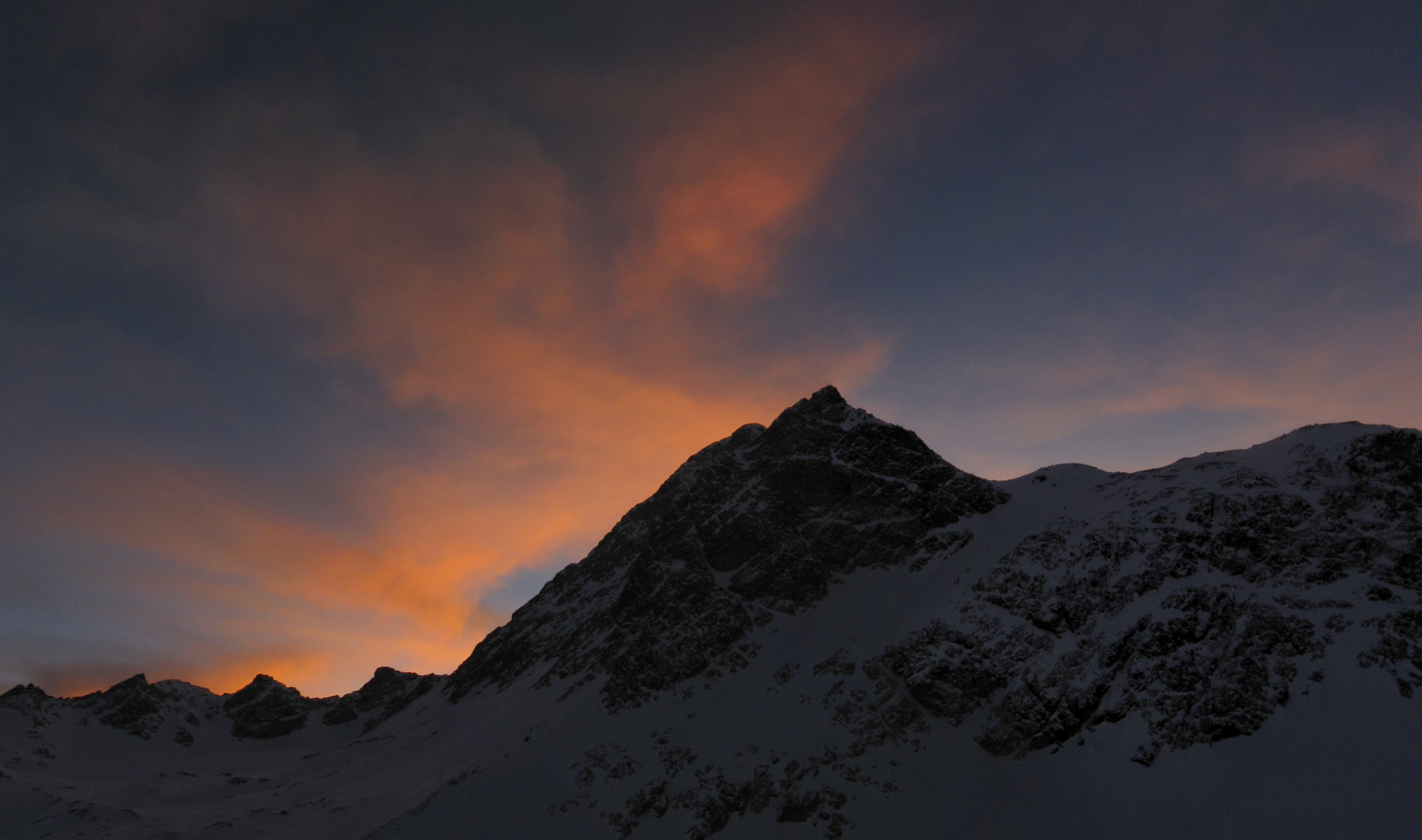

Highest point
- Elevation: 3,333 m (10,935 ft)
- Prominence: 239 m (784 ft)
- Parent peak: Piz Calderas
- Coordinates: 46°31′26.7″N 9°42′28.5″E

Geography
- Location within Switzerland
- Location: Graubünden, Switzerland
- Parent range: Albula Alps

Piz Picuogl is a mountain of the Albula Alps, located between Mulegns and the Val Bever, in Graubünden. On its northern side lies the glacier Vadret da Calderas. On the same ridge is located the lower summit Tschima da Flix.
