= Piz Fess =

Mountain in Switzerland

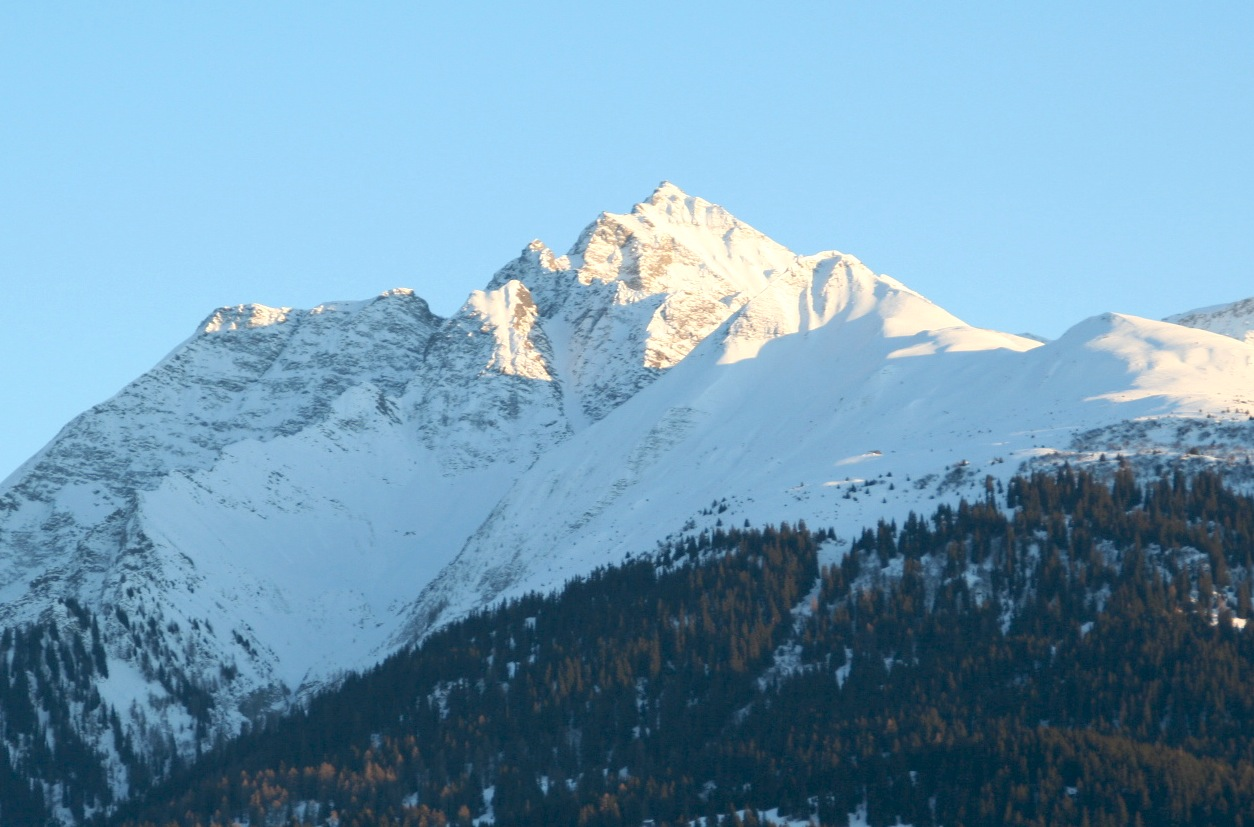
- View from Laax (north side)

Highest point
- Elevation: 2,880 m (9,450 ft)
- Prominence: 501 m (1,644 ft)
- Parent peak: Rheinwaldhorn
- Coordinates: 46°43′40.9″N 9°17′22.7″E

Geography
- Location within Switzerland
- Location: Graubünden, Switzerland
- Parent range: Lepontine Alps

Climbing
- First ascent: 10 August 1895 by Karl Viescher, Wieland Wieland and J. Christoffel.

Piz Fess is a mountain of the Lepontine Alps, situated between the Val Lumnezia and Safiental in the canton of Graubünden. Piz Fess is the culminating point of the Signina range (Romansh: Cadeina dil Signina).

The mountain has two summits, a gentle summit named the Guter Fess ("Good Fess"; 2,874 m) and a not so gentle one named Böser Fess ("Angry Fess"; 2,880 m). In 1894 the pinnacle was still described as unclimbable, but the next summer Karl Viescher from Basel and the local guides Wieland Wieland and J. Christoffel reached the sharp summit.

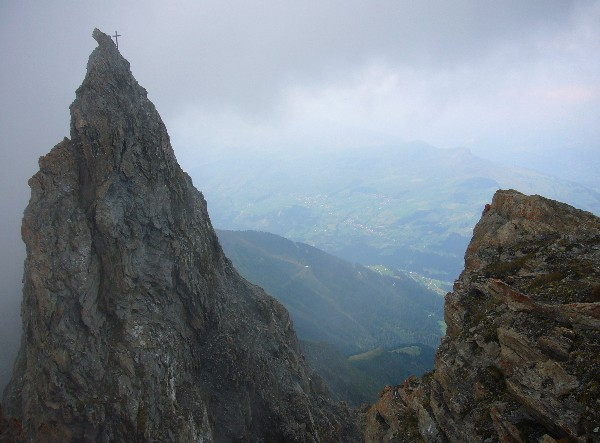
The summit of Böser Fess seen from the Guter Fess
