= Cima de Gagela =

Mountain in Switzerland

- Location within Switzerland

Highest point
- Elevation: 2,805 m (9,203 ft)
- Prominence: 723 m (2,372 ft)
- Parent peak: Rheinwaldhorn
- Coordinates: 46°23′3.6″N 9°10′28.3″E

Geography
- Location: Graubünden, Switzerland
- Parent range: Lepontine Alps

Cima de Gagela is a mountain of the Lepontine Alps, located between the Val Calanca and the Mesolcina, in the canton of Graubünden. With a height of 2,805 metres above sea level, it is the highest summit of the range located south of Pass di Passit (2,082 metres). The mountain lies approximately halfway between Rossa and Mesocco.
