= Piz della Forcola =

Mountain in Switzerland

- Location within Alps

Highest point
- Elevation: 2,675 m (8,776 ft)
- Prominence: 449 m (1,473 ft)
- Parent peak: Pizzo Tambo
- Coordinates: 46°19′04″N 9°17′35″E

Geography
- Location: Lombardy, Italy/Graubünden, Switzerland
- Parent range: Lepontine Alps

Piz della Forcola is a mountain of the Lepontine Alps, located on the Swiss-Italian border. With a height of 2,675 metres, it is the highest summit of the chain lying south of the 2,226-metre-high (7,303 ft) pass named Forcola. On its western side it overlooks Val de la Forcola.
