= Flüela Wisshorn =

Mountain in Switzerland

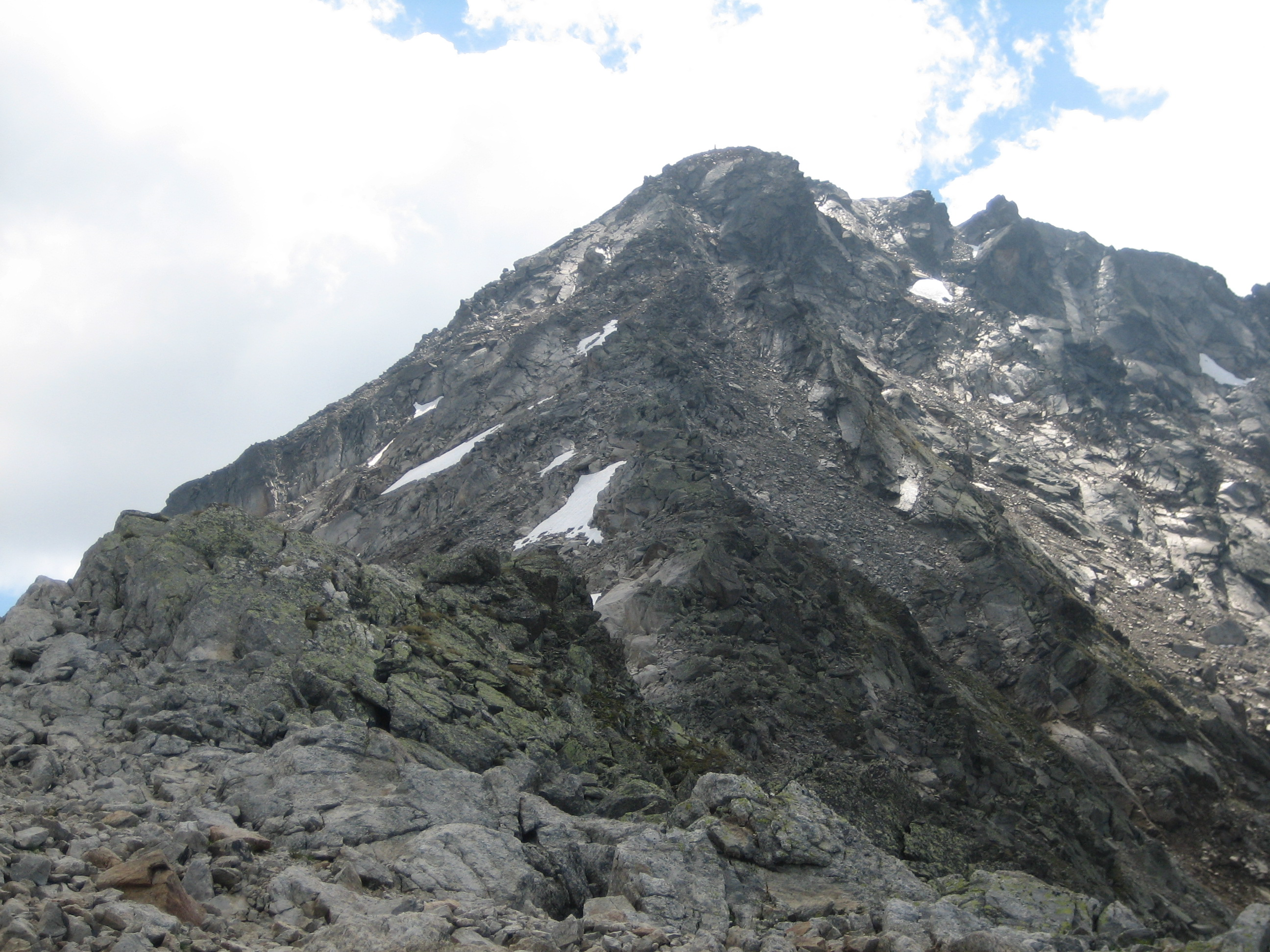
- North side

Highest point
- Elevation: 3,085 m (10,121 ft)
- Prominence: 632 m (2,073 ft)
- Parent peak: Piz Linard
- Listing: Alpine mountains above 3000 m
- Coordinates: 46°45′43.65″N 9°57′59.813″E

Geography
- Location within Switzerland
- Location: Graubünden, Switzerland
- Parent range: Silvretta Alps

Climbing
- First ascent: 1880 by O. Schuster, A. Rzewuski, and B. Tauscher

The Flüela Wisshorn is a mountain of the Silvretta Alps, overlooking the Flüela Pass in the Swiss canton of Graubünden.

== Access roads ==
The climbing route starts from the road which leads to the Fluela pass (2383 m). You can get there by following an attractive road from Davos in the north-west or from Susch in the east.

== The normal route to the summit ==
You can start walking directly from the pass or from the parking at 2207 m above the sea level below the pass in the direction of Davos. This is a simple walk in the north-east direction towards the Winterlucke pass which is at 2787 m. From there the summit is clearly visible, just follow the rocky ridge.
