= Piz Cavel =

Mountain in Switzerland

- Location within Switzerland

Highest point
- Elevation: 2,946 m (9,665 ft)
- Prominence: 518 m (1,699 ft)
- Parent peak: Rheinwaldhorn
- Coordinates: 46°39′21.6″N 9°01′11.4″E

Geography
- Location: Graubünden, Switzerland
- Parent range: Lepontine Alps

Piz Cavel is a mountain of the Lepontine Alps, situated between the Val Sumvitg and the Lumnezia in the canton of Graubünden. The closest locality is Vrin on the eastern side.
