= Bruschghorn =

Mountain in Switzerland

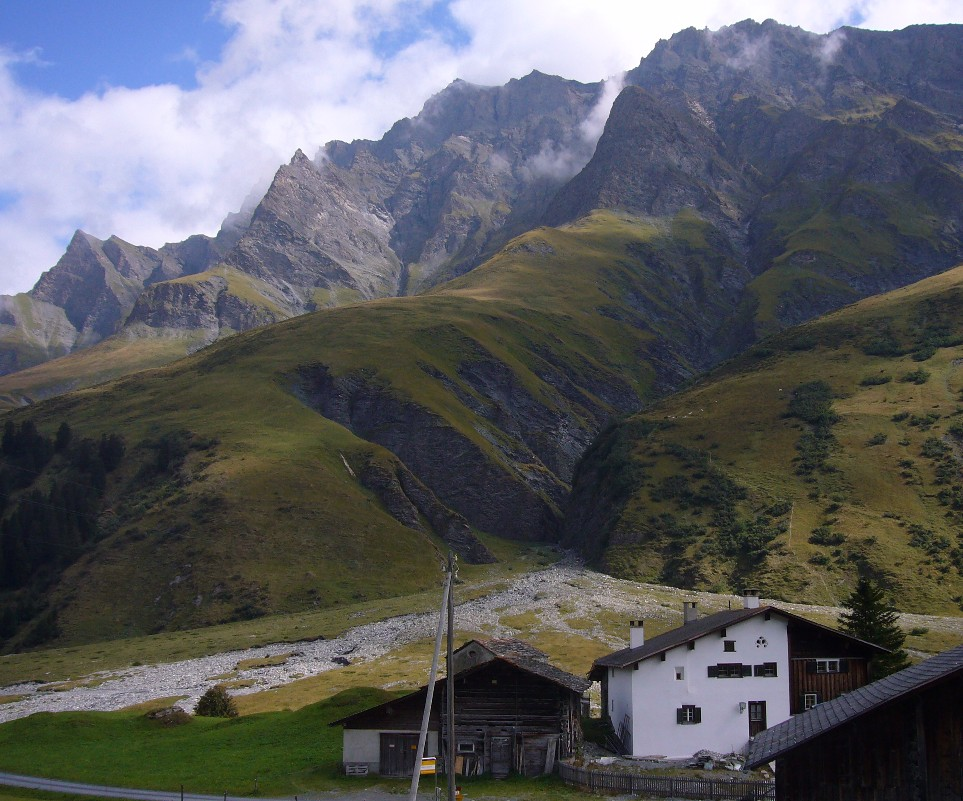
- View from Turrahuus (west side)

Highest point
- Elevation: 3,056 m (10,026 ft)
- Prominence: 577 m (1,893 ft)
- Parent peak: Rheinwaldhorn
- Isolation: 13.8 km (8.6 mi)
- Listing: Alpine mountains above 3000 m
- Coordinates: 46°37′52″N 9°18′23.8″E

Geography
- Location within Switzerland
- Location: Graubünden, Switzerland
- Parent range: Lepontine Alps

The Bruschghorn is a mountain of the Lepontine Alps, overlooking Thalkirch (Safien) in the Swiss canton of Graubünden. With a height of 3,056 metres above sea level, the Bruschghorn is the culminating point of the range lying between the Safiental and the Domleschg valley.

== See also ==
- List of mountains of Graubünden
- List of most isolated mountains of Switzerland
