= Val Viola Pass =

- Location within Alps
- Elevation: 2,468 metres (8,097 ft)
- Traversed by: Trail

Third Approach
- Location: Graubünden, Switzerland; Lombardy, Italy
- Range: Livigno Alps
- Coordinates: 46°24′54″N 10°09′19″E

The Val Viola Pass (Italian: Passo di Val Viola, Romansh: Pass da Val Viola) is a high mountain pass in the Alps on the border between Switzerland and Italy. It connects Poschiavo in the Swiss canton of Graubünden with Valdidentro in the Italian region of Lombardy. The pass lies at a height of 2,468 metres above sea level between Piz Val Nera and Corno di Dosdè.

The pass is traversed by a trail.

== See also ==
- Val Viola Pass on Hikr
