= Piz di Sassiglion =

Mountain in Switzerland

- Pizzo di Sassiglione
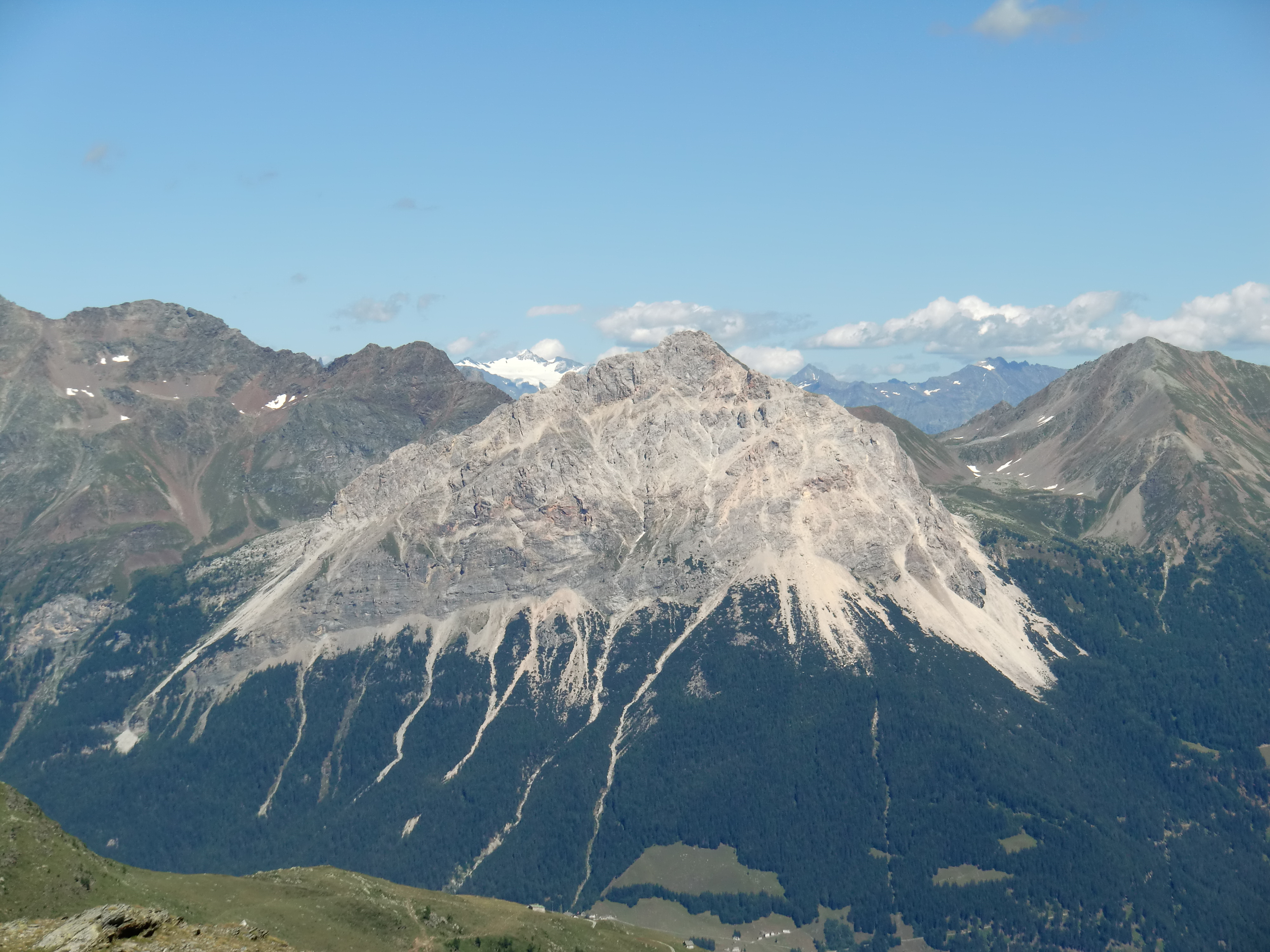
- Sassalb (centre) and Piz di Sassiglion (right)

Highest point
- Elevation: 2,855 m (9,367 ft)
- Prominence: 313 m (1,027 ft)
- Parent peak: Cima Viola
- Coordinates: 46°19′22″N 10°6′46″E

Geography
- Location within Alps
- Location: Graubünden, Switzerland; Lombardy, Italy
- Parent range: Livigno Alps

Piz di Sassiglion (2,855 m) is a mountain of the Livigno Alps, located on the border between Switzerland and Italy. It is the highest summit of the chain south of the Passo di Malghera. The mountain lies east of Poschiavo (Graubünden) and west of the Val Grosina (Lombardy).
