= Piz Serra =

Mountain in Switzerland

- Location within Alps

Highest point
- Elevation: 3,095 m (10,154 ft)
- Prominence: 238 m (781 ft)
- Parent peak: Piz Quattervals
- Coordinates: 46°36′39″N 10°06′20″E

Geography
- Location: Lombardy, Italy/Graubünden, Switzerland
- Parent range: Livigno Alps

Piz Serra is a mountain of the Livigno Alps, located on the border between Italy and Switzerland. The northern side of the mountain (Graubünden) is part of the Swiss National Park. The southern side of the mountain (Lombardy) is part of the Stelvio National Park.
