= Piz Albris =

Mountain in Switzerland

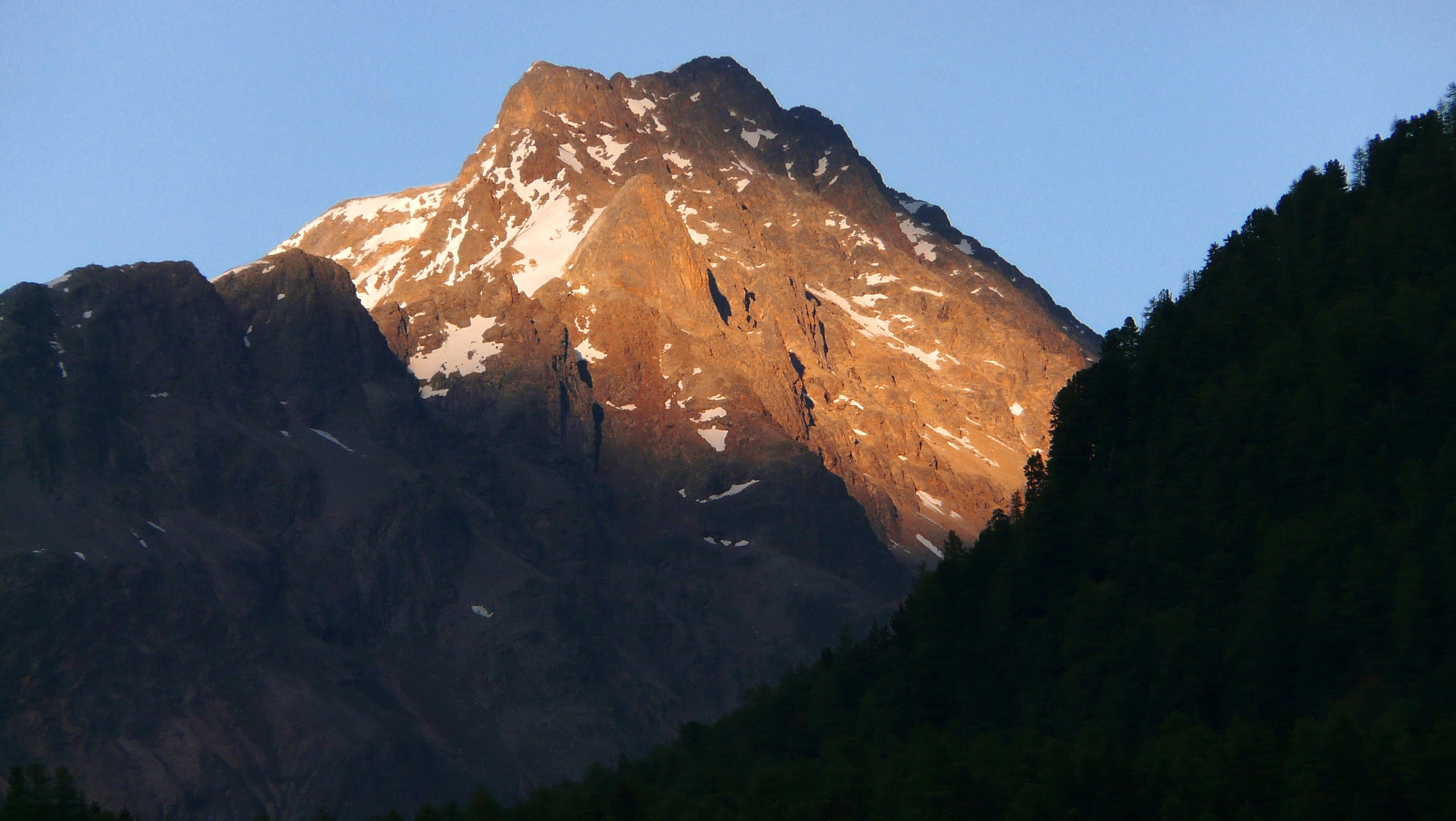
- View from St. Moritz (west side)

Highest point
- Elevation: 3,166 m (10,387 ft)
- Prominence: 318 m (1,043 ft)
- Parent peak: Piz Languard
- Listing: Alpine mountains above 3000 m
- Coordinates: 46°27′50″N 9°57′49″E

Geography
- Location within Switzerland
- Location: Graubünden, Switzerland
- Parent range: Livigno Alps

Piz Albris is a mountain in the Livigno Alps of the Swiss Alps. It is located in the canton of Graubünden. Its 3,166-metre-high (10,387 ft) summit overlooks the Val Bernina.

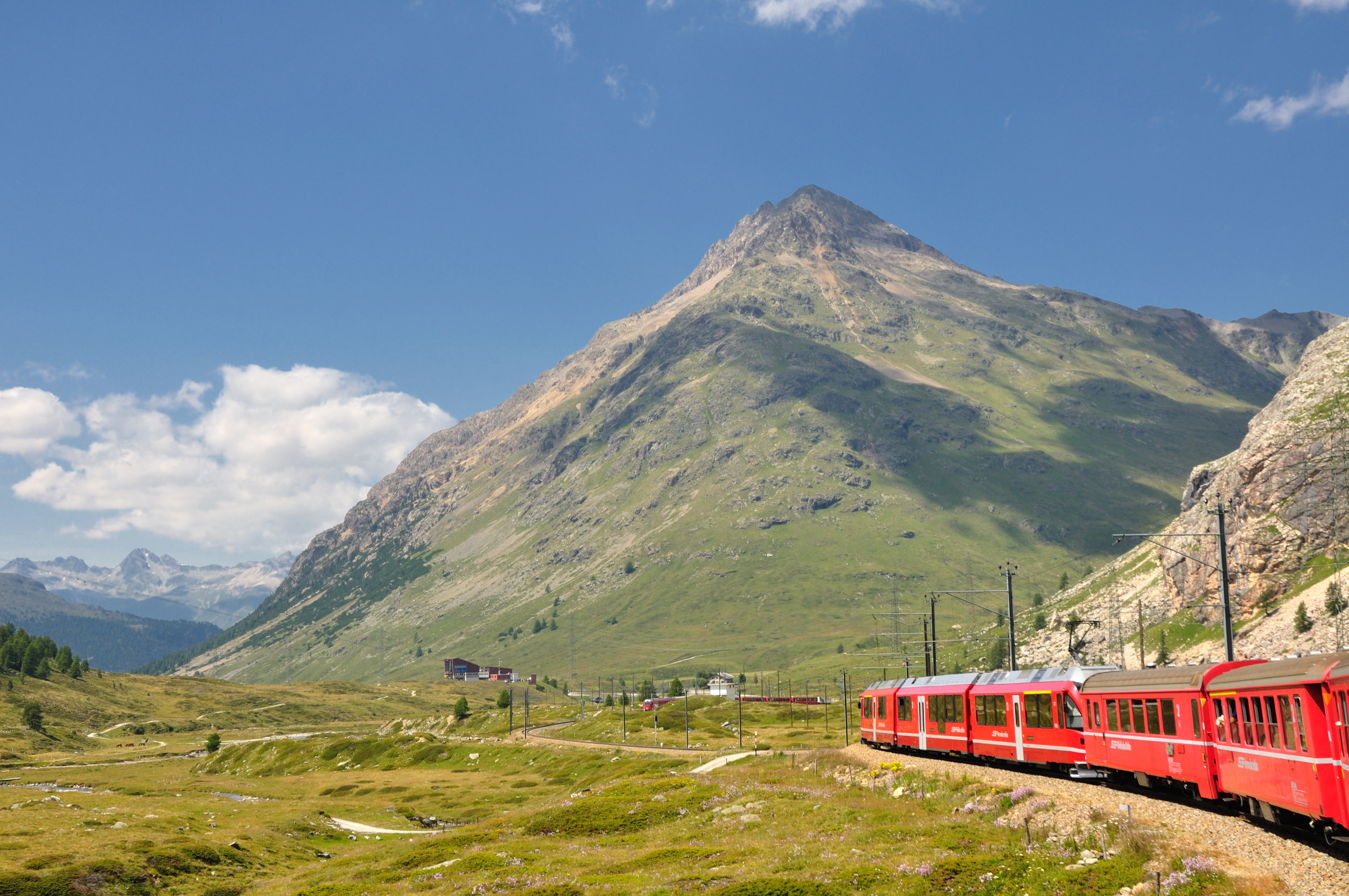
View from the Bernina Railway (south side)
