= Sassalb =

Mountain in Switzerland

- Sassalbo
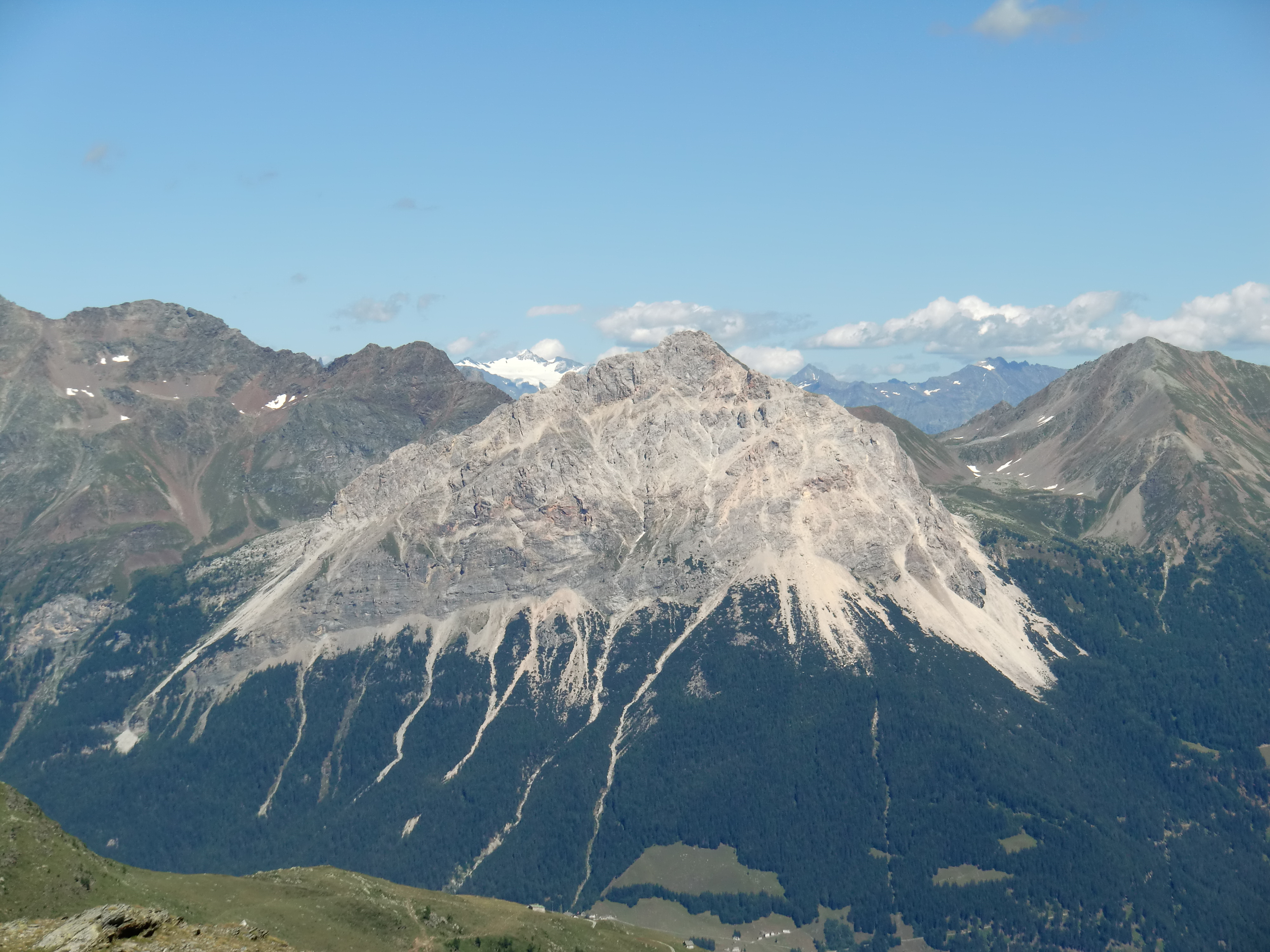
- West side

Highest point
- Elevation: 2,862 m (9,390 ft)
- Prominence: 190 m (620 ft)
- Parent peak: Cima Viola
- Coordinates: 46°20′2″N 10°5′56.4″E

Geography
- Location within Switzerland
- Location: Graubünden, Switzerland (mountain partially in Italy)
- Parent range: Livigno Alps

The Sassalb (also known as Sassalbo) is a mountain of the Livigno Alps, located in Graubünden, Switzerland. The mountain overlooks Poschiavo. The Sassalb lies south of Piz Sena. The border with Italy runs approximately 400 metres east of the summit.
