= Piz dal Diavel =

Mountain in Switzerland

- Location within Switzerland

Highest point
- Elevation: 3,062 m (10,046 ft)
- Prominence: 176 m (577 ft)
- Parent peak: Piz da l'Acqua
- Coordinates: 46°37′20.8″N 10°8′21″E

Geography
- Location: Graubünden, Switzerland
- Parent range: Livigno Alps

Piz dal Diavel is a mountain of the Livigno Alps, located in Graubünden, Switzerland. It is part of the Swiss National Park.
