= Piz Saliente =

Mountain in Italy

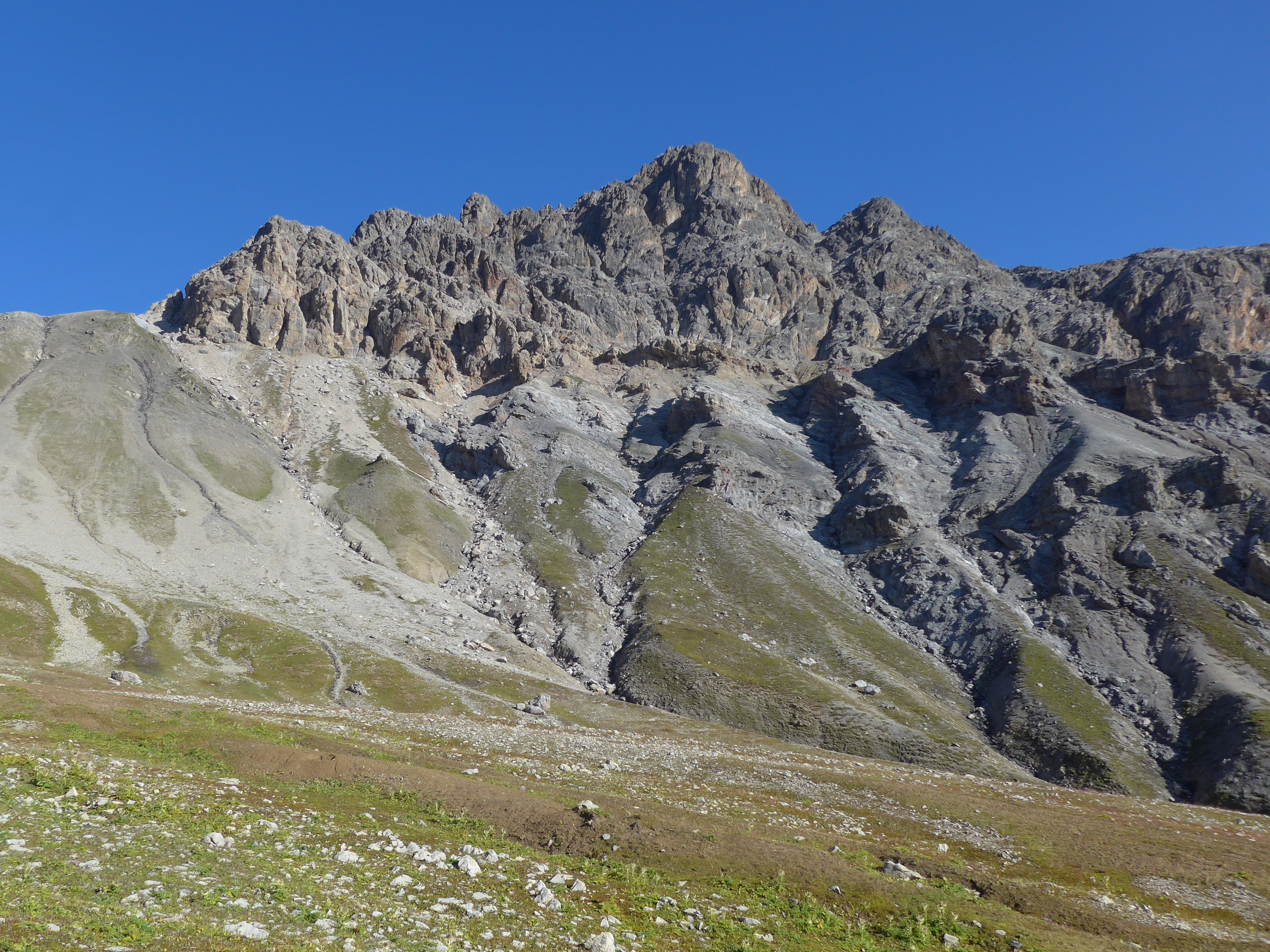
- Piz Saliente from south

Highest point
- Elevation: 3,048 m (10,000 ft)
- Prominence: 186 m (610 ft)
- Parent peak: Piz Serra
- Coordinates: 46°35′06″N 10°06′06″E

Geography
- Location within Alps
- Location: Lombardy, Italy (near the Swiss border)
- Parent range: Livigno Alps

Piz Saliente is a mountain of the Livigno Alps. Its 3,048-metre-high (10,000 ft) summit is located near the border between Italy and Switzerland. The western side of the massif (Graubünden) is part of the Swiss National Park. The eastern side of the massif (Lombardy) is part of the Stelvio National Park.
