= Corno di Dosdè =

Mountain in Italy

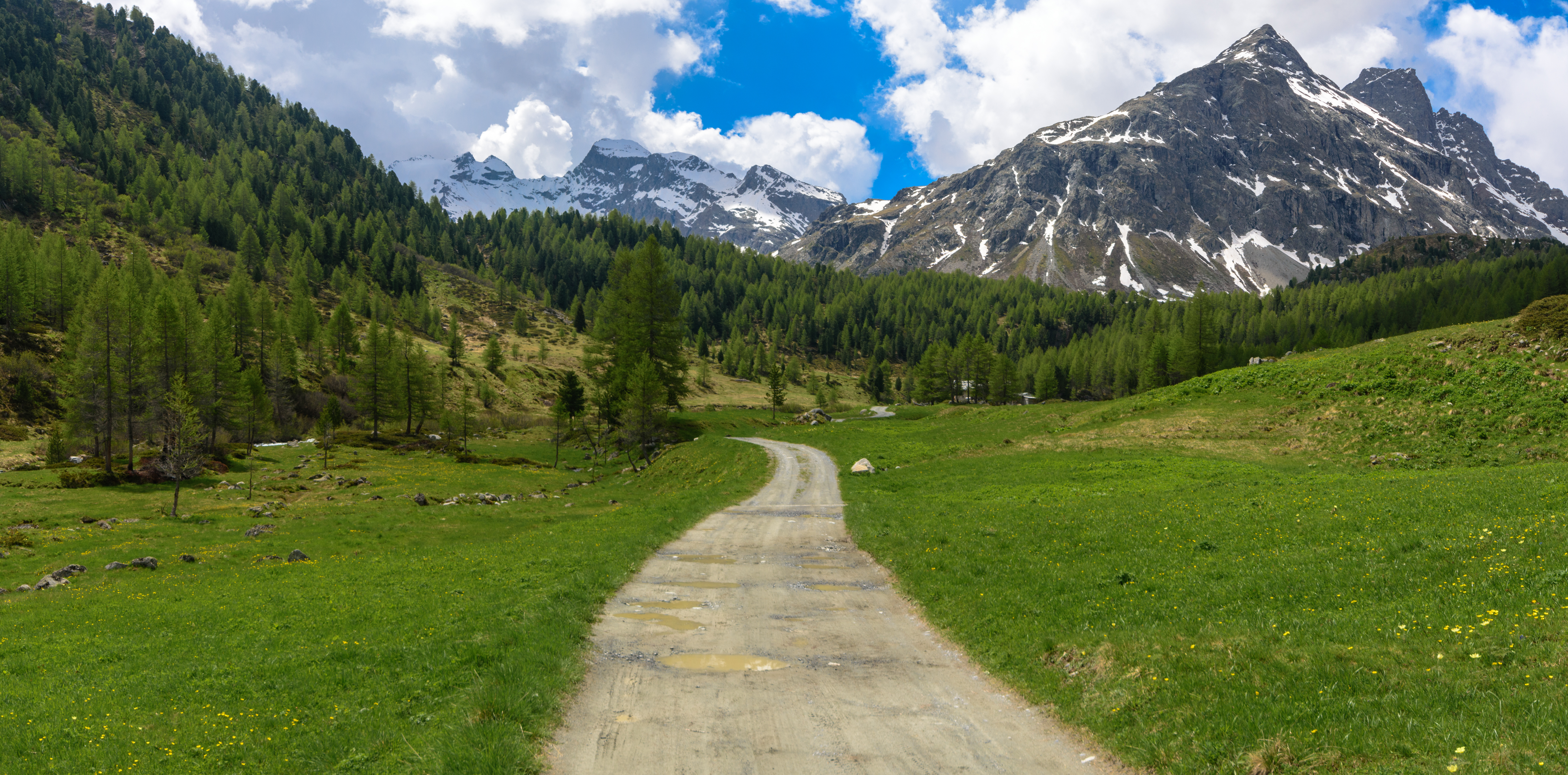
- View from Val Viola, Cima Viola (left) and Corno di Dosdè (far right)

Highest point
- Elevation: 3,232 m (10,604 ft)
- Prominence: 302 m (991 ft)
- Parent peak: Scima da Saoseo
- Listing: Alpine mountains above 3000 m
- Coordinates: 46°24′27″N 10°10′09″E

Geography
- Location within Alps
- Location: Lombardy, Italy (mountain partially in Switzerland)
- Parent range: Livigno Alps

The Corno di Dosdè (3,232 m) is a mountain of the Livigno Alps, located south-west of Valdidentro in the Italian region of Lombardy. On its east side the mountain overlooks the Swiss valley of Poschiavo, the international border running on a secondary summit (3,162 m) west of the main summit.
