= Cima Redasco =

Mountain in Italy

- Cime di Redasco
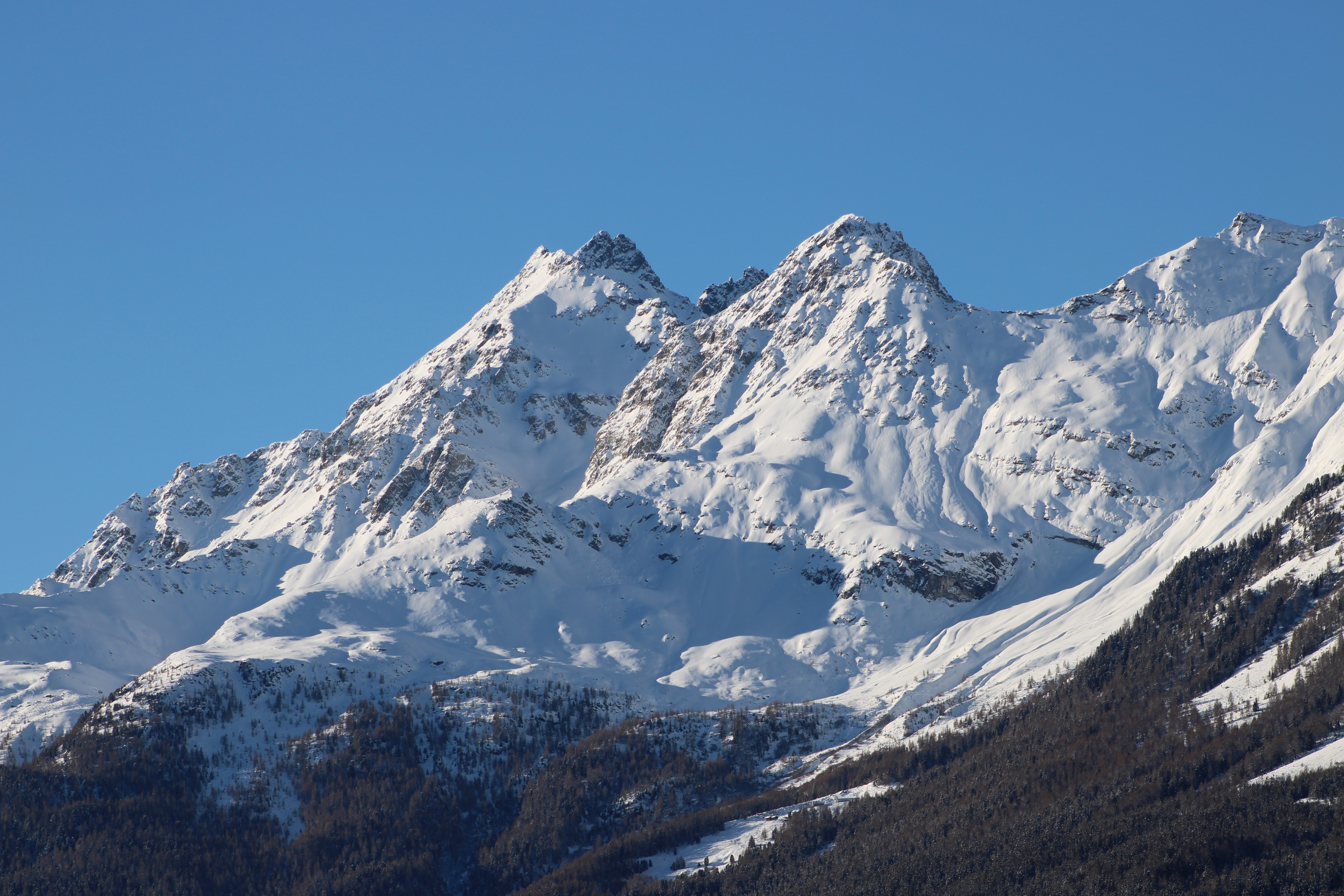
- Northeast aspect

Highest point
- Elevation: 3,139 m (10,299 ft)
- Prominence: 389 m (1,276 ft)
- Parent peak: Cima Piazzi
- Isolation: 4.26 km (2.65 mi)
- Listing: Alps above 3000 m
- Coordinates: 46°22′10″N 10°18′29″E

Geography
- Location within Alps Location within Italy
- Interactive map of Cima Redasco
- Country: Italy
- Province: Sondrio
- Region: Lombardy
- Parent range: Alps; Western Rhaetian Alps; Livigno Alps

Climbing
- First ascent: 1896

Cima Redasco, also known as Cime di Redasco, is a mountain in the Lombardy region of Italy.

== Description ==
Cima Redasco is a 3,139-metre-elevation (10,299-foot) double summit in the Livigno Alps of the Alps. The mountain is located four kilometres (2.5 mi) north of the municipality of Sondalo. Precipitation runoff from the mountain drains into tributaries of the Adda River. Topographic relief is significant as the summit rises 2,180 metres (7,152 feet) above the Adda Valley in 3.5 kilometres (2.2 miles). The first ascent of the east summit, Punta Maria (3,139 m), was achieved on 14 August 1896 by Giuseppe Krapacher, Pietro Rinaldi, and Giorgio Sinigaglia via the northeast ridge. The lower west summit, Punta Elsa (3,095 m), was first climbed on 18 September 1896 by Antonio Facetti, Giuseppe Ongania, and Enrico Schenatti via the east ridge. The nearest higher neighbor is Pizzo Campaccio, 4.26 km (2.65 mi) to the northwest.

== Climate ==
According to the Köppen climate classification system, Cima Redasco is located in an alpine climate zone. Weather fronts are forced upward by the Alps (orographic lift), causing moisture to drop in the form of rain or snowfall onto the range.

== See also ==
- Climate of the Alps
