= Piz Lavirun =

Mountain in Switzerland

- Pizzo Leverone
- Location within Alps

Highest point
- Elevation: 3,058 m (10,033 ft)
- Prominence: 216 m (709 ft)
- Parent peak: Munt Cotschen
- Coordinates: 46°31′41.9″N 10°03′02.5″E

Geography
- Location: Graubünden, Switzerland; Lombardy, Italy
- Parent range: Livigno Range

Piz Lavirun (also known as Pizzo Leverone) is a mountain in the Livigno Range of the Alps, located on the border between Italy and Switzerland. It lies between the Val Lavirun (Graubünden) and the Valle di Federia (Lombardy).
