= Piz Lagalb =

Mountain in Switzerland

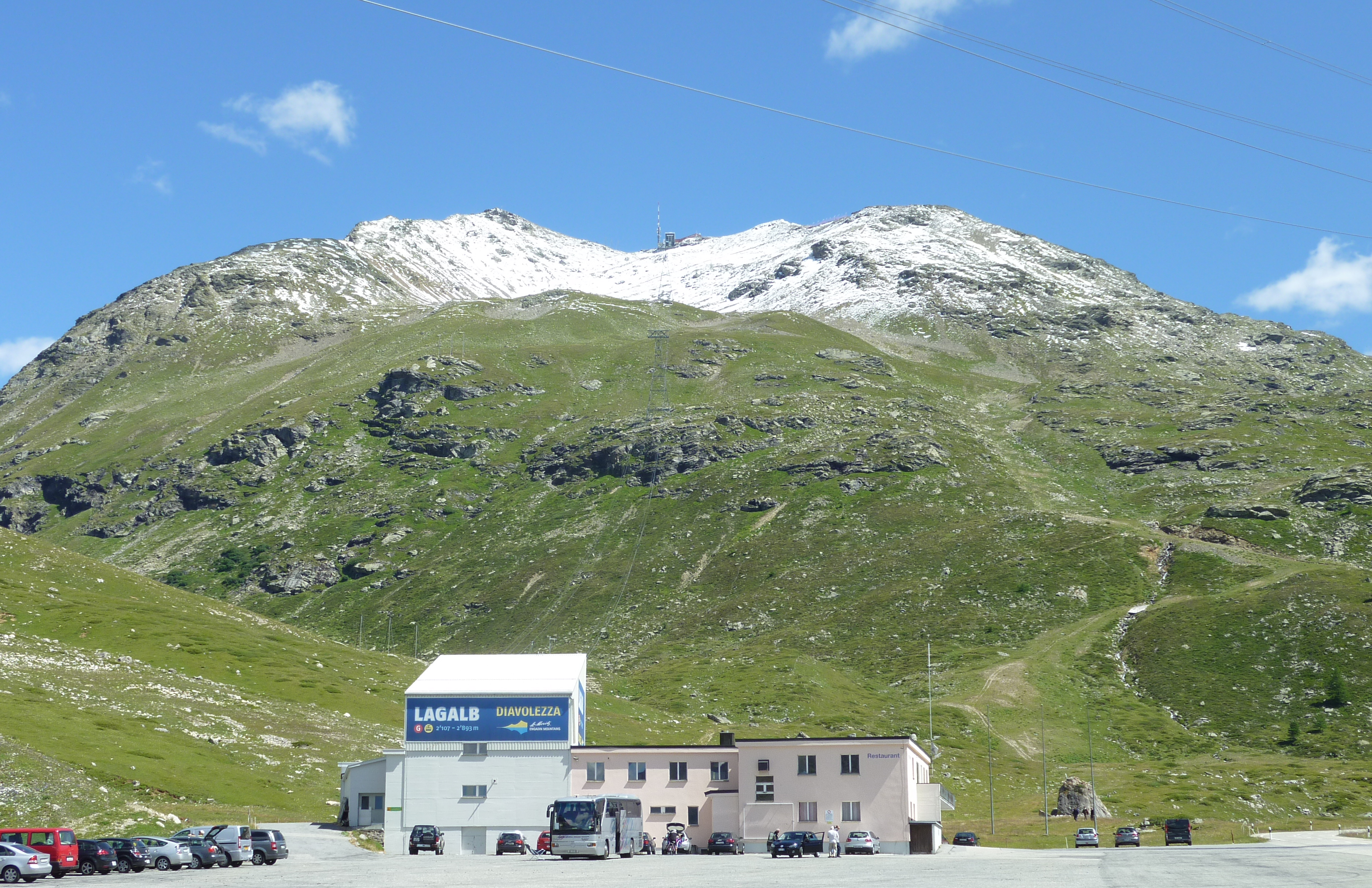
- View from Bernina Lagalb

Highest point
- Elevation: 2,959 m (9,708 ft)
- Prominence: 524 m (1,719 ft)
- Parent peak: Piz Languard
- Coordinates: 46°25′53.5″N 10°01′24.9″E

Geography
- Location within Switzerland
- Location: Graubünden, Switzerland
- Parent range: Livigno Alps

Climbing
- Easiest route: Aerial tramway

Piz Lagalb is a mountain of the Livigno Alps, overlooking the Bernina Pass in the canton of located in Graubünden. In winter it serves as a ski area.

== See also ==
- List of mountains of the Alps
- List of mountains of Switzerland accessible by public transport
