= Scima da Saoseo =

Mountain in Switzerland

- Cima di Saoseo
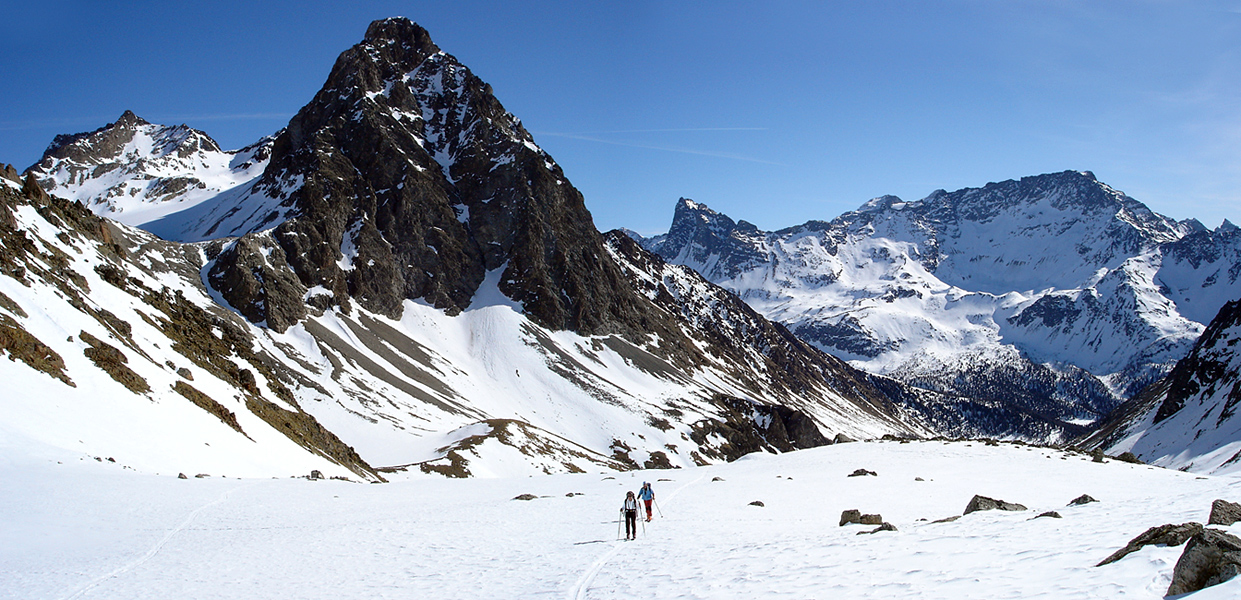
- Corn da Camp (left) and Scima da Saoseo (right)

Highest point
- Elevation: 3,264 m (10,709 ft)
- Prominence: 440 m (1,440 ft)
- Parent peak: Cima Viola
- Listing: Alpine mountains above 3000 m
- Coordinates: 46°23′8″N 10°09′28.6″E

Geography
- Location within Alps
- Location: Lombardy, Italy/Graubünden, Switzerland
- Parent range: Livigno Alps
- Topo map: 1278 La Rösa

The Scima da Saoseo (also known as Cima di Saoseo) is a mountain of the Livigno Alps, located on the border between Italy and Switzerland. It lies west of Cima Viola. On its west (Swiss) side it overlooks Lago di Saoseo.
