= Piz da l'Acqua =

Mountain in Switzerland

- Location within Alps

Highest point
- Elevation: 3,126 m (10,256 ft)
- Prominence: 318 m (1,043 ft)
- Parent peak: Piz Quattervals
- Listing: Alpine mountains above 3000 m
- Coordinates: 46°36′38.5″N 10°8′14.5″E

Geography
- Location: Lombardy, Italy; Graubünden, Switzerland
- Parent range: Livigno Alps

Piz da l'Acqua is a mountain of the Livigno Alps, located on the border between Italy and Switzerland. The northern side of the mountain (Graubünden) is part of the Swiss National Park. The southern side of the mountain (Lombardy) is part of the Stelvio National Park. The mountain overlooks the Lago di Livigno on its eastern side.
