= Piz Mezzaun =

Mountain in Switzerland

- Piz Mezzaun as seen from the Engadin

Highest point
- Elevation: 3,000 m (9,800 ft)
- Prominence: 216 m (709 ft)
- Parent peak: Munt Cotschen
- Coordinates: 46°34′00″N 9°58′46″E

Geography
- Location within Switzerland
- Location: Graubünden, Switzerland
- Parent range: Livigno Range

Piz Mezzaun (western summit: 2,963 m, 9,721 ft; eastern summit: 3,000 m, 9,800 ft) is a mountain in the Livigno Range of the Alps, located east of La Punt Chamues-ch in the canton of Graubünden. It lies on the range north of the Chamuera valley.
