= Piz dal Teo =

Mountain in Switzerland

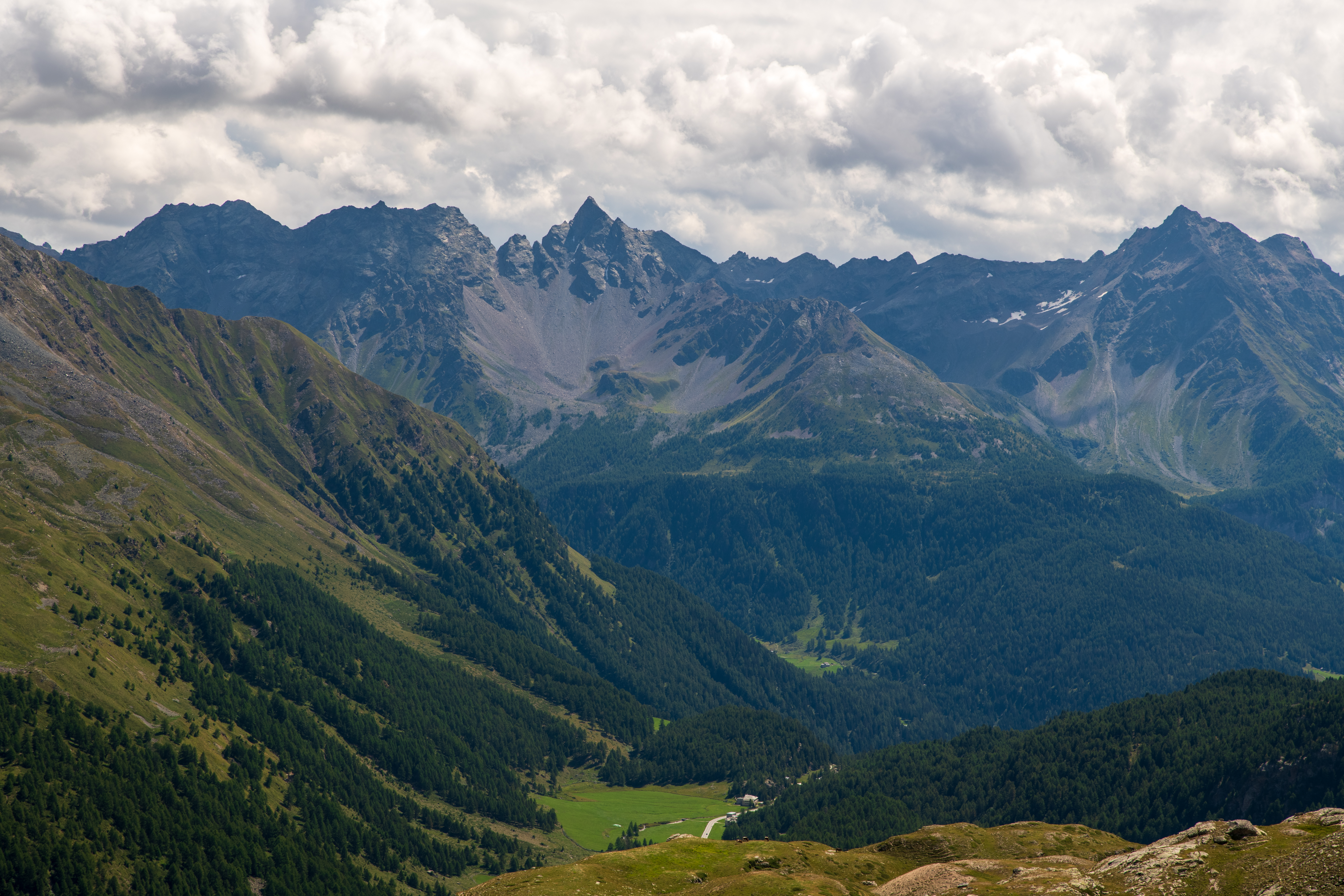
- Piz dal Teo is just left of center

Highest point
- Elevation: 3,049 m (10,003 ft)
- Prominence: 223 m (732 ft)
- Parent peak: Piz Sena
- Coordinates: 46°22′11″N 10°07′34″E

Geography
- Location within Alps
- Location: Lombardy, Italy/Graubünden, Switzerland
- Parent range: Poschiavo

Piz dal Teo is a mountain in Poschiavo, located on the border between Italy and Switzerland. It lies south of Scima da Saoseo.
