= Piz Chaschauna =

Mountain in Switzerland

- Piz Casana
- Location within Alps

Highest point
- Elevation: 3,071 m (10,075 ft)
- Prominence: 289 m (948 ft)
- Parent peak: Piz Quattervals
- Coordinates: 46°34′31″N 10°04′43″E

Geography
- Location: Lombardy, Italy/Graubünden, Switzerland
- Parent range: Livigno Alps

Piz Chaschauna (also known as Piz Casana) is a mountain of the Livigno Alps, located on the border between Italy and Switzerland. The northern side of the mountain (Graubünden) is part of the Swiss National Park. The eastern side of the mountain (Lombardy) is part of the Stelvio National Park.
