= Piz Paradisin =

Mountain in Switzerland

- Pizzo Paradisino
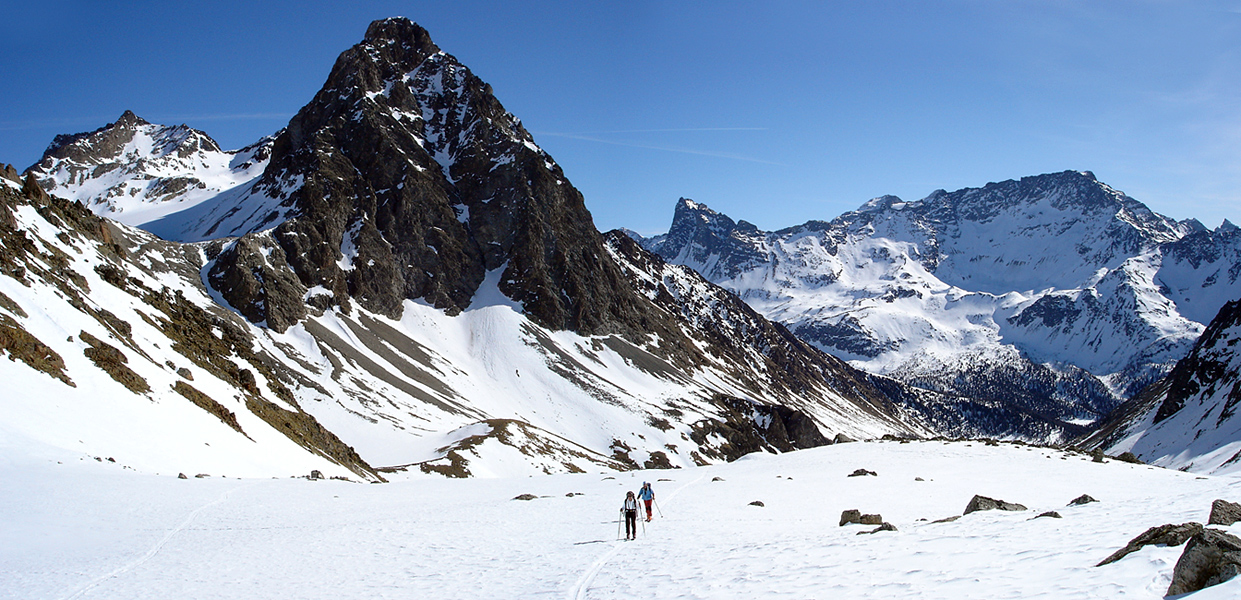
- Piz Paradisin (far left) and Corn da Camp (left) from the west side

Highest point
- Elevation: 3,302 m (10,833 ft)
- Prominence: 875 m (2,871 ft)
- Parent peak: Cima Viola
- Listing: Alpine mountains above 3000 m
- Coordinates: 46°25′34″N 10°07′02″E

Geography
- Location within Alps
- Location: Lombardy, Italy/Graubünden, Switzerland
- Parent range: Livigno Alps

Piz Paradisin (also known as Pizzo Paradisino) is a mountain of the Livigno Alps, located on the border between Italy and Switzerland. With an elevation of 3,302 metres (10,833 ft) above sea level, it is the third highest mountain of the Livigno Alps. On its west side lies a glacier named Vadreit da Camp.
