= Piz Trevisina =

Mountain in Switzerland

- Location within Alps

Highest point
- Elevation: 2,823 m (9,262 ft)
- Prominence: 195 m (640 ft)
- Parent peak: Cima da li Gandi Rossi
- Coordinates: 46°18′04″N 10°08′17″E

Geography
- Location: Graubünden, Switzerland; Lombardy, Italy
- Parent range: Livigno Range

Piz Trevisina is a mountain of the Livigno Alps, located on the border between Italy and Switzerland. It lies on the range between the Val Poschiavo (Graubünden) and the Val Grosina (Lombardy).
