= Piz Val Nera =

Mountain in Italy

- Monte Val Nera
- Location within Alps

Highest point
- Elevation: 3,188 m (10,459 ft)
- Prominence: 197 m (646 ft)
- Parent peak: Piz Paradisin
- Coordinates: 46°26′00″N 10°07′55″E

Geography
- Location: Lombardy, Italy (mountain partially in Switzerland)
- Parent range: Livigno Alps

Piz Val Nera (or Monte Val Nera) is a mountain of the Livigno Alps, located between the Italian region of Lombardy and the Swiss canton of Graubünden. Its summit is 3,188 metre-high and lies within Italy, 200 metres north of the border with Switzerland (3,160 m).
