= Lago di Val Viola =

Lake in the Grisons, Switzerland

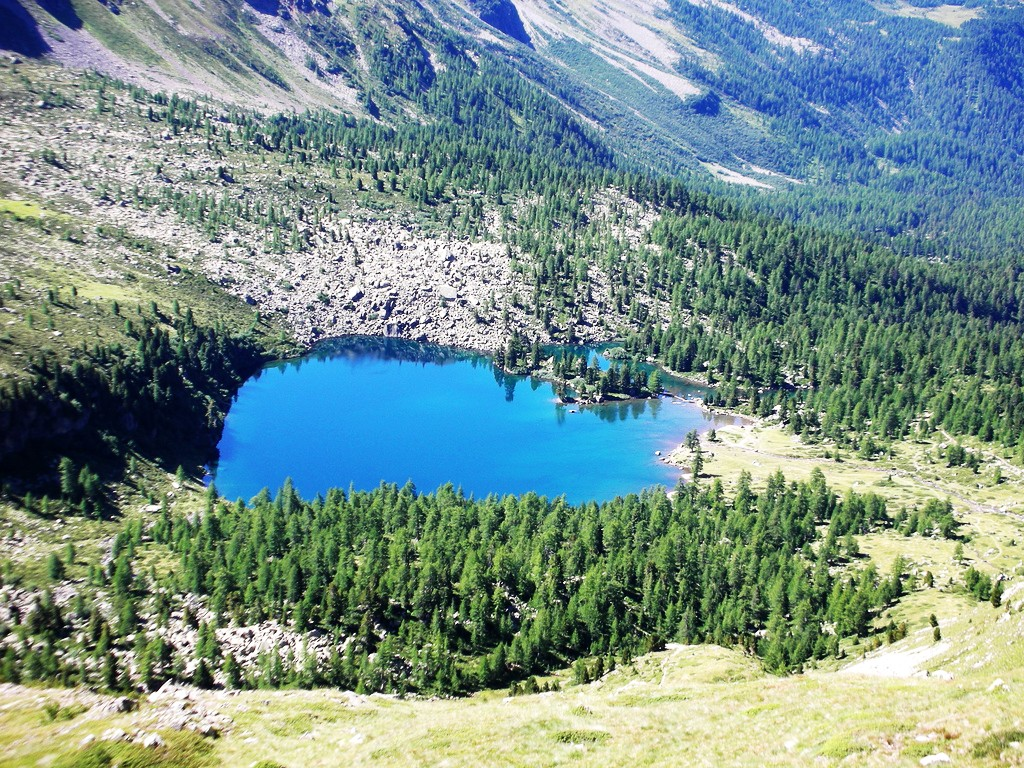

- Location within Canton of Graubünden Location within Switzerland Location within Italy Location within Alps
- Interactive map of Lago di Val Viola
- Location: Grisons
- Coordinates: 46°24′15″N 10°08′20″E
- Basin countries: Switzerland
- Surface area: 8 ha (20 acres)
- Max. depth: 13.2 m (43 ft)
- Surface elevation: 2,159 m (7,083 ft)

Lago di Val Viola (Lagh da Val Viola) is a lake in the Grisons, Switzerland. The lake is located near Lago di Saoseo, in the Poschiavo region.

== See also ==
- List of mountain lakes of Switzerland
