= Corn da Camp =

Mountain in Switzerland

- Corno di Campo
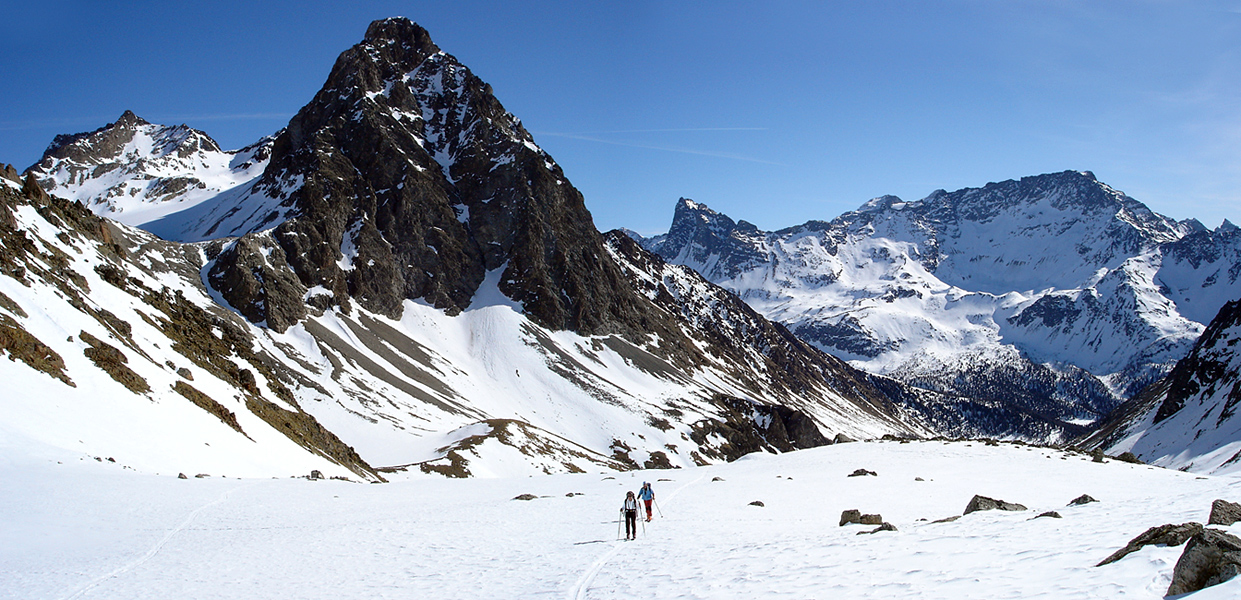
- Corn da Camp (left) from the west side

Highest point
- Elevation: 3,232 m (10,604 ft)
- Prominence: 201 m (659 ft)
- Parent peak: Piz Paradisin
- Coordinates: 46°25′3.8″N 10°6′27.6″E

Geography
- Location within Switzerland
- Location: Graubünden, Switzerland
- Parent range: Livigno Alps

The Corn da Camp (also known as Corno di Campo) is a mountain of the Livigno Alps, located in Graubünden, Switzerland. On its northern side lies a glacier named Vedreit da Camp.
