= Lago di Saoseo =

Lake in the Grisons, Switzerland

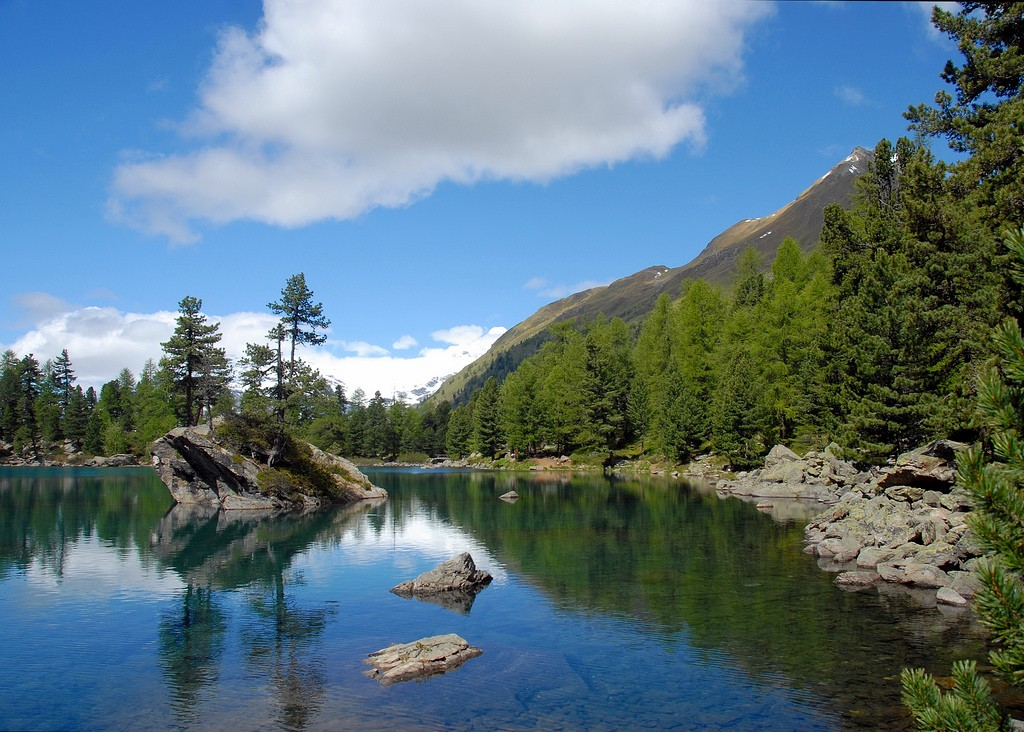

- Location within Canton of Graubünden Location within Switzerland Location within Italy Location within Alps
- Interactive map of Lago di Saoseo
- Location: Poschiavo, Grisons
- Coordinates: 46.398°N 10.126°E
- Basin countries: Switzerland
- Max. length: 570 m (1,870 ft)
- Max. width: 550 m (1,800 ft)
- Surface area: 2.5 ha (6.2 acres)
- Max. depth: 17 m (56 ft)
- Surface elevation: 2,028 m (6,654 ft)

Lago di Saoseo (Lagh da Saoseo) is a lake in the Val da Camp, a valley in the Poschiavo region of the Grisons, Switzerland.

Due to its intense blue color and picturesque surrounding nature, it is considered one of the most beautiful mountain lakes in Switzerland.

== Access ==
The lake can only be reached on foot on hiking trails. A circular trail leads from Alp Camp (accessible in summer by minibus, closed to individual traffic without a permit) in about two hours to Lagh da Saoseo and the slightly higher Lagh da Val Viola. From Sfazù on the Bernina Pass road, a circular hike of about five hours leads to the two lakes.

The mountain hut Rifugio Saoseo is located near the lake.
