= Piz Sena =

Mountain in Switzerland

- Vetta Sperella
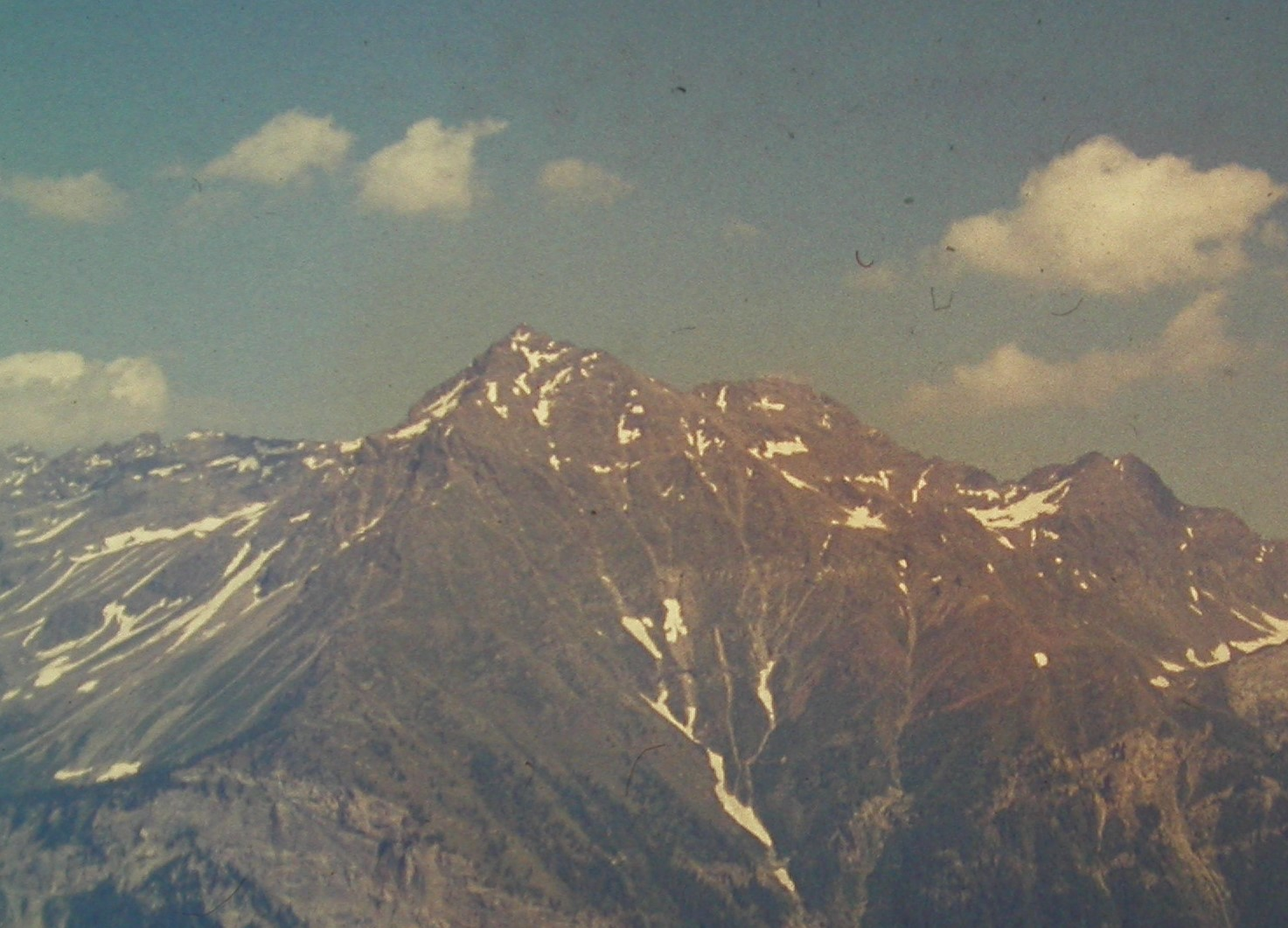
- Piz Sena seen from Alp Grüm in 1962

Highest point
- Elevation: 3,075 m (10,089 ft)
- Prominence: 344 m (1,129 ft)
- Parent peak: Cima Viola
- Listing: Alpine mountains above 3000 m
- Coordinates: 46°21′12″N 10°06′35″E

Geography
- Location within Alps
- Location: Lombardy, Italy/Graubünden, Switzerland
- Parent range: Livigno Alps

Piz Sena (also known as Vetta Sperella) is a mountain of the Livigno Alps, located on the border between Italy and Switzerland. On its (Swiss) western side it overlooks Poschiavo.
