= Munt Cotschen =

Mountain in Switzerland

- Location within Alps

Highest point
- Elevation: 3,104 m (10,184 ft)
- Prominence: 314 m (1,030 ft)
- Parent peak: Piz Languard
- Coordinates: 46°30′36″N 10°02′33″E

Geography
- Location: Lombardy, Italy/ Graubünden, Switzerland
- Parent range: Livigno Alps

Munt Cotschen is a mountain of the Livigno Alps, located on the border between Italy and Switzerland. It lies on the range lying between the Val Chamuera (above Chamues-ch in Graubünden) and the Livigno valley (Lombardy).
