= Piz Quattervals =

Mountain in Switzerland

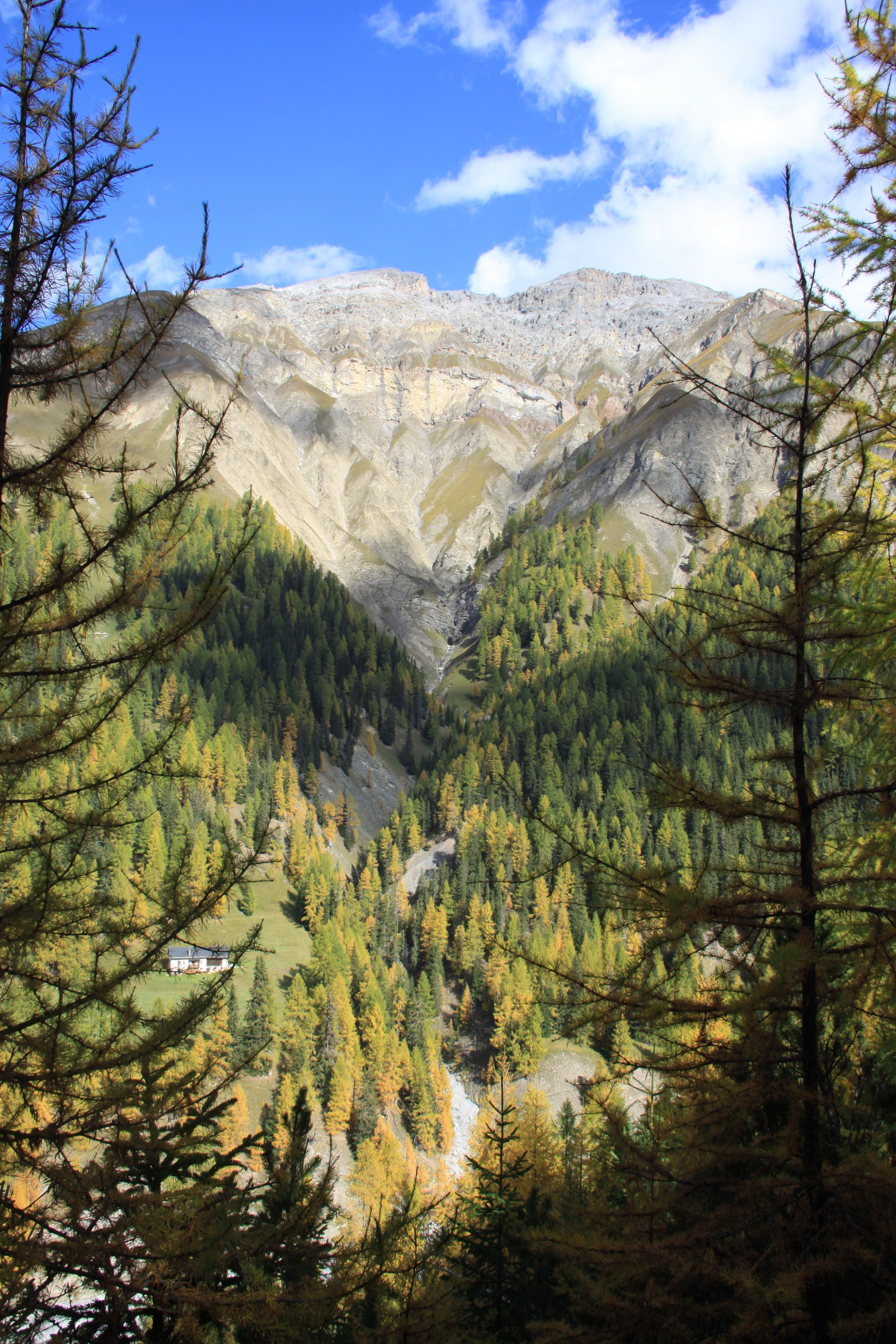

Highest point
- Elevation: 3,165 m (10,384 ft)
- Prominence: 471 m (1,545 ft)
- Parent peak: Piz Languard
- Isolation: 10.4 km (6.5 mi)
- Listing: Alpine mountains above 3000 m
- Coordinates: 46°37′37.8″N 10°5′41.7″E

Geography
- Location within Switzerland
- Location: Graubünden, Switzerland
- Parent range: Livigno Alps

Piz Quattervals (Romansh lit. "peak of the four valleys") is a mountain of the Livigno Alps, located in Graubünden, Switzerland. With a height of 3,165 metres above sea level, Piz Quattervals is the highest mountain of the chain north of Pass Chaschauna. Its mass lies between four valleys: Val Tantermozza, Valletta, Val Sassa and Val Müschauns, although its summit lies between the first three mentioned. Piz Quattervals is the highest accessible peak within the Swiss National Park.

== See also ==
- List of mountains of Graubünden
- List of most isolated mountains of Switzerland
