= Cima Piazzi =

Mountain in Italy

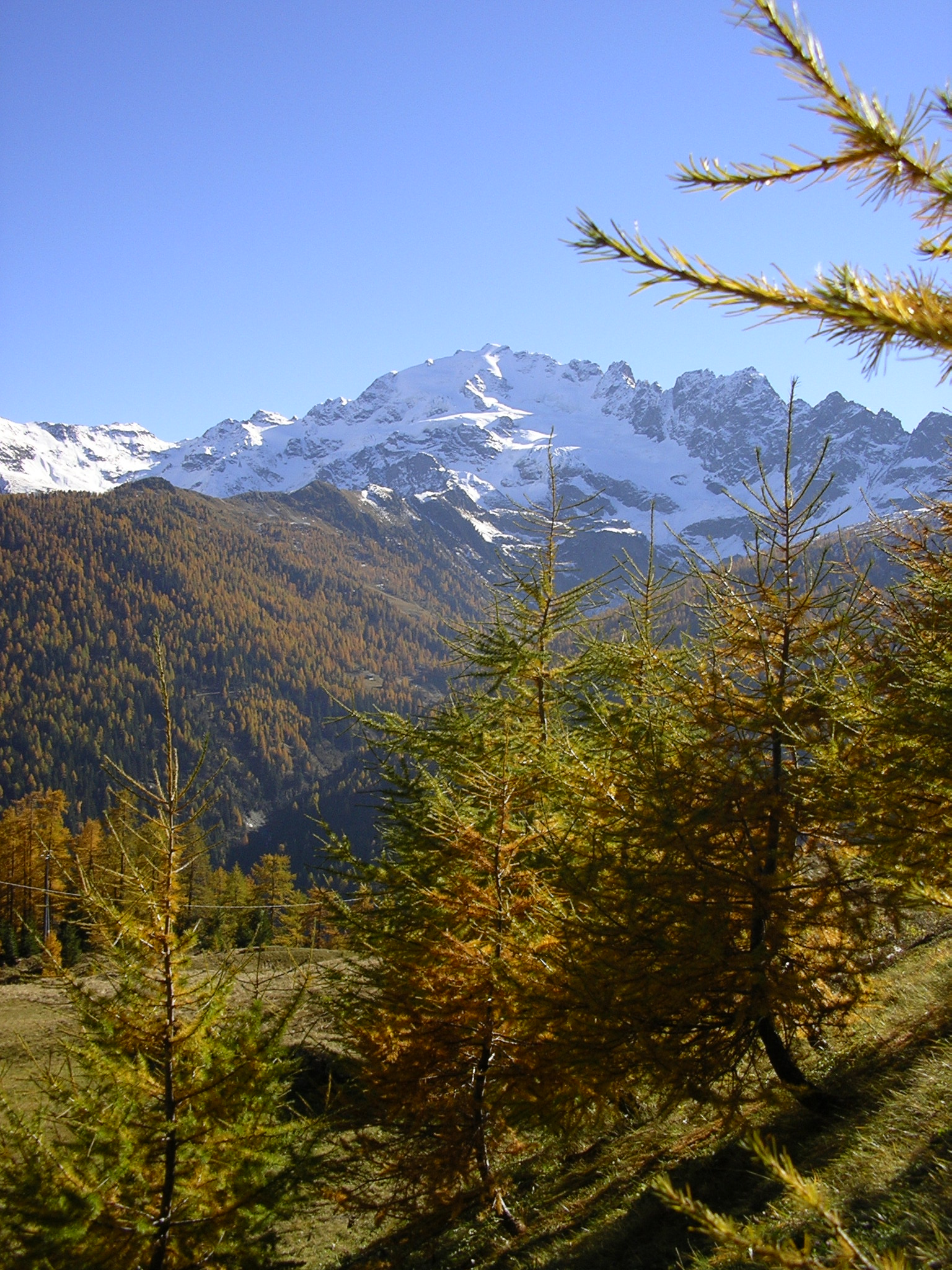
- Cima Piazzi in autumn

Highest point
- Elevation: 3,439 m (11,283 ft)
- Prominence: 1,212 m (3,976 ft)
- Parent peak: Piz Bernina
- Listing: Alpine mountains above 3000 m
- Coordinates: 46°25′00″N 10°17′06″E

Geography
- Location within Alps
- Location: Lombardy, Italy
- Parent range: Livigno Alps

Climbing
- First ascent: 21 August 1867 by Johann Jacob Weilenmann, Franz Poll & Santo Romani

Cima Piazzi, Cima de' Piazzi, del Piazzi or di Piazzi (3,439m) is the highest mountain of the Livigno Alps in Lombardy, Italy. It has a summit elevation of 3,439 m (11,283 ft) above sea level and is located near to the town of Bormio. It has an imposing north face, which is covered with ice, and three long ridges, and is glaciated on all sides.

== See also ==
- List of mountains of the Alps

== Sources ==
- Cima di Piazzi at Summitpost
