= Swiss National Park =

National park in Switzerland

- Parc Naziunal Svizzer
- IUCN category Ia (strict nature reserve)
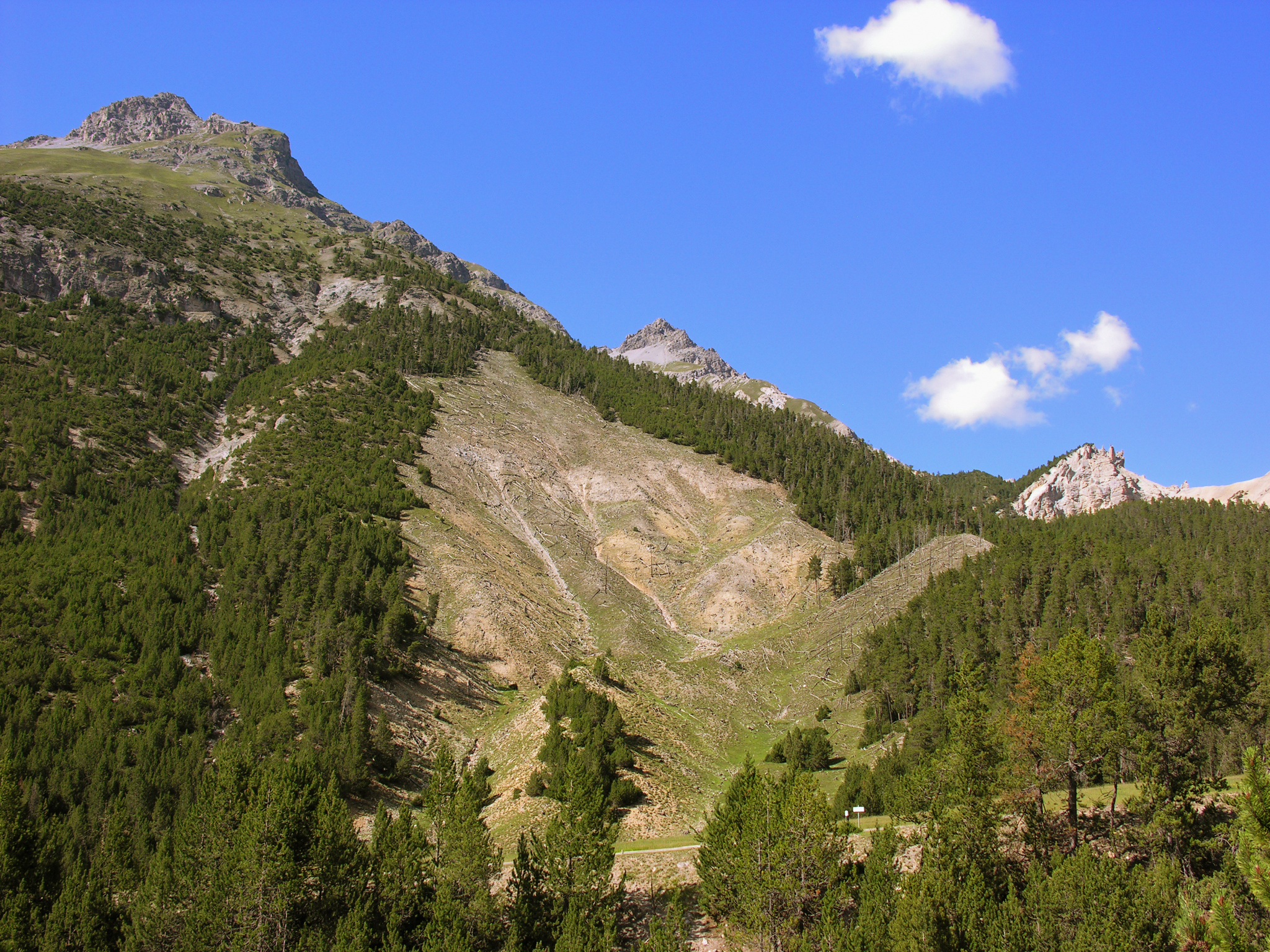

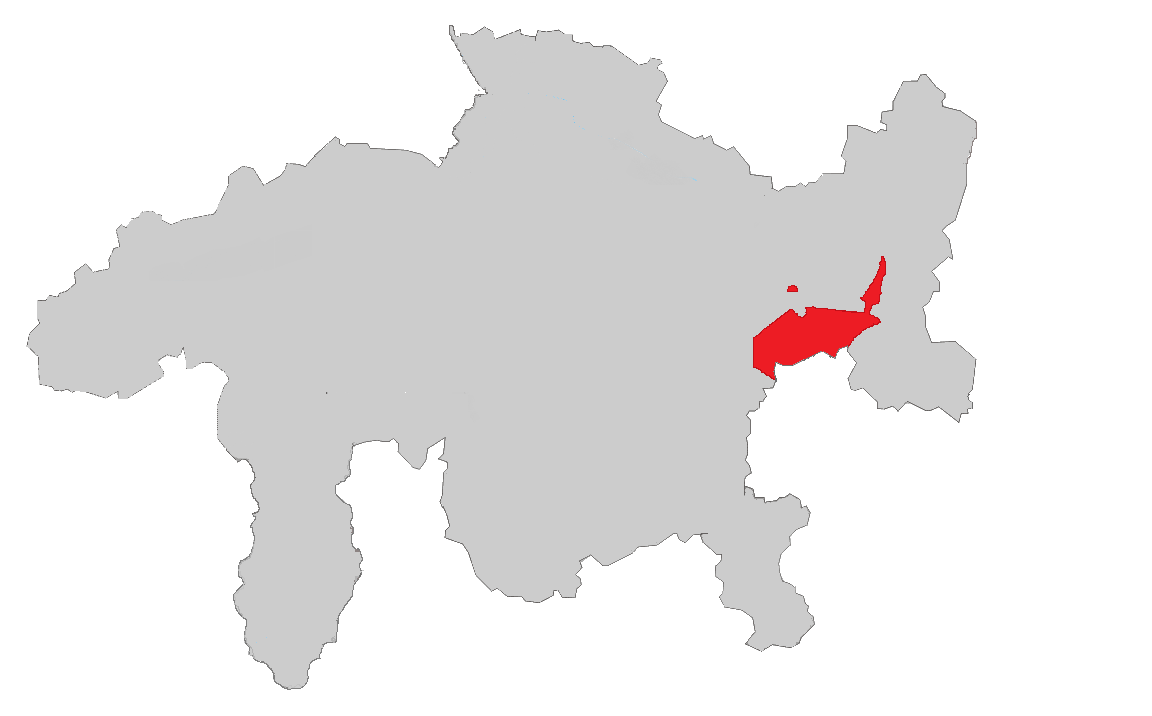
- Location of the Swiss National Park in the canton of Graubünden
- Nearest city: Zernez
- Coordinates: 46°40′N 10°12′E
- Area: 170.3 km^{2} (65.8 sq mi)
- Established: 1 August 1914

The Swiss National Park (Romansh: Parc Naziunal Svizzer; German: Schweizerischer Nationalpark; Italian: Parco Nazionale Svizzero; French: Parc National Suisse) is located in the Western Rhaetian Alps, in eastern Switzerland. It lies within the canton of Graubünden, between Zernez, S-chanf, Scuol, and the Fuorn Pass in the Engadin valley on the border with Italy. Founded in 1914, the Swiss National Park is the oldest national park in the Alps and in Central Europe.

It is part of the worldwide UNESCO Biosphere Reserve and has IUCN category Ia, which is the highest category, signifying a strict nature reserve. Today, the Swiss National Park has an area of 170.3 km^{2} and is the largest nature reserve in Switzerland.

== Description ==
The Swiss National Park covers various terrains, from relatively low valleys to high peaks. The highest peak in the National Park is Piz Quattervals, 3165 m.a.s.l, which can be reached by an alpine hike. As of 2022, this is the only National Park in Switzerland. There are plans to create more. An Adula National Park was planned in the Adula Alps, but in November 2016 the inhabitants voted against it.

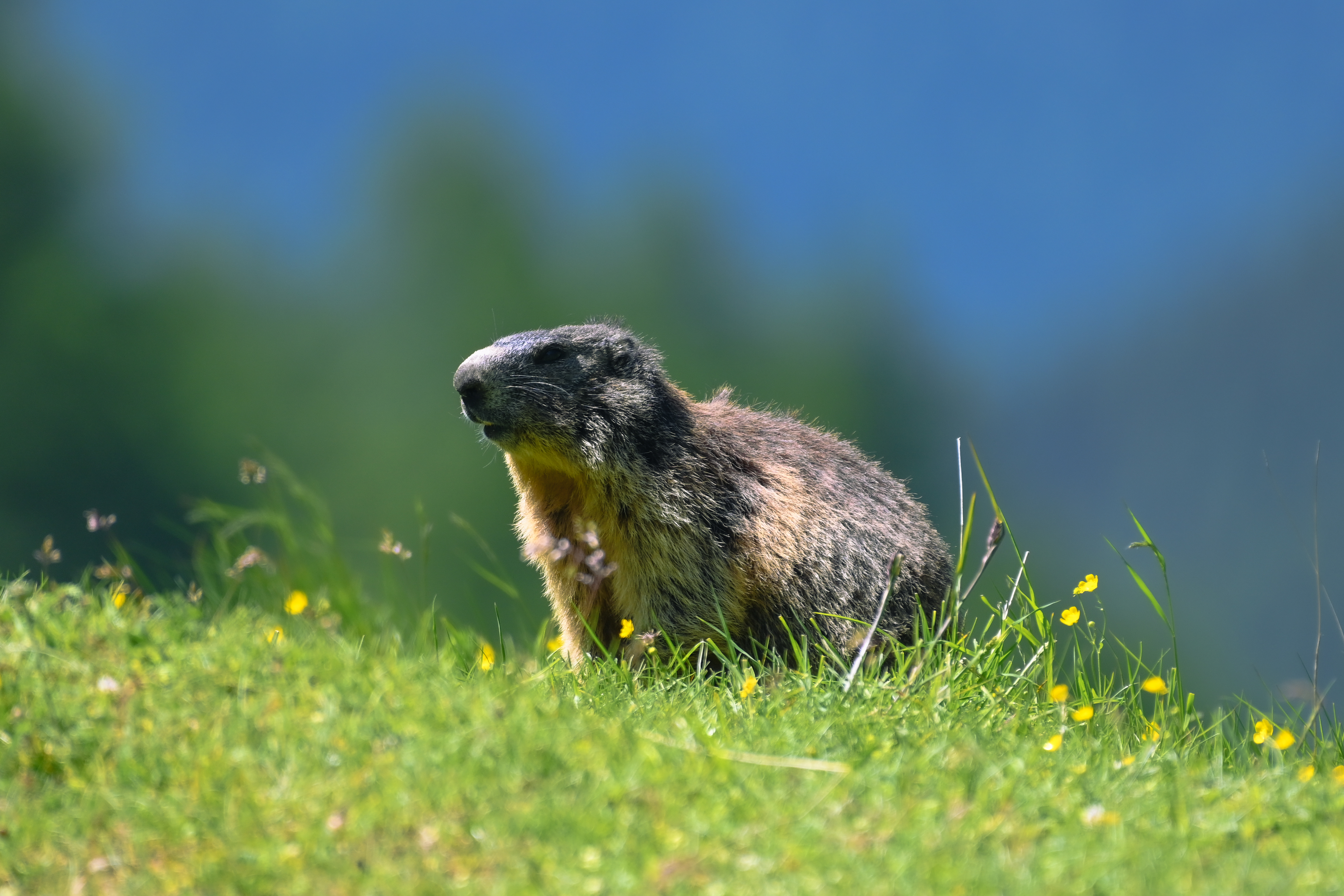
Marmot in Val Trupchun within the Swiss National Park

In the national park, it is forbidden to leave marked paths or to sleep anywhere apart from the Chamanna Cluozza, the mountain hut in the park. Due to this there are over 80 kilometers of marked hiking paths, separated into 21 individual hikes of various distances and difficulties. Dogs are not allowed, even on a leash. Due to these strict rules, the Swiss National Park is the only park in the Alps which has been categorized by the IUCN as a strict nature reserve, the highest protection level.

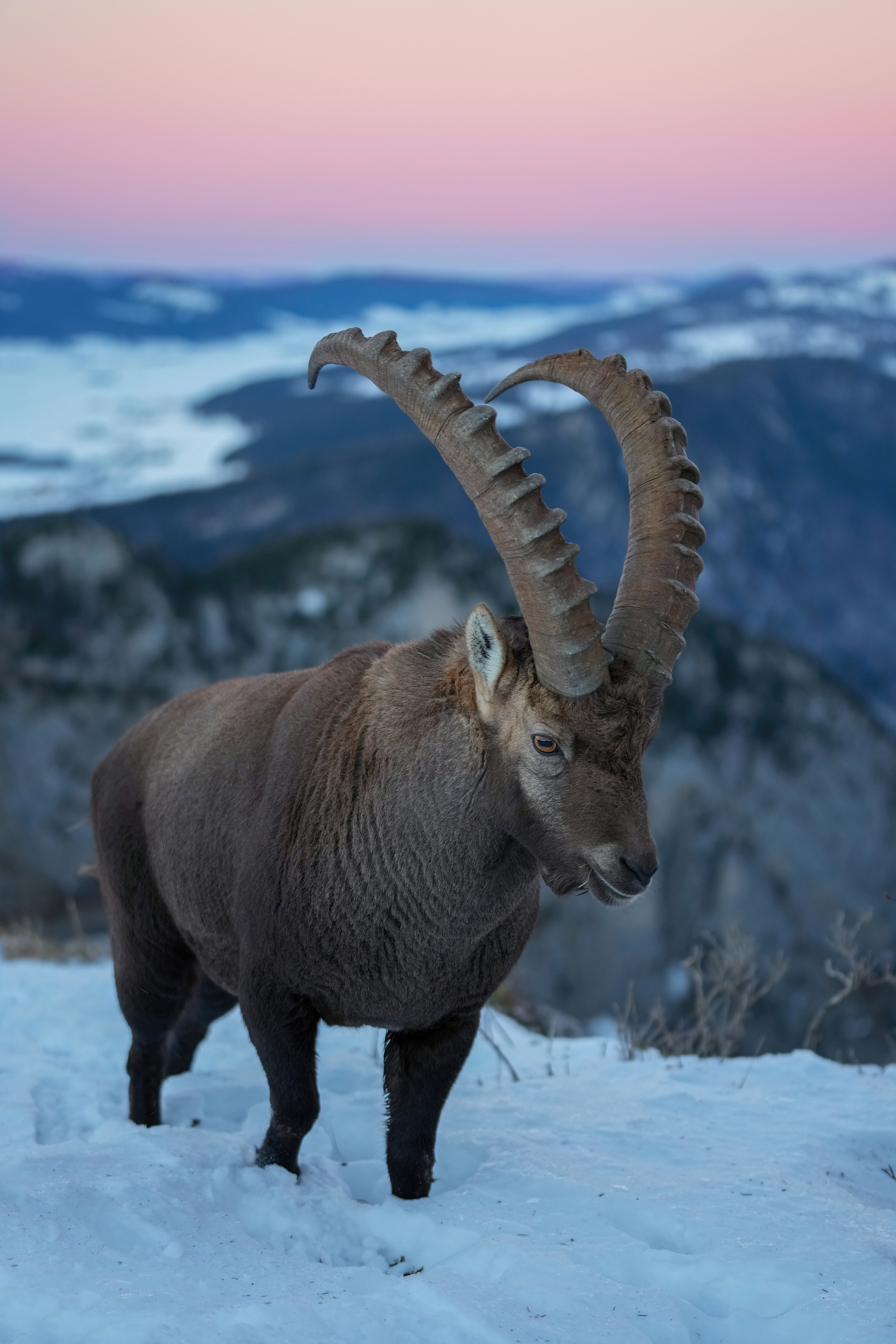
Ibex similar to ones in the Swiss National Park

A visitor centre is located in Zernez. The road through the park leads over the Fuorn Pass (or Ofenpass) to South Tyrol in Italy. In addition to the Swiss National Park, there are sixteen regional nature parks in Switzerland.

The Swiss National Park is home to several large animals. Visitors of the park will often hear and see alpine marmots. These may even be observed from very close up in one of the many designated resting places within the park. Other large animals include ibex, red deer, chamois, red fox, golden eagles and many more. Occasionally wolves and brown bears are also observed in the park but only rarely and these animals do not permanently reside in the park any more.

== History ==
After the 19th century led to a lot of the Swiss countryside being destroyed or cultivated to create space for farming in 1904 Swiss National Council Dr. Fritz E. Bühlmann among others called for the creation of a nature reserve. The Swiss Federal Council created a committee to determine a suitable location for this nature reserve, and the area surrounding the Fuorn Pass was found to be best suited for this endeavour due to its remoteness from civilization and richness in flora and fauna. In 1909 supporters of the idea leased the Val Cluozza from the municipality of Zernez for 25 years. In 1913 a non-standing committee of the Federal assembly visited the Val Cluozza and afterwards supported the idea of a national park. Within the following year the region around the Fuorn Pass and the Val Minger were leased from their respective municipality and the lease of the Val Cluozza was renewed to now all last 99 years. The municipality of Zernez was increasingly supporting the idea due to the fact that the leased area had little to no agricultural potential. On the national holiday of Switzerland, 1 August 1914, the Swiss National Park was opened. Initially the costs of the lease were paid by a private company, called the Schweizerischer Bund für Naturschutz (Swiss coalition for nature protection), which today is called Pro Natura. However, when in 1913 these costs could no longer be surmounted by the private company, the Swiss Federal Government took over the costs.

In 1936, the Val Tavrü was removed from the Park upon request by the municipality of Scuol. In 1959, the National Park was legally restructured. A law called the Bundesbeschluss für den Nationalpark (Federal law concerning the National Park) was passed, which among other things extended the leases indefinitely and banned high voltage lines leading through the park. In 1961, the park was heavily extended once more, now totalling 166.5 km^{2}.

In 1964, zoologist Robert F. Schloeth was appointed director of the park. He would go on to serve in that post for more than 25 years while heavily influencing the parks' development. In 1968, during his tenure a new visitor centre was inaugurated in Zernez as was a Naturlernpfad (Nature learning hike) on the Fuorn pass in 1976. It was during Schloeth's tenure as director that the park would become part of the UNESCO Biosphere Reserve and would be classified as a IUCN category Ia.

The most recent extension of the park occurred in 2000, when 3.6 km^{2} the Macun Lakes and surrounding area was added to the park. There was a proposition to create a less heavily regulated zone in the areas surrounding the park, which was however rejected by the public. In 2008, a new visitor centre was inaugurated in Zernez. Some of the changes in territory that the park underwent since its inception in 1909 are detailed in the table below:

Map	Year	Total area of the park	Notes
	1909	25.2 km^{2}	Original area leased by the Schweizerischer Bund für Naturschutz from the municipality of Zernez.
	1914	137.0 km^{2}	With the help of the federal government the park is able to expand majorly by adding 58 km^{2} from Zernez after having already gained additional territory in 1911 from the municipalities of Zernez, Scuol and S-chanf.
	1932	163.9 km^{2}	Addition of 10.7 km^{2} from the municipality of Zernez now adding the Val Ftur and the Champlönch to the park. Moreover, the highlands of the Val Trupchun and the Fuorcla Trupchun totalling 5.1 km^{2} are added from the municipality of S-chanf.
	2000	170.3 km^{2}	The last addition to the park, the Macun Lakes, once again made it disconnected. The park appears in this form ever since 2000.

== Traffic ==
A specific point of contention within the park is the noise pollution caused by motorbikes on the Ofen Pass road (Ofenpassstrasse). Visitor surveys conducted by the National Park reveal that motorbike noise is widely perceived as a major nuisance, particularly during the summer months. Technical analyses attribute this to the physical characteristics of motorcycle noise, amongst other things. The low-frequency components and high engine revolutions are often audible over a wide area within the National Park's topography (narrow valleys and wooded areas), and are perceived as more intense than car traffic. This conflicts with the park's conservation objective of providing a largely undisturbed quiet zone for wildlife and visitors seeking relaxation.

== Park rules ==
In the park, visitors have to follow strict rules. These rules are regulated in a special cantonal law by the canton of Grisons and enforced by park rangers throughout the park. If these rules are not followed, the park rangers may fine visitors up to 300 swiss francs. Some of the rules are as follows:

- It is strictly forbidden to leave the marked paths as well as the resting areas marked with posts. The route of these paths is defined in cantonal law. Violating this rule will lead to a fine of 250 CHF.
- No litter. Violating this rule will lead to a fine of 100 CHF.
- No natural object may be picked or removed: animals, plants, sticks, stones, etc.
- Dogs are not allowed in the Park, not even on a lead.
- Entry in winter is forbidden.
- No winter sports, cycling or flying of any sort are permitted.
- Bathing in lakes, pools, streams and rivers is not permitted.
- No camp fires. Violation of this rule will lead to a fine of 300 CHF.
- Overnight stays are strictly forbidden, including in parked vehicles alongside the main Pass dal Fuorn road as well as bivouac.
- Nature must be left undisturbed.
- Flying drones of any kind is forbidden.

== Hiking routes ==
There are 21 numbered hiking routes in the National Park, of which 3 and 4 are alpine hikes. Hike no. 4 leads on top of Piz Quattervals (3165 m.a.s.l.), which is the highest peak in the park.

Route		Length
1	Alp Trupchun	9.5 km, about 3 hours
2	Fuorcla Trupchun	3.0 km, about 2 hours 15 minutes
3	Fuorcla Val Sassa	17.5 km, about 7 hours 30 minutes
4	Piz Quattervals	5.0 km, about 5 hours
5	Val Tantermozza	1.5 km, about 40 minutes
6	Murtaröl	8.0 km, about 3 hours 30 minutes
7	CHamanna Cluozza	8.0 km, about 3 hours 30 minutes
8	Murtersattel	7.5 km, about 3 hours 45 minutes
9	Margun Grimmels	3.5 km, about 1 hour 15 minutes
10	Val Spöl	8.0 km, about 2 hours 45 minutes
11	Alp la Schera	3.0 km, about 1 hour 15 minutes
12	Grimmels	6.0 km, about 2 hours, 15 minutes
13	Champlönch	5.0 km, about 2 hours
14	Punt la Drossa – Il Fuorn	2.5 km, about 1 hour
15	Munt la Schera	13.0 km, about 4 hours 45 minutes
16	Fuorntal	5.0 km, about 1 hour 45 minutes
17	Margunet	8.0 km, about 3 hours
18	Fuorcla Val dal Botsch	17.5 km, about 6 hours 45 minutes
19	Val Mingèr	5.5 km, about 2 hours 15 minutes
20	Mot Tavrü	6.0 km, about 2 hours 15 minutes
21	Lais da Macun	21.0 km, about 8 hours

== Notable peaks ==
- Piz Pisoc, 3173 m.
- Piz Quattervals, 3165 m.
- Piz da l'Acqua, 3126 m.
- Piz Chaschauna, 3071 m.

== Gallery ==
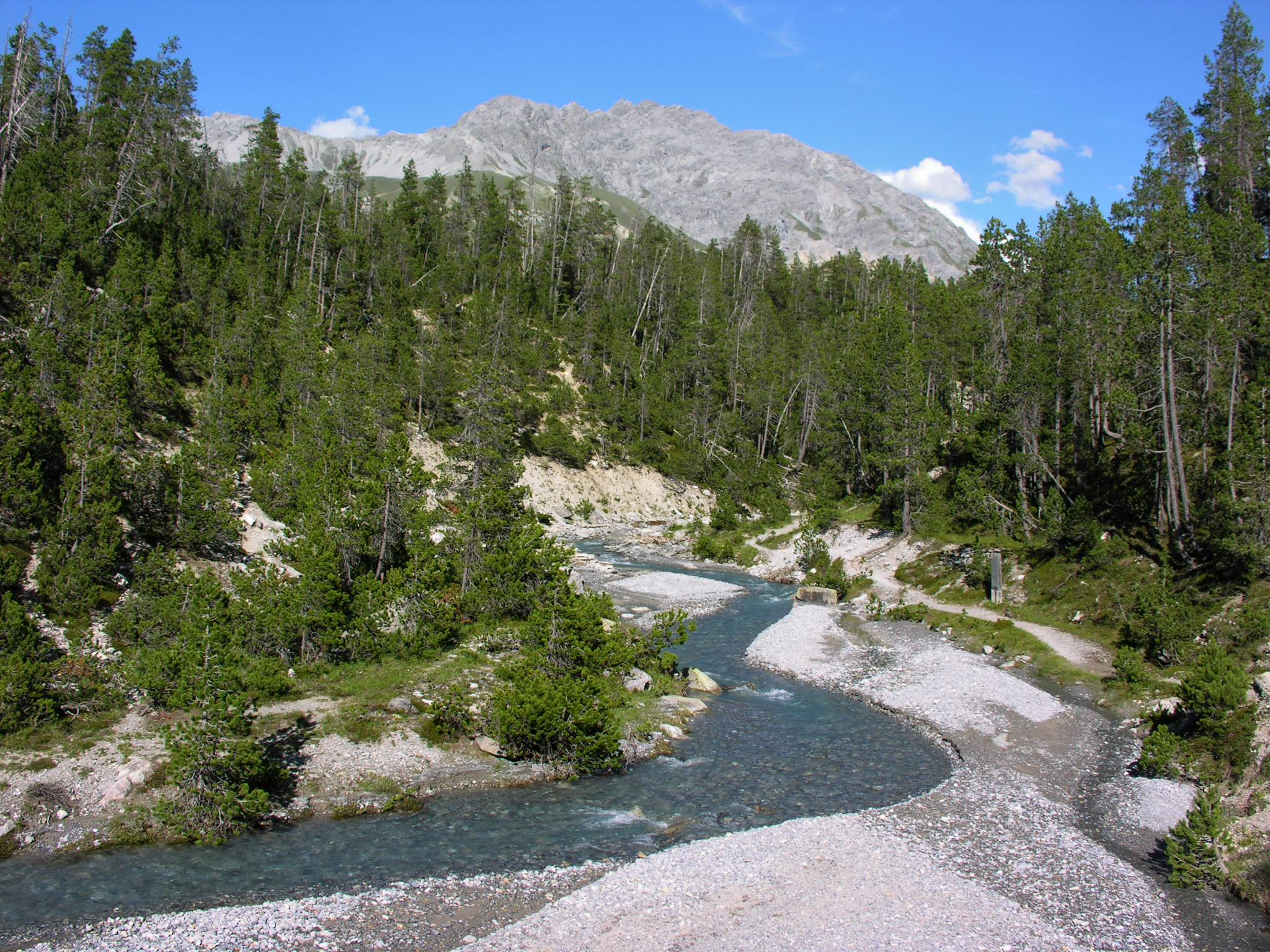

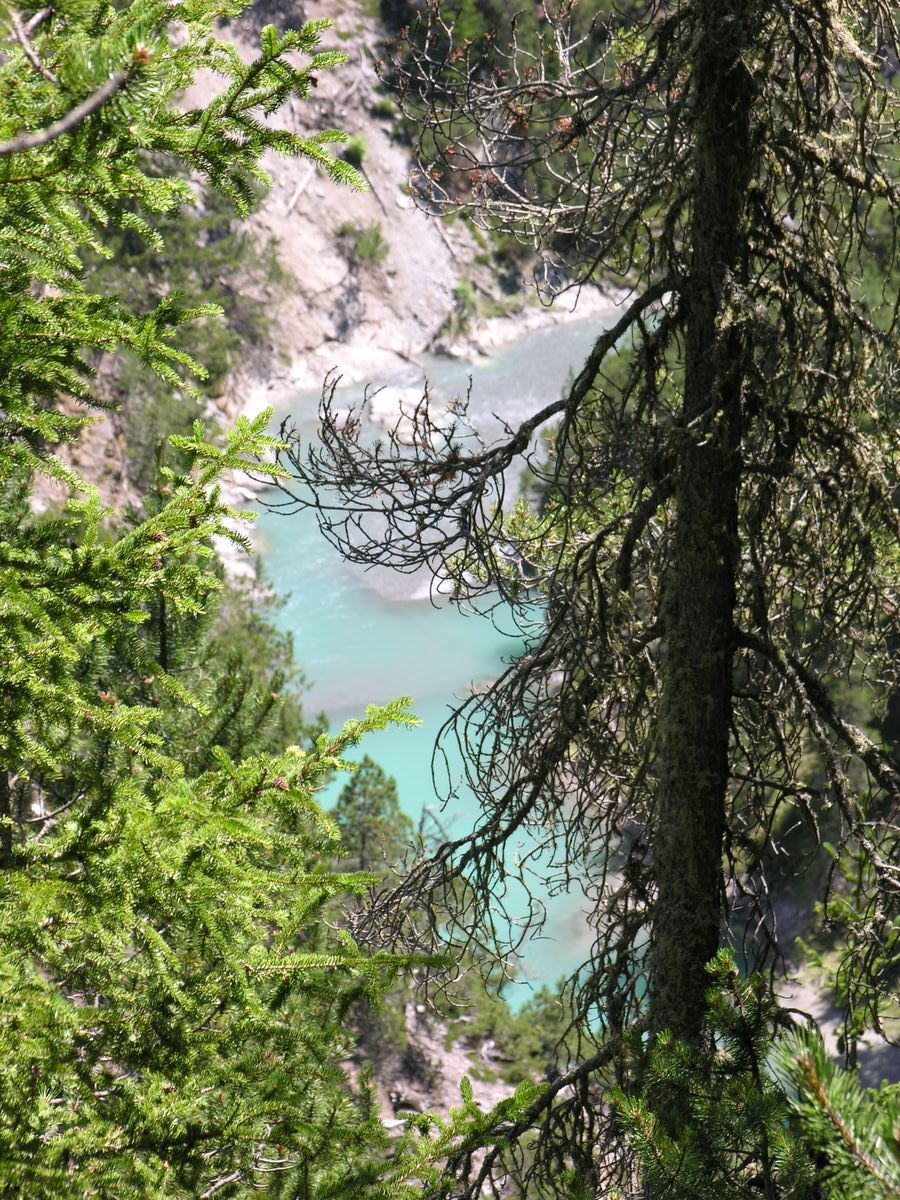

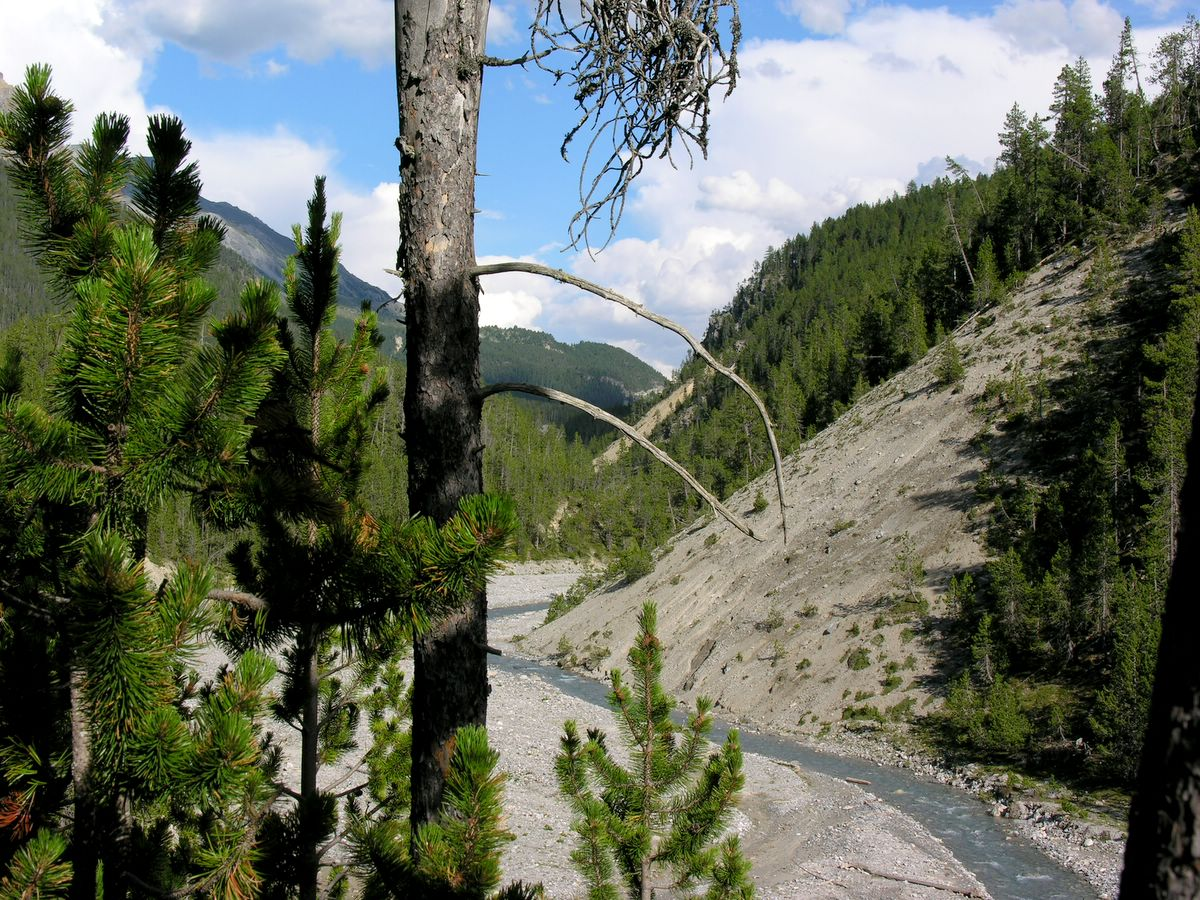

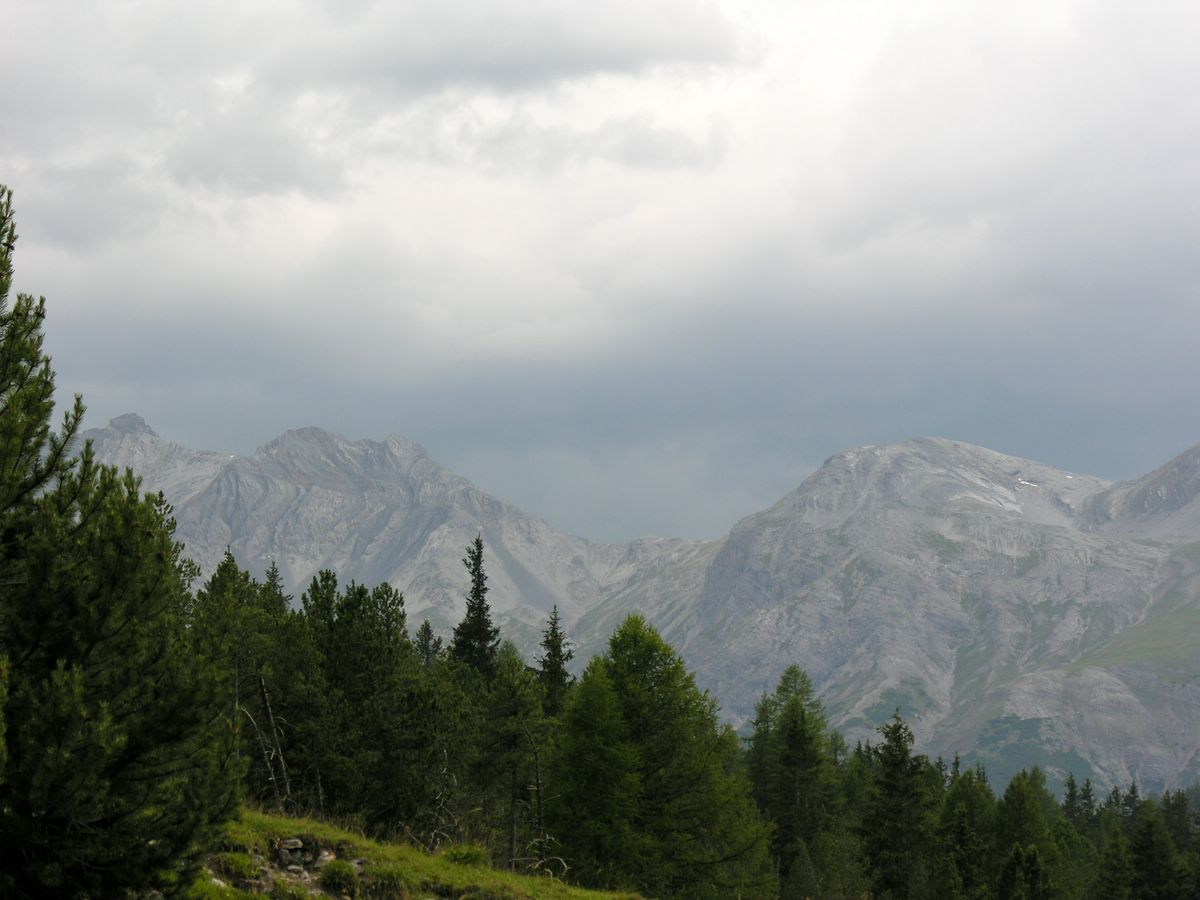

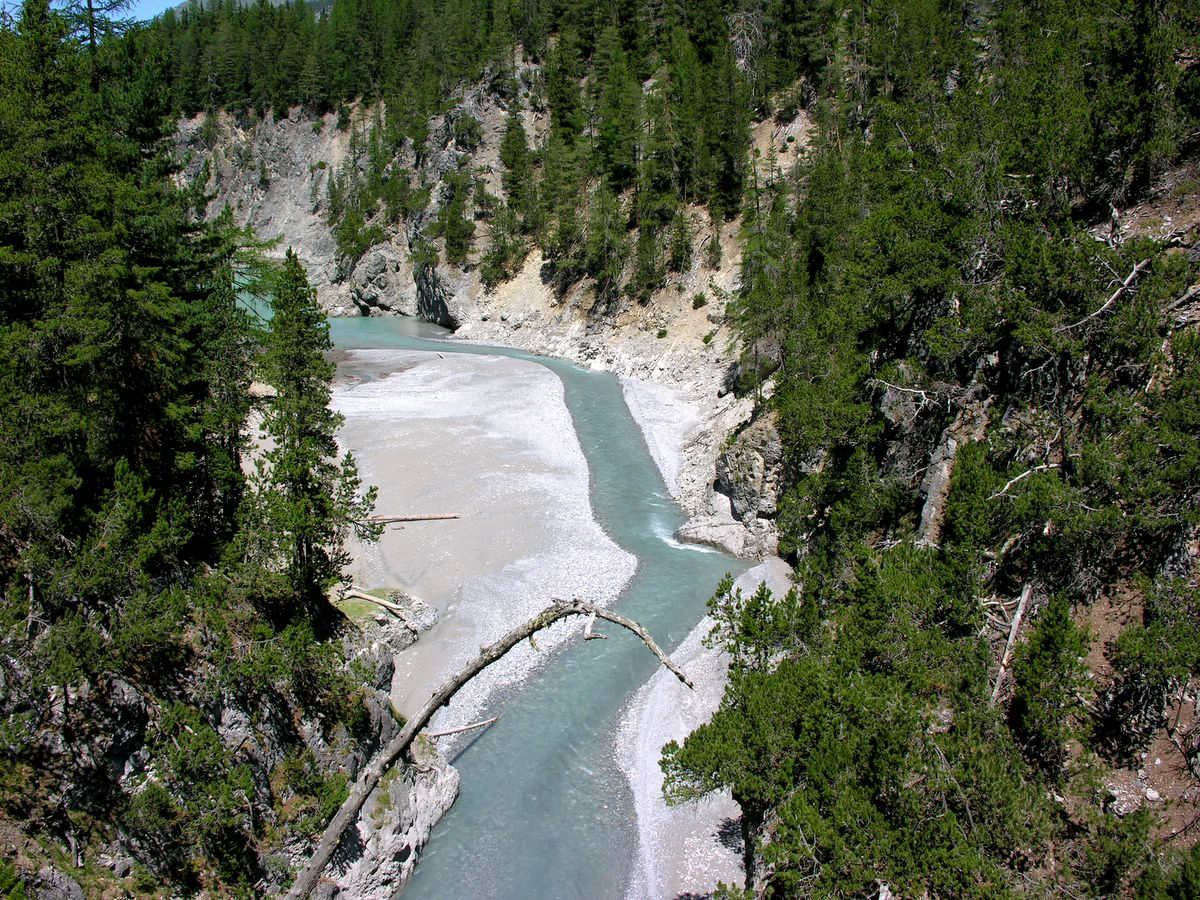

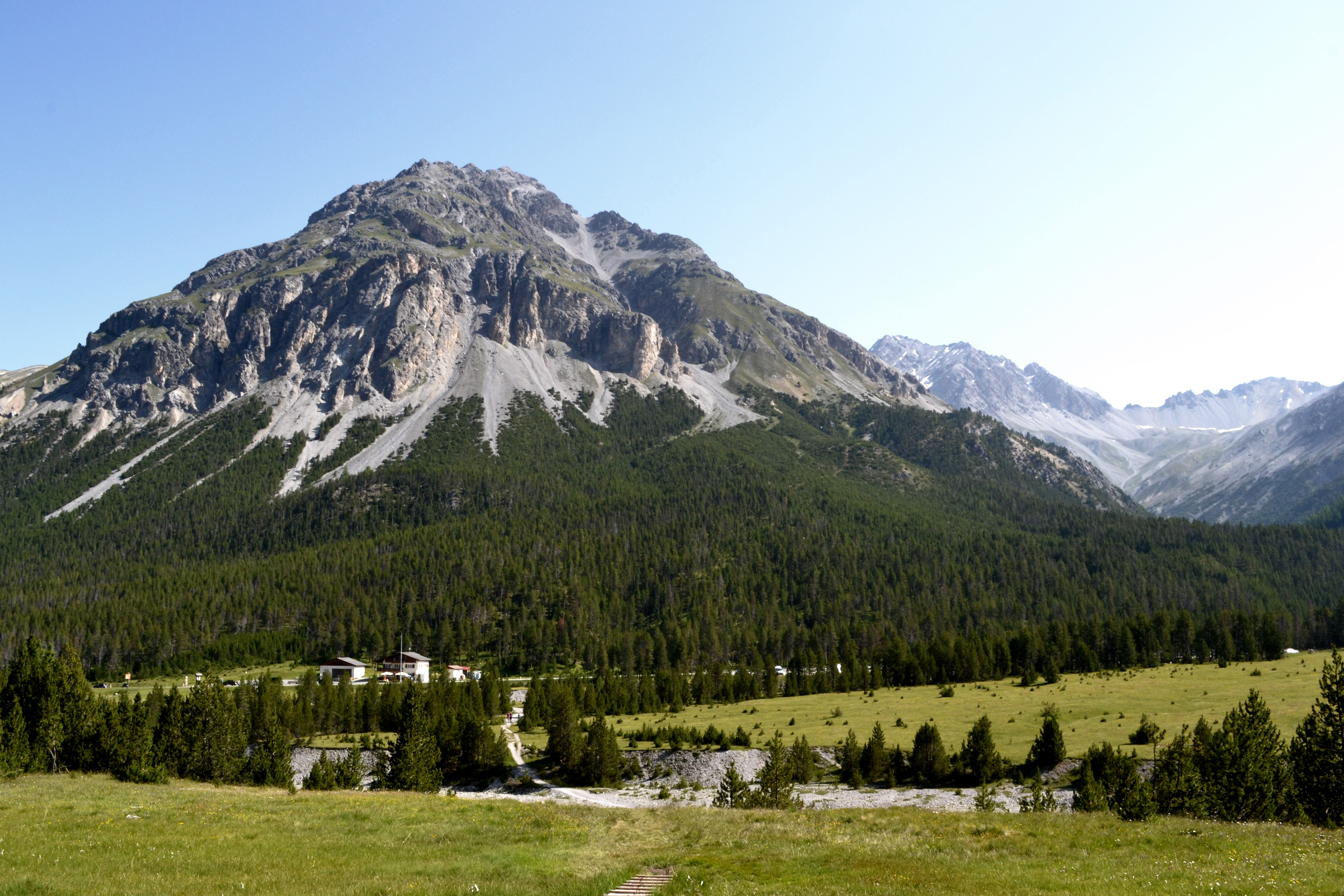

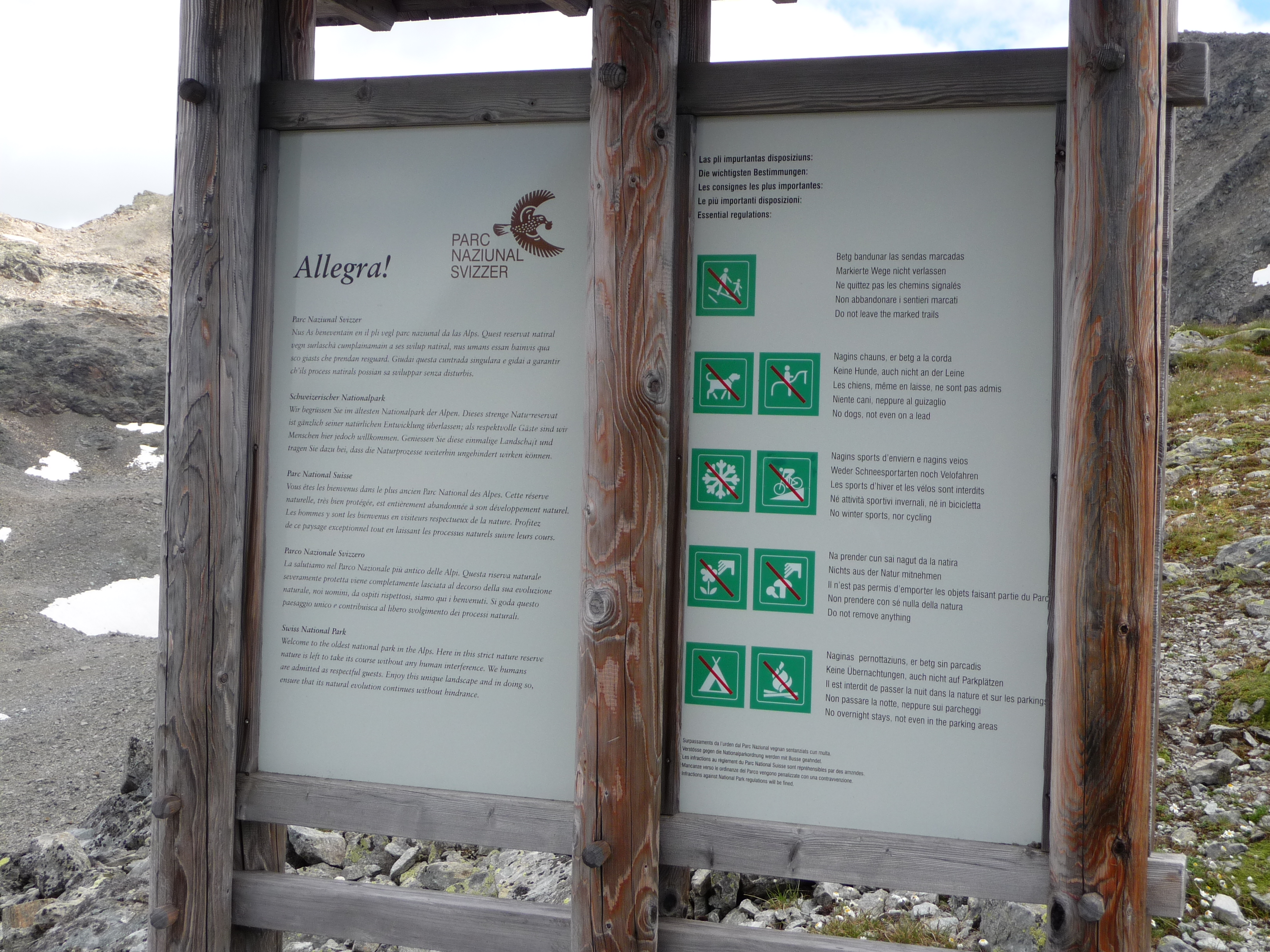

== See also ==
- Nature parks in Switzerland
- Pro Natura
- List of national parks
