= Piz Languard =

Mountain in Switzerland

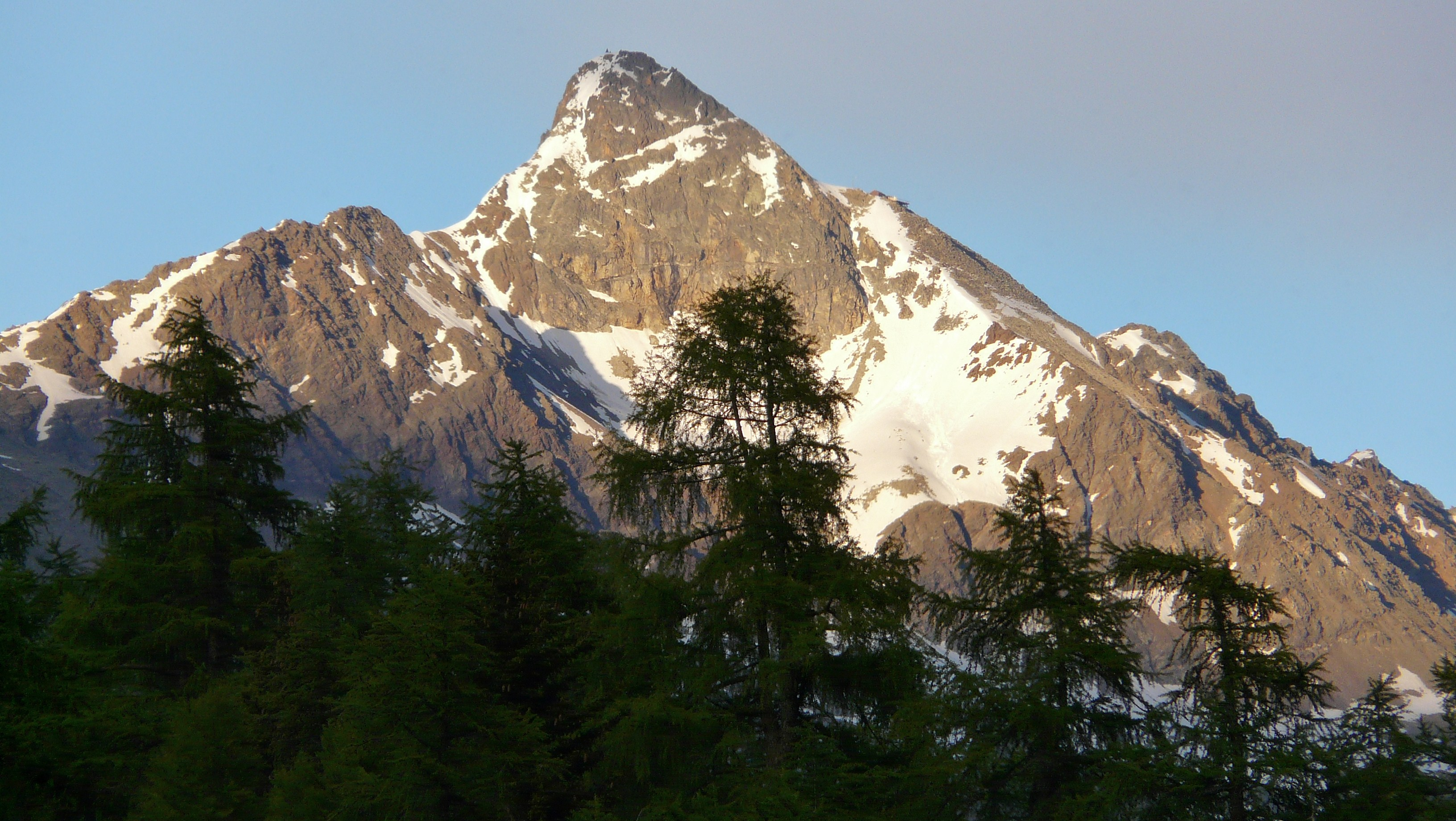
- Piz Languard from St. Moritz

Highest point
- Elevation: 3,262 m (10,702 ft)
- Prominence: 947 m (3,107 ft)
- Parent peak: Cima Viola
- Listing: Alpine mountains above 3000 m
- Coordinates: 46°29′18.5″N 9°57′23.3″E

Geography
- Location within Switzerland
- Location: Graubünden, Switzerland
- Parent range: Livigno Alps

Piz Languard is a mountain of the Livigno Alps, overlooking Pontresina in the canton of Graubünden. With a height of 3,262 metres (10,702 ft) above sea level, it is one of the highest summits of the Livigno Alps and the highest summit of the range that lies west of the Livigno Pass (2,315 m). The summit can be accessed via a trail from the heights of Pontresina and is a popular goal for hikers. A privately owned mountain hut named Chamanna Georgy is located at 3,175 metres.

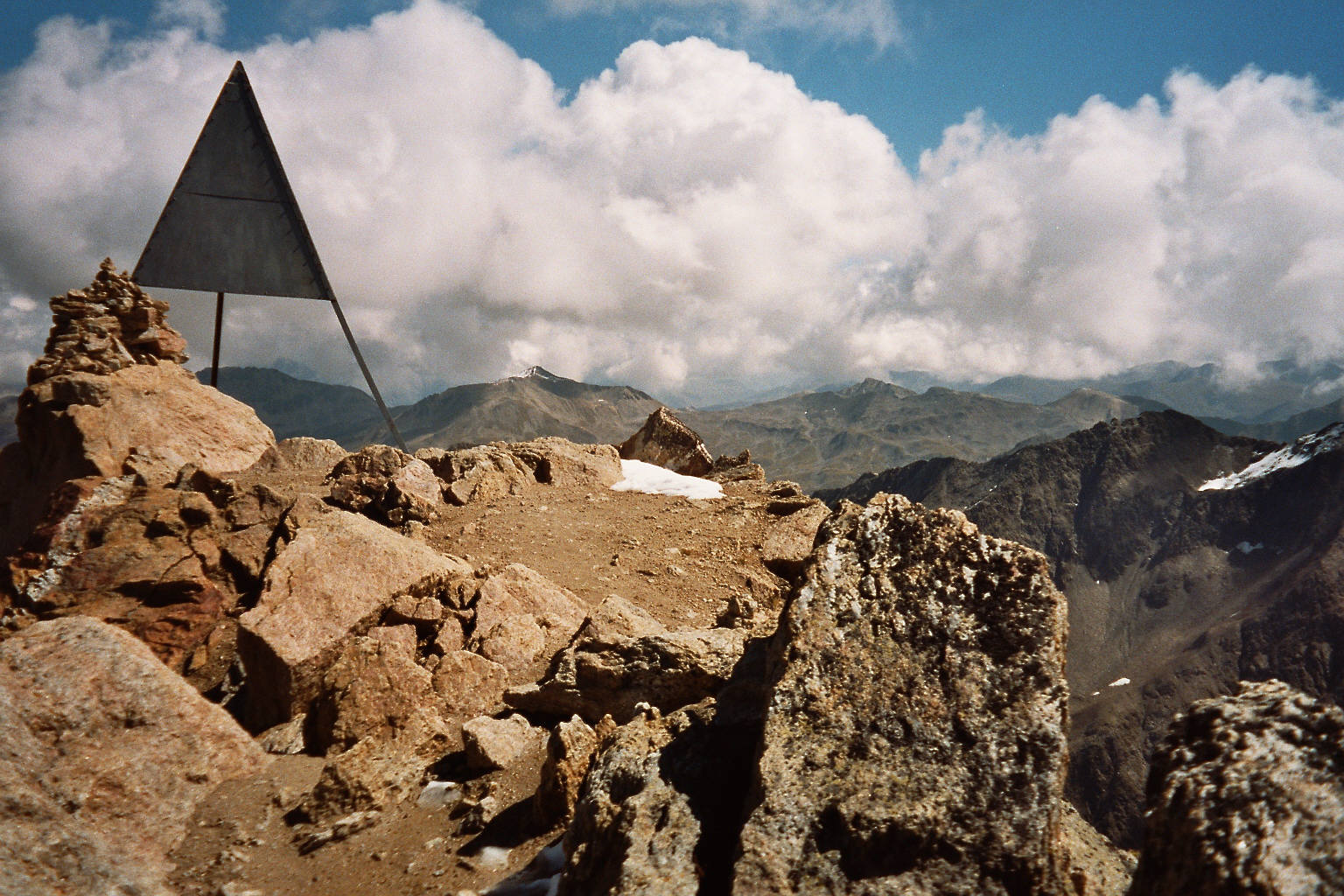
View from the summit
