= Livigno Alps =

Mountain range in Switzerland and Italy

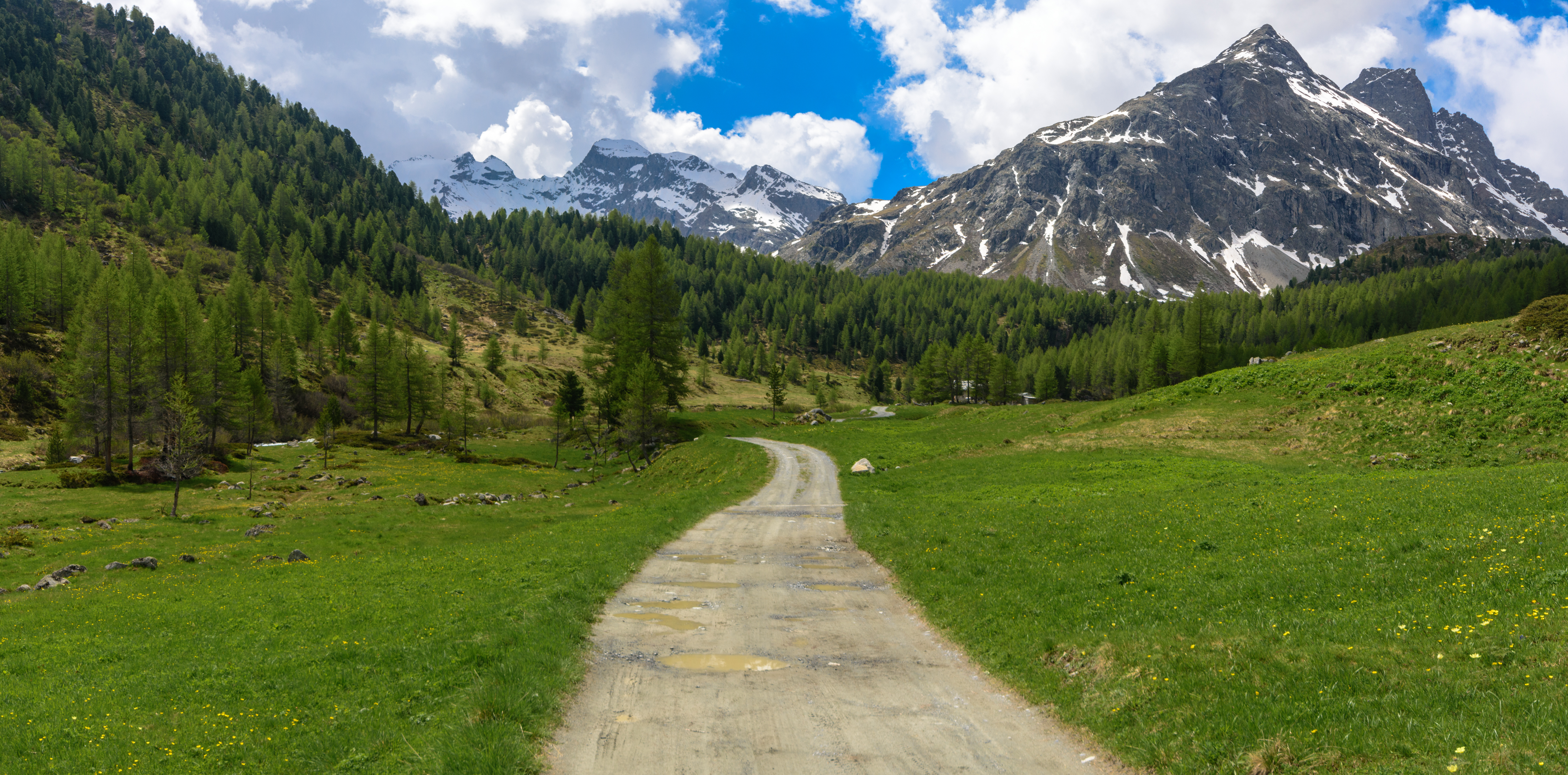
- Cima Viola and Corno di Dosdè

Highest point
- Peak: Cima de' Piazzi
- Elevation: 3,439 m (11,283 ft)
- Coordinates: 46°31′4″N 10°5′43″E

Geography
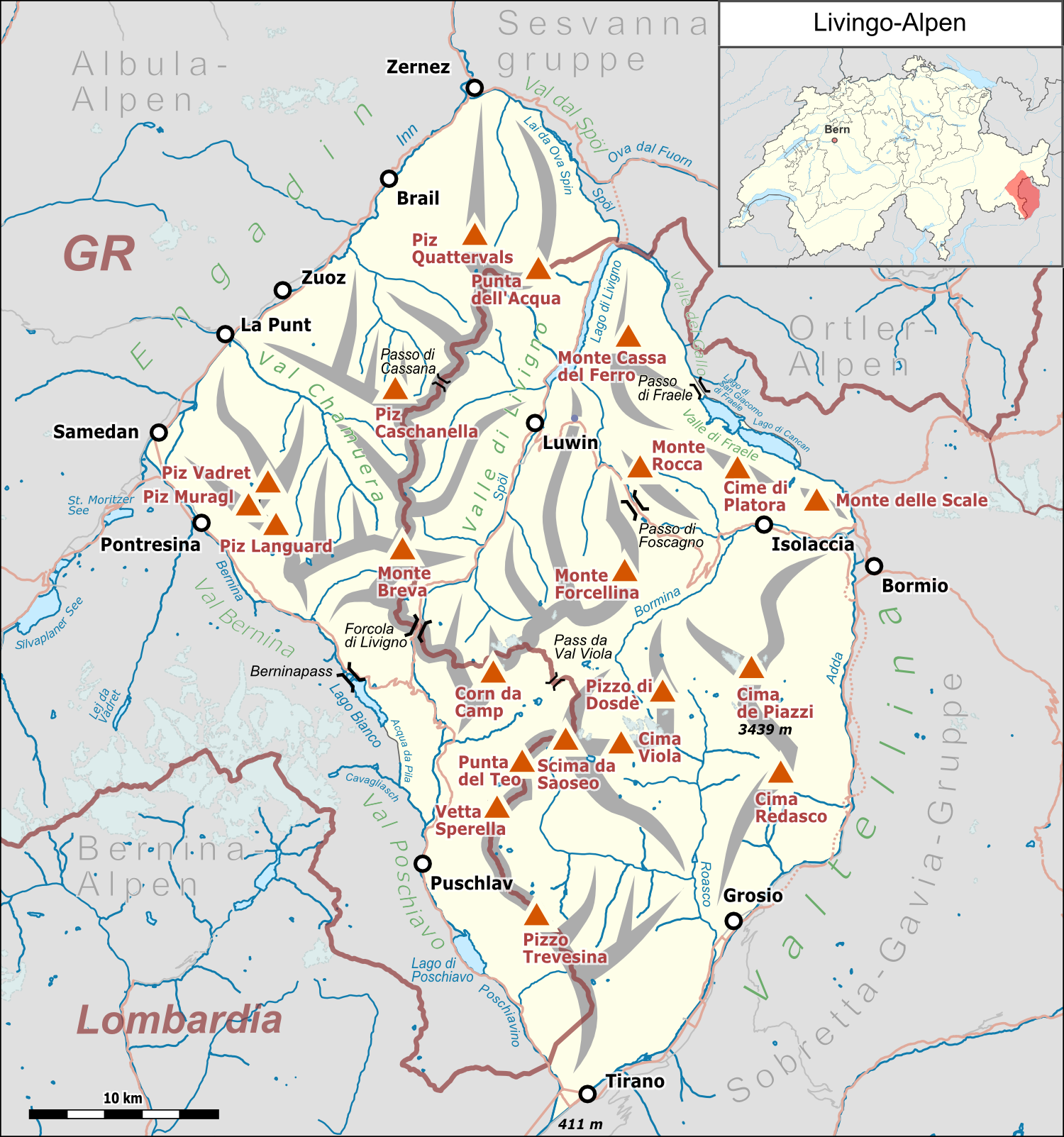
- Livigno Alps; The borders of the range according to Alpine Club classification of the Eastern Alps
- Countries: Switzerland; Italy
- States: Graubünden; Lombardy
- Parent range: Central Eastern Alps

The Livigno Alps are a mountain range in the Alps of eastern Switzerland and northern Italy, around the Italian village Livigno. They are considered to be part of the Central Eastern Alps. The tallest peak in this mountain range is Cima de' Piazzi at 11,283 ft.

The Livigno Alps are separated from the Bernina Range in the south-west by the Bernina Pass; from the Albula Alps in the north-west by the Upper Engadin valley; from the Sesvenna Alps in the north-east by the Spöl valley; from the Ortler Alps in the east by the Passo di Fraéle and the upper Adda River valley (Valtellina).

The Livigno Alps are drained by the rivers Adda River, Inn and Rom (tributary of the Adige).

== Peaks ==
The main peaks of the Livigno Alps are:

Peak	Elevation (m/ft)	
Cima de' Piazzi	3439	11,283
Cima Viola	3384	11,103
Piz Paradisin	3305	10,844
Pizzo di Dosde	3280	10,762
Scima da Saoseo	3277	10,752
Piz Languard	3266	10,716
Corno di Dosdè	3232	10,604
Piz Val Nera	3188	10,459
Piz Quattervals	3157	10,358
Cime Redasco	3139	10,299
Munt Cotschen	3104	10,184
Piz Sena	3078	10,099
Piz Chaschauna	3072	10,079
Piz dal Diavel	3062	10,046
Piz Lavirun	3052	10,013
Monte Foscagno	3051	10,010
Piz dal Teo	3050	10,007
Pizzo del Ferro (Val Fraele)	3050	10,007
Piz Saliente	3048	10,000
Piz Mezzaun	2963	9,721
Piz Lagalb	2959	9,708
Piz Trevisina	2823	9,262
Monte Massuccio	2816	9,239
Muottas Muragl	2454	8,051

== Passes ==
The main passes of the Livigno Alps are:

Mountain pass	location	type	Elevation (m / ft)	
Passo di Dosde	Val Grosina to Val Viola Bormina	footpath	2850	9351
Passo di Sacco	Bernina road to Grosio	footpath	2751	9026
Chaschauna Pass	S-chanf to Livigno	bridle path	2692	8832
Passo di Val Viola	Bernina road to Bormio	bridle path	2431	7976
Bernina Pass	Pontresina to Tirano	road	2330	7645
Forcola di Livigno	Bernina Pass to Livigno	road	2328	7638
Passo di Verva	Bormio to Grosio	footpath	2314	7592
Foscagno Pass	Bormio to Trepalle	road	2291	7517
Alpisella Pass	Livigno to Val Fraele	bridle path	2285	7497
Passo d'Eira	Livigno to Trepalle	road	2209	7248
Fraele Pass	Val Fraele to the Ofen Pass road	bridle path	1950	6398
Scale di Fraele	Bormio to Val Fraele	dirt road	1942	6372

== See also ==
- Swiss Alps
- List of mountains in Switzerland
