= Cima Viola =

Mountain in Italy

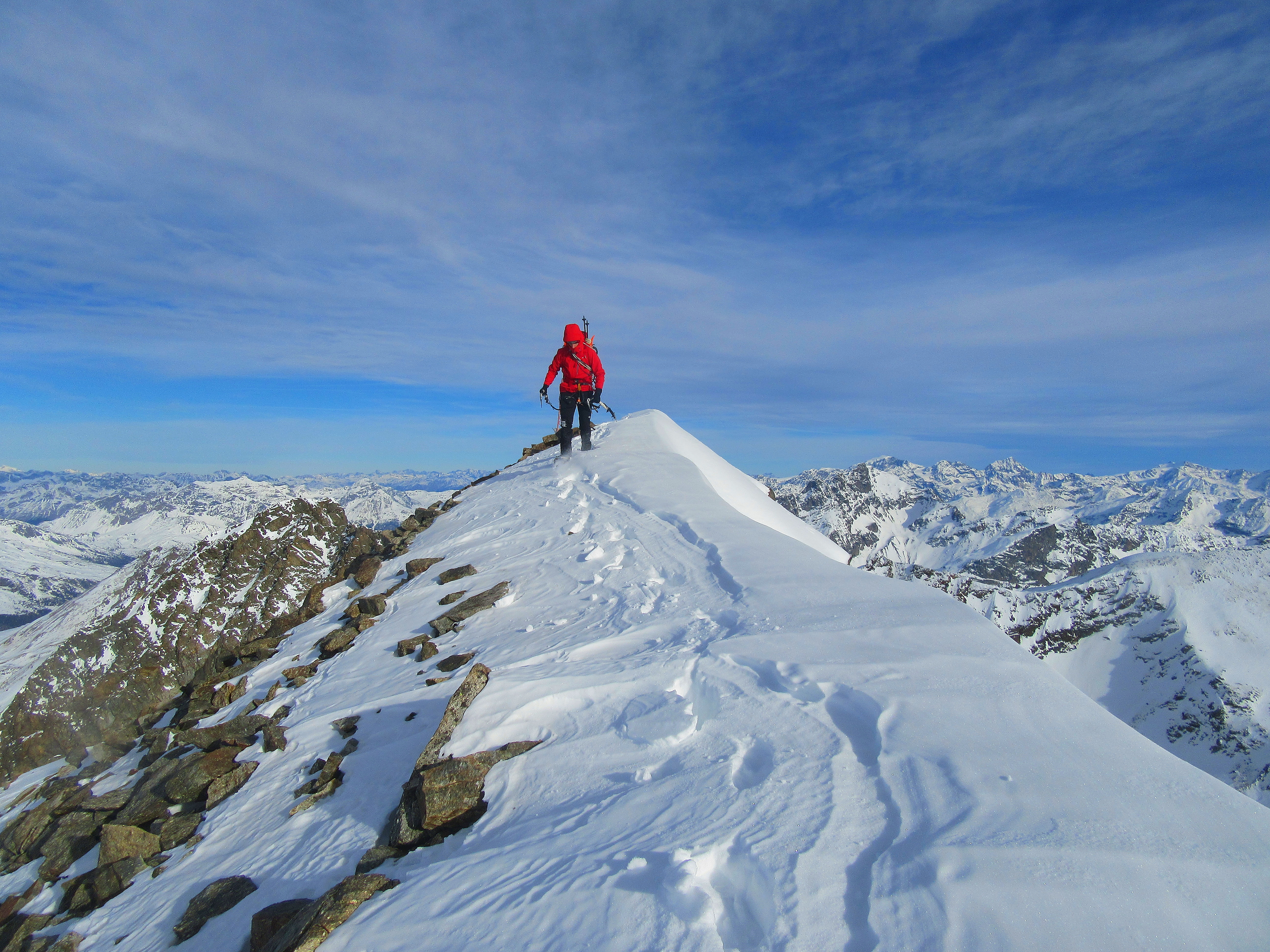
- Summit of Cima Viola

Highest point
- Elevation: 3,374 m (11,070 ft)
- Prominence: 1,073 m (3,520 ft)
- Parent peak: Cima Piazzi
- Listing: Alpine mountains above 3000 m
- Coordinates: 46°23′01″N 10°11′47″E

Geography
- Location within Alps
- Location: Lombardy, Italy
- Parent range: Livigno Alps

Cima Viola is a mountain of Lombardy, Italy. The 3,374-meter Cima Viola is one of the most prominent peaks of the Livigno Alps in Lombardy.

== See also ==
- List of mountains of the Alps
