= Piz Mingèr =

Mountain in Switzerland

- Location within Switzerland

Highest point
- Elevation: 3,114 m (10,217 ft)
- Prominence: 123 m (404 ft)
- Parent peak: Piz da la Crappa
- Coordinates: 46°43′44.5″N 10°16′3.8″E

Geography
- Location: Graubünden, Switzerland
- Parent range: Sesvenna Range

Piz Mingèr (3,114 m) is a mountain in the Sesvenna Range of the Alps, located west of S-charl in the canton of Graubünden. It lies on the range north of Piz Foraz, between the Val Plavna and the Val S-charl.

The east side of the mountain is part of the Swiss National Park.
