= Piz Ajüz =

Mountain in Switzerland

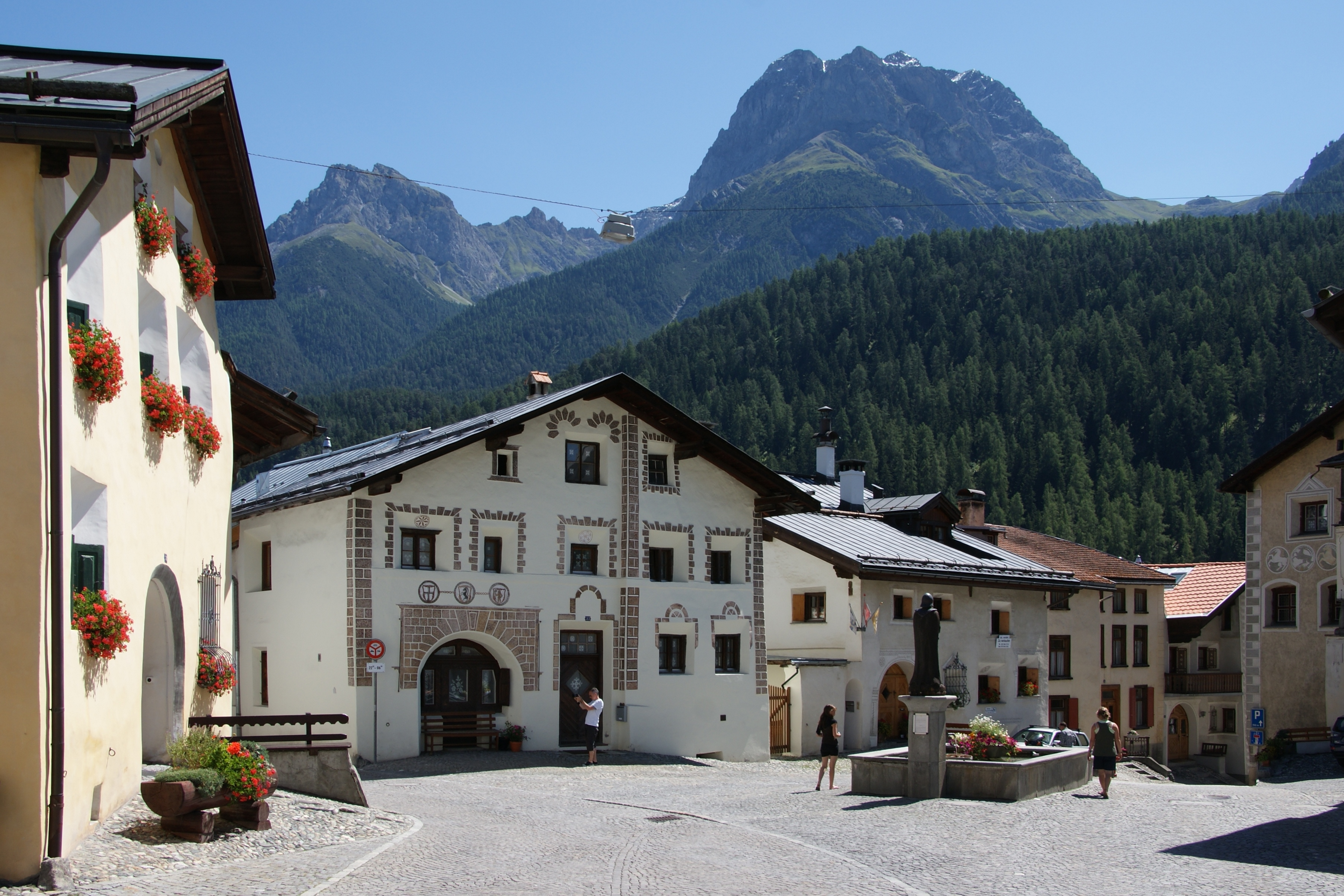
- Piz Ajüz (left) and Piz Lischana (right) from Scuol

Highest point
- Elevation: 2,788 m (9,147 ft)
- Prominence: 110 m (360 ft)
- Parent peak: Piz Sesvenna
- Coordinates: 46°46′56″N 10°21′22″E

Geography
- Location within Switzerland
- Location: Graubünden, Switzerland
- Parent range: Sesvenna Range

Piz Ajüz (2,788 m) is a mountain in the Sesvenna Range of the Alps, located south-east of Scuol in the canton of Graubünden. It lies north of Piz Triazza, on the range between the Val Triazza and the Val d'Uina.
