= Piz Foraz =

Mountain in Switzerland

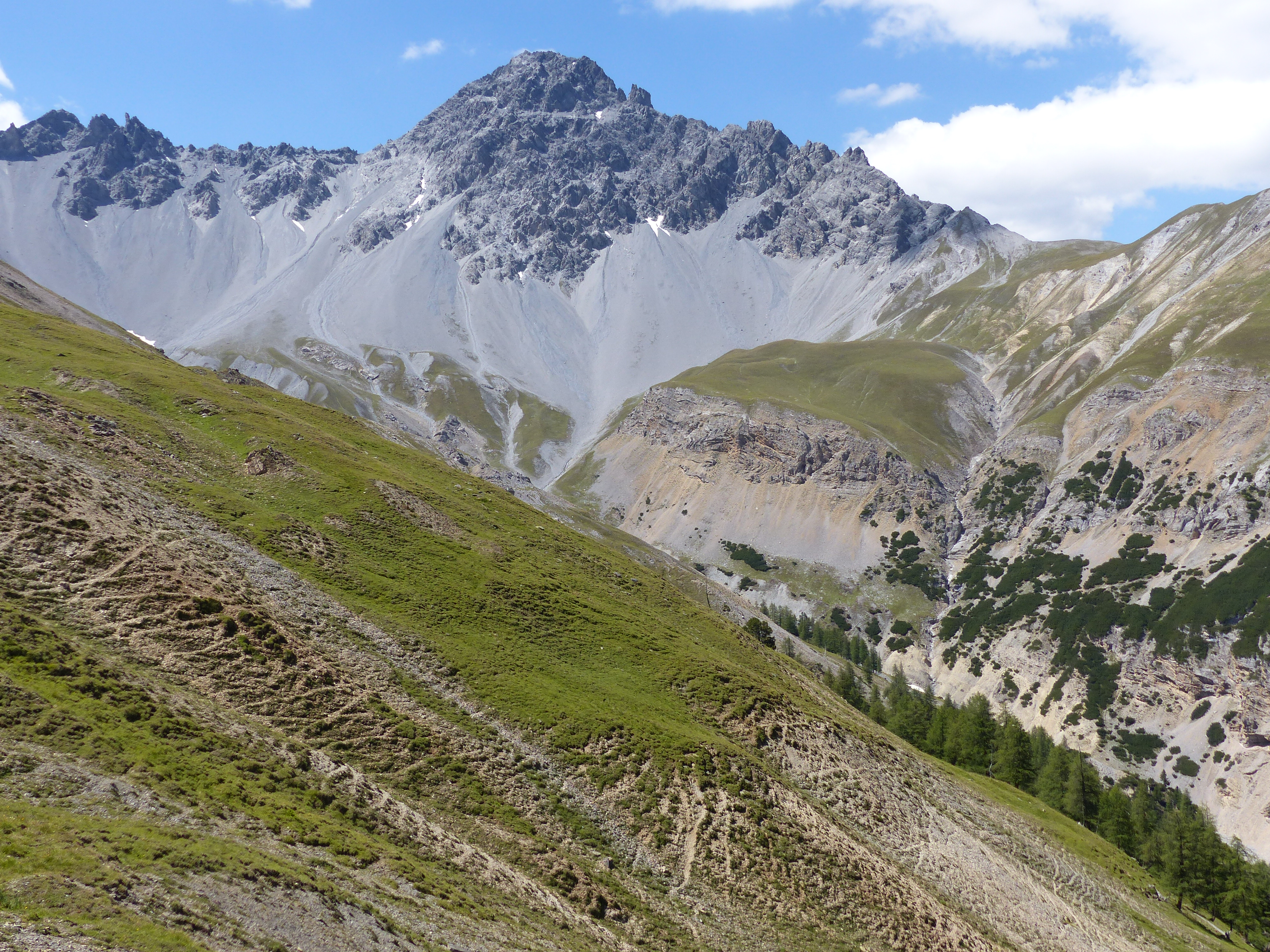
- Piz Foraz (seen from saddle below Mot Tavrü)

Highest point
- Elevation: 3,092 m (10,144 ft)
- Prominence: 238 m (781 ft)
- Parent peak: Piz Tavrü
- Coordinates: 46°41′26.5″N 10°16′37″E

Geography
- Location within Switzerland
- Location: Graubünden, Switzerland
- Parent range: Sesvenna Range

Piz Foraz is a mountain in the Sesvenna Range of the Alps, located south-west of S-charl in the canton of Graubünden.

The south and east sides of the mountain are part of the Swiss National Park.
