= Piz Terza =

Mountain in Switzerland

- Urtirolaspitz
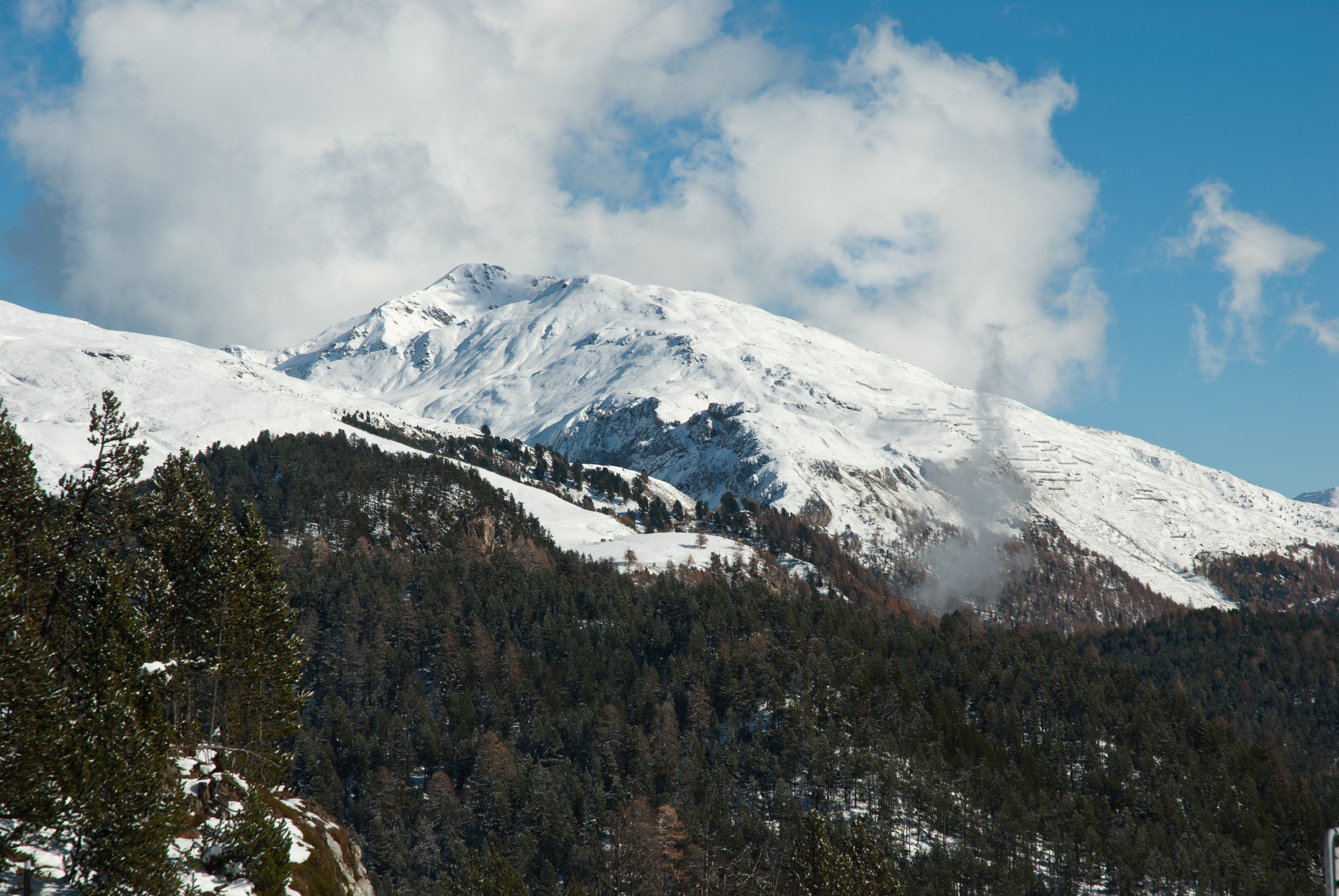
- Piz Terza seen from Fuorn Pass

Highest point
- Elevation: 2,909 m (9,544 ft)
- Prominence: 275 m (902 ft)
- Parent peak: Piz Starlex
- Coordinates: 46°38′19″N 10°24′00″E

Geography
- Location within Alps
- Location: Graubünden, Switzerland; South Tyrol, Italy
- Parent range: Sesvenna Range

Piz Terza (also known as Urtirolaspitz) is a mountain in the Sesvenna Range of the Alps, located on the border between Italy and Switzerland.

The closest locality is Müstair.
