= Piz Plavna Dadora =

Mountain in Switzerland

- Location within Switzerland

Highest point
- Elevation: 2,981 m (9,780 ft)
- Prominence: 210 m (690 ft)
- Parent peak: Piz Pisoc
- Coordinates: 46°44′14.5″N 10°15′03″E

Geography
- Location: Graubünden, Switzerland
- Parent range: Sesvenna Range

Piz Plavna Dadora is a mountain in the Sesvenna Range of the Alps, located south of Tarasp in the canton of Graubünden. It overlooks the Val Plavna on its west side.
