= Piz Cristanas =

Mountain in Switzerland

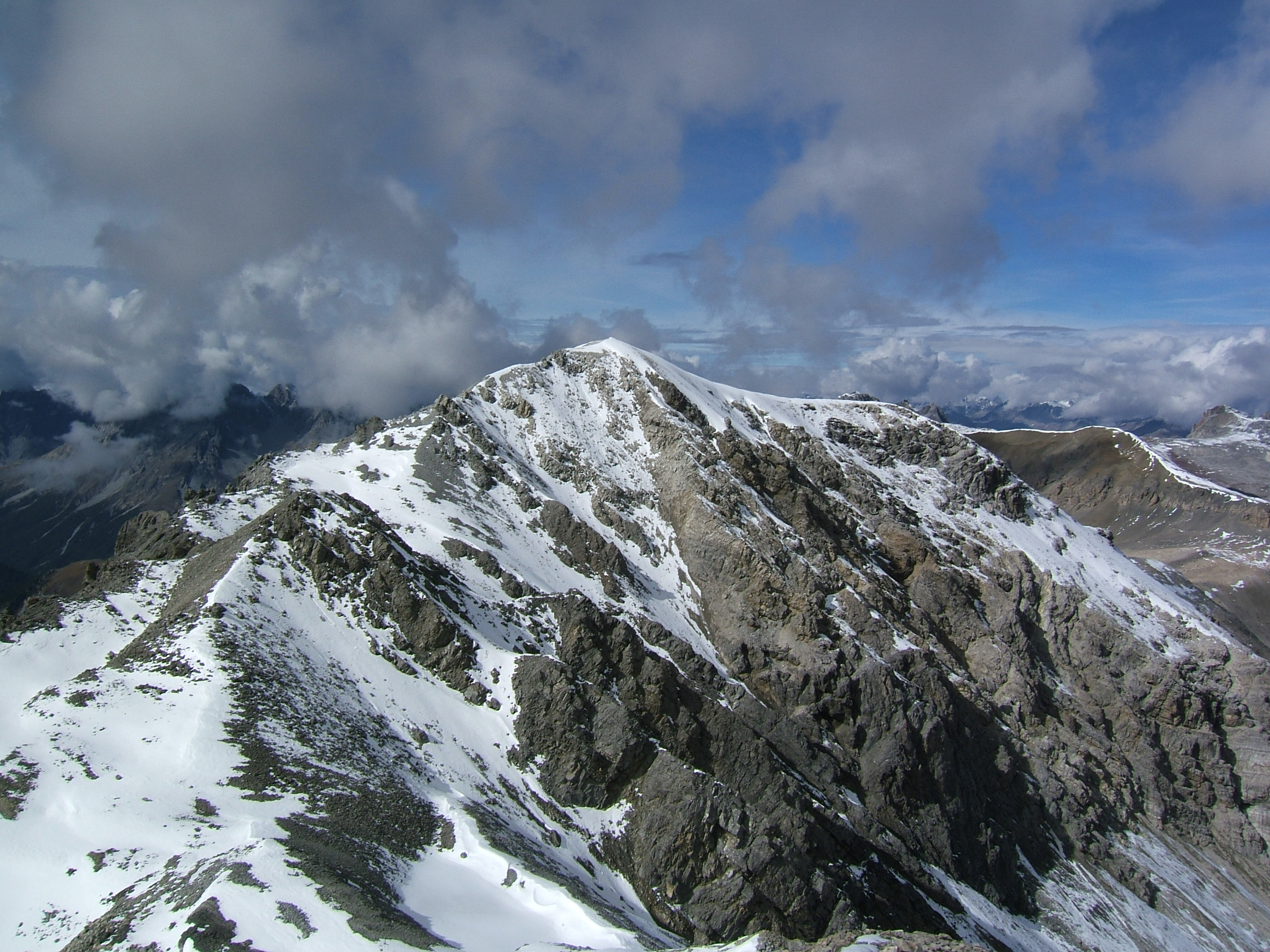
- Piz Cristanas from east, from Piz Rims

Highest point
- Elevation: 3,092 m (10,144 ft)
- Prominence: 239 m (784 ft)
- Parent peak: Piz Lischana
- Coordinates: 46°44′4.4″N 10°23′31.8″E

Geography
- Location within Switzerland
- Location: Graubünden, Switzerland (mountain partially in Italy)
- Parent range: Sesvenna Range

Piz Cristanas is a mountain in the Sesvenna Range of the Alps, located east of S-charl in the canton of Graubünden. It lies on the range between the Val Sesvenna and the Val d'Uina, a few hundred metres west of the Italian border.
