= Piz da la Crappa =

Mountain in Switzerland

- Location within Switzerland

Highest point
- Elevation: 3,122 m (10,243 ft)
- Prominence: 250 m (820 ft)
- Parent peak: Piz Pisoc
- Coordinates: 46°43′58″N 10°15′52″E

Geography
- Location: Graubünden, Switzerland
- Parent range: Sesvenna Range

Piz da la Crappa (3,122 m) is a mountain in the Sesvenna Range of the Alps, located west of S-charl in the canton of Graubünden. Its summit is the tripoint between the Val Plavna, the Val Zuort and the Val S-charl.

The east side of the mountain is part of the Swiss National Park.
