= Piz Lad =

Mountain in Switzerland

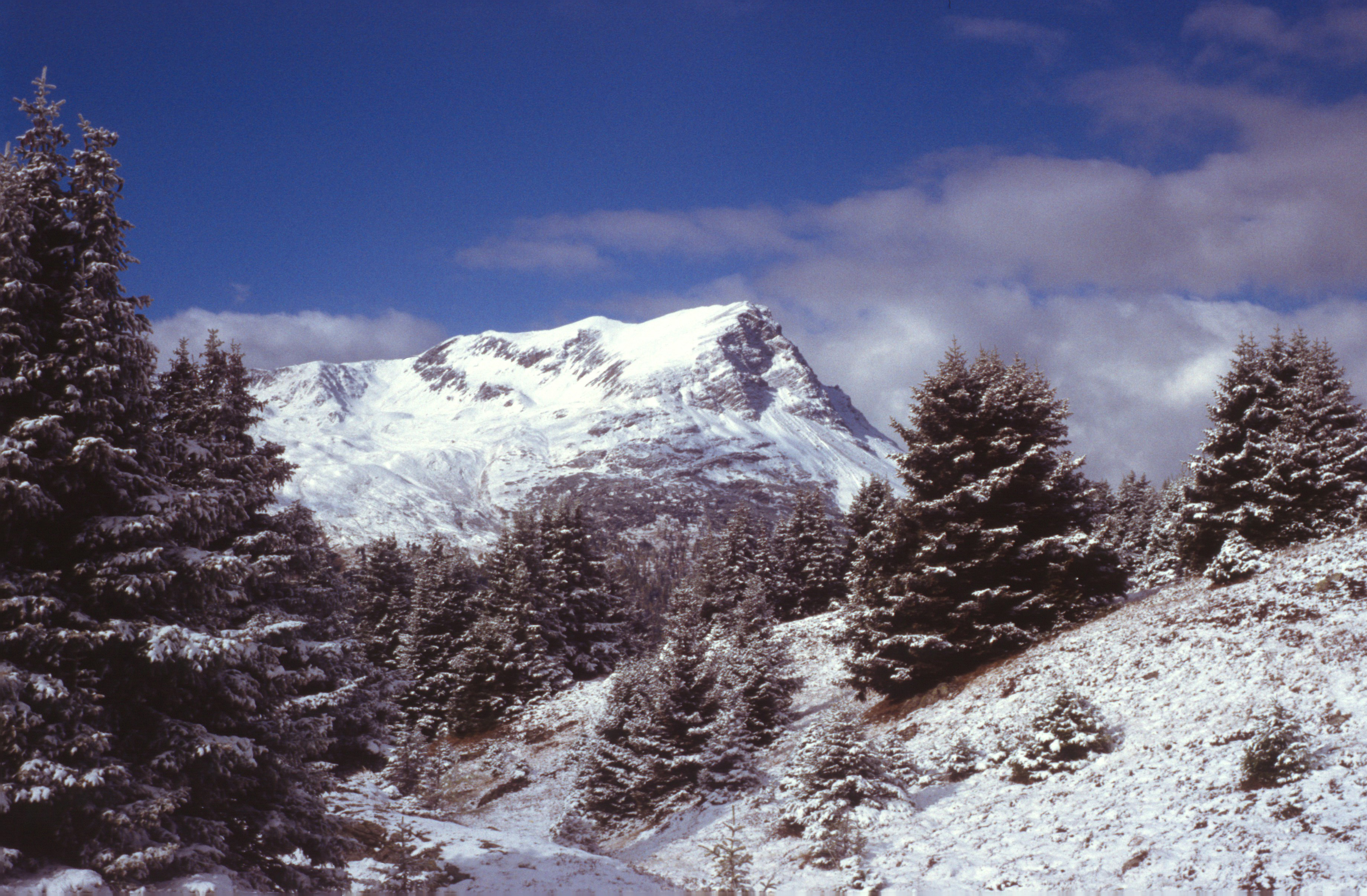
- View from east

Highest point
- Elevation: 2,808 m (9,213 ft)
- Prominence: 232 m (761 ft)
- Parent peak: Piz S-chalembert
- Coordinates: 46°50′52.73″N 10°28′10″E

Geography
- Location within Alps
- Location: Graubünden, Switzerland; South Tyrol, Italy
- Parent range: Sesvenna Range

Piz Lad is a mountain of the Sesvenna Range (Alps), located on the border between Italy and Switzerland. The tripoint between Austria, Italy and Switzerland (2,180 m) is located 800 m north of the summit.
