= Piz Triazza =

Mountain in Switzerland

- Location within Switzerland

Highest point
- Elevation: 3,043 m (9,984 ft)
- Prominence: 68 m (223 ft)
- Parent peak: Piz Lischana
- Coordinates: 46°46′11″N 10°21′29.5″E

Geography
- Location: Graubünden, Switzerland
- Parent range: Sesvenna Range

Piz Triazza (3,043 m) is a mountain in the Sesvenna Range of the Alps, located south-east of Scuol in the canton of Graubünden. It lies on the range east of the Val Triazza.
