= Piz dal Fuorn =

Mountain in Switzerland

- Location within Switzerland

Highest point
- Elevation: 2,906 m (9,534 ft)
- Prominence: 182 m (597 ft)
- Parent peak: Piz Plavna Dadaint
- Coordinates: 46°40′49″N 10°12′47″E

Geography
- Location: Graubünden, Switzerland
- Parent range: Sesvenna Range

Piz dal Fuorn (2,906 m) is a mountain in the Sesvenna Range of the Alps, overlooking Il Fuorn (east of Zernez) in the canton of Graubünden.
