= Piz Madlain =

Mountain in Switzerland

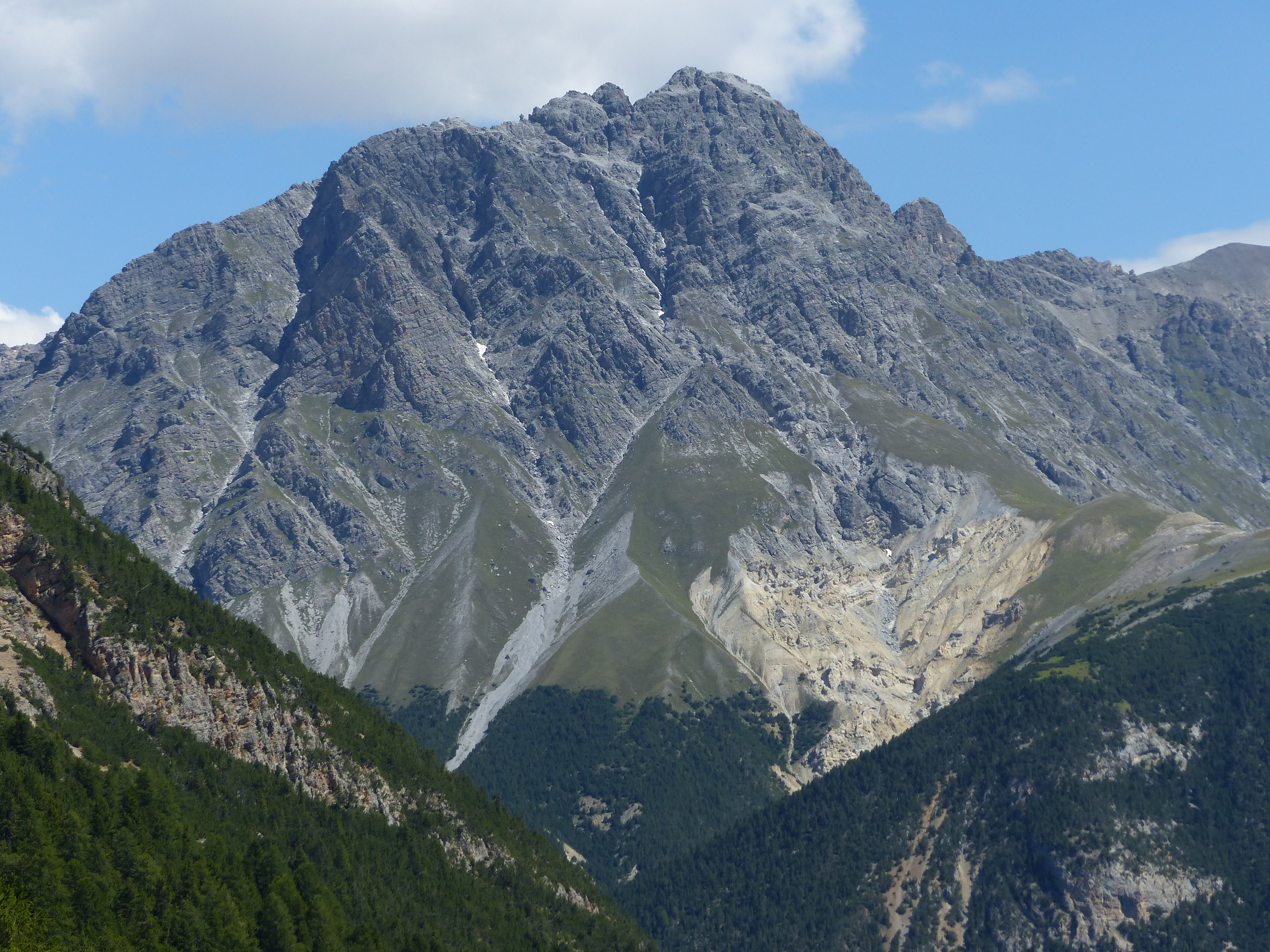
- Piz Madlain.jpg (seen from Alp Tavrü)

Highest point
- Elevation: 3,099 m (10,167 ft)
- Prominence: 159 m (522 ft)
- Parent peak: Piz Lischana
- Coordinates: 46°44′22.7″N 10°20′21″E

Geography
- Location within Switzerland
- Location: Graubünden, Switzerland
- Parent range: Sesvenna Range

Piz Madlain is a mountain in the Sesvenna Range of the Alps, overlooking S-charl in the Swiss canton of Graubünden.
