= Piz Macun =

Mountain of the Swiss Alps

- Location within Switzerland

Highest point
- Elevation: 2,889 m (9,478 ft)
- Prominence: 77 m (253 ft)
- Parent peak: Piz Nuna
- Coordinates: 46°44′2.8″N 10°08′32.4″E

Geography
- Location: Graubünden, Switzerland
- Parent range: Sesvenna Range

Piz Macun is a mountain in the Sesvenna Range of the Alps, located south of Lavin in the canton of Graubünden. It overlooks the plateau of Macun on its southern side.
