= Piz S-chalambert =

Mountain in Switzerland

Piz S-chalembert
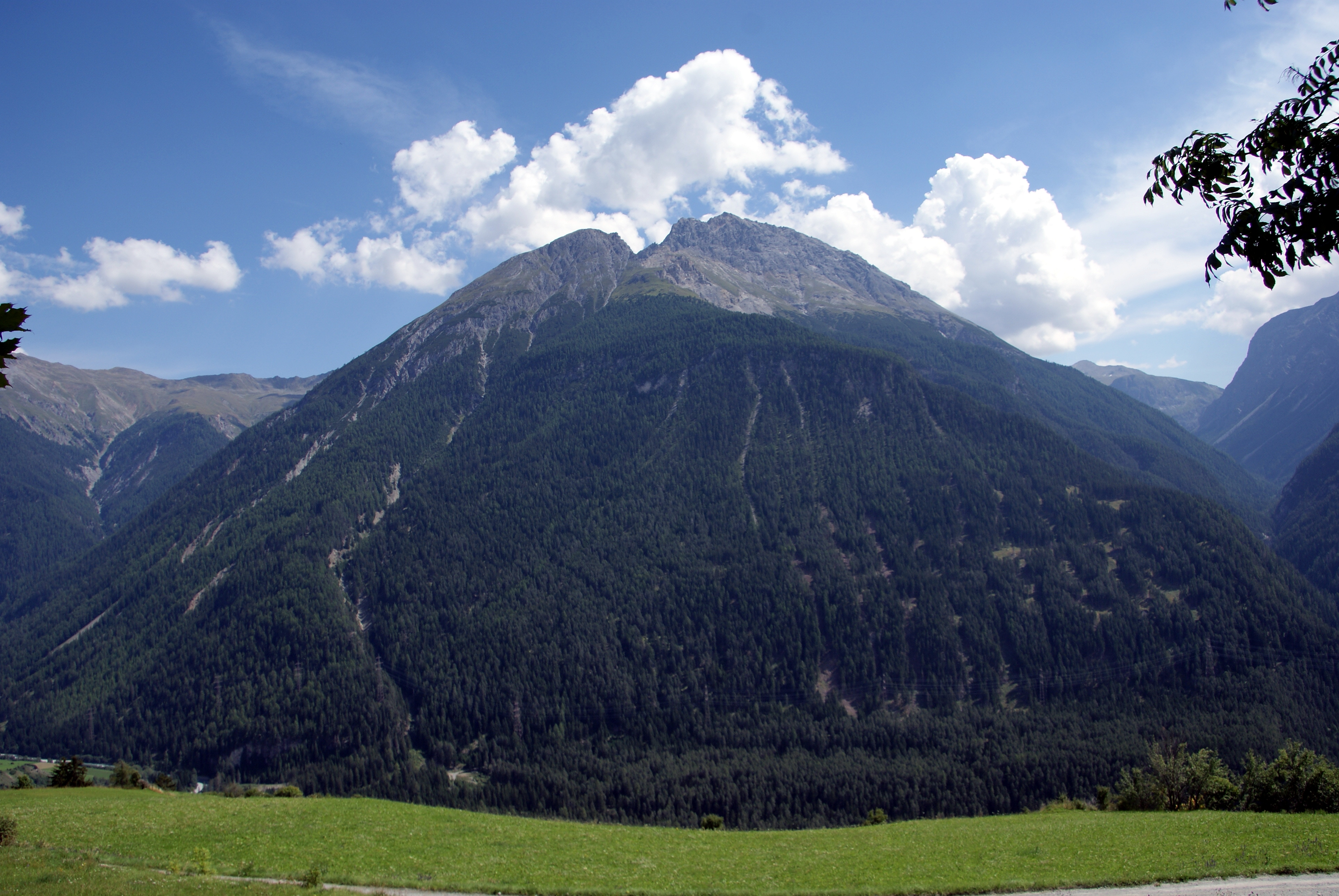
- Piz S-chalembert from the northwest side

Highest point
- Elevation: 3,031 m (9,944 ft)
- Prominence: 722 m (2,369 ft)
- Parent peak: Piz Sesvenna
- Listing: Alpine mountains above 3000 m
- Coordinates: 46°48′3.5″N 10°24′48″E

Geography
- Location within Switzerland
- Location: Graubünden, Switzerland
- Parent range: Sesvenna Range

Piz S-chalembert is a mountain in the Sesvenna Range of the Alps, overlooking Ramosch in the canton of Graubünden. With a height of 3,031 metres above sea level, it is the highest summit of the group east of the Schlinigpass.

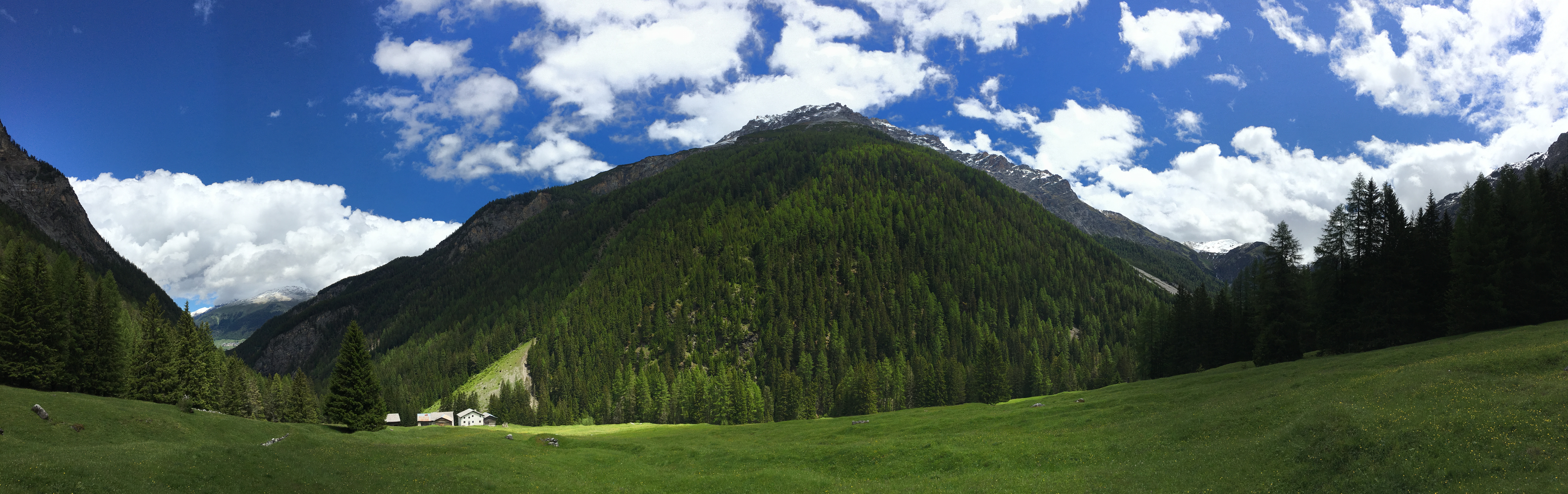
Piz S-chalembert from Val d'Uina

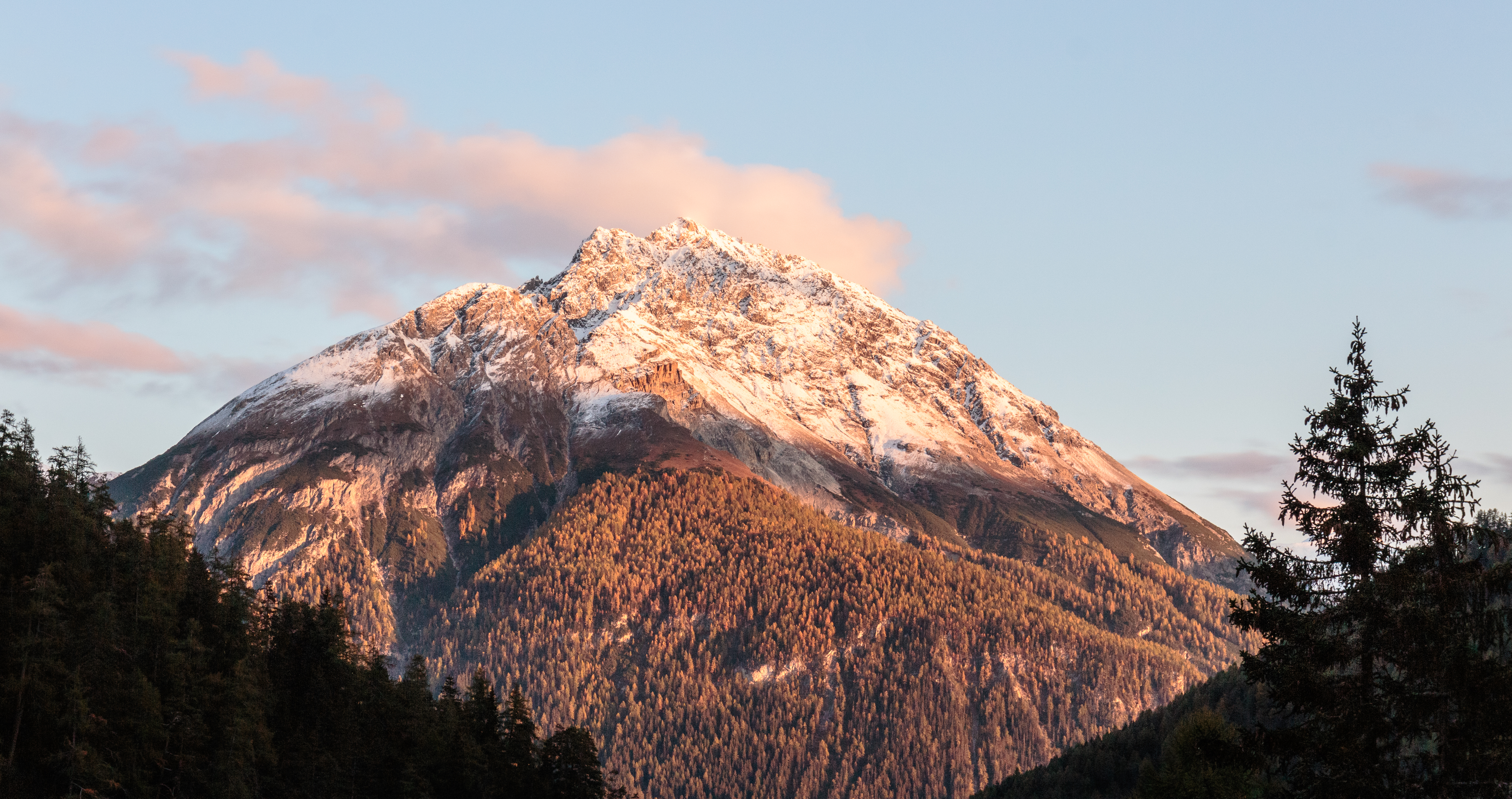
View from Val Sinestra.
