= Piz San Jon =

Mountain in Switzerland

- Piz San Jon Dadaint
- Location within Switzerland

Highest point
- Elevation: 3,093 m (10,148 ft)
- Prominence: 148 m (486 ft)
- Parent peak: Piz Madlain
- Coordinates: 46°45′12″N 10°20′21″E

Geography
- Location: Graubünden, Switzerland
- Parent range: Sesvenna Range

Piz San Jon is a mountain in the Sesvenna Range of the Alps, located south of Scuol in the canton of Graubünden. It is composed of three summits: Piz San Jon Dadaint (3,093 m), Piz San Jon d'Immez (3,065 m) and Piz San Jon Dadora (3,048 m). All are located on the range between the Val S-charl and the Val Lischana.
