= Piz Nair (disambiguation) =

Piz Nair (from Romansh: black peak) is the name of several mountains in Switzerland:

- Piz Nair, near St. Moritz
- Piz Nair (Glarus Alps), near Sedrun
- Piz Nair (Sesvenna Alps), in the Swiss National Park
- Schwarzberg (Lepontine Alps), between the cantons of Uri and Graubünden
