= Piz d'Arpiglias =

Mountain in Switzerland

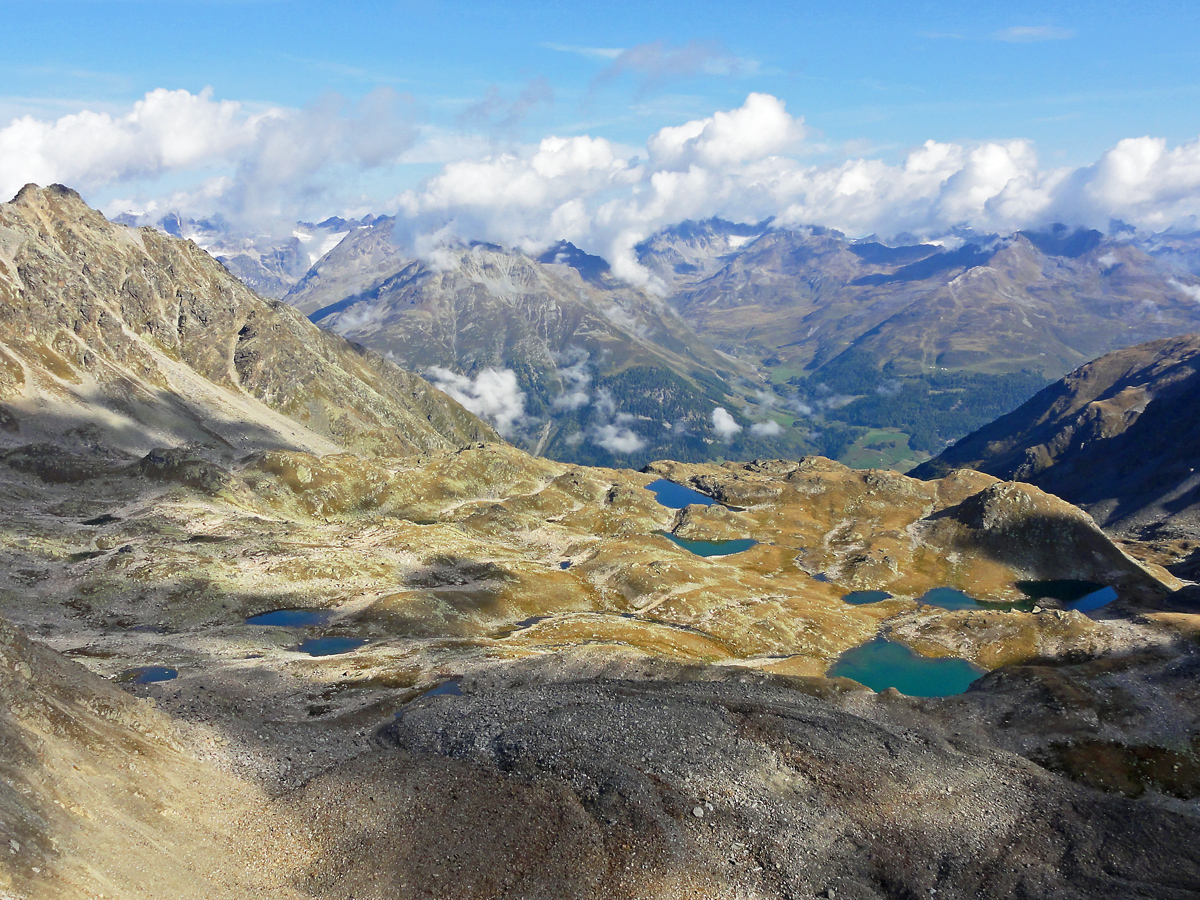
- Piz d'Arpiglias (far-left) and the plateau of Macun

Highest point
- Elevation: 3,027 m (9,931 ft)
- Prominence: 188 m (617 ft)
- Parent peak: Piz Nuna
- Listing: Mountains of Switzerland
- Coordinates: 46°44′3.4″N 10°7′3.6″E

Geography
- Location within Switzerland
- Location: Graubünden, Switzerland
- Parent range: Sesvenna Range

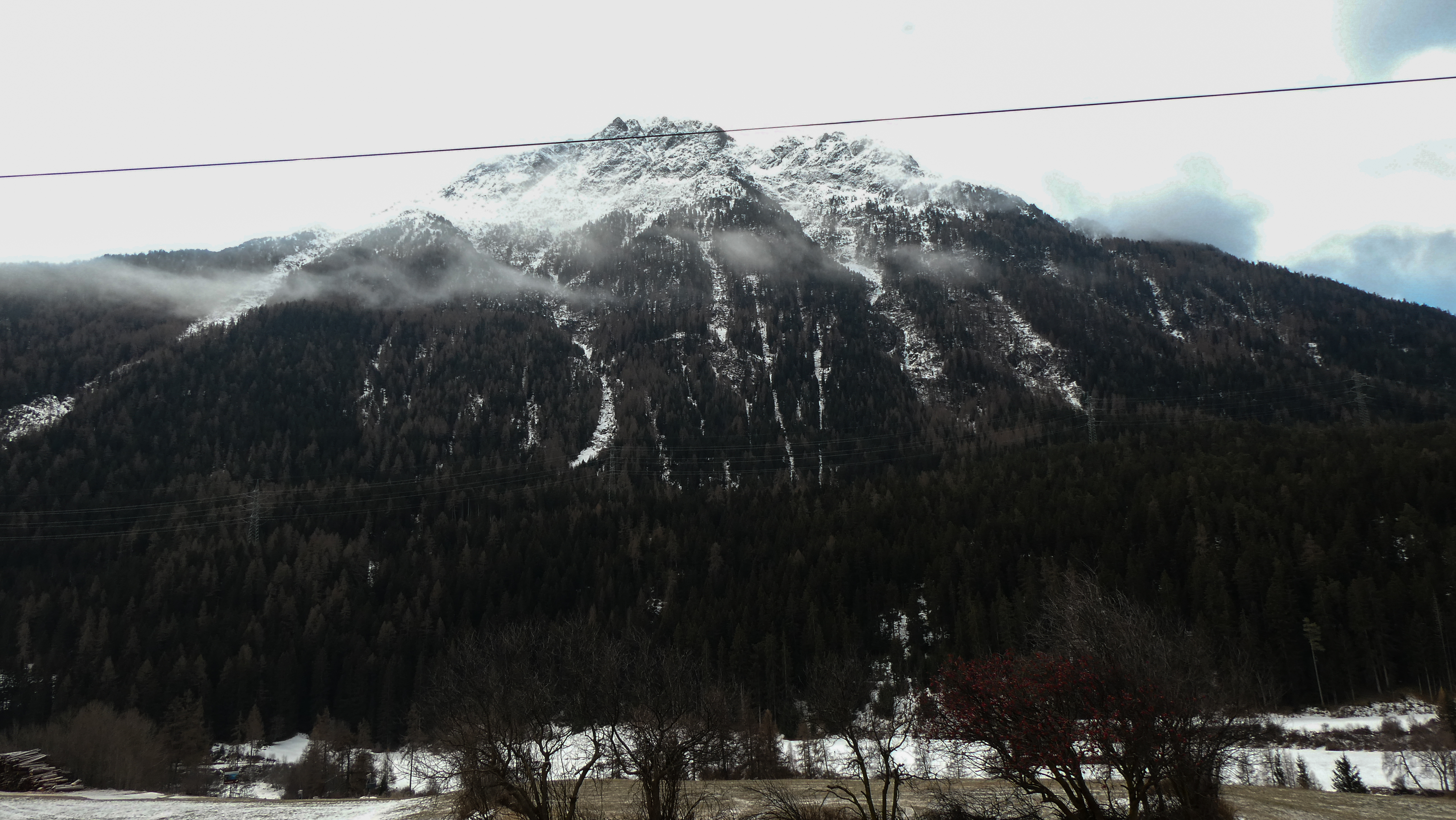
Piz d'Arpiglias as seen from Sagliains railway station

Piz d'Arpiglias is a mountain of the Sesvenna Range of the Alps, located east of Susch in the canton of Graubünden. Its eastern side is part of the Swiss National Park (Macun Seeplatte).
