= Piz Sampuoir =

Mountain in Switzerland

- Location within Switzerland

Highest point
- Elevation: 3,023 m (9,918 ft)
- Prominence: 148 m (486 ft)
- Parent peak: Piz Laschadurella
- Coordinates: 46°41′44″N 10°13′01″E

Geography
- Location: Graubünden, Switzerland
- Parent range: Sesvenna Range

Piz Sampuoir (3,023 m) is a mountain in the Sesvenna Range of the Alps, located north of Il Fuorn (east of Zernez) in the canton of Graubünden. Its summit is the tripoint between the Val Sampuoir, the Val dal Spöl and the Val Plavna.
