= Piz Nair (Sesvenna Alps) =

Mountain in Switzerland

- View from the south side

Highest point
- Elevation: 3,010 m (9,880 ft)
- Prominence: 238 m (781 ft)
- Parent peak: Piz Tavrü
- Coordinates: 46°40′4.6″N 10°16′21.2″E

Geography
- Location within Switzerland
- Location: Graubünden, Switzerland
- Parent range: Sesvenna Alps

Piz Nair is a mountain in the Sesvenna Alps, located north of the Fuorn Pass in the canton of Graubünden.

The mountain is part of the Swiss National Park.
