= Piz Starlex =

Mountain in Switzerland

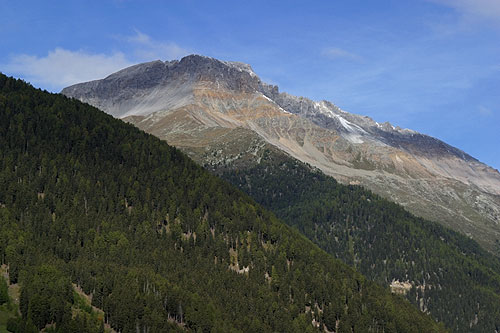
- The east side

Highest point
- Elevation: 3,075 m (10,089 ft)
- Prominence: 779 m (2,556 ft)
- Parent peak: Piz Sesvenna
- Listing: Alpine mountains above 3000 m
- Coordinates: 46°39′47″N 10°23′33″E

Geography
- Location within Alps
- Location: Graubünden, Switzerland; South Tyrol, Italy
- Parent range: Sesvenna Range

Piz Starlex is a mountain in the Sesvenna Range of the Alps, located on the border between Italy and Switzerland. It lies south of Piz Sesvenna.
