= Piz Tavrü =

Mountain in Switzerland

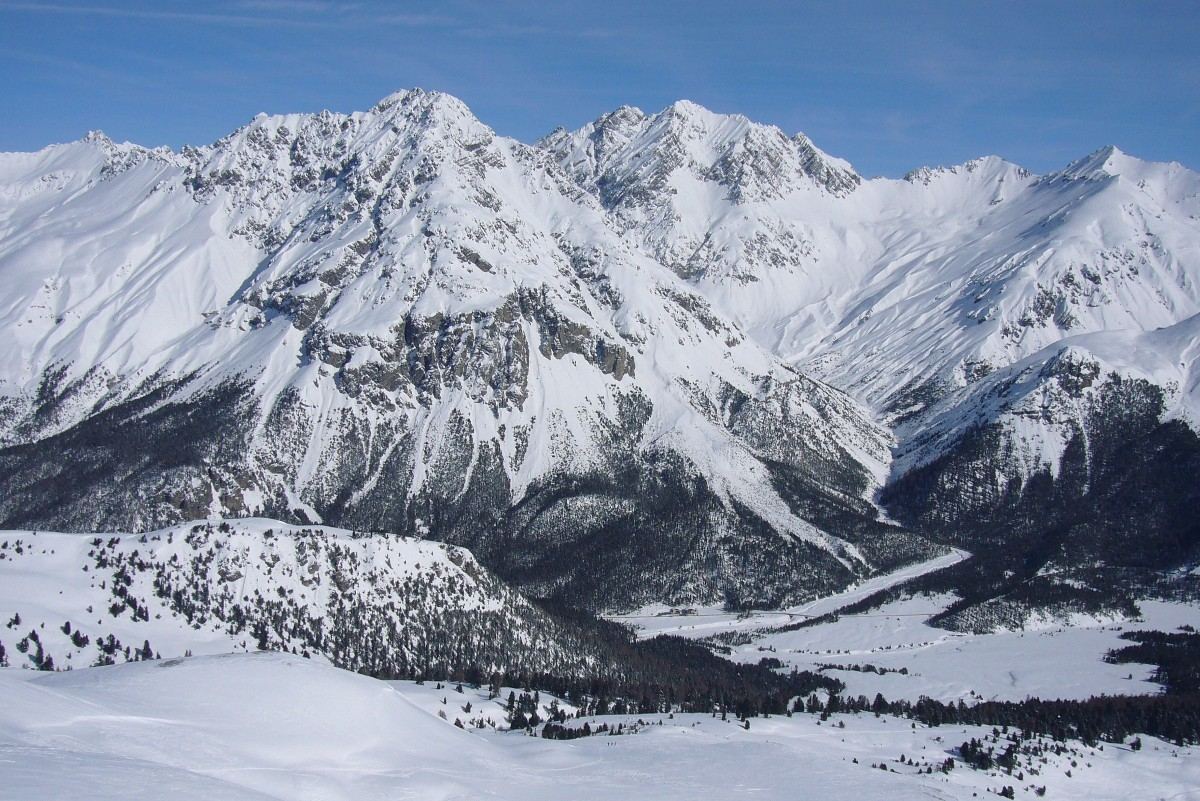
- View of Piz Nair (centre-left) and Piz Tavrü (centre-right) from the south

Highest point
- Elevation: 3,168 m (10,394 ft)
- Prominence: 851 m (2,792 ft)
- Parent peak: Piz Pisoc
- Listing: Alpine mountains above 3000 m
- Coordinates: 46°40′45″N 10°17′45″E

Geography
- Location within Switzerland
- Location: Graubünden, Switzerland
- Parent range: Sesvenna Range

Piz Tavrü is a mountain in the Sesvenna Range of the Alps, located north of the Ofen Pass in the canton of Graubünden. Its southern side is part of the Swiss National Park.
