= Piz Laschadurella =

Mountain in Switzerland

- Location within Switzerland

Highest point
- Elevation: 3,046 m (9,993 ft)
- Prominence: 206 m (676 ft)
- Parent peak: Piz Plavna Dadaint
- Coordinates: 46°41′53.5″N 10°11′45.5″E

Geography
- Location: Graubünden, Switzerland
- Parent range: Sesvenna Range

Piz Laschadurella is a mountain in the Sesvenna Range of the Alps, located east of Zernez in the canton of Graubünden. Its southern side is part of the Swiss National Park.
