= Piz Nuna =

Mountain in Switzerland

- Location within Switzerland

Highest point
- Elevation: 3,124 m (10,249 ft)
- Prominence: 535 m (1,755 ft)
- Parent peak: Piz Tavrü
- Listing: Alpine mountains above 3000 m
- Coordinates: 46°43′24″N 10°9′16″E

Geography
- Location: Graubünden, Switzerland
- Parent range: Sesvenna Range

Piz Nuna is a mountain in the Sesvenna Range of the Alps, located northeast of Zernez in the canton of Graubünden. Its summit (3,124 m) is the tripoint between the valley of Val Nuna, Val Sampuoir and Val Laschadura.
