= Piz Plavna Dadaint =

Mountain in Switzerland

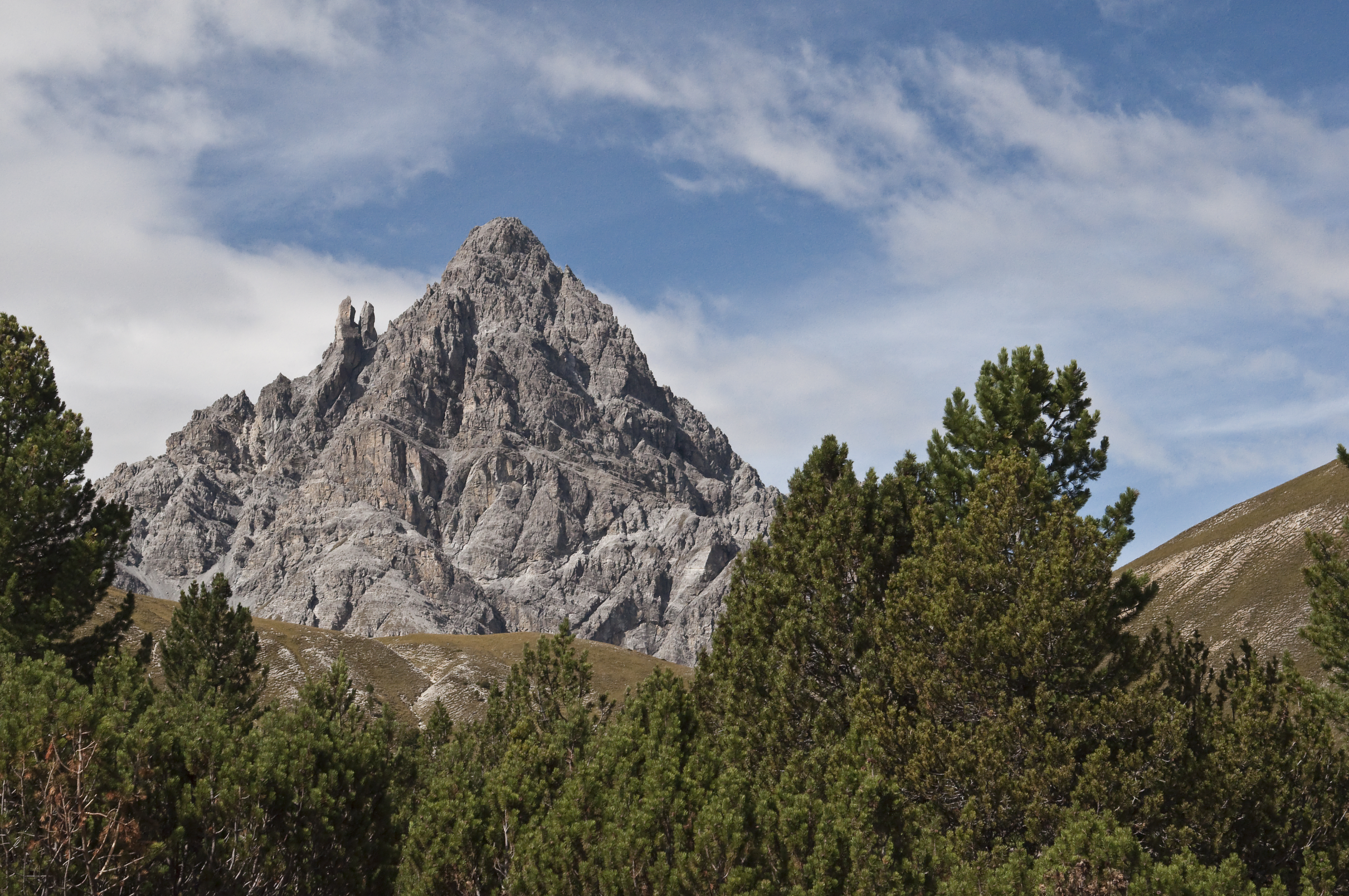
- View from Sur il Foss (east side)

Highest point
- Elevation: 3,167 m (10,390 ft)
- Prominence: 490 m (1,610 ft)
- Parent peak: Piz Tavrü
- Listing: Alpine mountains above 3000 m
- Coordinates: 46°42′31″N 10°13′25.6″E

Geography
- Location within Switzerland
- Location: Graubünden, Switzerland
- Parent range: Sesvenna Range

Piz Plavna Dadaint is a mountain in the Sesvenna Range of the Alps, located between the Val Sampuoir and the Val Plavna in the canton of Graubünden.
