= Piz Lischana =

Mountain in Switzerland

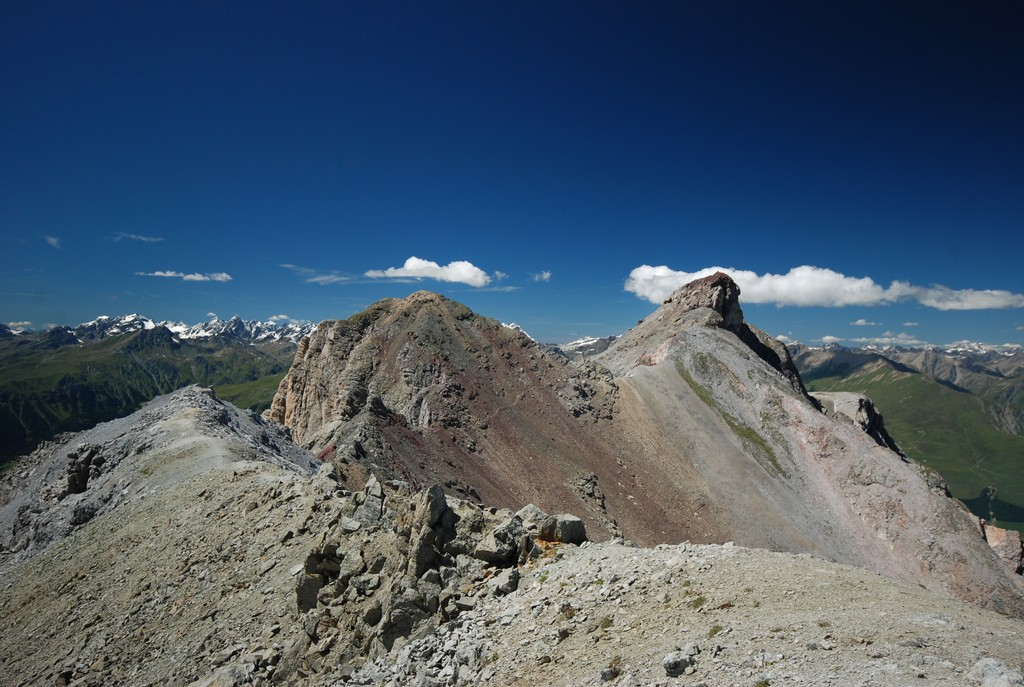
- The South-East ridge to the summit, viewed from pt 3044.

Highest point
- Elevation: 3,105 m (10,187 ft)
- Prominence: 286 m (938 ft)
- Coordinates: 46°46′10.6″N 10°20′41.5″E

Geography
- Location within Switzerland
- Location: Graubünden, Switzerland
- Parent range: Sesvenna Range

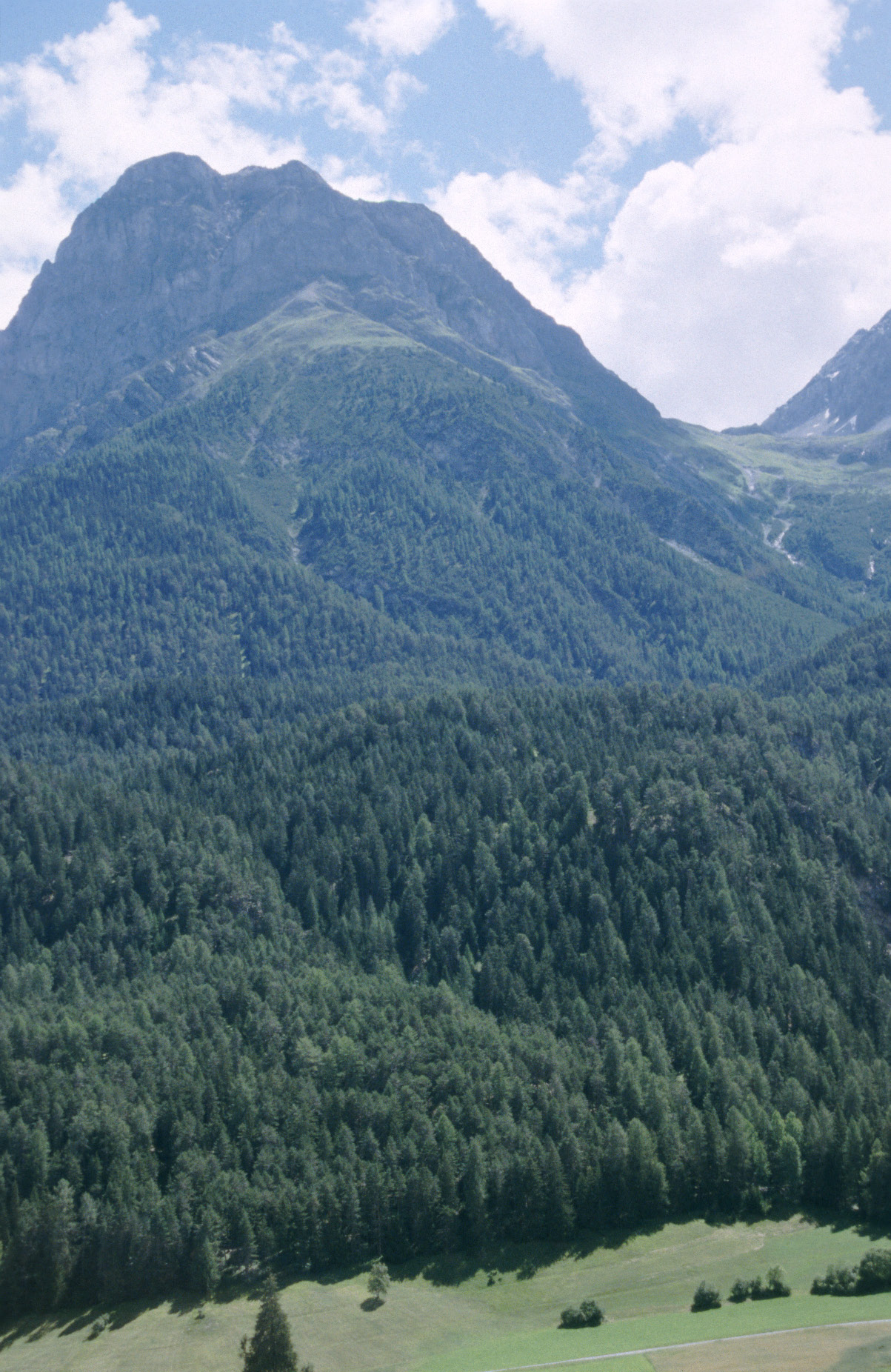
North-west side

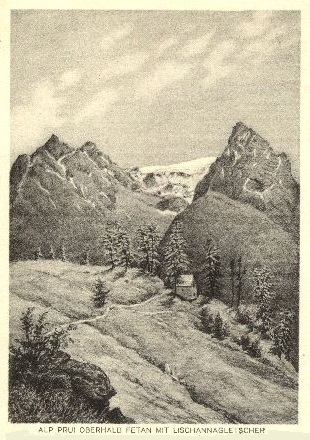
Ancient Lischana glacier, as seen from Ftan, 1922. Piz Lischana to its left, Piz San Jon to its right.

Piz Lischana is a mountain in the Sesvenna Range of the Alps, overlooking Scuol in the Swiss canton of Graubünden. With an elevation of 3,105 metres above sea level, Piz Lischana is the highest summit of the Sesvenna Range north of the Fuorcla Sesvenna (2,819 metres).

The normal route of ascent is from the Chamanna Lischana a mountain hut operated by the Swiss Alpine Club, to the Fuorcla de Rims (2940 m), a col at the low point between Piz Lischana and Piz San Jon, and then along the South-East ridge of the mountain passing over the intermediate summit at pt. 3044. The route is graded T3+ or T4 in the Swiss Hiking Scale. The final section of this route can also be reached from S-charl via the Fora dal'Aua and via the Val d'Uina, but these routes are longer and involve more ascent. Other routes to the summit involve technical climbing.

A substantial rock fall from the summit pyramid into the Val de Triazza was recorded on camera by a party who had just left the summit on July 31, 2011. It is estimated that 2000 cubic metres of rock fell. The route from the saddle below the summit was assessed by the local authorities and re-routed with prominent red dot route marks to avoid the areas prone to further rock falls.

During the last quarter of the 20th century the Vadret de Lischana plateau glacier covered the 4 km^{2} plateau between Piz Lischana and the Lai da Rims. The ice has disappeared except for two relics, the small glacier Vadret de Triazza below the South-East ridge and one which retains the original name below Piz San Jon.
