= Piz Pisoc =

Mountain in Switzerland

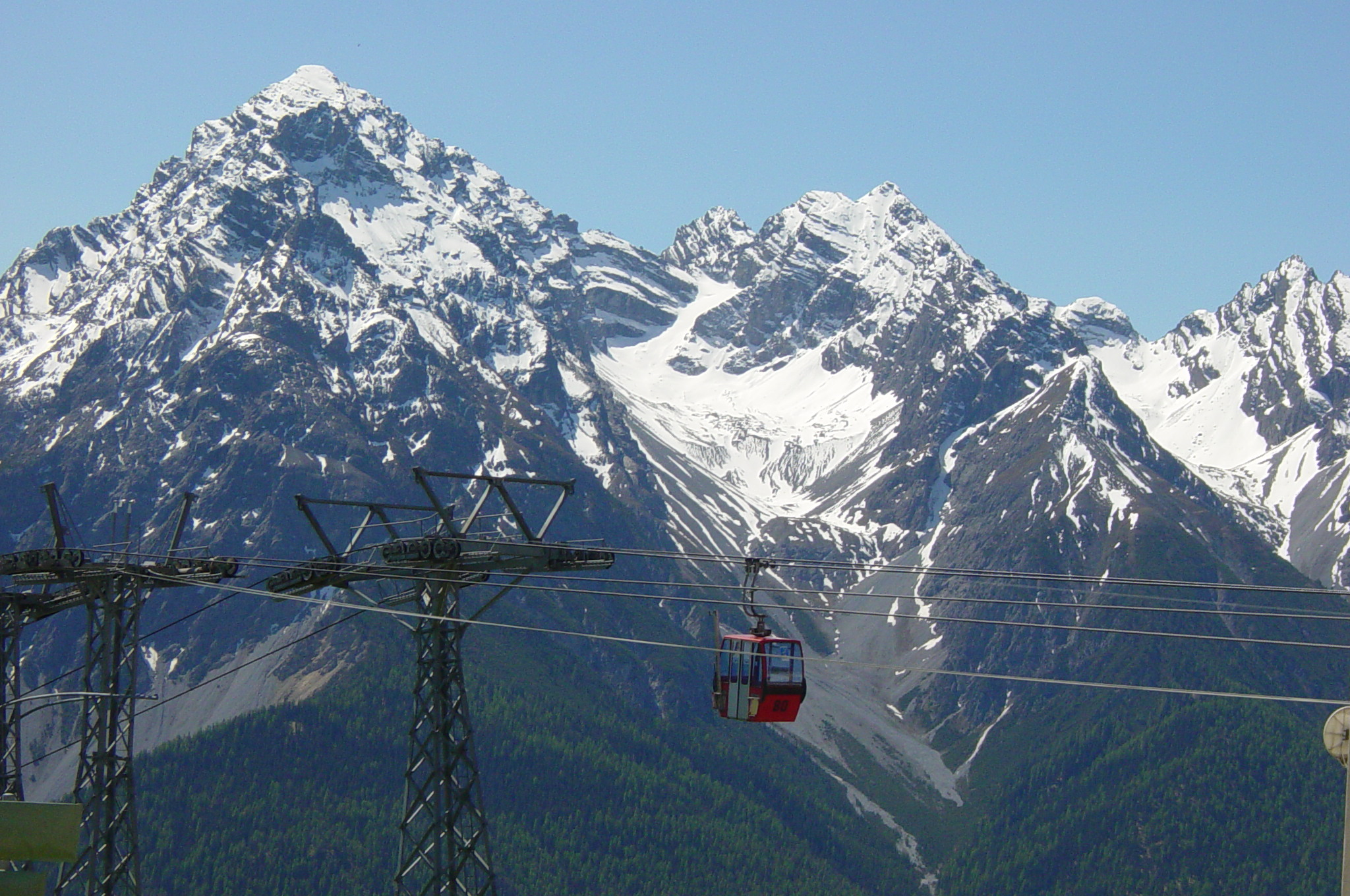
- Piz Pisoc (left) from above Scuol

Highest point
- Elevation: 3,173 m (10,410 ft)
- Prominence: 922 m (3,025 ft)
- Parent peak: Piz Sesvenna
- Isolation: 10.3 km (6.4 mi)
- Listing: Alpine mountains above 3000 m
- Coordinates: 46°44′40.2″N 10°16′47.1″E

Geography
- Location within Switzerland
- Location: Graubünden, Switzerland
- Parent range: Sesvenna Range

Piz Pisoc is a mountain in the Sesvenna Range of the Alps, overlooking Tarasp in the Swiss canton of Graubünden. With an elevation of 3,173 metres above sea level, it is the highest summit of the Sesvenna Range west of Pass Costainas (2,251 metres) and the second highest summit of the whole range.

The east side of Piz Pisoc is part of the Swiss National Park.

== See also ==
- List of mountains of Graubünden
- List of most isolated mountains of Switzerland
