= Piz Sesvenna =

Mountain in Switzerland

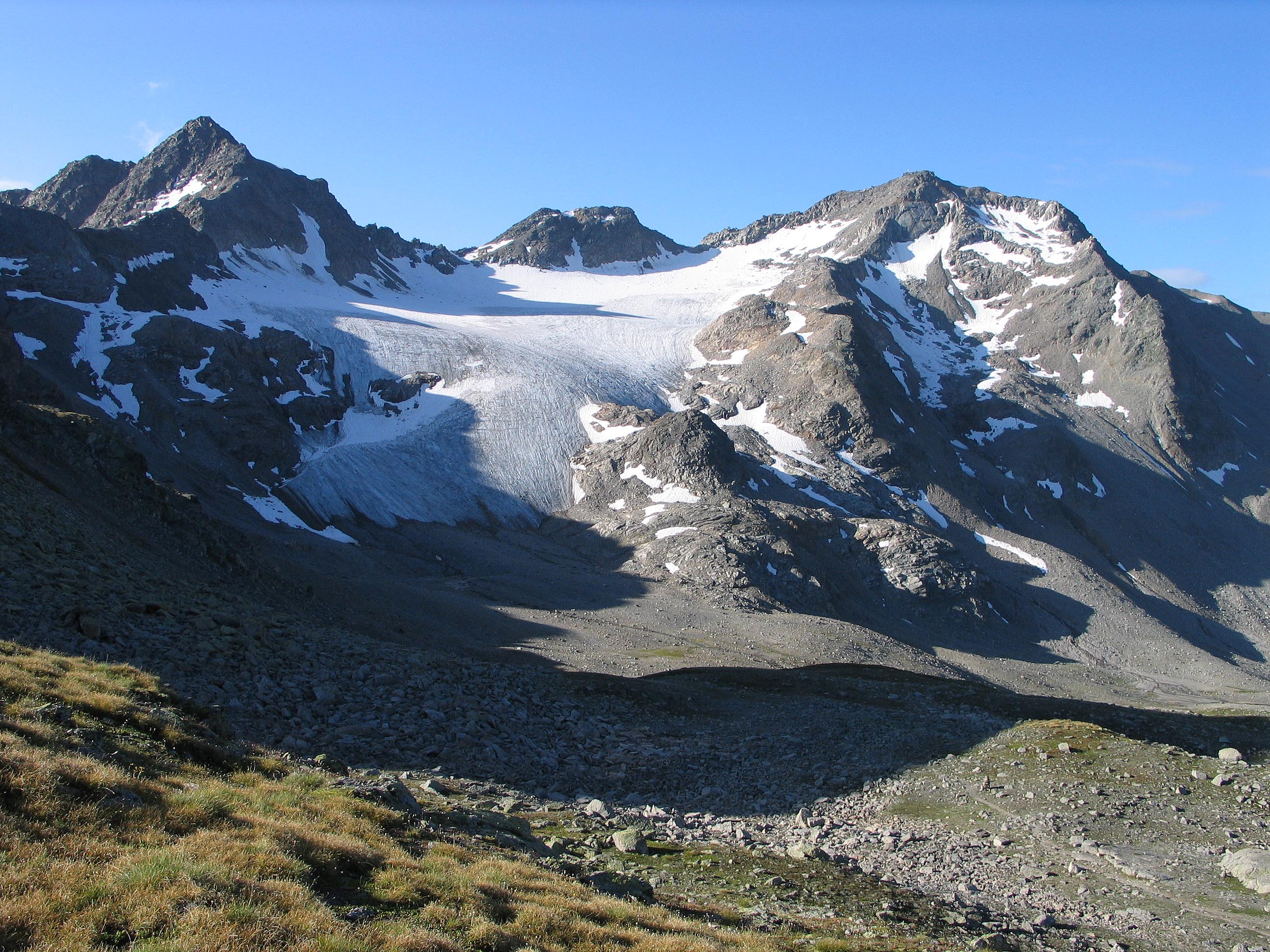
- Muntpitschen and Piz Sesvenna

Highest point
- Elevation: 3,204 m (10,512 ft)
- Prominence: 1,055 m (3,461 ft)
- Parent peak: Ortler
- Isolation: 21.5 km (13.4 mi)
- Listing: Alpine mountains above 3000 m
- Coordinates: 46°42′21.7″N 10°24′10.6″E

Geography
- Location within Switzerland
- Location: Graubünden, Switzerland (mountain partially in Italy)
- Parent range: Sesvenna Range

Piz Sesvenna is the highest mountain in the Sesvenna Range of the Alps. It lies between the Swiss canton of Graubünden and the Italian region of South Tyrol. The summit is located within Switzerland, very close to the Italian border and main watershed.

On the northern side of Piz Sesvenna lies a glacier named Vadret da Sesvenna.

The closest locality is S-charl, south of Scuol in the Engadin valley.

== See also ==
- List of most isolated mountains of Switzerland
