= Fuorn Pass =

Alpine mountain pass in Switzerland

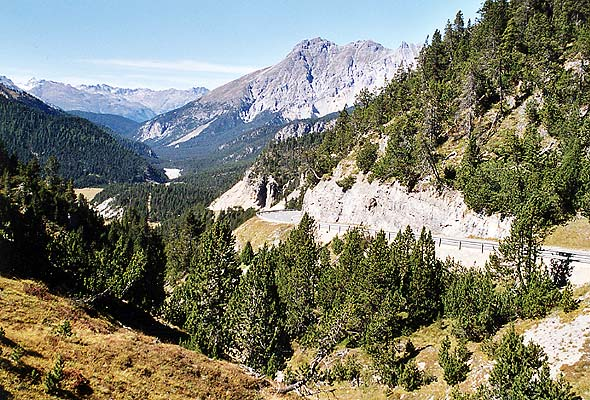
- Fuorn Pass

- Location within Switzerland
- Elevation: 2,149 m (7,051 ft)
- Traversed by: Road 28

Location
- Location: Graubünden, Switzerland
- Range: Alps
- Coordinates: 46°38′23″N 10°17′32″E

Fuorn Pass or Ofen Pass (Romansh: Pass dal Fuorn, German: Ofenpass, Italian: Passo del Forno) (el. 2149 m.) is a high alpine mountain pass in the canton of Graubünden in Switzerland. The name is based on the ovens/furnaces that were used in ironworks in the area. The ruins of these ovens can still be seen from nearby trails.

It connects Zernez in the Engadin valley with Val Müstair, crossing the Swiss National Park in Switzerland.

It was here that a brown bear (Ursus arctos) was seen and photographed in July 2005 - the first sighting of a wild bear in Switzerland since 1923

In 2004, the biggest Honey fungus spotted in Europe was found near the Pass. The fungus is about 1,000 years old and its diameter is estimated at 500 to 800 meters.

== See also ==
- List of highest paved roads in Europe
- List of mountain passes
- List of the highest Swiss passes

== Gallery ==
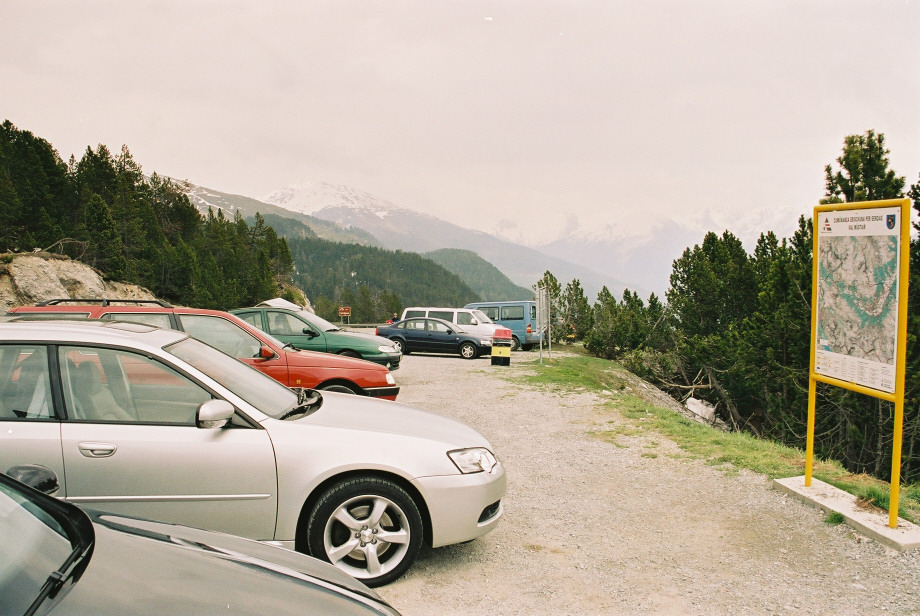

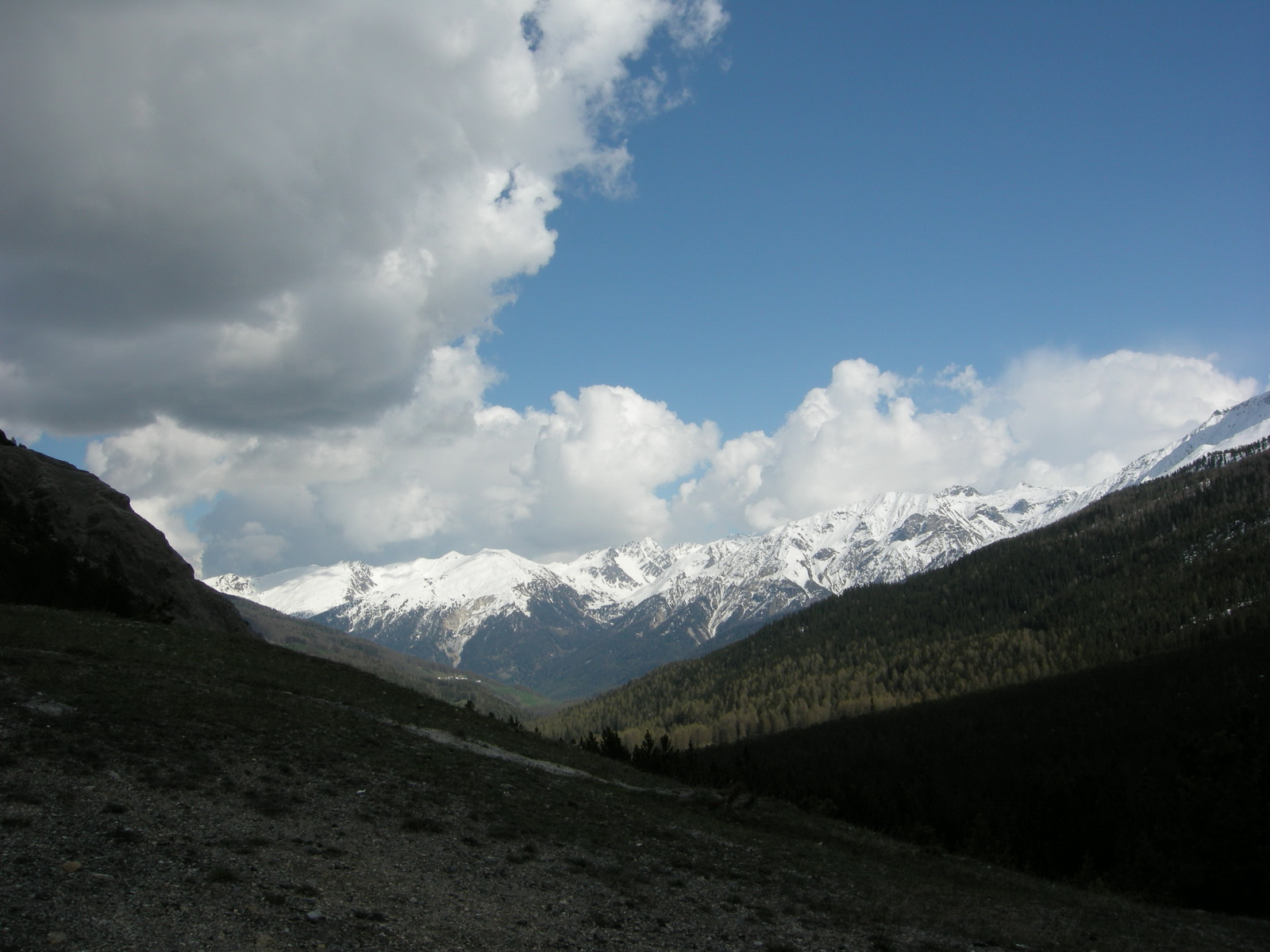

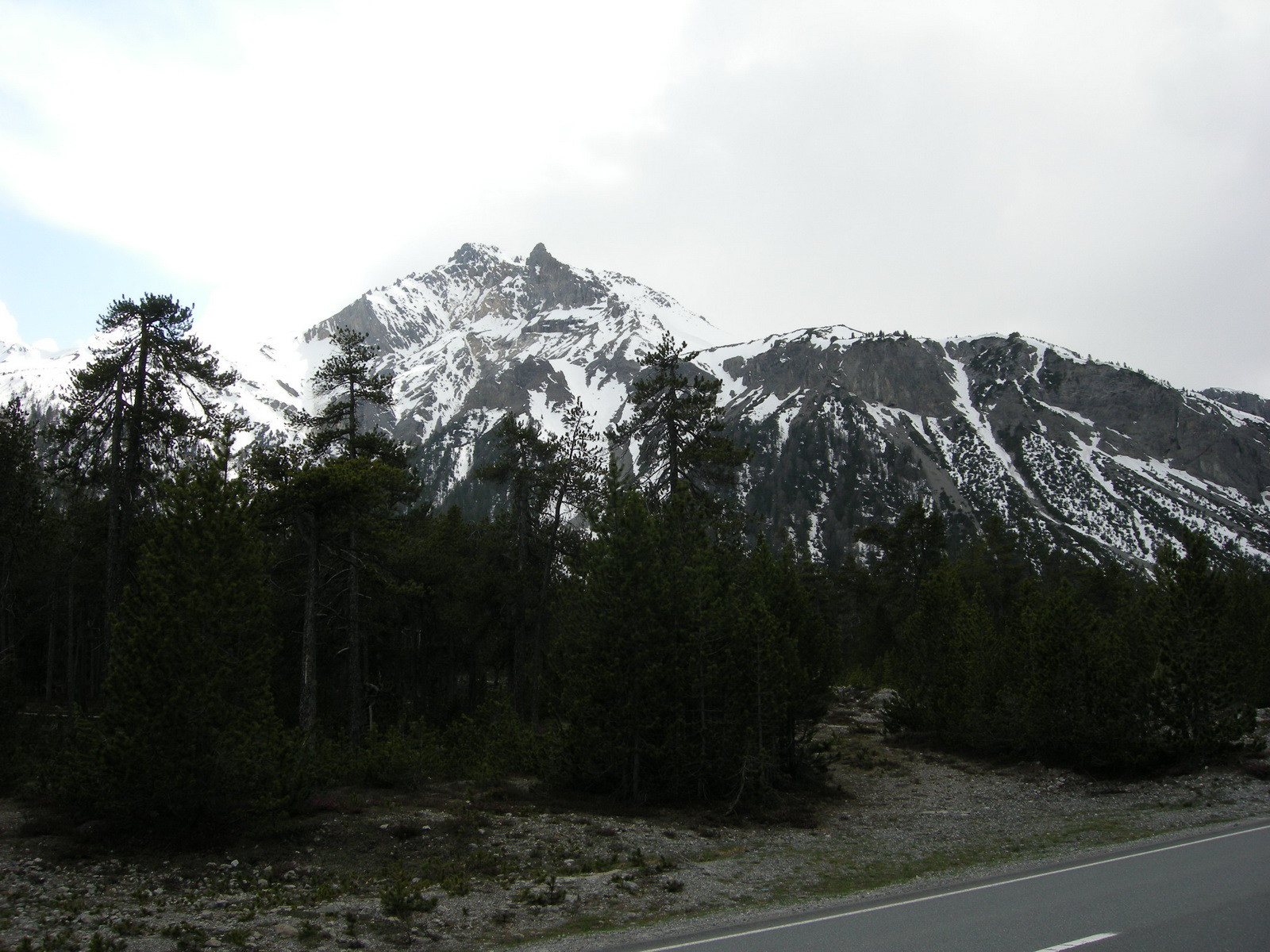

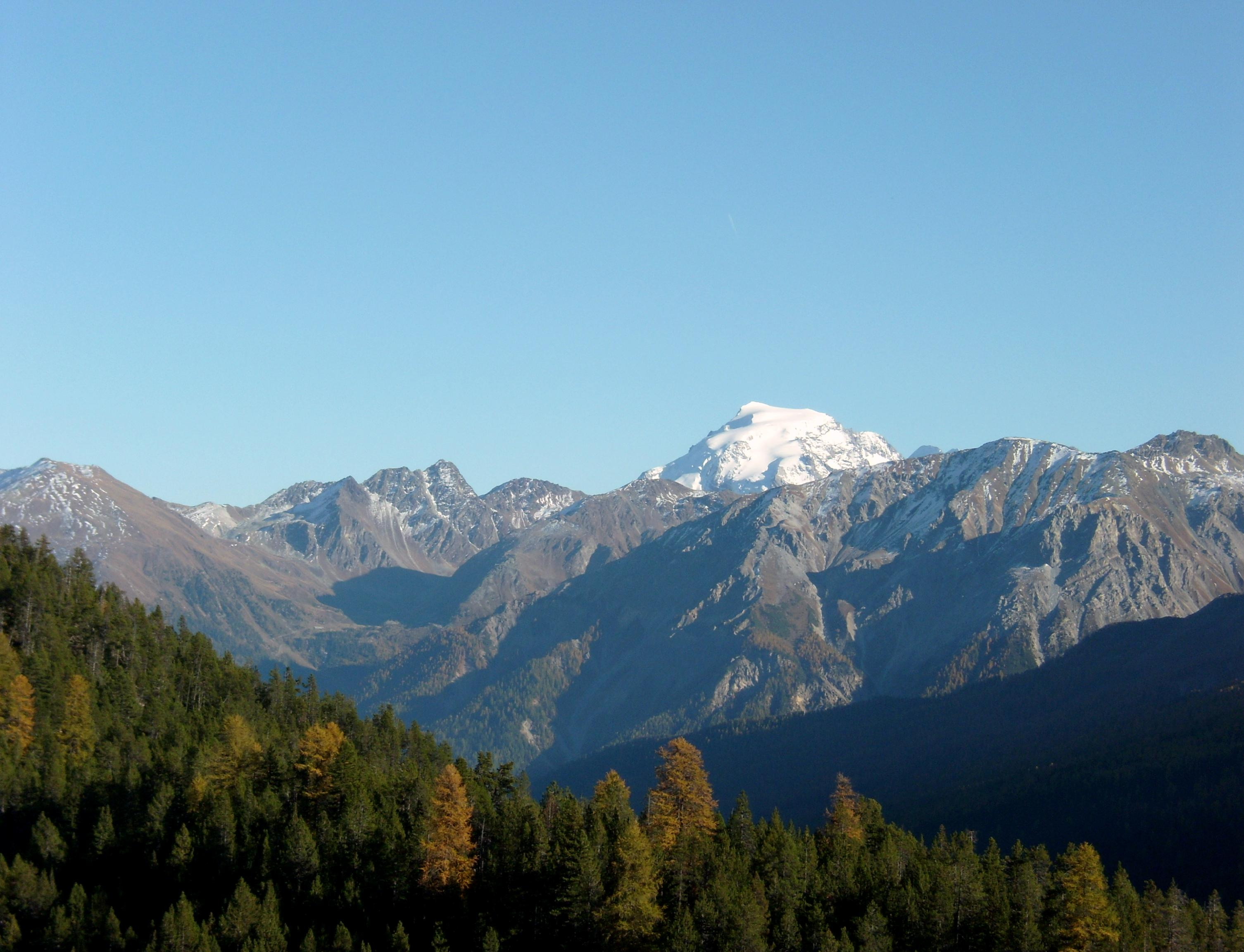
The Ortler, East of the Fuorn Pass
