= S-charl =

Village in Switzerland

Coordinates: 46°43′N 10°20′E

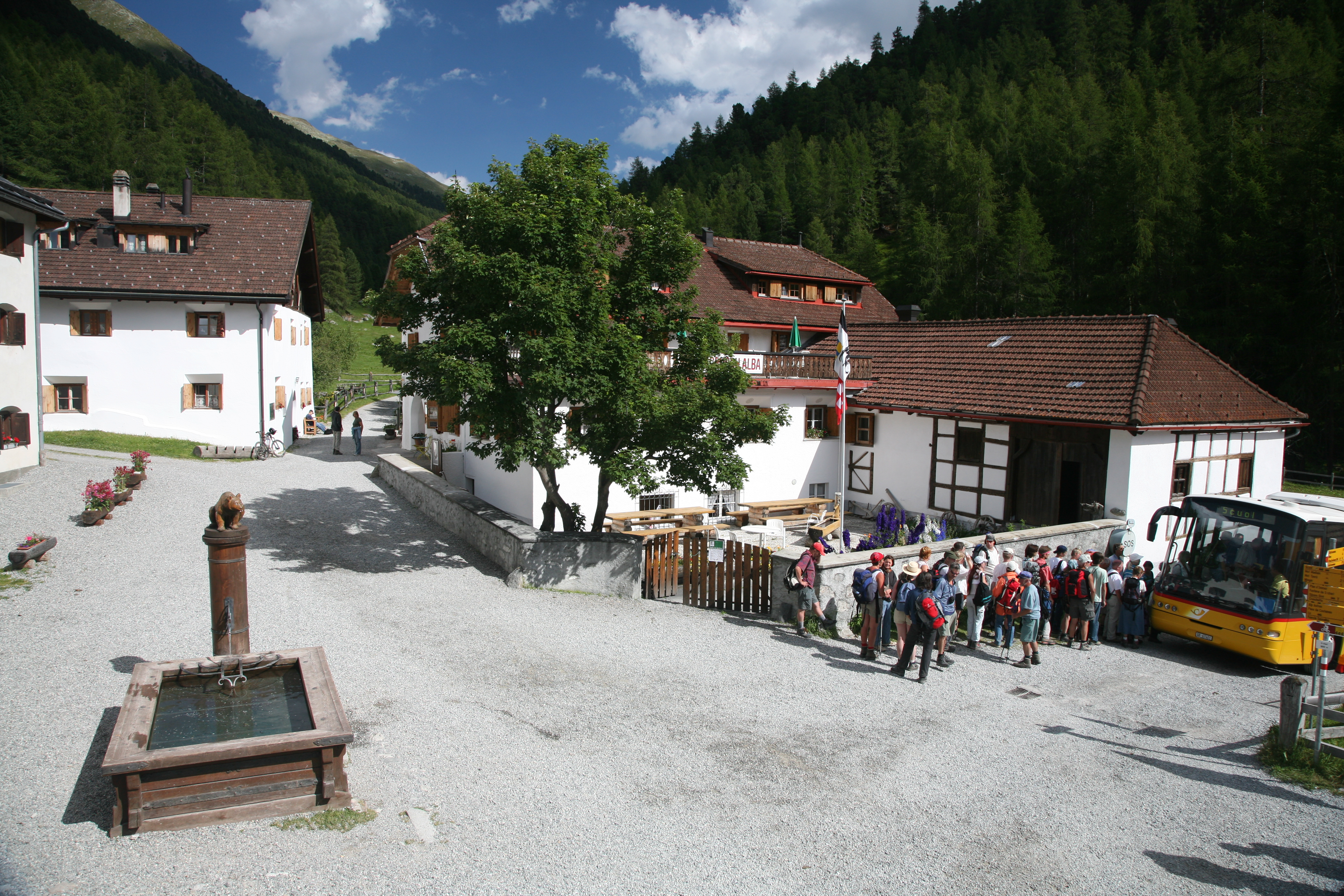
S-charl

S-charl is a village in the municipality of Scuol, located in the canton of Graubünden, Switzerland. The village lies in the Engadin region, at 1,810 metres in the Val S-charl south of Scuol, in the Sesvenna Range (Swiss Alps).

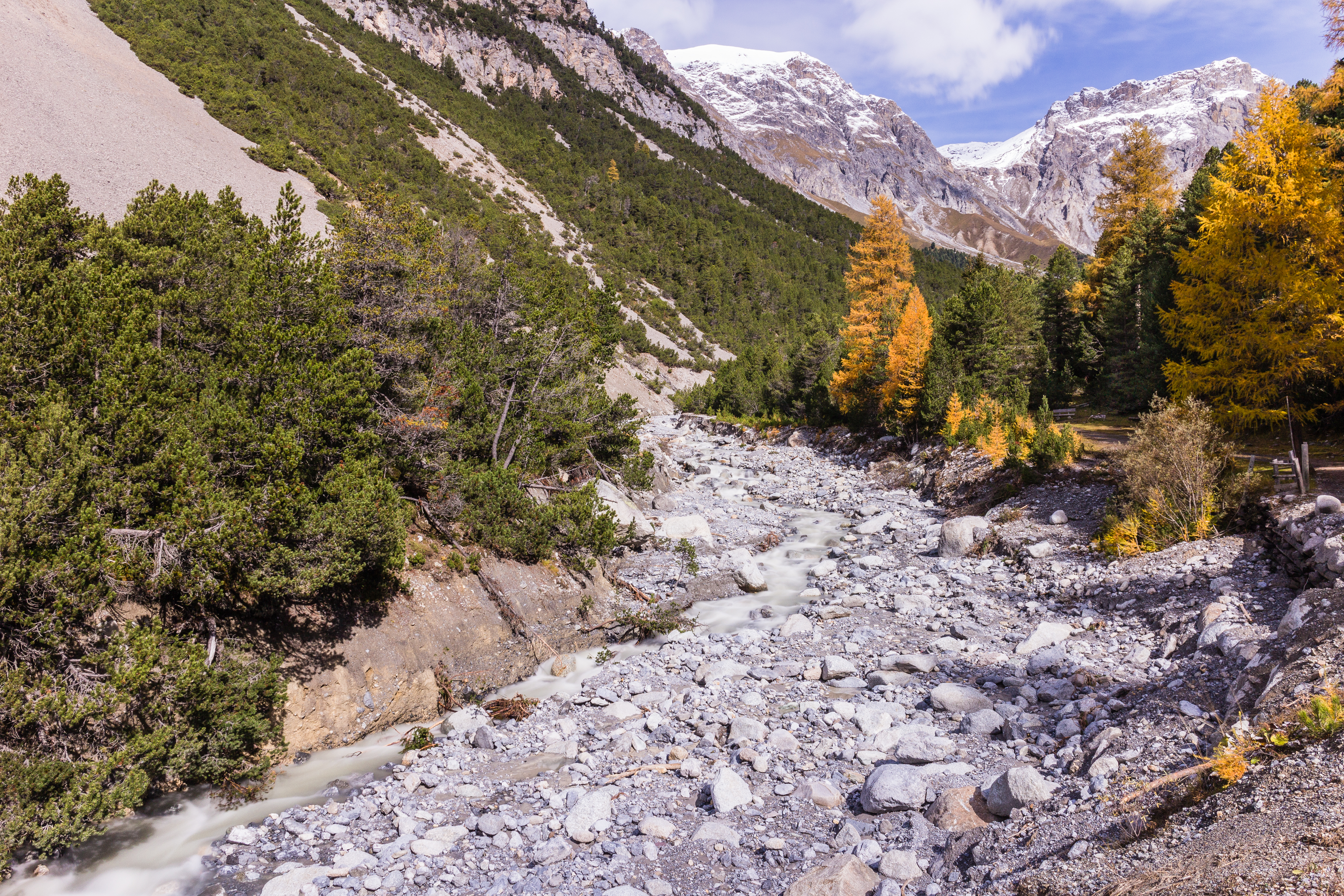
S-charl towards Alp Sesvenna.

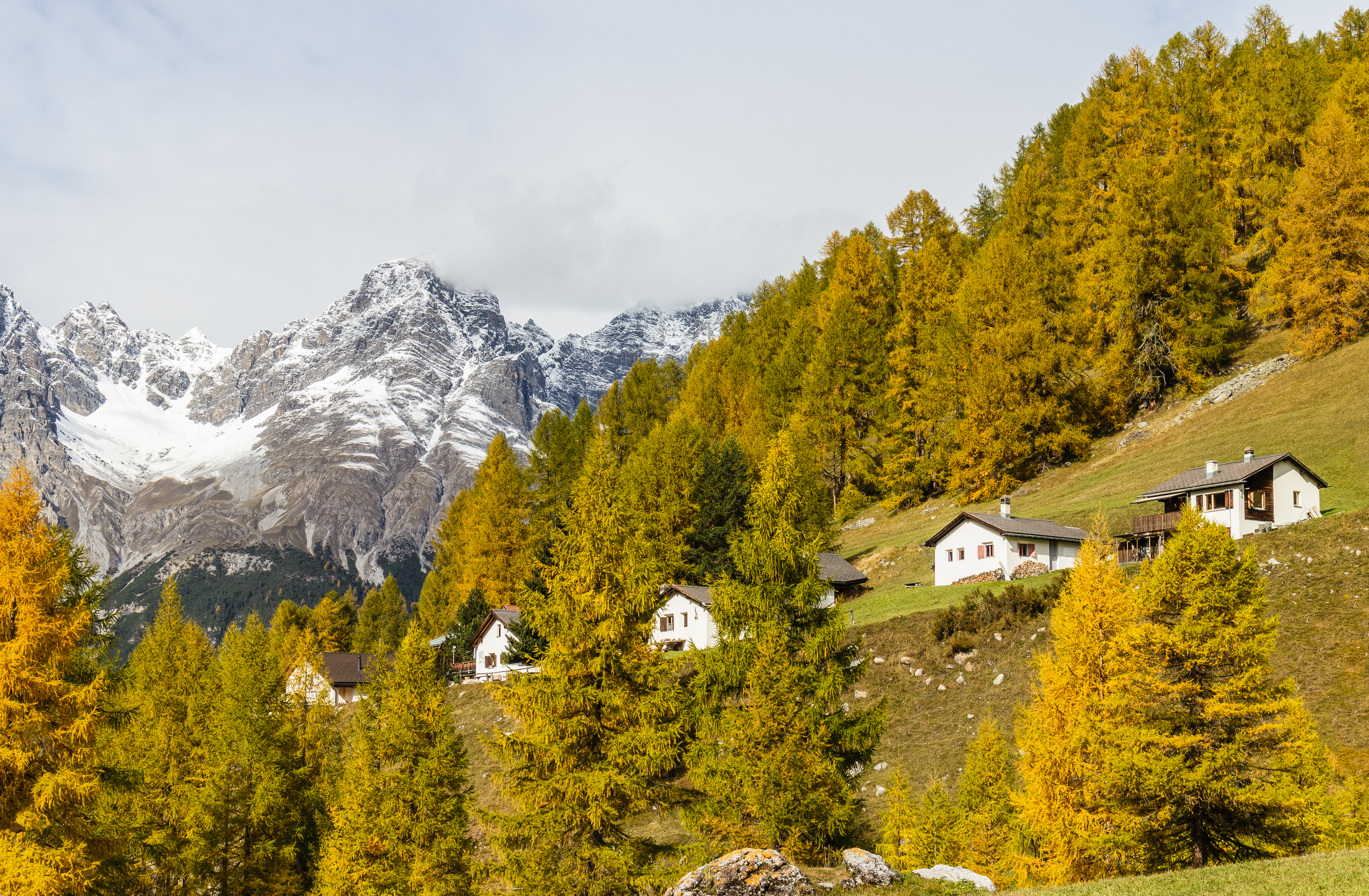
Häuser oberhalb von S-charl.

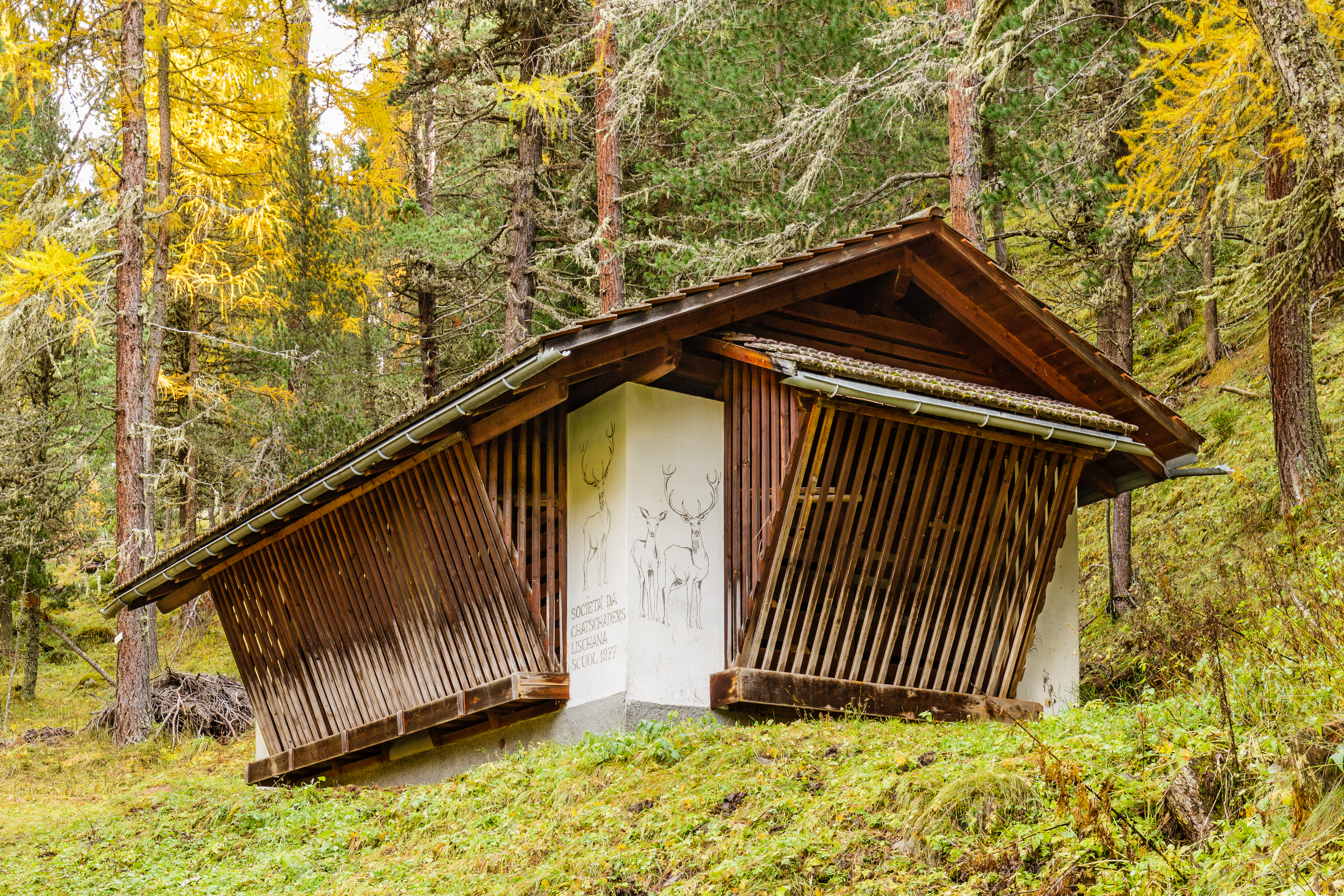
Wildfutterplatz.

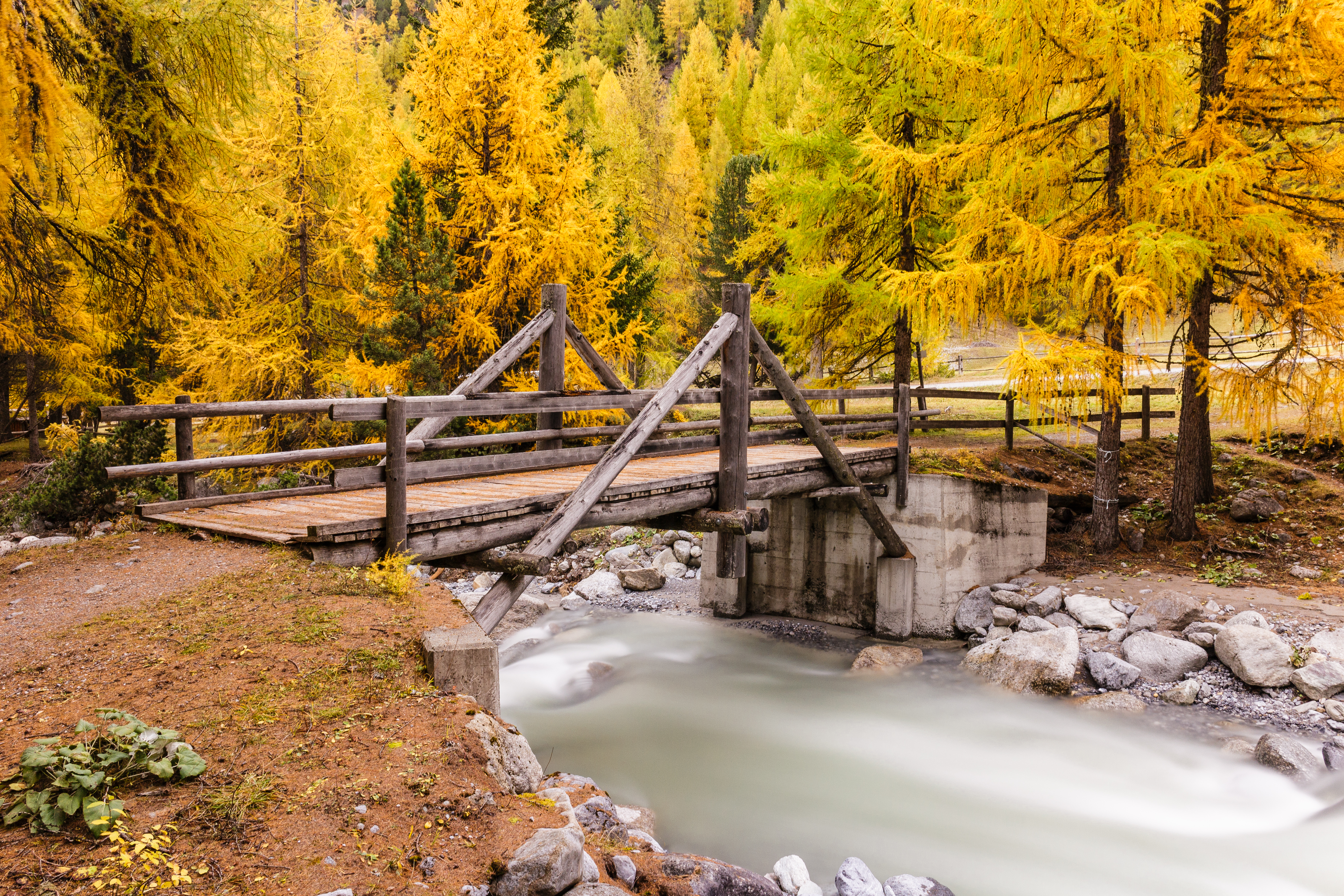
Brücke über die Clemgia.

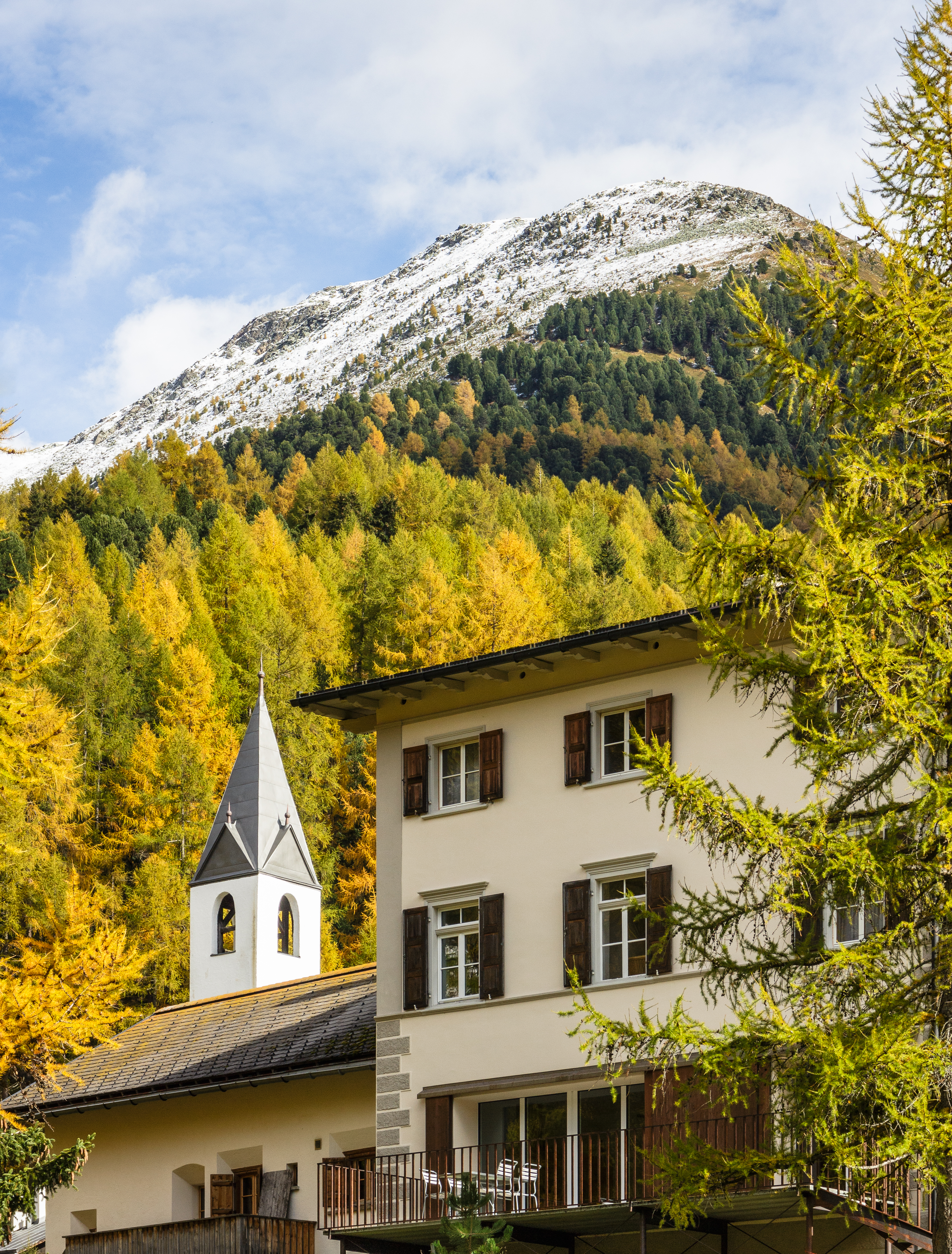
Zentrum

Gebirgsbach Aval S-charl, Nebenfluss der Clemgia.

S-charl, Stromschnellen im Gebirgsbach Clemgia, einem Nebenfluss des Inns.
