= Sesvenna Alps =

Mountain in Italy

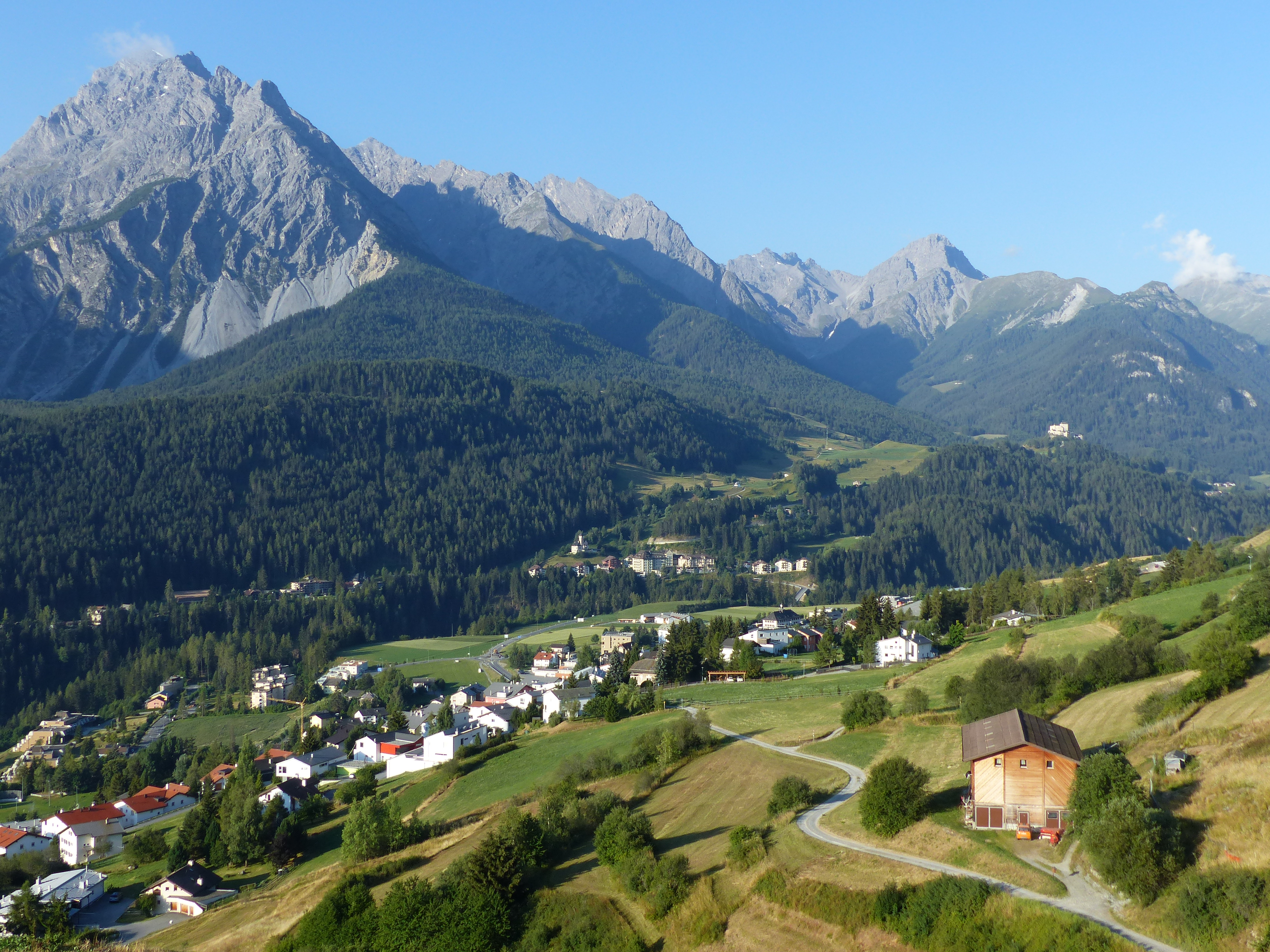
- Engadine Dolomites (Piz Pisoc massif) from Scuol

Highest point
- Peak: Piz Sesvenna
- Elevation: 3,204 m (10,512 ft)
- Coordinates: 46°42′21″N 10°24′10″E

Geography
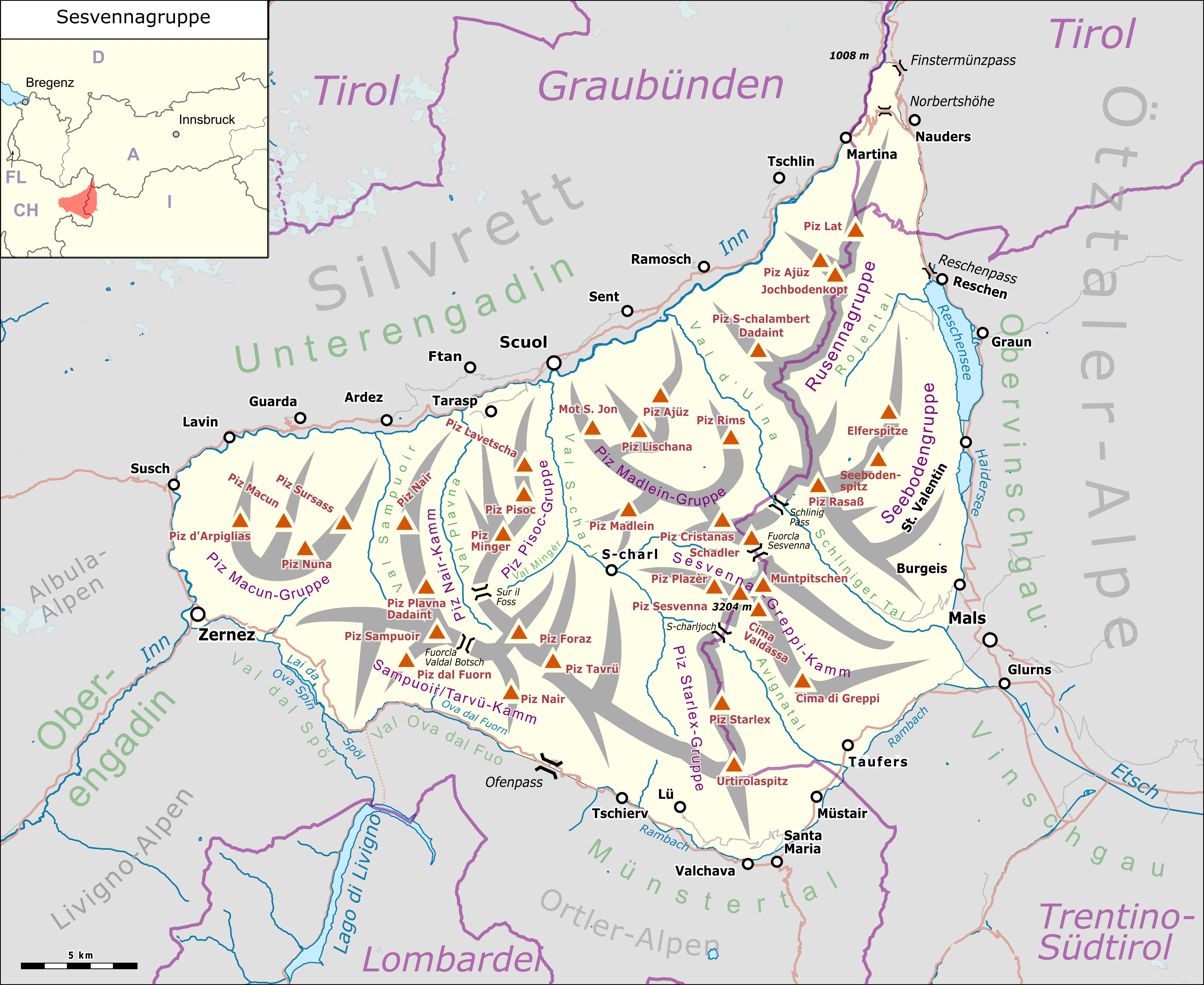
- Sesvenna Alps; The borders of the range according to Alpine Club classification of the Eastern Alps
- Countries: Switzerland; Italy; Austria
- States: Graubünden; South Tyrol; Tyrol (state)
- Parent range: Central Eastern Alps

The Sesvenna Alps are a mountain range located in the Alps of eastern Switzerland, northern Italy and western Austria.

== Geography ==
Sesvenna Alps are considered to be part of the Central Eastern Alps. Their high dolomitic peaks overlook Scuol in the lower Engadine Valley, warranting them the name Engadine Dolomites.

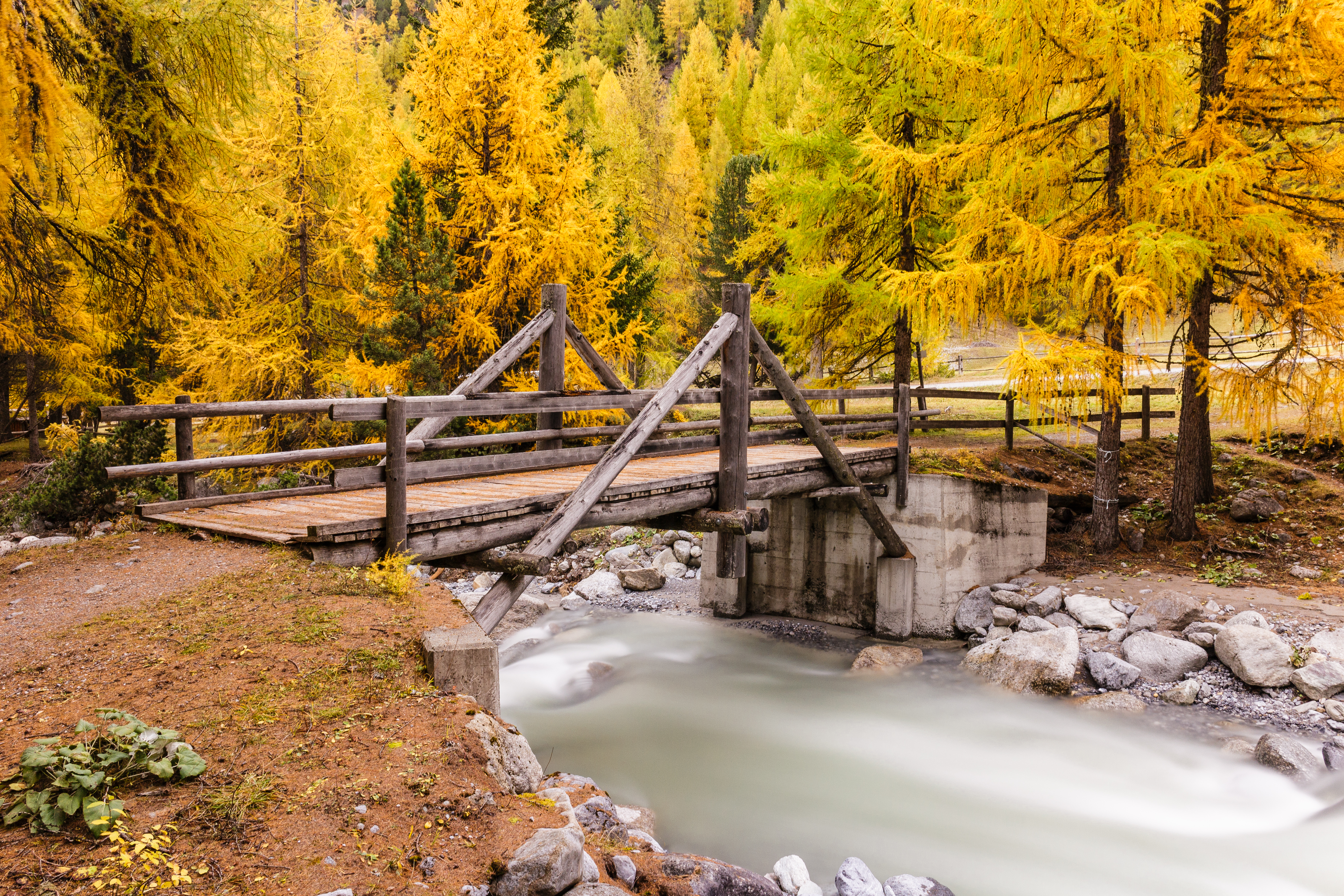
S-charl, Clemgia

The Sesvenna Alps are separated from the Samnaun, Silvretta and Albula Alps in the north-west by the Engadine Valley; from the Livigno Alps in the south-west by the Spöl valley; from the Ortler Alps in the south-south-west by the Ofen Pass and Val Müstair; from the Ötztal Alps in the east by the upper Adige valley and the Reschen Pass. The range is drained by the rivers Inn (the Engadine) and Adige.

The highest peak is Piz Sesvenna, closely followed by the high peaks overlooking Scuol: Piz Pisoc, Piz Plavna Dadaint and Piz Lischana.

== Peaks ==
The main peaks of the Sesvenna Alps are:

| Peak | Elevation | |
| Peak | m | ft |
|---|---|---|
| Piz Sesvenna | 3204 | 10,512 |
| Piz Pisoc | 3178 | 10,427 |
| Piz Plavna Dadaint | 3168 | 10,394 |
| Piz Plavna Dadaint | 3166 | 10,387 |
| Piz Nuna | 3124 | 10,249 |
| Piz Minger | 3114 | 10,217 |
| Piz Lischana | 3110 | 10,204 |
| Piz Madlain | 3099 | 10,167 |
| Piz Cristanas | 3092 | 10,144 |
| Piz Laschadurella | 3046 | 9,993 |
| Piz d'Arpiglias | 3027 | 9,931 |
| Piz Sampuoir | 3023 | 9,918 |
| Piz Terza | 2909 | 9,544 |
| Piz dal Fuorn | 2906 | 2534 |
| Piz Macun | 2889 | 9,478 |
| Piz Lad | 2808 | 9,213 |
| Piz Ajüz | 2788 | 9,147 |

== Passes ==
The main passes of the Sesvenna Alps are:

| Mountain pass | location 1 | type | Elevation | |
| Mountain pass | location 1 | type | m | ft |
|---|---|---|---|---|
| Fuorcla Sesvenna | S-charl to Mals | footpath | 2824 | 9265 |
| Schlining Pass | Sent to Mals | bridle path | 2301 | 7549 |
| S-charl Pass | S-charl to Taufers | bridle path | 2296 | 7532 |
| Ofen Pass | Zernez to Val Müstair | road | 2155 | 7070 |

== Gallery ==
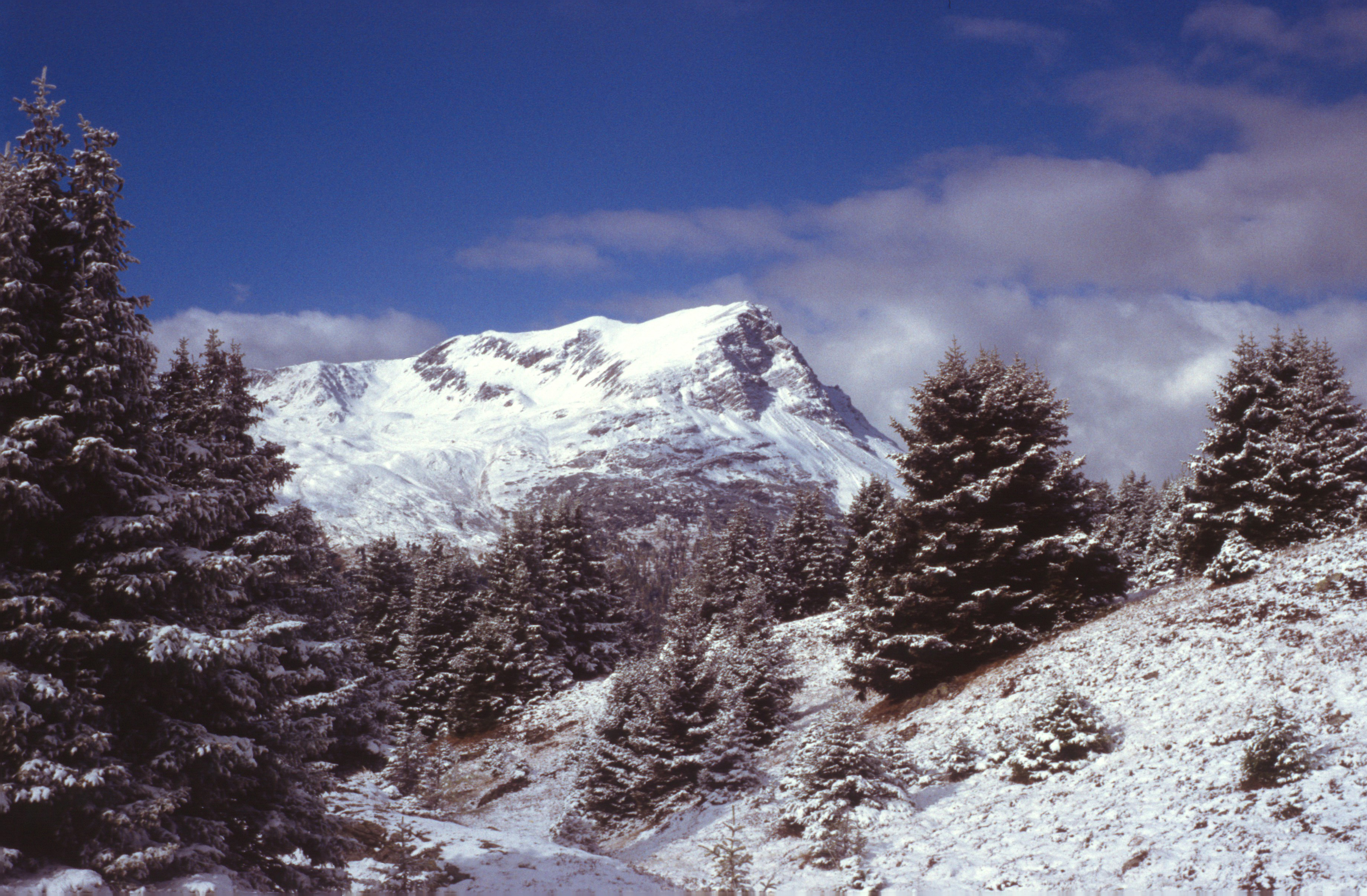
Piz Lad

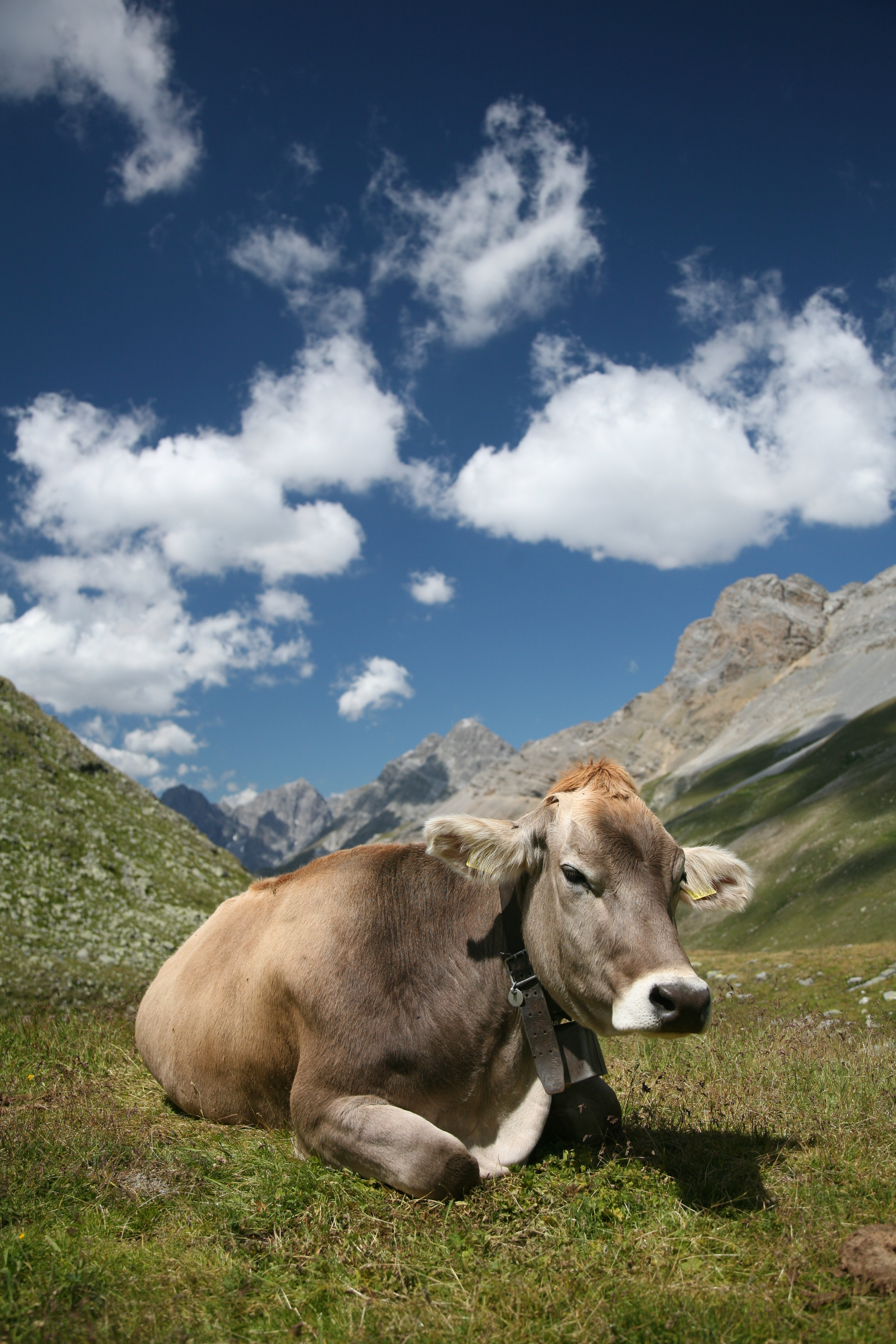
Pasture below Fuorcla Sesvenna

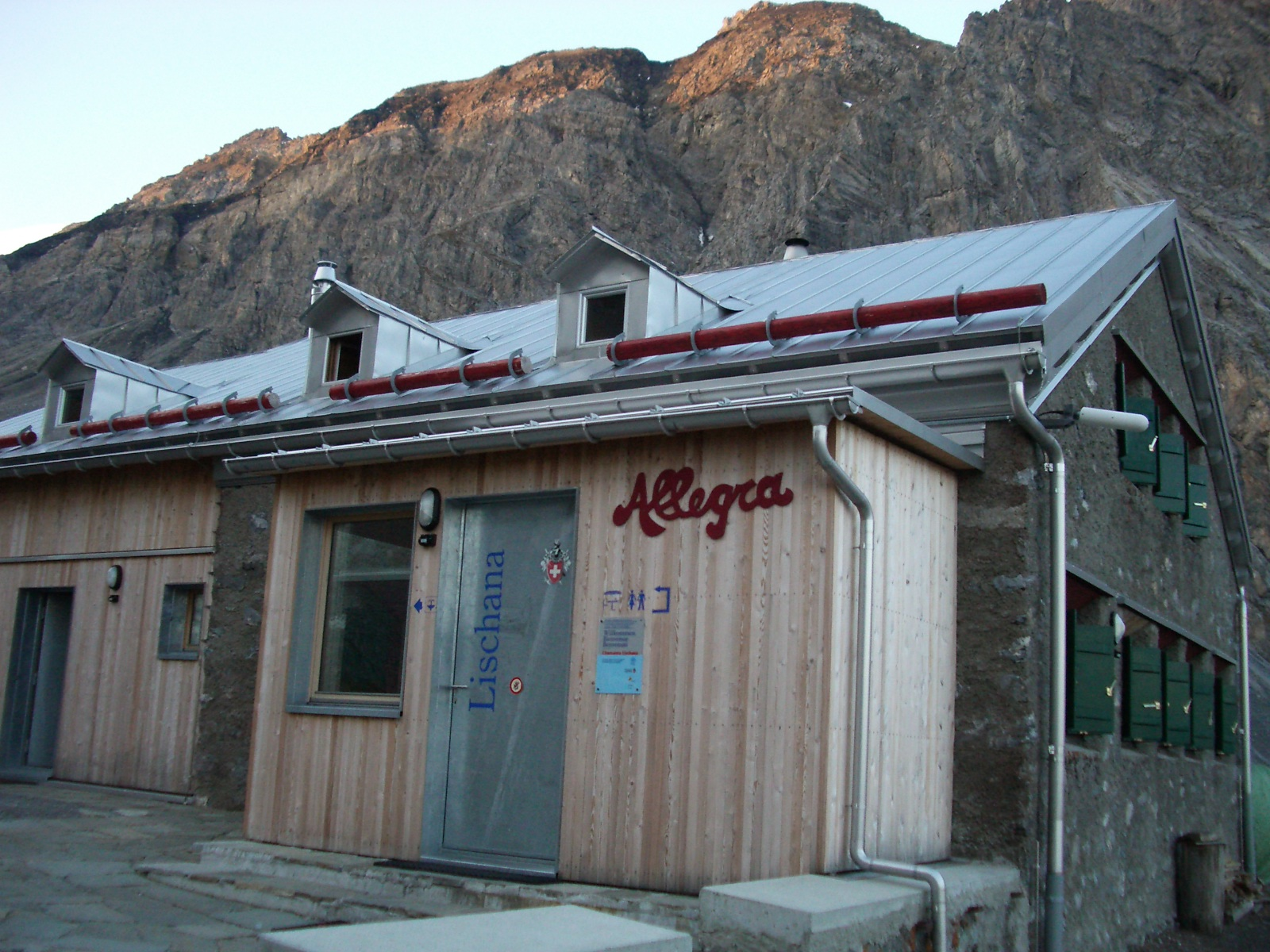
Lischanahütte near Piz Lischana

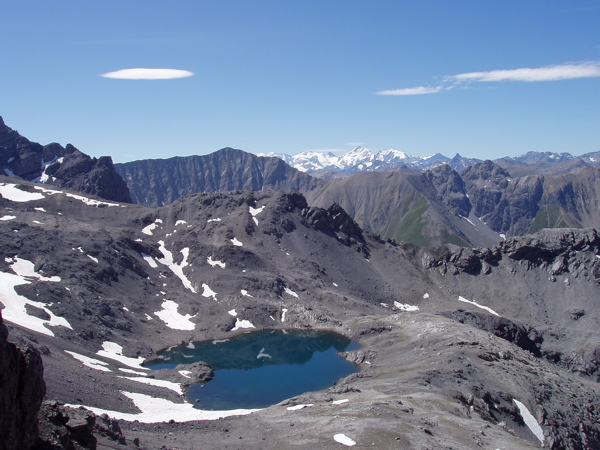
Swiss National Park

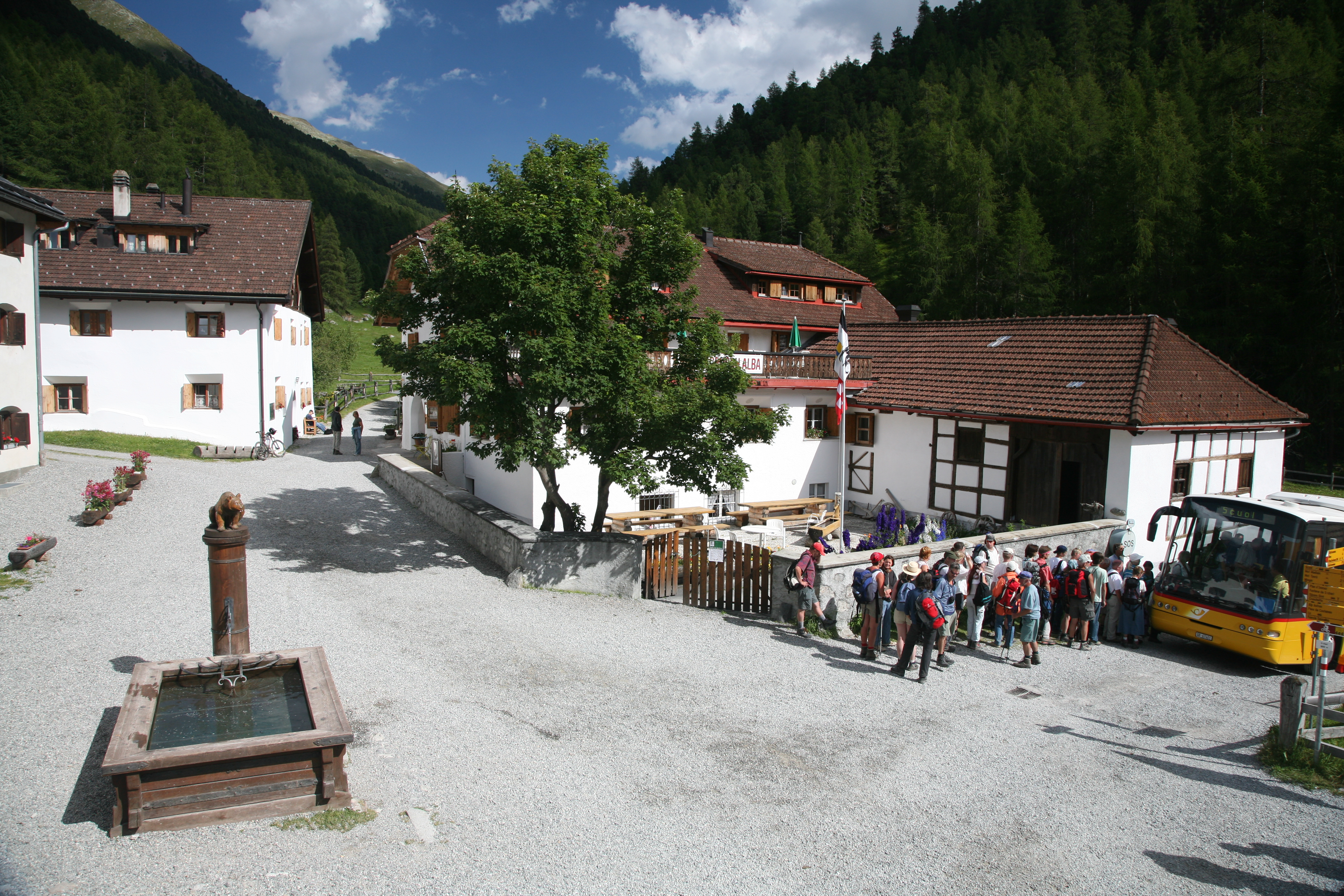
The village of S-charl

== See also ==
- Swiss Alps
