= List of mountains of Uri =

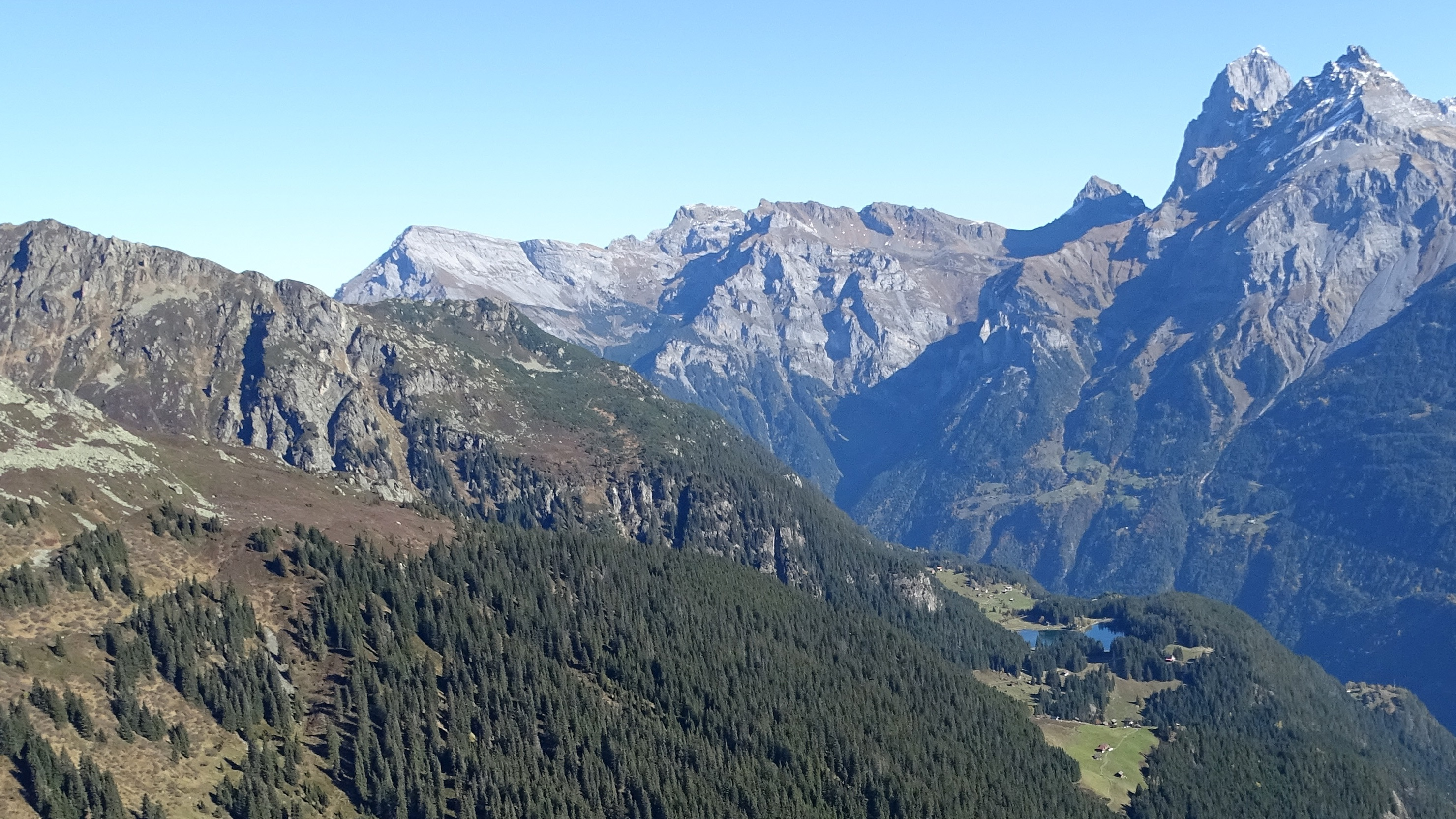
From left to right: Langchälengrätli, Sunnig Grat, Bälmeter Grätli, Hoch Fulen, and Gross Windgällen.

This is a list of mountains of the Swiss canton of Uri. Uri is a very mountainous canton and lies entirely within the Alps. It is also one of the five cantons having summits above 3,600 metres. Topographically, the most important summit of the canton is that of the Dammastock (most elevated, most prominent and most isolated).

This list only includes significant summits with a topographic prominence of at least 150 metres (492 ft). There are over 90 such summits in Uri and they are found in almost all its municipalities. All mountain heights and prominences on the list are from the largest-scale maps available.

== List ==
Mountain	Height (m)	Drop (m)	Coordinates	Range	Municipality(ies)	First ascent
Dammastock	3630	1466	46°38′36″N 08°25′16″E	Uri Alps	Göschenen	1864
Galenstock	3586	252	46°36′43″N 08°25′01″E	Uri Alps	Realp	1845
Sustenhorn	3503	414	46°41′56″N 08°27′19″E	Uri Alps	Göschenen	1841
Hinter Tierberg	3477	187	46°41′03″N 08°23′51″E	Uri Alps	Göschenen	
Gwächtenhorn	3420	218	46°41′27″N 08°24′48″E	Uri Alps	Göschenen	
Fleckistock/Rot Stock	3416	760	46°42′27″N 08°29′51″E	Uri Alps	Göschenen/Wassen	1864
Oberalpstock/Piz Tgietschen	3328	703	46°44′34″N 08°46′10″E	Glarus Alps	Silenen	1793
Gross Schärhorn	3294	513	46°49′38″N 08°49′45″E	Glarus Alps	Silenen/Unterschächen	1842
Clariden	3267	413	46°50′31″N 08°52′17″E	Glarus Alps	Silenen/Spiringen	1863
Gross Düssi/Piz Git	3256	429	46°47′30″N 08°49′39″E	Glarus Alps	Silenen	1841
Rorspitzli	3220	255	46°41′26″N 08°31′22″E	Uri Alps	Göschenen/Wassen	
Chammliberg	3220	194	46°50′12″N 08°50′42″E	Glarus Alps	Silenen/Unterschächen	
Gross Spannort	3198	616	46°47′12″N 08°31′28″E	Uri Alps	Attinghausen/Erstfeld	1867
Gross Windgällen	3187	552	46°48′26″N 08°43′56″E	Glarus Alps	Silenen	1848
Hoch Horefellistock	3175	154	46°40′10″N 08°28′30″E	Uri Alps	Göschenen	
Gross Ruchen	3138	397	46°48′37″N 08°46′29″E	Glarus Alps	Silenen/Unterschächen	1864
Schlossberg	3133	506	46°48′09″N 08°31′37″E	Uri Alps	Attinghausen/Erstfeld	1863
Krönten	3108	330	46°46′56″N 08°34′10″E	Uri Alps	Erstfeld/Gurtnellen	1868
Gross Muttenhorn	3099	292	46°32′48″N 08°25′38″E	Lepontine Alps	Realp	
Piz Giuv/Schattig Wichel	3096	749	46°42′07″N 08°41′33″E	Glarus Alps	Gurtnellen/Silenen	1804
Bristen	3073	567	46°44′13″N 08°40′52″E	Glarus Alps	Gurtnellen/Silenen	1823
Wendenhorn	3023	311	46°45′14″N 08°26′37″E	Uri Alps	Wassen	1884
Witenalpstock	3016	266	46°44′10″N 08°44′51″E	Glarus Alps	Silenen	
Pizzo Centrale	2999	451	46°34′41″N 08°36′54″E	Lepontine Alps	Andermatt/Hospental	
Pizzo Lucendro	2963	350	46°32′20″N 08°31′10″E	Lepontine Alps	Realp	1871
Rienzenstock	2962	479	46°40′59″N 08°38′06″E	Glarus Alps	Göschenen/Gurtnellen/Wassen	
Brunnistock	2952	661	46°50′52″N 08°33′00″E	Uri Alps	Attinghausen	
Badus/Six Madun	2928	529	46°37′21″N 08°39′49″E	Lepontine Alps	Andermatt	1785
Wissigstock	2887	329	46°50′44″N 08°30′24″E	Uri Alps	Attinghausen/Isenthal	
Schächentaler Windgällen	2764	691	46°53′17″N 08°47′30″E	Schwyz Alps	Unterschächen	
Schwarzberg/Piz Nair	2764	343	46°36′34″N 08°40′40″E	Lepontine Alps	Andermatt	
Chaiserstock	2515	470	46°55′42″N 08°43′43″E	Schwyz Alps	Bürglen	
Fulen	2491	311	46°55′07″N 08°42′53″E	Schwyz Alps	Bürglen	
Hoh Brisen	2413	489	46°53′51″N 08°27′57″E	Uri Alps	Isenthal	
Niderbauen-Chulm	1923	327	46°56′51″N 08°33′24″E	Uri Alps	Seelisberg	

== See also ==
- List of mountains of Switzerland
- Swiss Alps
