= Lochberg =

Mountain in Switzerland

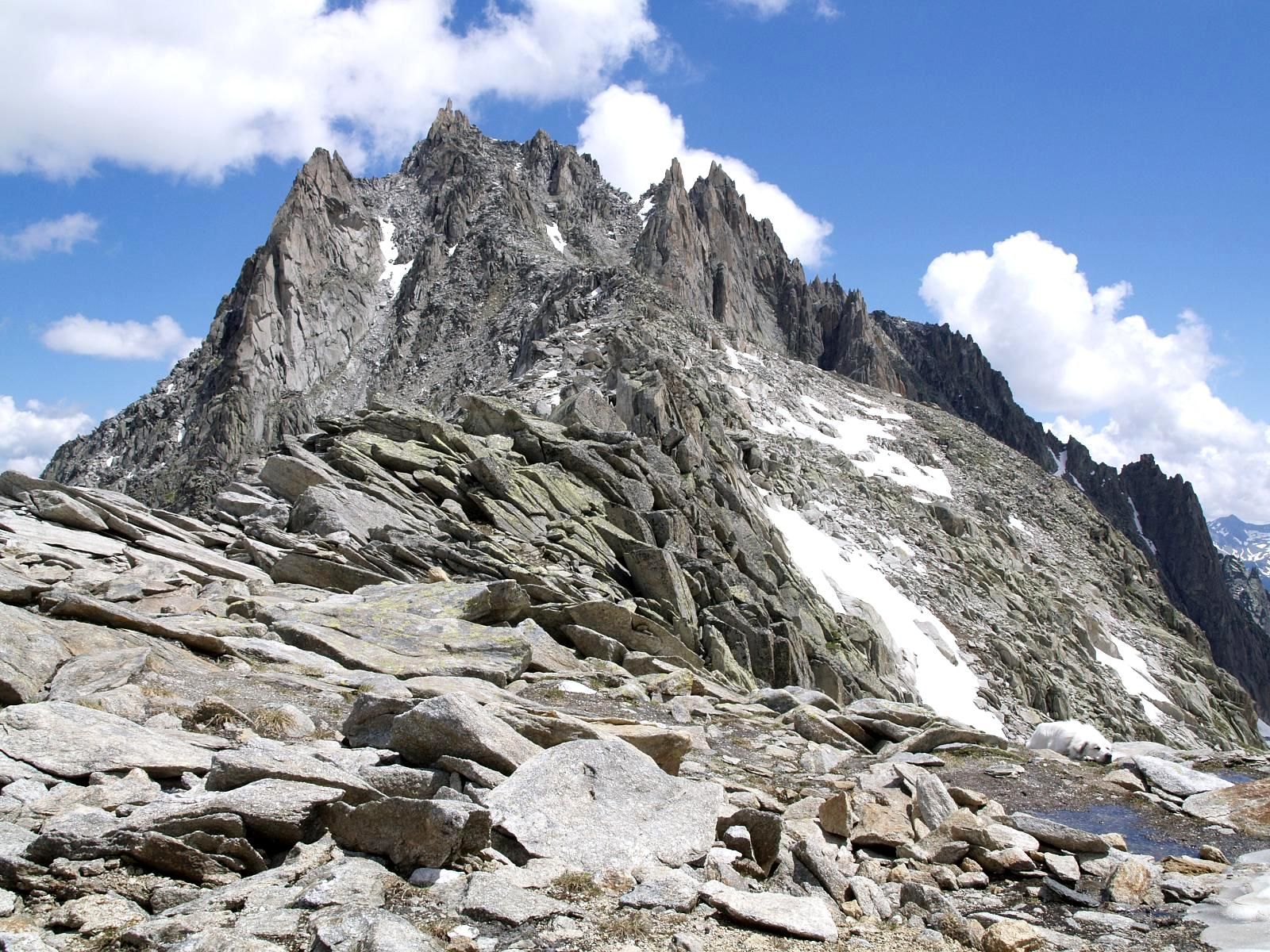
- View from the Winterlücke (west side)

Highest point
- Elevation: 3,079 m (10,102 ft)
- Prominence: 225 m (738 ft)
- Parent peak: Dammastock
- Coordinates: 46°37′30″N 8°29′53″E

Geography
- Location within Switzerland
- Location: Uri, Switzerland
- Parent range: Urner Alps

The Lochberg is a mountain of the Urner Alps, overlooking the Göscheneralpsee in the canton of Uri. It lies on the chain that separates the Göschenertal from the valley called Urseren, east of the Winterstock.

The closest locality is Realp on the southern side.
