= Steinhüshorn =

Mountain in Switzerland

- Steinhaushorn
- Location within Switzerland

Highest point
- Elevation: 3,121 m (10,240 ft)
- Prominence: 182 m (597 ft)
- Parent peak: Dammastock
- Coordinates: 46°40′04″N 08°19′56.1″E

Geography
- Location: Bern, Switzerland
- Parent range: Urner Alps

The Steinhüshorn (or Steinhaushorn) is a mountain of the Urner Alps, overlooking Guttannen in the Bernese Oberland. It lies north of the Diechterhorn and west of the Trift Glacier.
