= Müeterlishorn =

Mountain in Switzerland

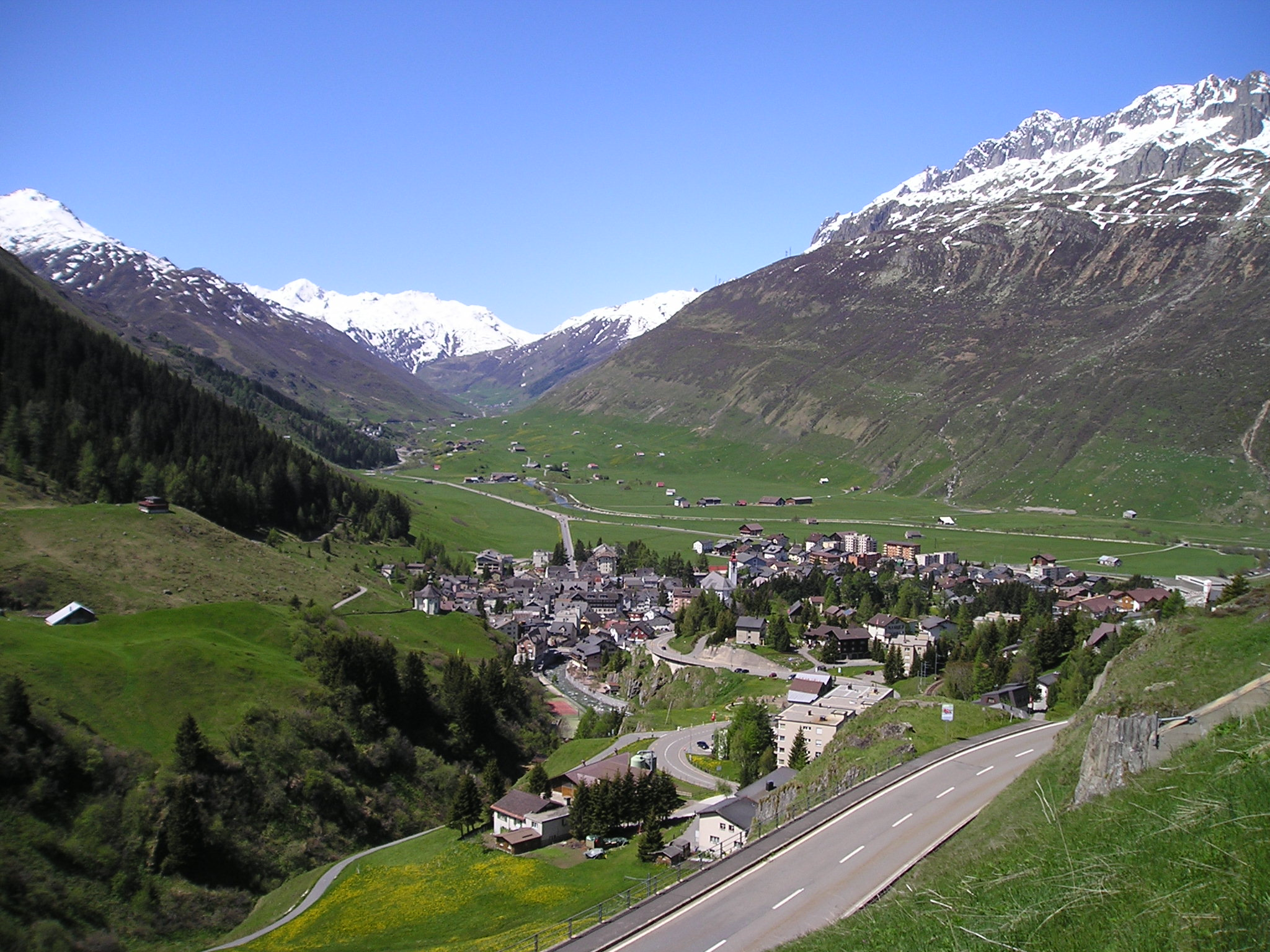
- The Müeterlishorn (right) from Andermatt

Highest point
- Elevation: 3,066 m (10,059 ft)
- Prominence: 285 m (935 ft)
- Parent peak: Dammastock
- Coordinates: 46°37′30″N 8°29′53″E

Geography
- Location within Switzerland
- Location: Uri, Switzerland
- Parent range: Urner Alps

The Müeterlishorn is a mountain of the Urner Alps, overlooking the Göscheneralpsee in the canton of Uri. It lies on the chain that separates the Göschenertal from the valley called Urseren.

The closest locality is Realp on the southern side.
