= Mittagstock =

Mountain in Switzerland

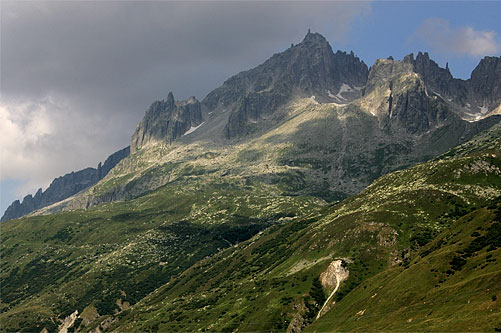
- View from Hospental (south side)

Highest point
- Elevation: 2,989 m (9,806 ft)
- Prominence: 160 m (520 ft)
- Parent peak: Müeterlishorn
- Coordinates: 46°37′56.6″N 8°30′43.5″E

Geography
- Location within Switzerland
- Location: Uri, Switzerland
- Parent range: Urner Alps

The Mittagstock is a mountain of the Urner Alps, overlooking the Göscheneralpsee in the canton of Uri. It lies on the chain that separates the Göschenertal from the valley called Urseren.
