= Radlefshorn =

Mountain in Switzerland

- Location within Switzerland

Highest point
- Elevation: 2,603 m (8,540 ft)
- Prominence: 102 m (335 ft)
- Parent peak: Dammastock
- Coordinates: 46°42′51.8″N 8°21′19″E

Geography
- Location: Bern, Switzerland
- Parent range: Urner Alps

The Radlefshorn is a mountain of the Urner Alps, overlooking Gadmen in the canton of Bern. On its southern side it overlooks the Trift Glacier and the lake of Trift.
