= Tiefenstock =

Mountain in Switzerland

- Location within Switzerland

Highest point
- Elevation: 3,515 m (11,532 ft)
- Prominence: 90 m (300 ft)
- Parent peak: Dammastock
- Coordinates: 46°37′37.6″N 8°25′19.6″E

Geography
- Location: Valais/Uri, Switzerland
- Parent range: Urner Alps

The Tiefenstock (3,515 m) is a mountain of the Urner Alps, located on the border between the Swiss cantons of Valais and Uri. Its summit is the tripoint between the valleys of the Rhone Glacier (in Valais), the Damma Glacier and the Tiefen Glacier (both in Uri).
