= Hinter Tierberg =

Mountain in Switzerland

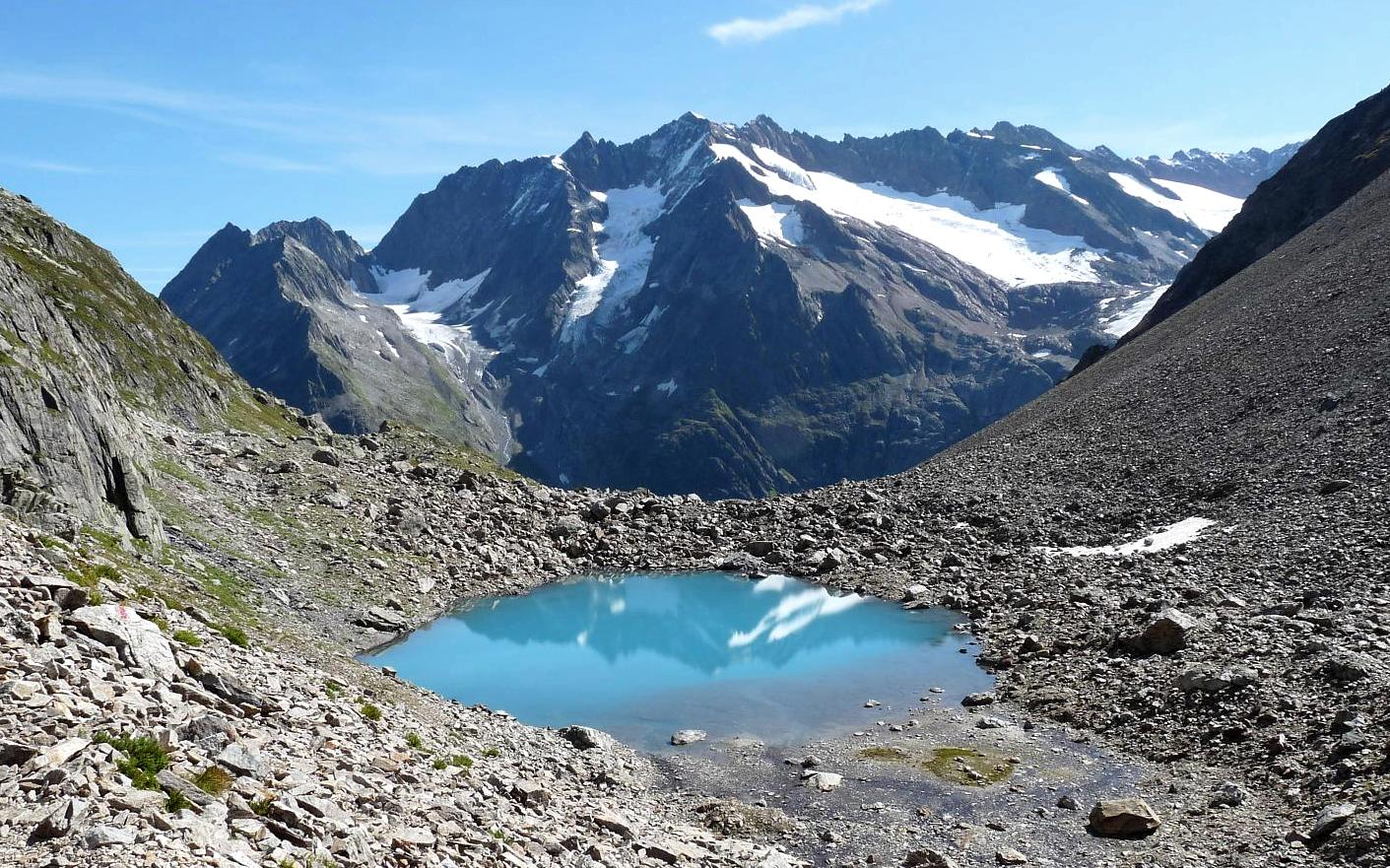
- View from the west side

Highest point
- Elevation: 3,445 m (11,302 ft)
- Prominence: 185 m (607 ft)
- Parent peak: Dammastock
- Coordinates: 46°41′2.5″N 8°23′50.7″E

Geography
- Location within Switzerland
- Location: Bern/Uri
- Country: Switzerland
- Parent range: Uri Alps
- Topo map: Swiss Federal Office of Topography swisstopo

The Hinter Tierberg is a 3,445 metres high mountain in the Uri Alps, located on the border between the cantons of Bern and Uri. It overlooks the Trift Glacier on its west side and the Chelen Glacier on its east side.

The massif of the Tierberg consists of several mountains, they are (from north to south): Vorder Tierberg (3,091 metres), Mittler Tierberg (3,418 metres) and Hinter Tierberg.

The Hinter Tierberg is connected to the south to the higher Dammastock by a ridge whose lowest point is approximately 3,260 metres.

In August 2016, a Swiss Air Force F/A-18 fighter crashed close to the mountain.
