= Winterstock =

Mountain in Switzerland

- Location within Switzerland

Highest point
- Elevation: 3,203 m (10,509 ft)
- Prominence: 120 m (390 ft)
- Parent peak: Dammastock
- Coordinates: 46°37′13″N 8°27′15.6″E

Geography
- Location: Uri, Switzerland
- Parent range: Urner Alps

The Winterstock is a mountain of the Urner Alps, located west of Realp in the canton of Uri. It lies on the range east of the Tiefenstock, that separates the Göschenertal from the valley called Urseren.
