= Klein Furkahorn =

Mountain in Switzerland

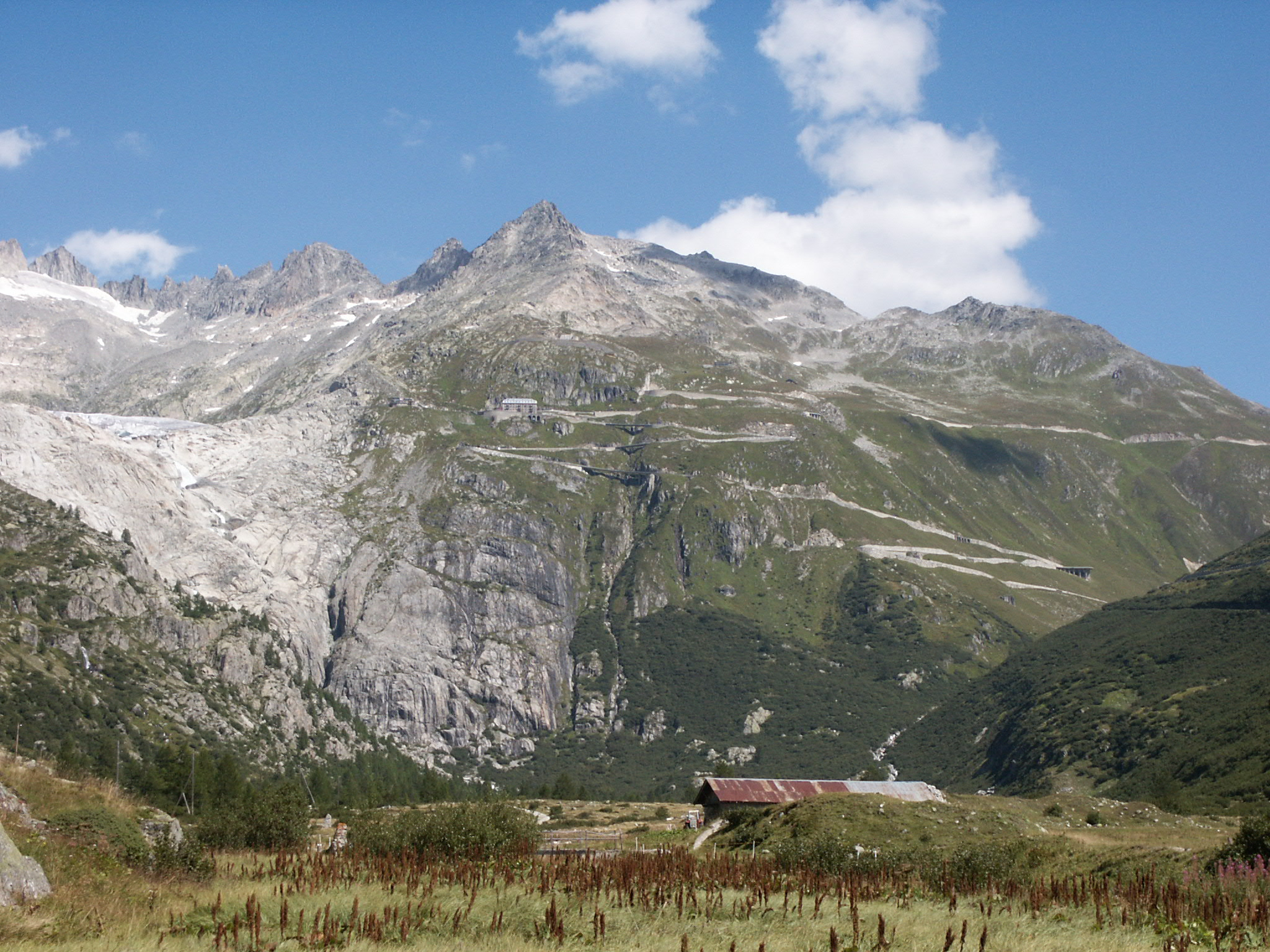

Highest point
- Elevation: 3,026 m (9,928 ft)
- Prominence: 46 m (151 ft)
- Parent peak: Unnamed summit (3,043 m)
- Coordinates: 46°35′08.6″N 08°24′22.7″E

Geography
- Location within Switzerland
- Location: Valais/Uri, Switzerland
- Parent range: Urner Alps

The Klein Furkahorn (3,026 m) is a mountain of the Urner Alps, overlooking the Furka Pass on the border between the Swiss cantons of Valais and Uri. It lies near the southern end of the Galenstock-Gross Furkahorn chain, east of the Rhone Glacier.

From the Furka Pass a trail leads to its summit.
