= Tieralplistock =

Mountain in Switzerland

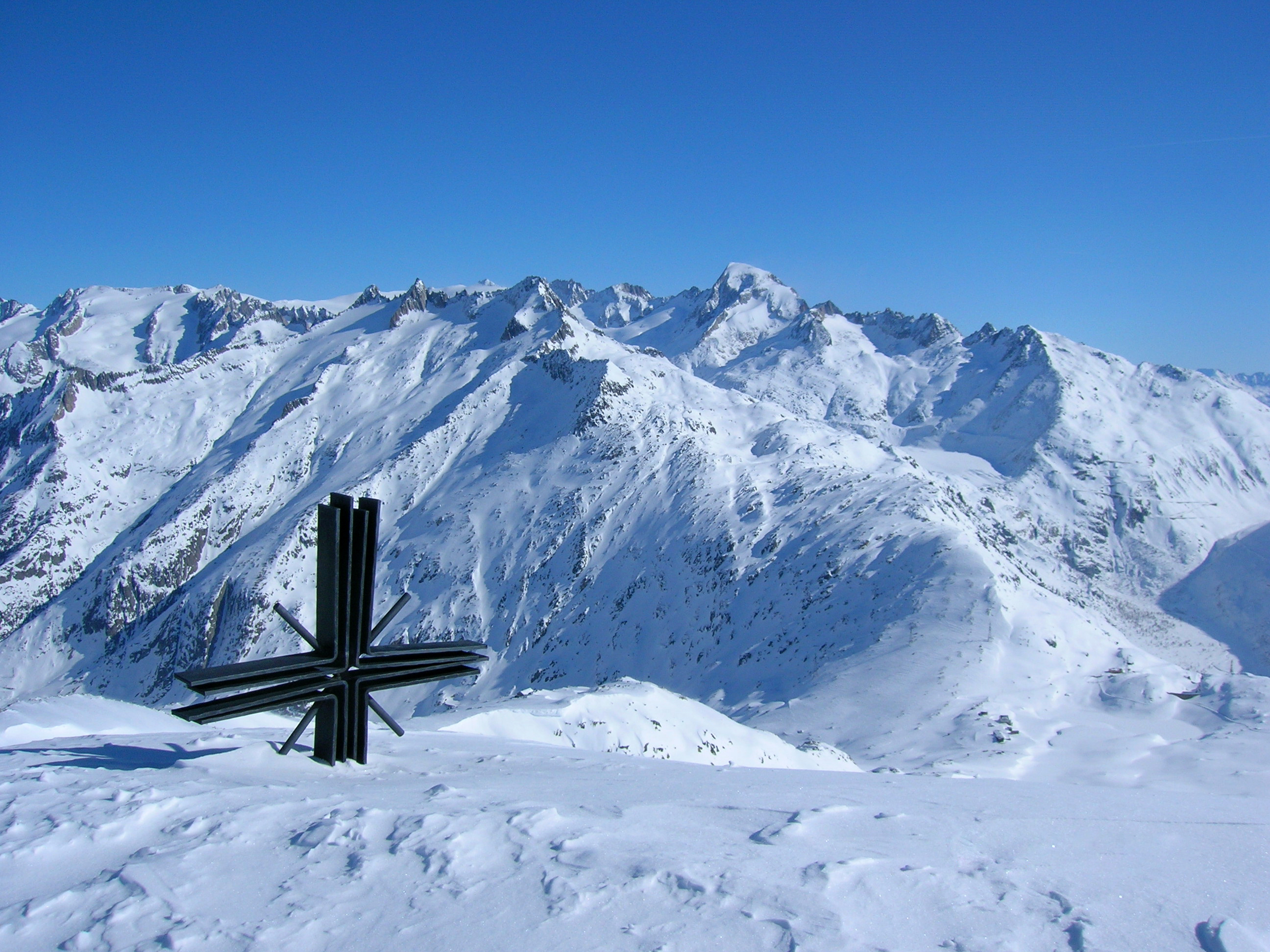
- View of the Tieralplistock, first peak on the left of the photo.

Highest point
- Elevation: 3,383 m (11,099 ft)
- Prominence: 23 m (75 ft)
- Parent peak: Unnamed summit (3,388 m)
- Coordinates: 46°37′58.9″N 8°22′31.1″E

Geography
- Location within Switzerland
- Location: Bern/Valais, Switzerland
- Parent range: Urner Alps

The Tieralplistock (3,383 m) is a mountain of the Urner Alps, located on the border between the Swiss cantons of Bern and Valais. It lies between the Trift Glacier and the Rhone Glacier, just east of the lake of Gelmer.

Between the Diechterhorn and the Tieralplistock is a slightly higher unnamed summit (3,388 m).
