= Schneestock =

Mountain in Switzerland

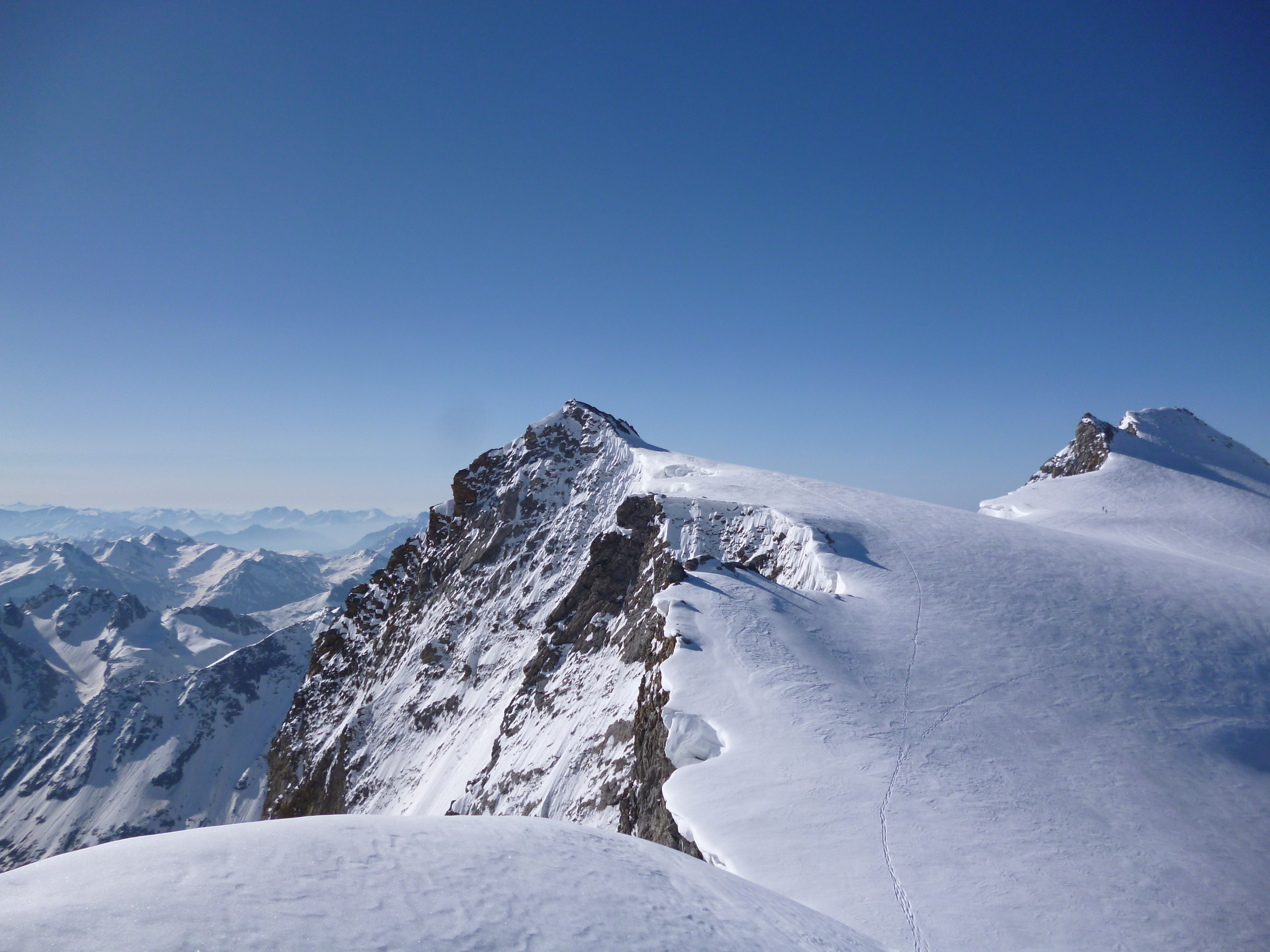
- Schneestock from north west, on the right Dammastock

Highest point
- Elevation: 3,608 m (11,837 ft)
- Prominence: 38 m (125 ft)
- Parent peak: Dammastock
- Coordinates: 46°38′52.2″N 8°25′18.7″E

Geography
- Location within Switzerland
- Location: Valais/Uri, Switzerland
- Parent range: Urner Alps

The Schneestock is a mountain of the Urner Alps, located on the border between the Swiss cantons of Valais and Uri. It lies north of the Dammastock, between the Rhone Glacier and the Damma Glacier.
