= Rhonestock =

Mountain in Switzerland

- Location within Switzerland

Highest point
- Peak: Hinterer Rhonestock
- Elevation: 3,588 m (11,772 ft)
- Prominence: 87 m (285 ft)
- Parent peak: Dammastock (line parent)
- Coordinates: 46°38′4″N 8°25′9.5″E

Geography
- Location: Valais/Uri
- Country: Switzerland
- Parent range: Uri Alps
- Topo map: Swiss Federal Office of Topography swisstopo

The Rhonestock is a ridge section of Dammastock in the Uri Alps located on the border between the Swiss cantons of Valais and Uri and belongs to the Winterberg massif. It lies south of the Dammastock, between the Rhone Glacier and the Damma Glacier.

It is composed of two subpeaks of Dammastock: the Hinterer Rhonestock (3,588 m) and the Vorderer Rhonestock (3,566 m).
