= Gross Furkahorn =

Mountain in Switzerland

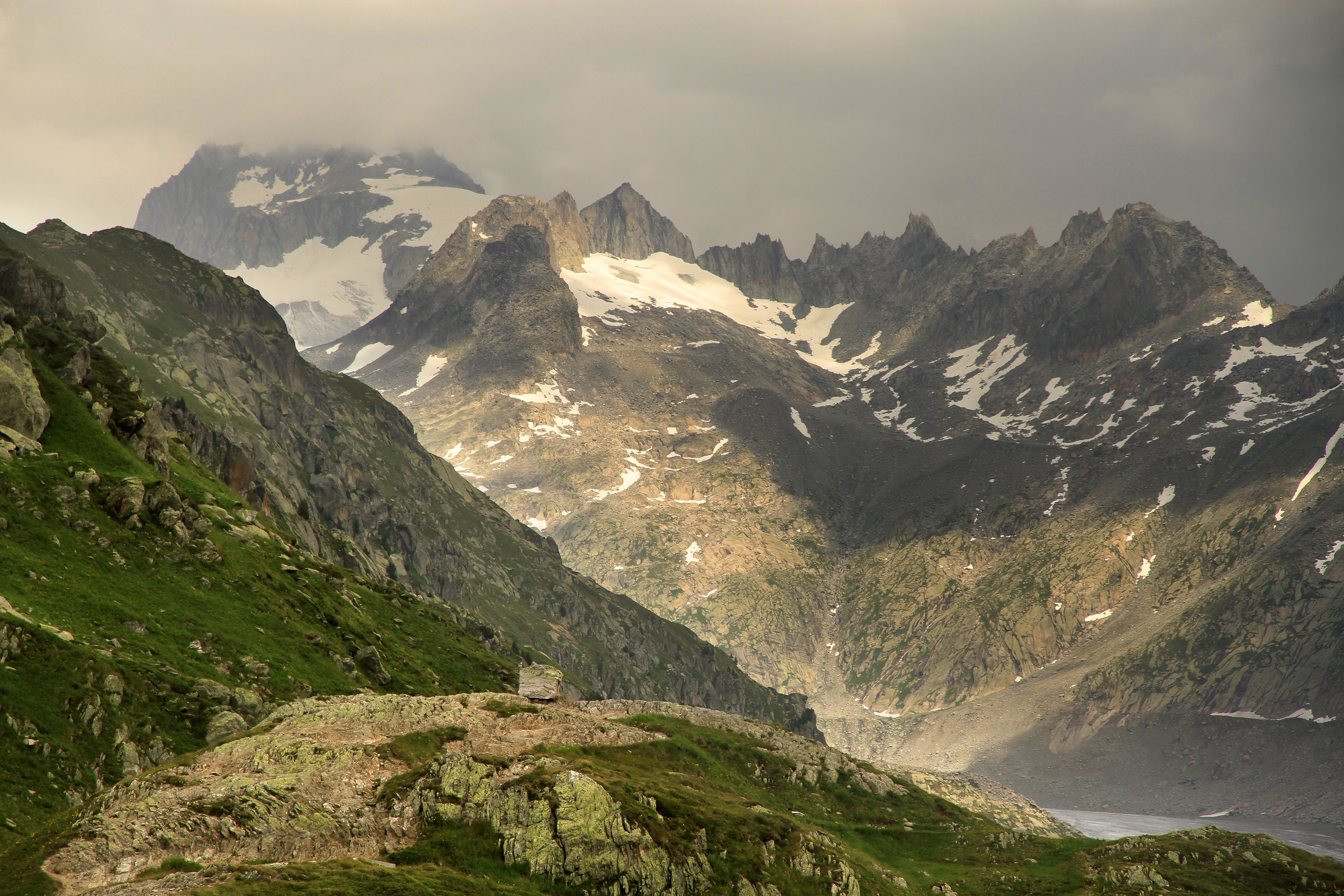
- The Galenstock (left), the Sidelenhorn (centre) and the Gross Furkahorn (centre right) from the Grimsel Pass (west side)

Highest point
- Elevation: 3,169 m (10,397 ft)
- Prominence: 60 m (200 ft)
- Parent peak: Dammastock
- Coordinates: 46°35′47.7″N 8°24′36.9″E

Geography
- Location within Switzerland
- Location: Valais/Uri, Switzerland
- Parent range: Urner Alps

The Gross Furkahorn is a mountain of the Urner Alps, located on the border between the Swiss cantons of Valais and Uri. It lies north of the Furka Pass and east of the Rhone Glacier.
