= Gärstenhörner =

Mountain in Switzerland

- Mittler Gärstenhorn
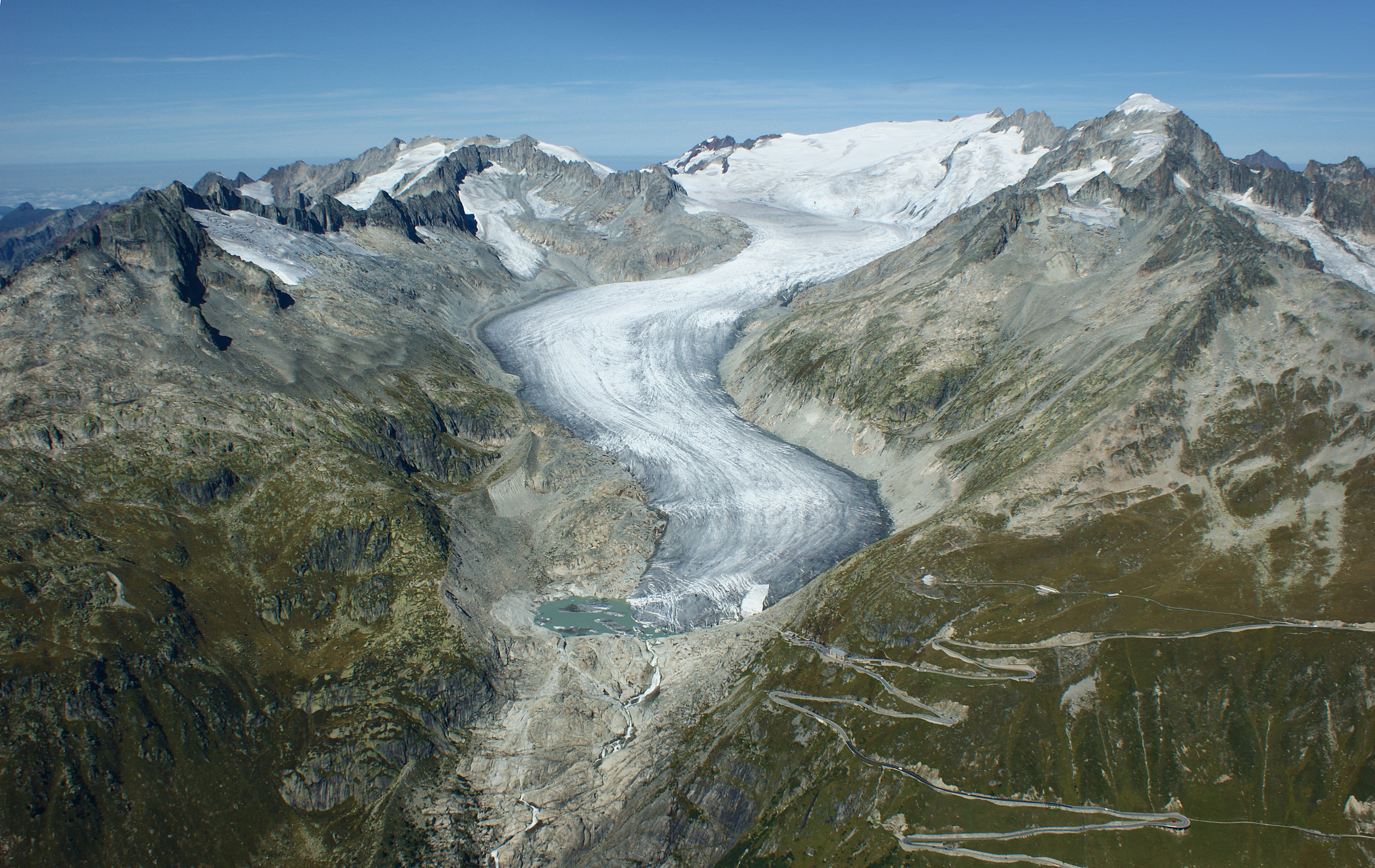
- Aerial view of the Rhone Glacier with the Gärstenhörner on the left

Highest point
- Elevation: 3,189 m (10,463 ft)
- Prominence: 200 m (660 ft)
- Parent peak: Dammastock
- Coordinates: 46°35′54″N 8°21′42″E

Geography
- Location within Switzerland
- Location: Bern/Valais, Switzerland
- Parent range: Urner Alps

The Gärstenhörner is a mountain in the Urner Alps, located on the border between the Swiss cantons of Bern and Valais. It lies on the range west of the Rhone Glacier, and east of the Grimsel Pass. The Gärstenhörner has three summits: the Mittler Gärstenhorn (3,189 m), the Hinter Gärstenhorn (3,173 m) and the Vorder Gärstenhorn (3,167 m).
