= Wandelen =

Mountain in Switzerland

- Location within Switzerland

Highest point
- Elevation: 2,105 m (6,906 ft)
- Prominence: 139 m (456 ft)
- Parent peak: Heitlistock
- Coordinates: 46°49′22″N 8°14′52″E

Geography
- Location: Obwalden, Switzerland
- Parent range: Urner Alps

The Wandelen is a mountain of the Urner Alps, overlooking Lake Sarnen in the canton of Obwalden. It lies at the northern end of the chain between the Klein Melchtal and the Melchtal.
