= Gwächtenhorn =

Mountain in Switzerland

- Location within Switzerland

Highest point
- Elevation: 3,420 m (11,220 ft)
- Prominence: 218 m (715 ft)
- Parent peak: Dammastock
- Coordinates: 46°41′27″N 8°24′48″E

Geography
- Location: Uri/Bern, Switzerland
- Parent range: Urner Alps

The Gwächtenhorn is a 3,420 metres high mountain in the Urner Alps, located on the border between the cantons of Bern and Uri. It overlooks the Stein Glacier and the Susten Pass on its north side (Bern) and the Chelen Glacier on its south side (Uri).

Being covered by snow from the summit to the bottom, the north side of the Gwächtenhorn is much appreciated by skiers.
