= Giglistock =

Mountain in Switzerland

- Location within Switzerland

Highest point
- Elevation: 2,900 m (9,500 ft)
- Prominence: 166 m (545 ft)
- Parent peak: Dammastock
- Coordinates: 46°42′34.8″N 8°23′11.8″E

Geography
- Location: Bern, Switzerland
- Parent range: Urner Alps

The Giglistock is a mountain of the Urner Alps, located south of Gadmen in the Bernese Oberland.
