= Rorspitzli =

Mountain in Switzerland

- Location within Switzerland

Highest point
- Elevation: 3,220 m (10,560 ft)
- Prominence: 255 m (837 ft)
- Parent peak: Fleckistock
- Coordinates: 46°41′25.5″N 8°31′22″E

Geography
- Location: Uri, Switzerland
- Parent range: Urner Alps

The Rorspitzli is a mountain of the Urner Alps, located west of Wassen and Göschenen in the canton of Uri. It lies on the range east of the Sustenjoch, culminating at the Fleckistock.
