= Eggstock =

Eggstock may refer to two mountains in Switzerland with the same name:

- Eggstock (Uri Alps), in the Uri Alps and in the cantons of Uri and Valais
- Eggstock (Schwyzer Alps), in the Schwyzer Alps and in the cantons of Schwyz and Glarus
