= Hoch Horefellistock =

Mountain in Switzerland

- Location within Switzerland

Highest point
- Elevation: 3,175 m (10,417 ft)
- Prominence: 154 m (505 ft)
- Parent peak: Dammastock
- Coordinates: 46°40′9.9″N 08°28′30.4″E

Geography
- Location: Uri, Switzerland
- Parent range: Urner Alps

The Hoch Horefellistock is a mountain of the Urner Alps, overlooking the Göschenertal in the canton of Uri. On its southern side lies the Göscheneralpsee.
