= Stucklistock =

Mountain in Switzerland

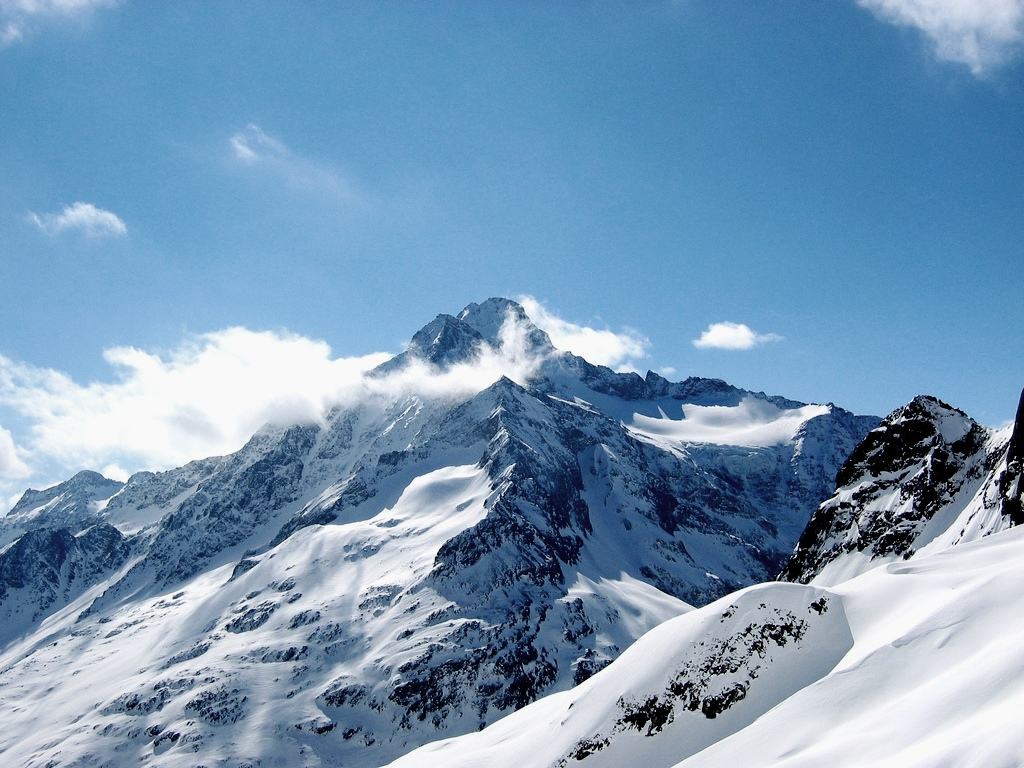
- The north side. The lower summits in the front are Gross and Chli Griessenhorn

Highest point
- Elevation: 3,313 m (10,869 ft)
- Prominence: 148 m (486 ft)
- Parent peak: Fleckistock
- Coordinates: 46°43′1.4″N 8°29′13.6″E

Geography
- Location within Switzerland
- Location: Uri, Switzerland
- Parent range: Urner Alps

The Stucklistock is a mountain in the Urner Alps, overlooking the valley of Meiental in the canton of Uri. It lies only a few kilometres south-east of Susten Pass. The Stucklistock is surrounded by glaciers, the largest, named Rütifirn, lying on its east flank.
