= Diechterhorn =

Mountain in Switzerland

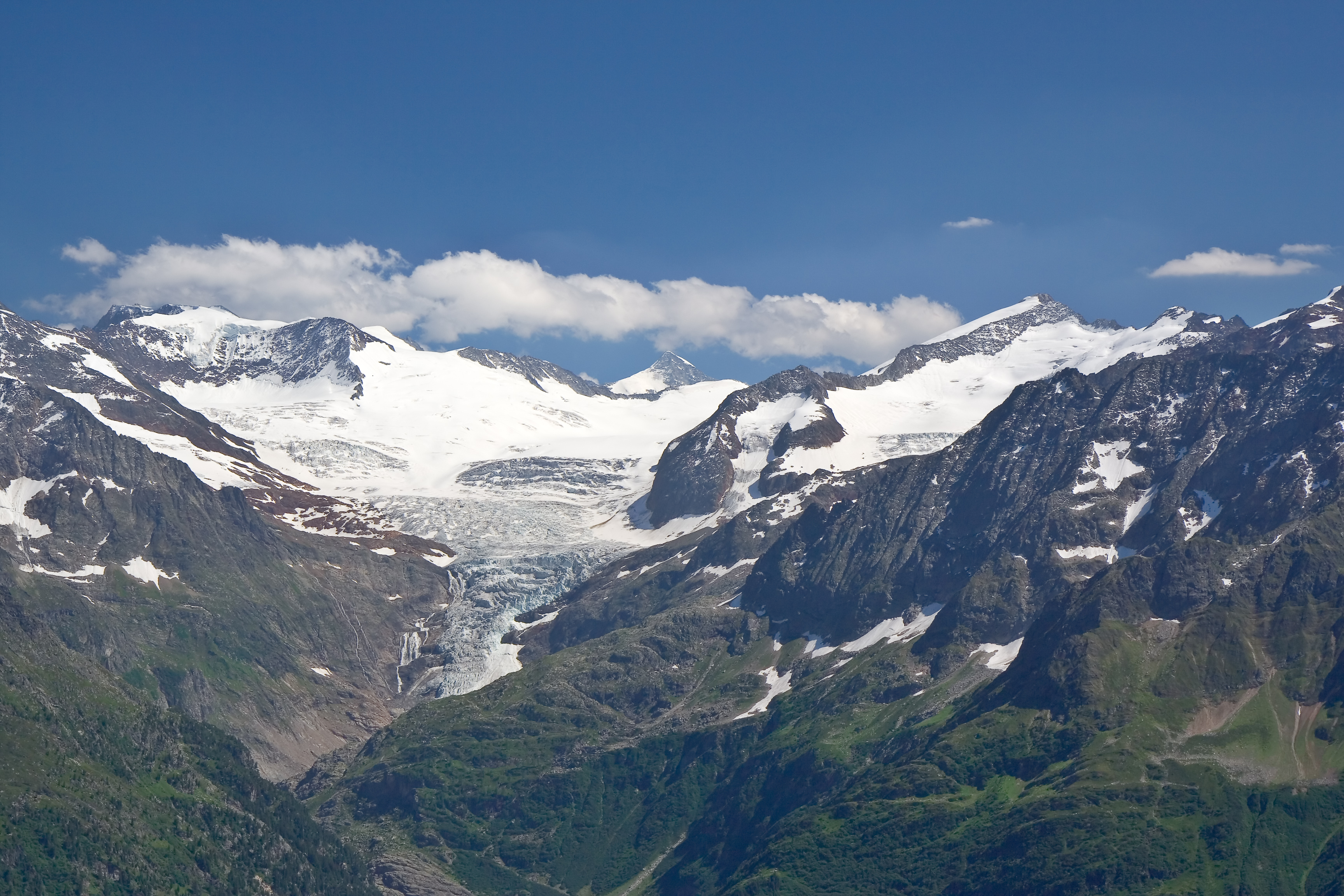
- The Trift Glacier and the Diechtehorn (right summit) from the north side

Highest point
- Elevation: 3,389 m (11,119 ft)
- Prominence: 308 m (1,010 ft)
- Parent peak: Dammastock
- Listing: Alpine mountains above 3000 m
- Coordinates: 46°38′55″N 8°21′38″E

Geography
- Location within Switzerland
- Location: Bern, Switzerland
- Parent range: Urner Alps

The Diechterhorn is a mountain in the Urner Alps, overlooking the Haslital in the Bernese Oberland. At 3,389 metres above sea level it is the highest summit of the Urner Alps lying within the canton of Bern.

On its east side lies the upper basin of the Trift Glacier, the summit of the Dammastock being located about five kilometres east. On its west side lies the Gelmersee at 1,849 metres.

The Gelmer hut, lying at 2,412 metres above the Gelmersee, is the closest hut. It is a common base for climbers.
