= Hochstollen =

Mountain in Switzerland

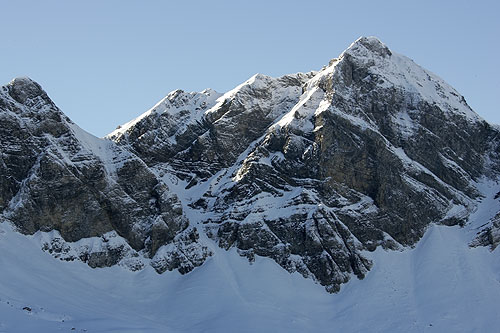
- The east face

Highest point
- Elevation: 2,481 m (8,140 ft)
- Prominence: 160 m (520 ft)
- Parent peak: Glogghüs
- Coordinates: 46°46′25″N 8°14′16″E

Geography
- Location within Switzerland
- Location: Obwalden, Switzerland
- Parent range: Urner Alps

The Hochstollen is a mountain of the Urner Alps, located between the Klein Melchtal and the Melchtal in the canton of Obwalden. The border with the canton of Bern runs south of the summit.

The closest locality is Melchsee-Frutt on its east side.
