= Niederbauen-Chulm =

Mountain in Switzerland

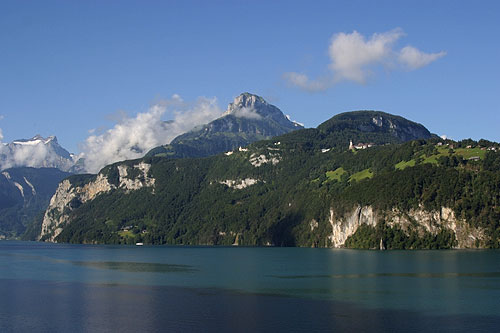
- View from Lake Lucerne

Highest point
- Elevation: 1,923 m (6,309 ft)
- Prominence: 327 m (1,073 ft)
- Coordinates: 46°56′51″N 8°33′24″E

Geography
- Location within Switzerland
- Location: Nidwalden/Uri, Switzerland
- Parent range: Urner Alps

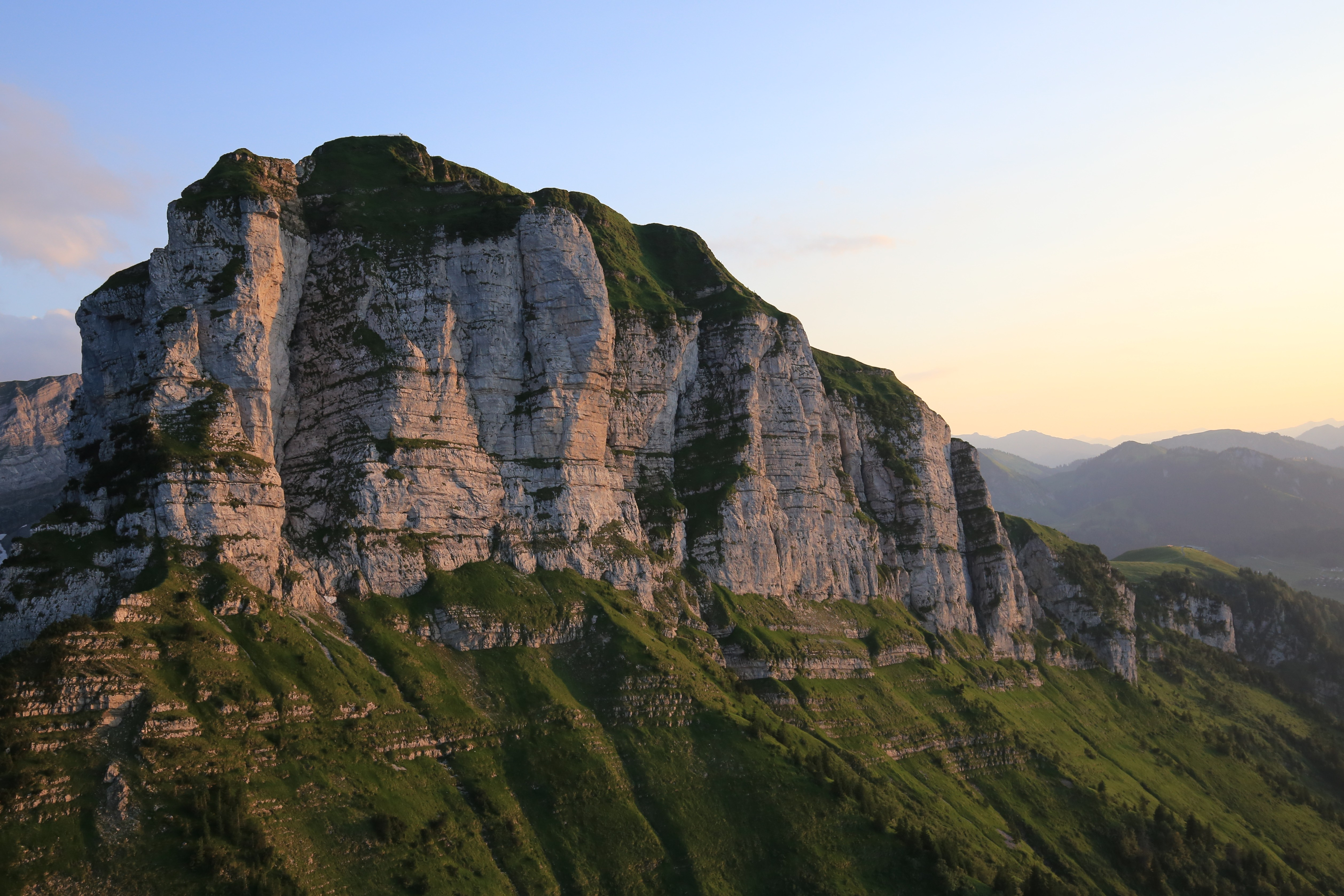
Niederbauen-Chulm's north face

The Niederbauen-Chulm is a mountain of the Urner Alps, overlooking Lake Lucerne in Central Switzerland. Its 1,923 metre high summit is located on the border between the cantons of Nidwalden and Uri.
