= Heitlistock =

Mountain in Switzerland

- Location within Switzerland

Highest point
- Elevation: 2,146 m (7,041 ft)
- Prominence: 284 m (932 ft)
- Coordinates: 46°48′39″N 8°15′02″E

Geography
- Location: Obwalden, Switzerland
- Parent range: Urner Alps

The Heitlistock is a mountain of the Urner Alps, located between the Klein Melchtal and the Melchtal in the canton of Obwalden. It is situated west of Stöckalp.
