= Fleckistock =

Mountain in Switzerland

- Rot Stock
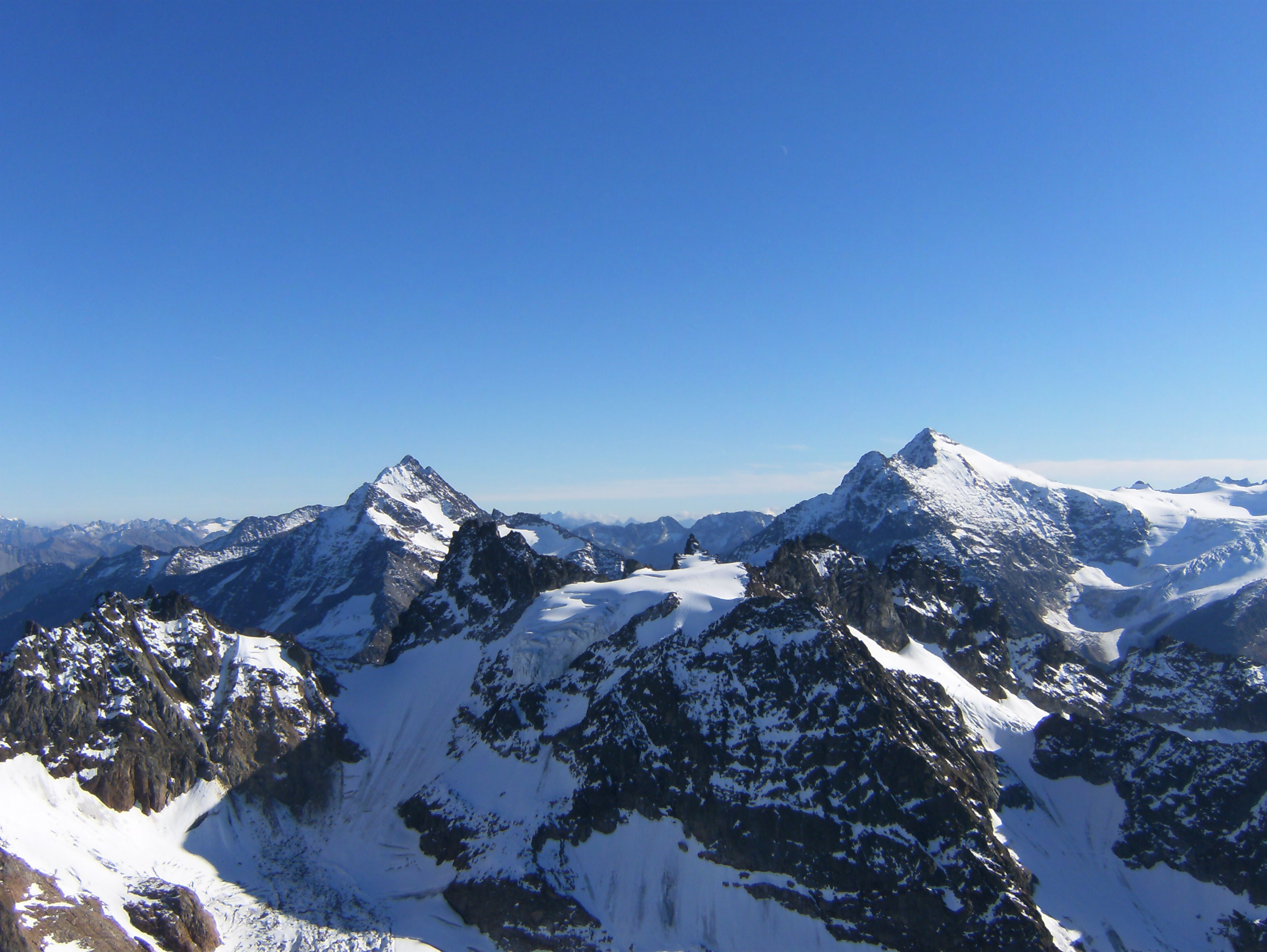
- The Fleckistock (left) and the Sustenhorn (right)

Highest point
- Elevation: 3,417 m (11,211 ft)
- Prominence: 761 m (2,497 ft)
- Parent peak: Dammastock
- Listing: Alpine mountains above 3000 m
- Coordinates: 46°42′26.5″N 8°29′51.6″E

Geography
- Location within Switzerland
- Location: Uri, Switzerland
- Parent range: Urner Alps

The Fleckistock (or Rot Stock) is a 3,417 metres high mountain in the Urner Alps, overlooking Wassen in the canton of Uri. It is the highest summit of the group lying east of the pass of Sustenjoch (2,656 metres). This range, starting at the Stucklistock and ending at the Salbitschijen, separates the valleys of Voralp, above Göschenen and Meiental, above Wassen.

The east flanks of the mountain are covered by glaciers. A glacier named Rütifirn lies on the north-eastern side and another (smaller) named Kartigelfirn lies on the south-east side. The west side is almost free of ice.

The Fleckistock is usually climbed from the south-west side, in the Voralp valley. The Voralp hut, from where starts the normal route, is located a 2,126 metres. It is owned by the Swiss Alpine Club.
