= Gross Bielenhorn =

Mountain in Switzerland

- Location within Switzerland

Highest point
- Elevation: 3,210 m (10,530 ft)
- Coordinates: 46°36′14″N 08°25′41″E

Geography
- Location: Uri, Switzerland
- Parent range: Urner Alps

The Gross Bielenhorn is a mountain in the Urner Alps.
