= Krönten =

Mountain in Switzerland

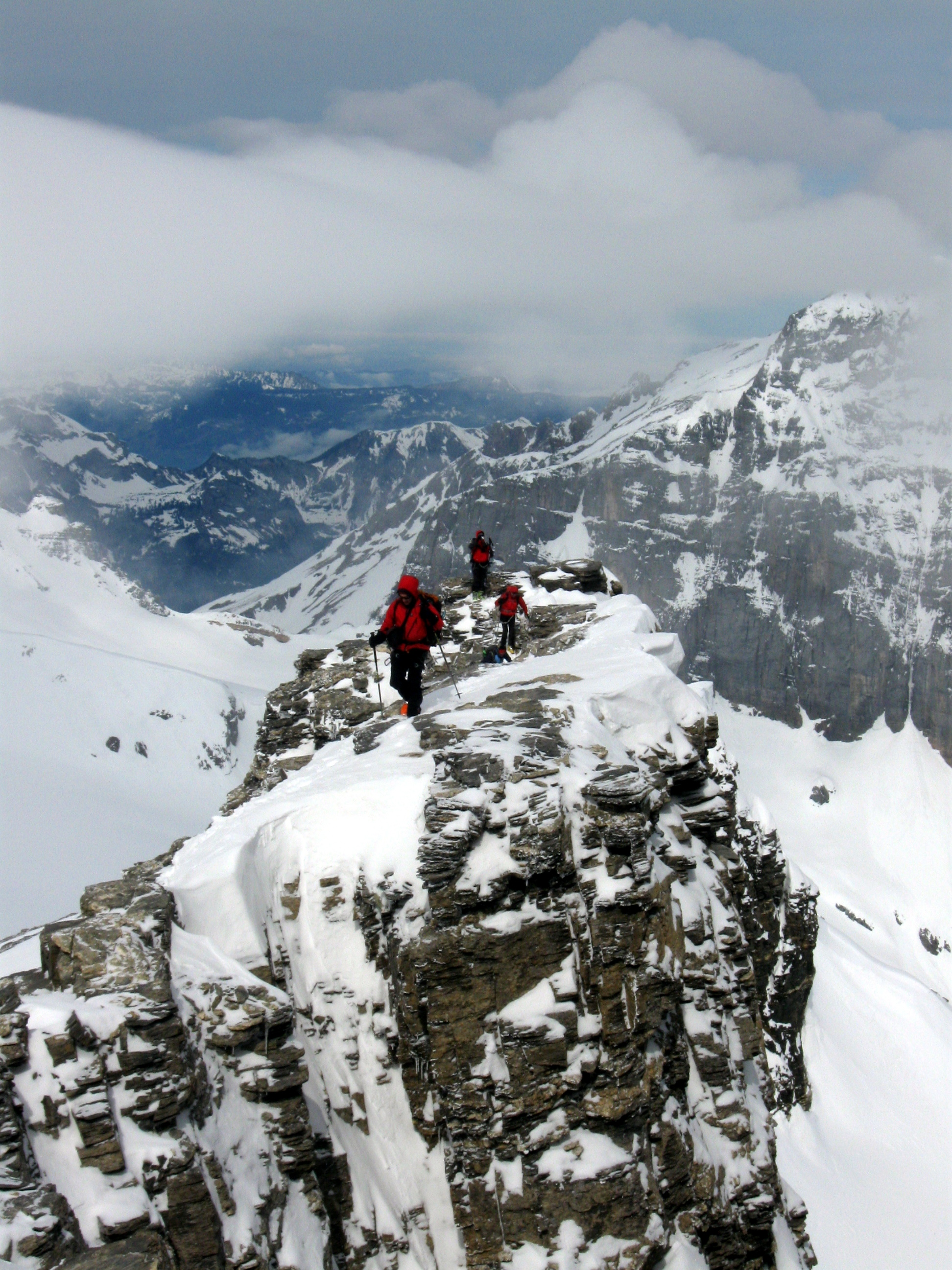
- View from the summit

Highest point
- Elevation: 3,108 m (10,197 ft)
- Prominence: 328 m (1,076 ft)
- Parent peak: Gross Spannort
- Listing: Alpine mountains above 3000 m
- Coordinates: 46°47′00″N 08°34′22″E

Geography
- Location within Switzerland
- Location: Uri, Switzerland
- Parent range: Urner Alps

The Krönten is a mountain of the Urner Alps, overlooking the Reuss valley, in the canton of Uri. Its 3,108 metre high summit lies between the valleys of Erstfeld and Gorneren.
