= Eggstock (Uri Alps) =

Mountain in Switzerland

- Location within Switzerland

Highest point
- Elevation: 3,554 m (11,660 ft)
- Prominence: 14 m (46 ft)
- Parent peak: Dammastock
- Coordinates: 46°39′8.6″N 8°25′2.8″E

Geography
- Location: Uri/Valais
- Country: Switzerland
- Parent range: Uri Alps
- Topo map: Swiss Federal Office of Topography swisstopo

The Eggstock (3,554 m), is a minor prominence of the Uri Alps, forming the northern pillar of the Dammastock on the border between the cantons of Valais and Uri. The tripoint between the cantons of Bern, Valais and Uri (3,500 m) is located 600 m west of the summit.
