= Tiefen Glacier =

Glacier in Switzerland

Coordinates: 46°36′36″N 8°26′9″E

Tiefengletscher

The Tiefen Glacier (German: Tiefengletscher) is a 2.5 km long glacier (2005) situated in the Urner Alps in the canton of Uri in Switzerland. In 1973 it had an area of 3.16 km^{2}.

== See also ==
- List of glaciers in Switzerland
- Swiss Alps
