= Sustenhorn =

Mountain in the Uri Alps, Switzerland

- Aerial view from the southeast

Highest point
- Elevation: 3,502 m (11,490 ft)
- Prominence: 413 m (1,355 ft)
- Parent peak: Dammastock
- Listing: Alpine mountains above 3000 m
- Coordinates: 46°41′57.2″N 8°27′16.7″E

Geography
- Location within Switzerland
- Location: Bern/Uri
- Country: Switzerland
- Parent range: Uri Alps
- Topo map: Swiss Federal Office of Topography swisstopo

The Sustenhorn is a 3,502-metre-high (11,490 ft) mountain in the Uri Alps, located on the border between the cantons of Bern and Uri. It overlooks Susten Pass from the south.

Both sides of the massif are glaciated. On the west side (Bern) lies the Stein Glacier and on the east side (Uri) lies the smaller Flachensteinfirn. The larger massif consists of several other mountains, the principal being Vorder Sustenhorn (3,318 metres), Chli Sustenhorn (3,309 metres) on the north and Sustenlimihorn (3,316 metres) on the south.

It was climbed for the first time in 1851 by a team that took the route from Innertkirchen
