= Uri Alps =

Mountain range in central Switzerland

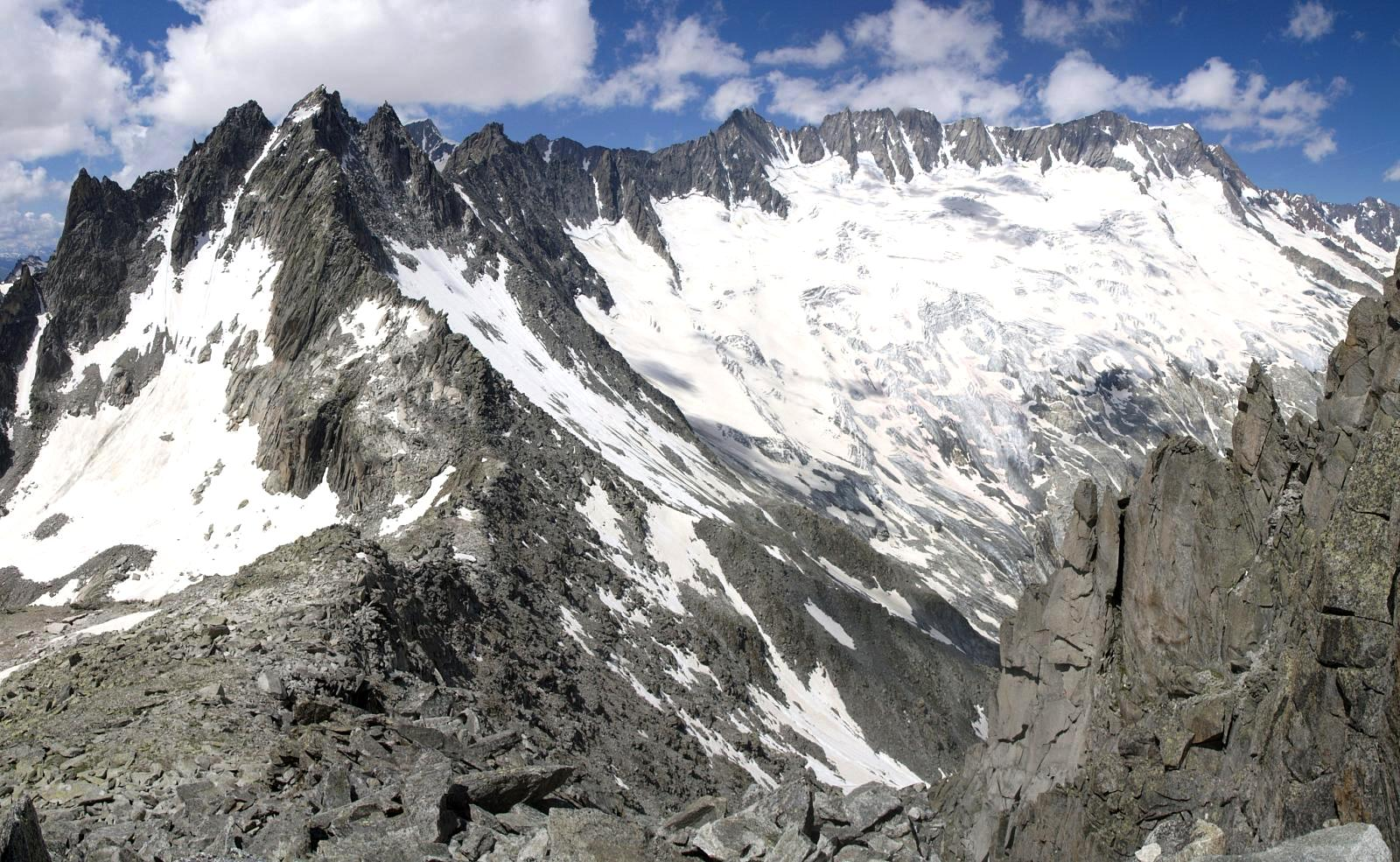
- The Dammastock from the Göscheneralp

Highest point
- Peak: Dammastock
- Elevation: 3,630 m (11,910 ft)
- Coordinates: 46°38′28″N 8°25′6″E

Naming
- Native name: Urner Alpen (German)

Geography
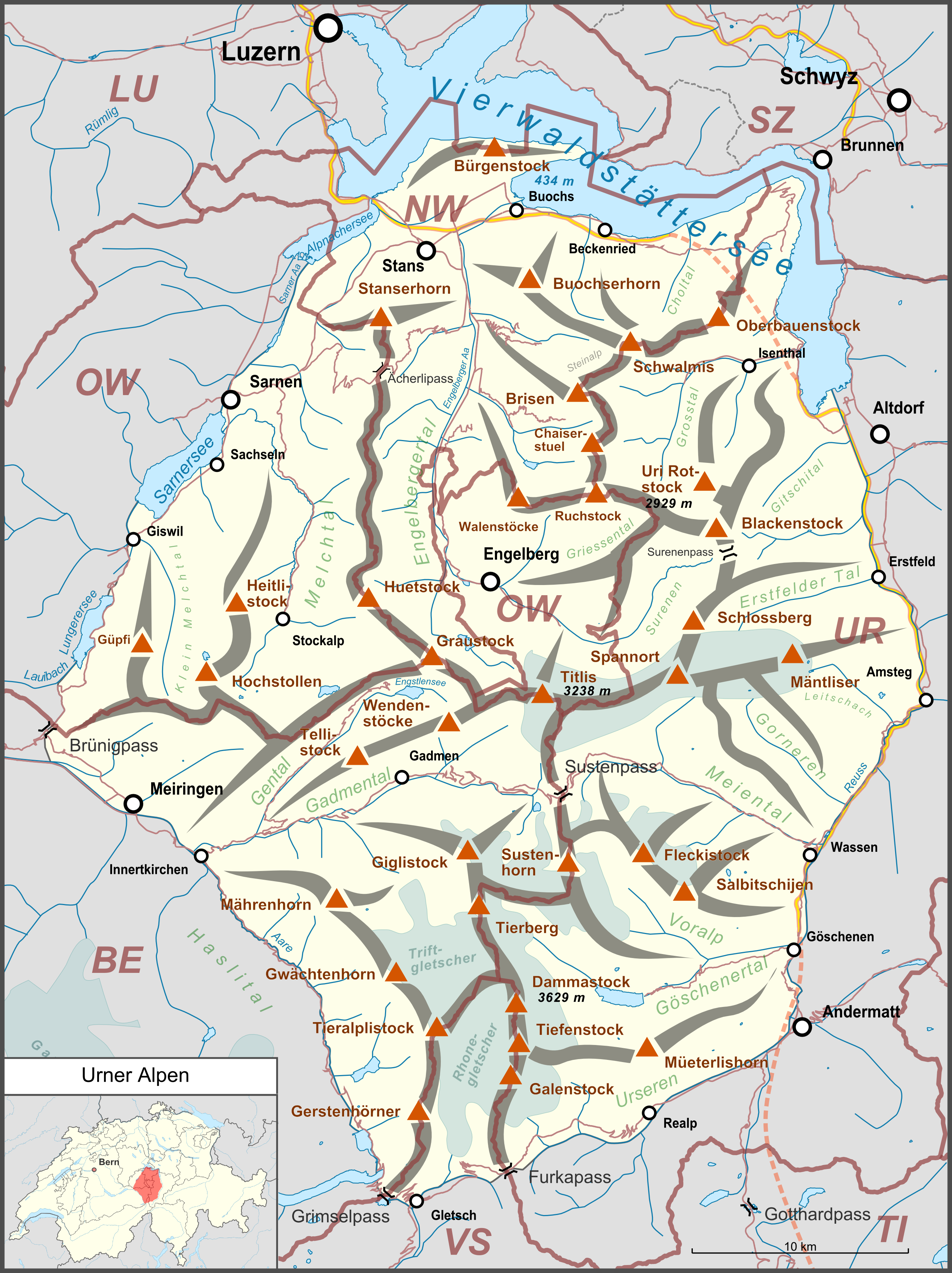
- Country: Switzerland
- Cantons: Bern, Obwalden, Valais, Uri and Nidwalden
- Parent range: Western Alps
- Borders on: Bernese Alps, Emmental Alps, Schwyzer Alps, Glarus Alps and Lepontine Alps
- Topo map: Swiss Federal Office of Topography swisstopo

The Uri Alps (also known as Urner Alps, German: Urner Alpen) is a mountain range in Central Switzerland and part of the Western Alps. They extend into the cantons of Obwalden, Valais, Bern, Uri and Nidwalden and are bordered by the Bernese Alps (Grimsel Pass) and the Emmental Alps to the west (the four lakes: Lungerersee, Sarnersee, Wichelsee, and Alpnachersee), the Schwyzer Alps to the north (Lake Lucerne), the Lepontine Alps to the south (the valley of Urseren with Andermatt) and the Glarus Alps to the east (Reuss).

The Uri Alps are composed of two distinct groups separated by the Susten Pass. The Dammastock massif on the south is the most glaciated part while the northern part, which culminates on Titlis, has lower summits but greater extent.

== Geography ==
The group south of the Susten Pass forms the dividing range between the head waters of the Aare (west) from those of the Reuss. In addition a small portion of the range (south-west) is located in the basin of the Rhone. This part lies entirely within the valley of the Rhone Glacier. This group forms a complex mass including four considerable ridges and attains its greatest height at the Dammastock and the Galenstock. The group includes four nearly parallel ridges running NNW. and SSE. That forming the eastern boundary of the valley of Hasli reaches 3,383 metres at the Tieralplistock, whence it extends NNW. to the Mährenhorn, and south to the Gärstenhörner. A wide reservoir of snow whence the Trift Glacier flows to the north and the Rhone Glacier to the south, divides this range from the more easterly range whose highest point is the Dammastock. North of the Dammastock the range collectively known as the Hinter Tierberg, attains 3,447 metres. Further east than the last is the Sustenhorn range, rising at its highest point to 3,505 metres, divided from the last by the Stein Glacier and the upper part of the Göschenental. Lastly, another ridge still further east is separated from the last by the Voralptal, a branch of the Göschenental. Its highest summits are the Fleckistock and the Stucklistock. The lower part of the Göschenental is bounded on the south by a range running west to east diverging from the ridge between the Dammastock and the Galenstock.

On the north side of the Susten Pass the ranges are lower and, except the highest mountains on the south, free of glaciers. The main ridge, culminating at the Titlis divides the basins of the Aare and the Reuss. From the Grassen, tripoint border between the cantons of Bern, Obwalden and Uri, a small range diverges from the main watershed and runs from west to east and culminates at the Gross Spannort.

== Principal summits ==
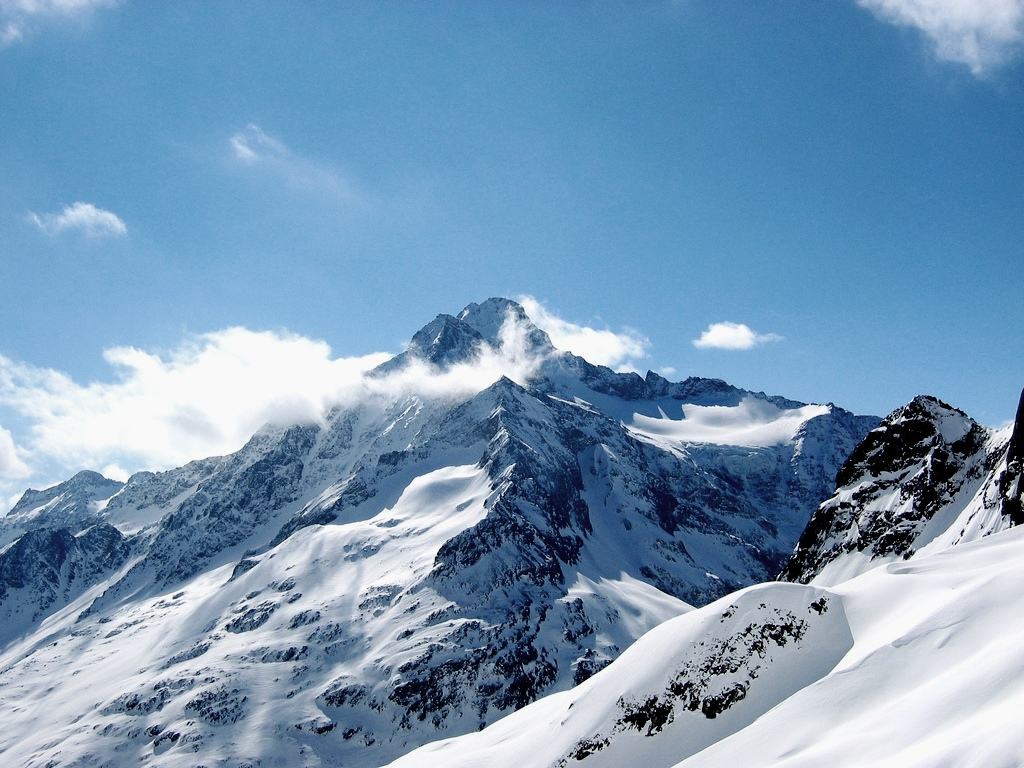
Sustenhorn

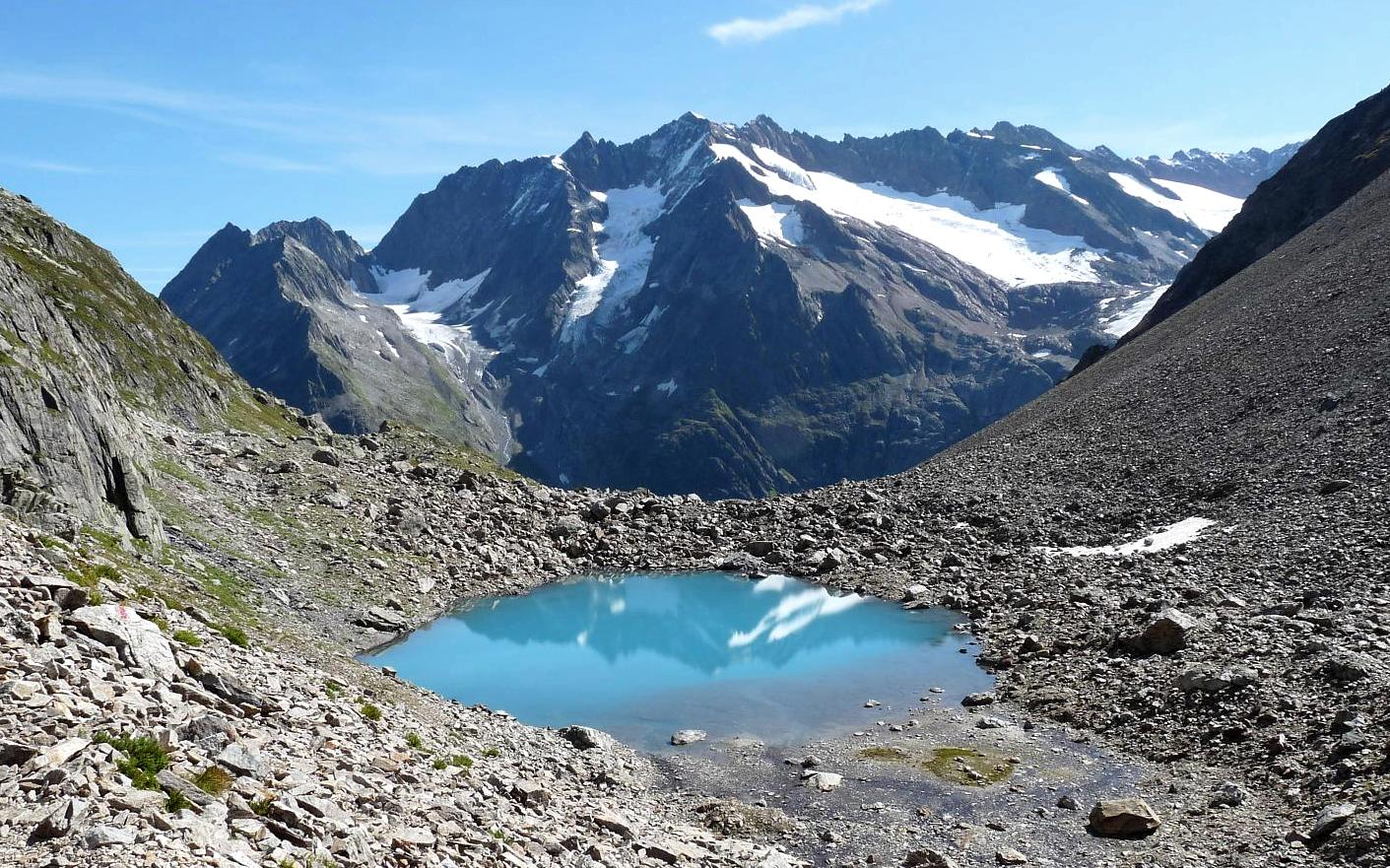
Hinter Tierberg

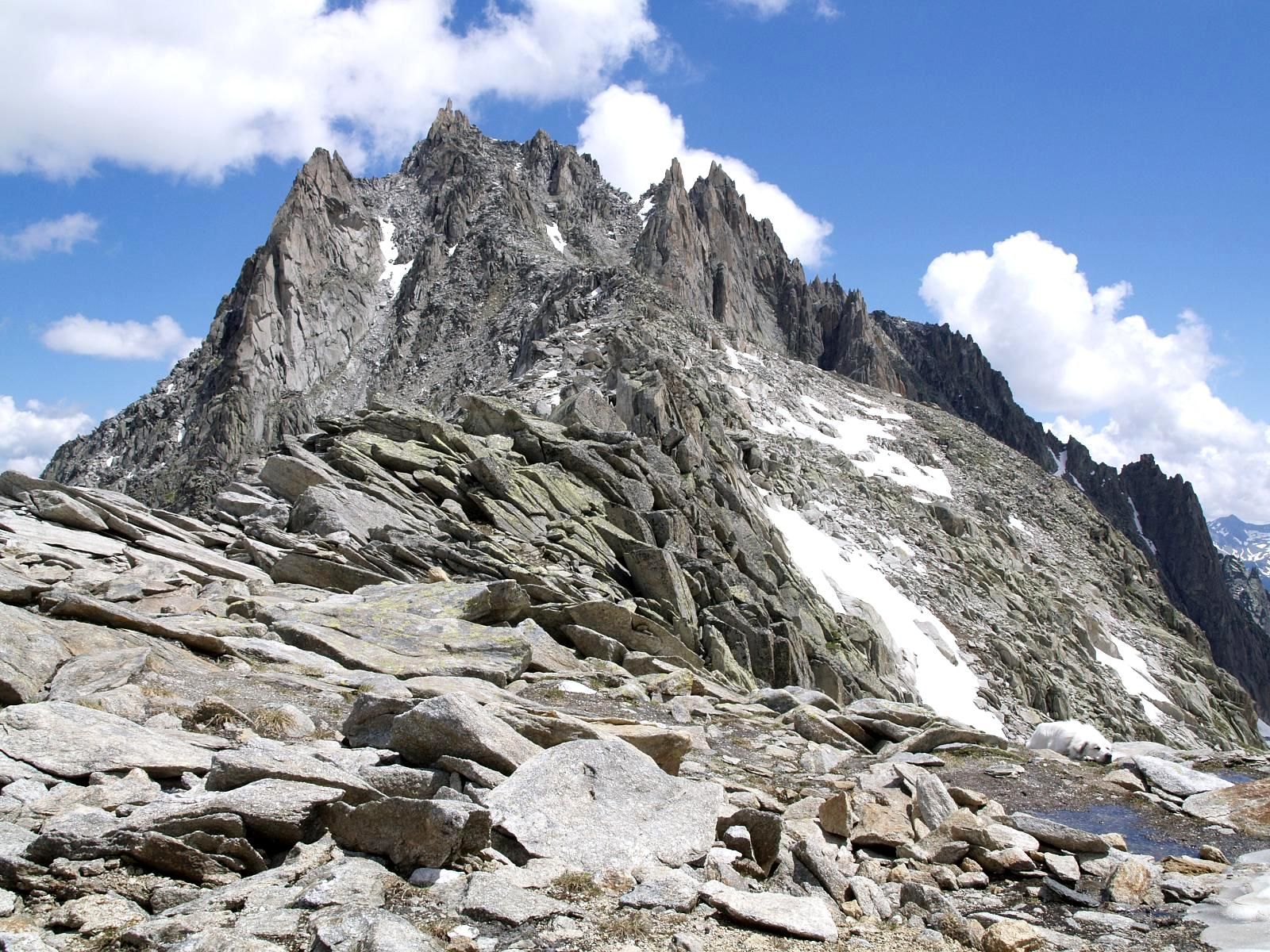
Lochberg

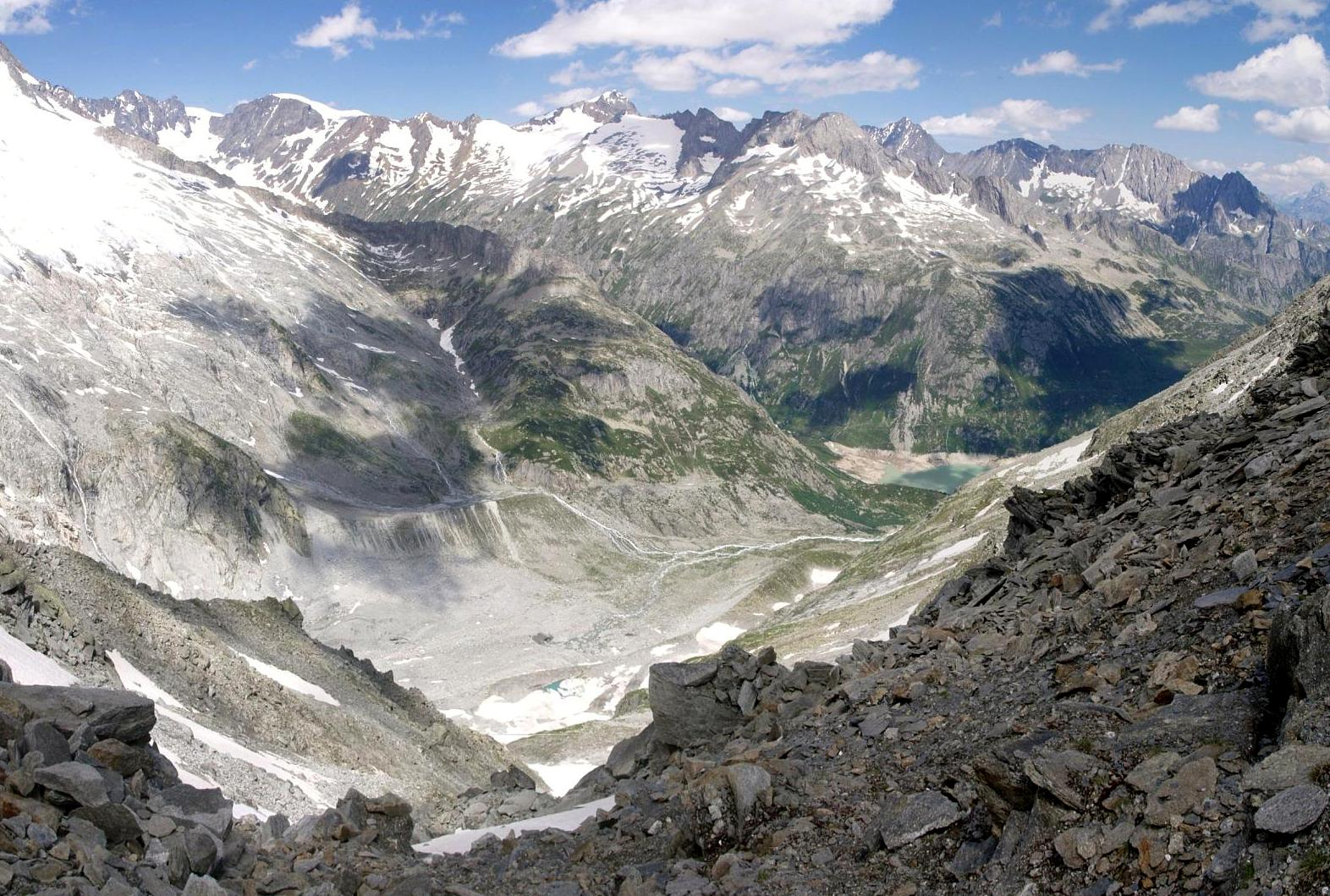
View from above Göscheneralpsee

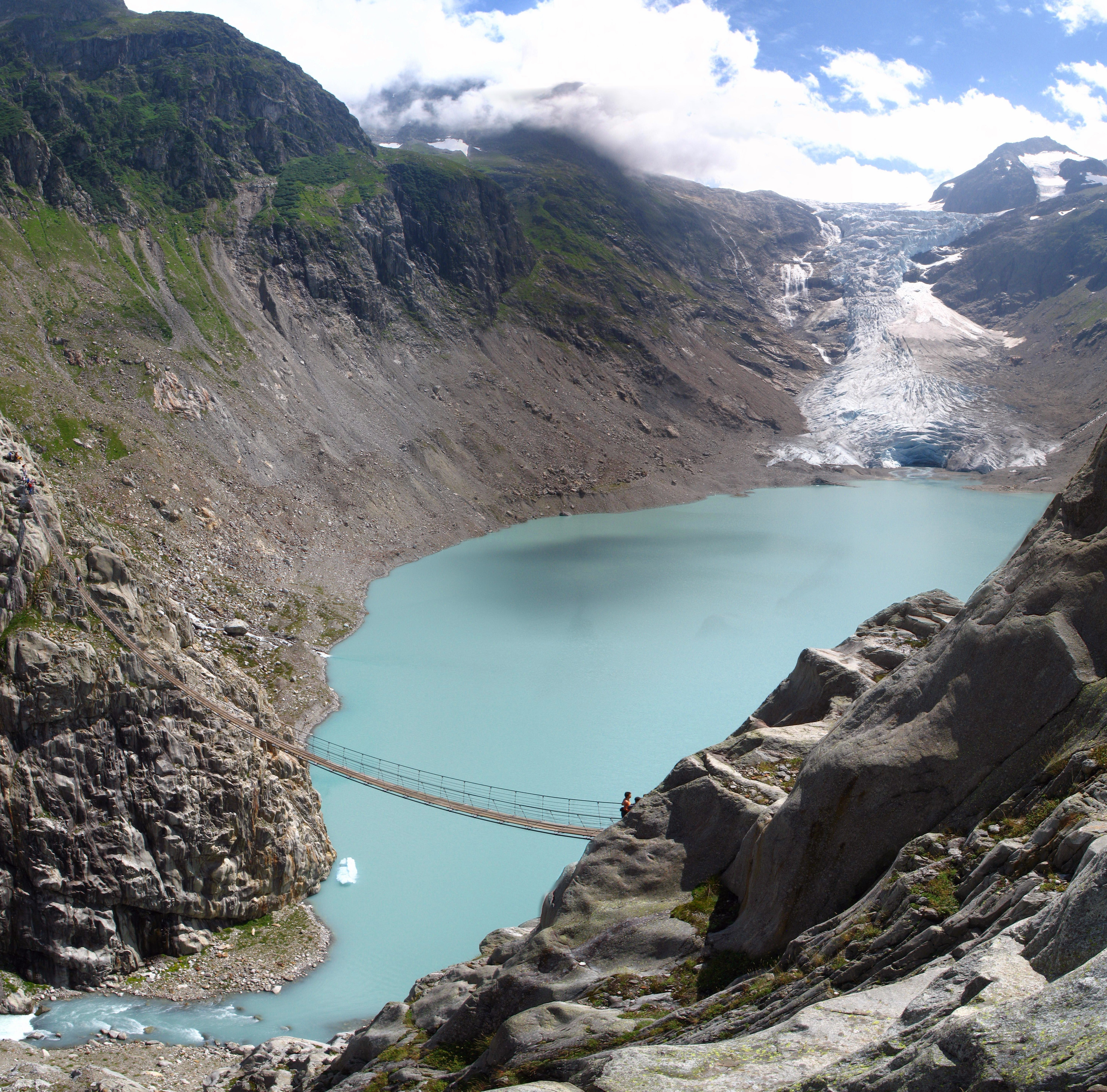
Trift Glacier

The principal summits of the Uri Alps are:

1. Dammastock, 3630 m
2. Schneestock, 3608 m
3. Rhonestock, 3588 m
4. Galenstock, 3586 m
5. Eggstock, 3556 m
6. Tiefenstock, 3515 m
7. Sustenhorn, 3502 m
8. Hinter Tierberg, 3447 m
9. Gwächtenhorn, 3420 m
10. Mittlerer Tierberg, 3418 m
11. Fleckistock, 3416 m
12. Maasplanggstock, 3401 m
13. Wysse Nollen, 3398 m
14. Diechterhorn, 3389 m
15. Tieralplistock, 3382 m
16. Chli Sustenhorn, 3318 m
17. Vorderes Sustenlimihorn, 3316 m
18. Stucklistock, 3308 m
19. Gletschhorn, 3305 m
20. Titlis, 3238 m
21. Rorspitzli, 3220 m
22. Sidelenhorn, 3217 m
23. Gwächtenhorn, 3214 m
24. Brunnenstock, 3210 m
25. Chüeplanggenstock, 3207 m
26. Gross Bielenhorn, 3207 m
27. Voralphorn, 3203 m
28. Winterstock, 3203 m
29. Chelenalphorn, 3202 m
30. Gross Griessenhorn, 3202 m
31. Gross Spannort, 3198 m
32. Hinteres Sustenlimihorn, 3194 m
33. Gärstenhörner, 3189 m
34. Limistock, 3189 m
35. Tällistock, 3185 m
36. Rotstock, 3183 m
37. Hoch Horefellistock, 3175 m
38. Gross Furkahorn, 3169 m
39. Winterberg, 3167 m
40. Chli Spannort, 3140 m
41. Hinter Schloss (Schlossberg), 3132 m
42. Steinhüshorn, 3121 m
43. Chilchlistock, 3114 m
44. Krönten, 3107 m
45. Hintere Gelmerhörner, 3100 m
46. Vorderer Tierberg, 3091 m
47. Zwächten, 3078 m
48. Lochberg, 3074 m
49. Müeterlishorn, 3066 m
50. Wendenstöcke, 3042 m
51. Blauberg, 3039 m
52. Triftstöckli, 3035 m
53. Klein Titlis, 3028 m
54. Klein Furkahorn, 3026 m
55. Wendenhorn, 3023 m
56. Spitzli, 3011 m
57. Bächenstock, 3008 m
58. Reissend Nollen, 3003 m
59. Mittagstock, 2,989 m
60. Giglistock, 2900 m
61. Engelberger Rotstock, 2818 m
62. Radlefshorn, 2603 m
63. Hochstollen, 2481 m
64. Wandelen, 2105 m

== Glaciers ==
Main glaciers :

- Rhone Glacier
- Trift Glacier
- Stein Glacier
- Tiefen Glacier
- Chelen Glacier
- Damma Glacier
