= Chelen Glacier =

Glacier in Switzerland

Coordinates: 46°40′42″N 8°24′38″E

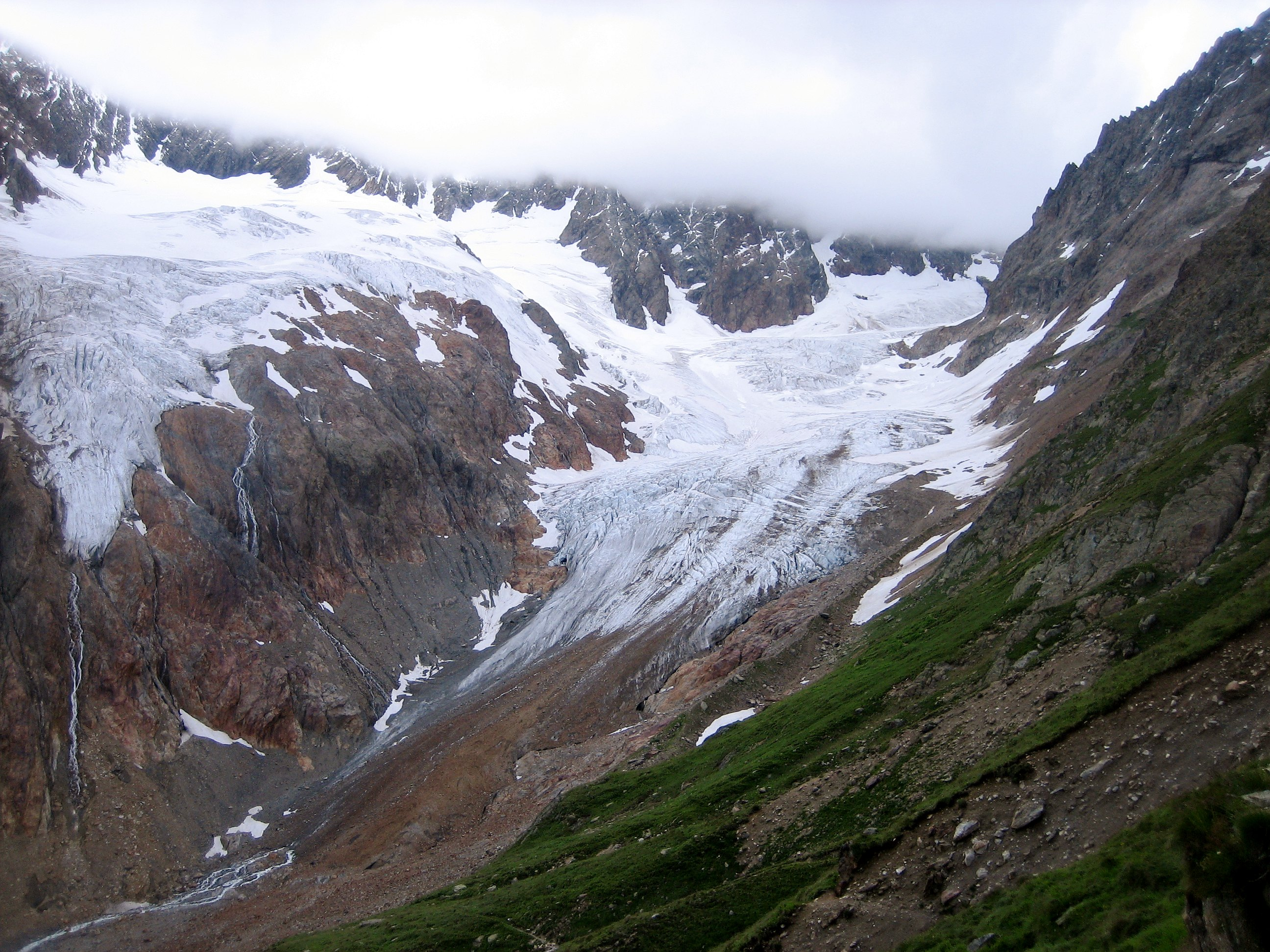
The Chelen Glacier

The Chelen Glacier (German: Chelengletscher) is a 2.5 km long glacier (2005) situated in the Urner Alps in the canton of Uri in Switzerland. In 1973 it had an area of 3.15 km^{2}.

== See also ==
- List of glaciers in Switzerland
- Swiss Alps
