= Galenstock =

Mountain in Switzerland

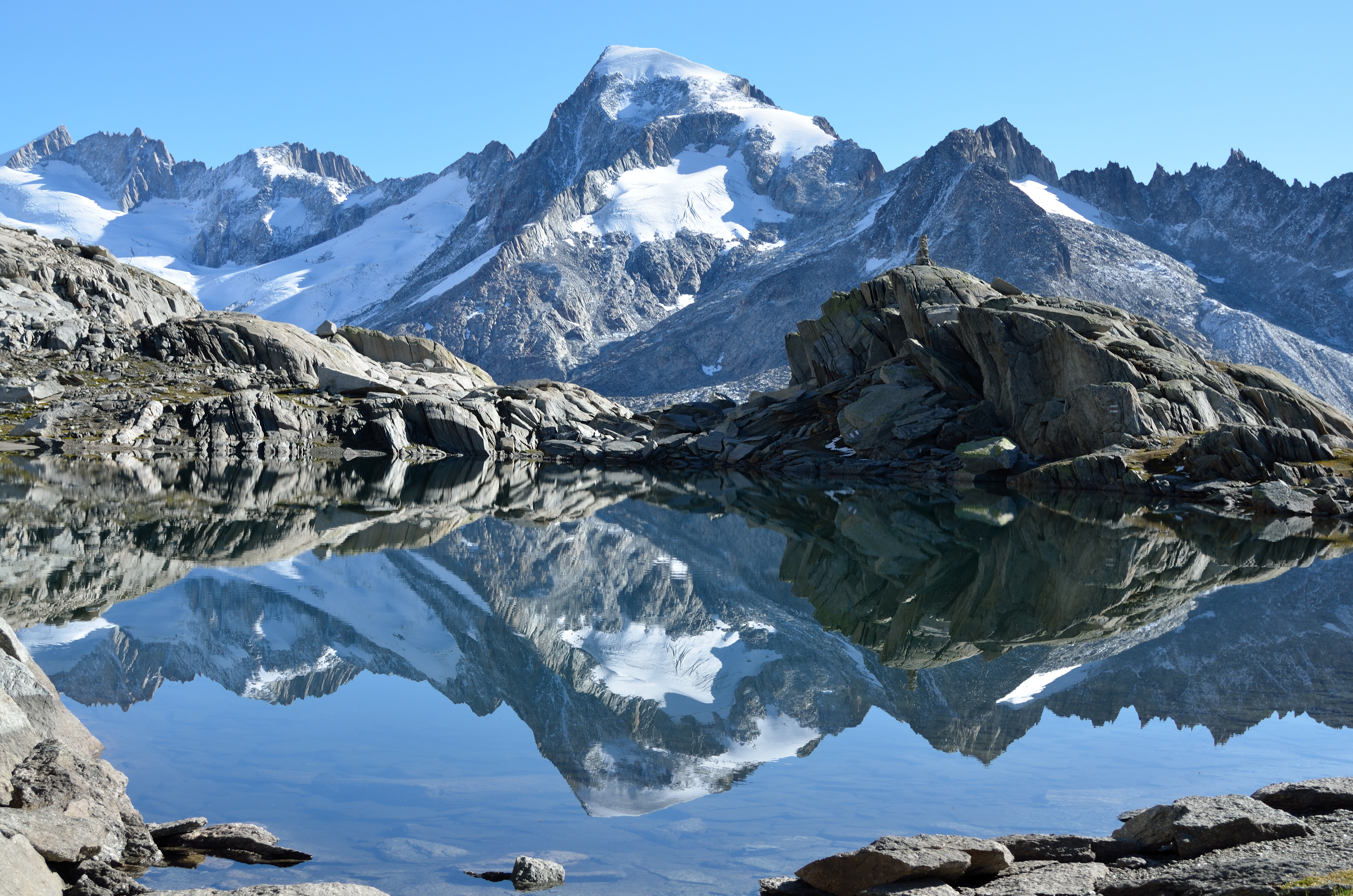
- The Galenstock from the west (Grütlisee)

Highest point
- Elevation: 3,586 m (11,765 ft)
- Prominence: 252 m (827 ft)
- Parent peak: Dammastock
- Isolation: 2.4 km (1.5 mi) to Hinterer Rhonestock
- Coordinates: 46°36′43″N 8°25′01″E

Geography
- Location within Switzerland
- Location: Uri/Valais, Switzerland
- Parent range: Urner Alps

Climbing
- First ascent: 18 August 1845 by Eduard Desor, Daniel Dollfuss Sr., and Daniel Dollfuss Jr., with guides H. Währen, M. Bannholzer, P. Brigger and H. Jaun
- Easiest route: From Hotel Belvédère over the Rhone Glacier

The Galenstock (3,586 m) is the fourth highest mountain in the Urner Alps in Switzerland. Its summit ridge lies on the border between the cantons of Uri and the Valais.

It was first climbed by Eduard Desor, Daniel Dollfuss Sr., and Daniel Dollfuss Jr., with guides H. Währen, M. Bannholzer, P. Brigger and H. Jaun on 18 August 1845.

== Huts ==
- Hotel Tiefenbach (2,109 m)
- Albert Heim hut (2,542 m)
