= Urseren =

Valley in Switzerland

Coordinates: 46°38′N 8°32′E

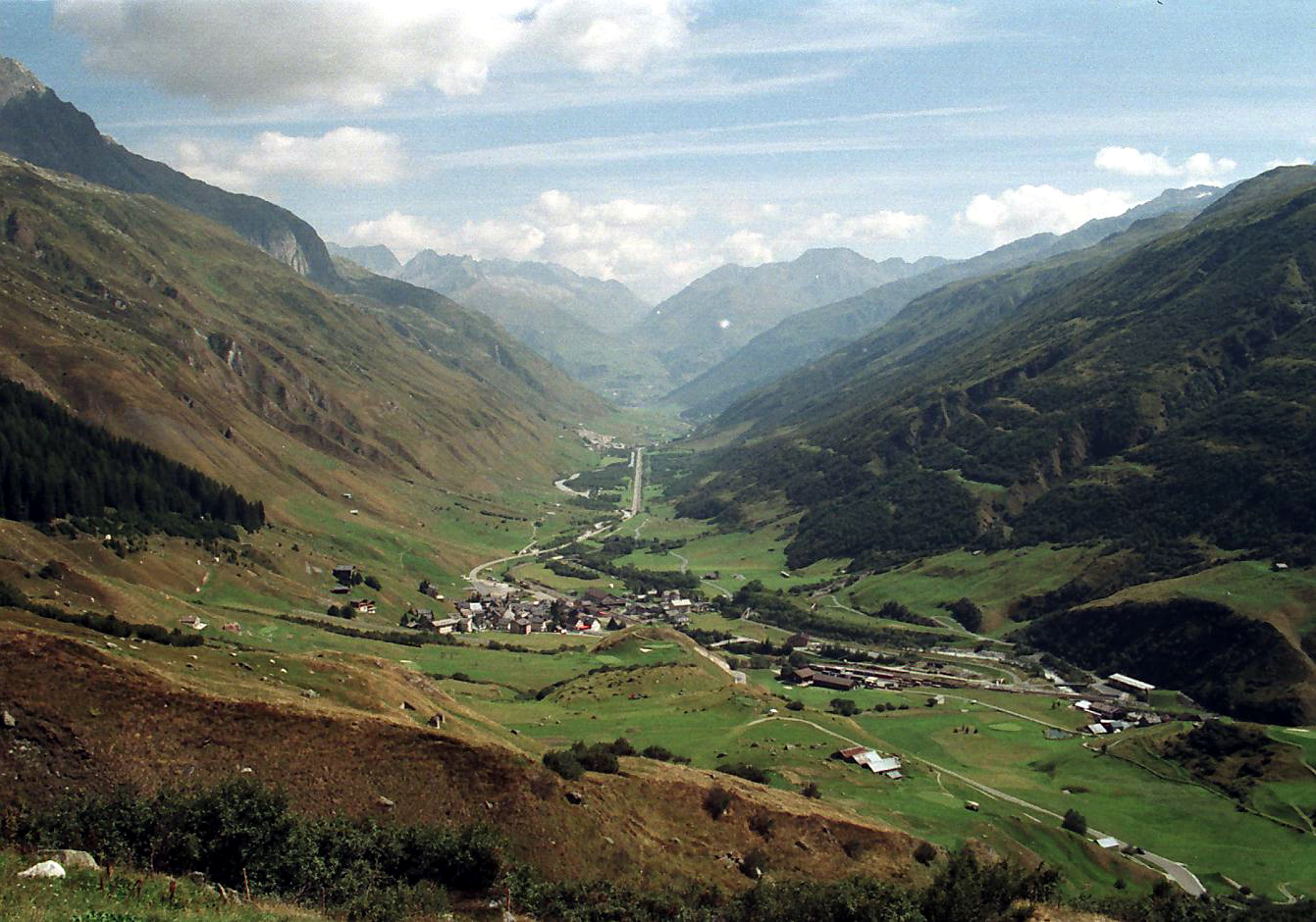
View of the Urseren, looking east down on Realp

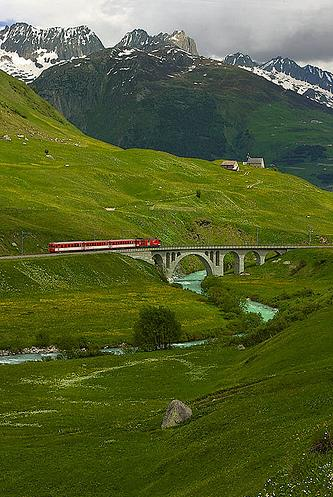
Train on the Furka Line

Coat of arms

Flag

The Urseren (also Ursern) is an Alpine valley above 1400 m a.s.l. of the upper Reuss in Uri, Switzerland, running southwest to northeast, from Realp to Hospental and Andermatt.

Separated from the main valley of Uri, it forms the central transport cross in the central Swiss Alps that connects to the Valais via the Furkapass to the west, to the Grisons via the Oberalppass to the east, to the Ticino via the Gotthard Pass to the south, and via the Schöllenen to the Urner Reuss Valley to the north.

The valley was in possession of Disentis Abbey from 800. It was colonized by Walser settlers prior to the 12th century.

The Blutgericht lay with the counts of Rapperswil from 1232, in 1283 passing to the house of Habsburg, and in 1317 to local nobility of Uri. In 1332, there was a skirmish between settlers and troops of the abbey's at Oberalp, resulting in a defeat of Disentis. Urseren became reichsfrei in 1382 and joined the Old Swiss Confederacy in 1410, and associated itself with Uri for purposes of defence and external representation, however retaining privileges as an independent territory. In 1649, Urseren bought itself out of the last remaining ties to Disentis.

In 1798, the Urseren became part of the canton of Waldstätten of the Helvetic Republic, and in 1803 became part of the canton of Uri. In 1946, there were riots over a disputed dam project which intended to flood the entire valley. The project was never realized; instead, Göscheneralpsee reservoir was built in the upper Göschenen Valley in 1960. The project was proposed in 1941, after a first project of 1920 had to be abandoned. In 1946, engineer Karl Fetz was "chased out of town" and the architect's office was vandalized. It is known as the Krawall von Andermatt on 19 February 1946. The project was abandoned in the early 1950s in favour of the Göschenen dam.
