= Damma Glacier =

Glacier in Switzerland

Coordinates: 46°37′59″N 8°26′3″E

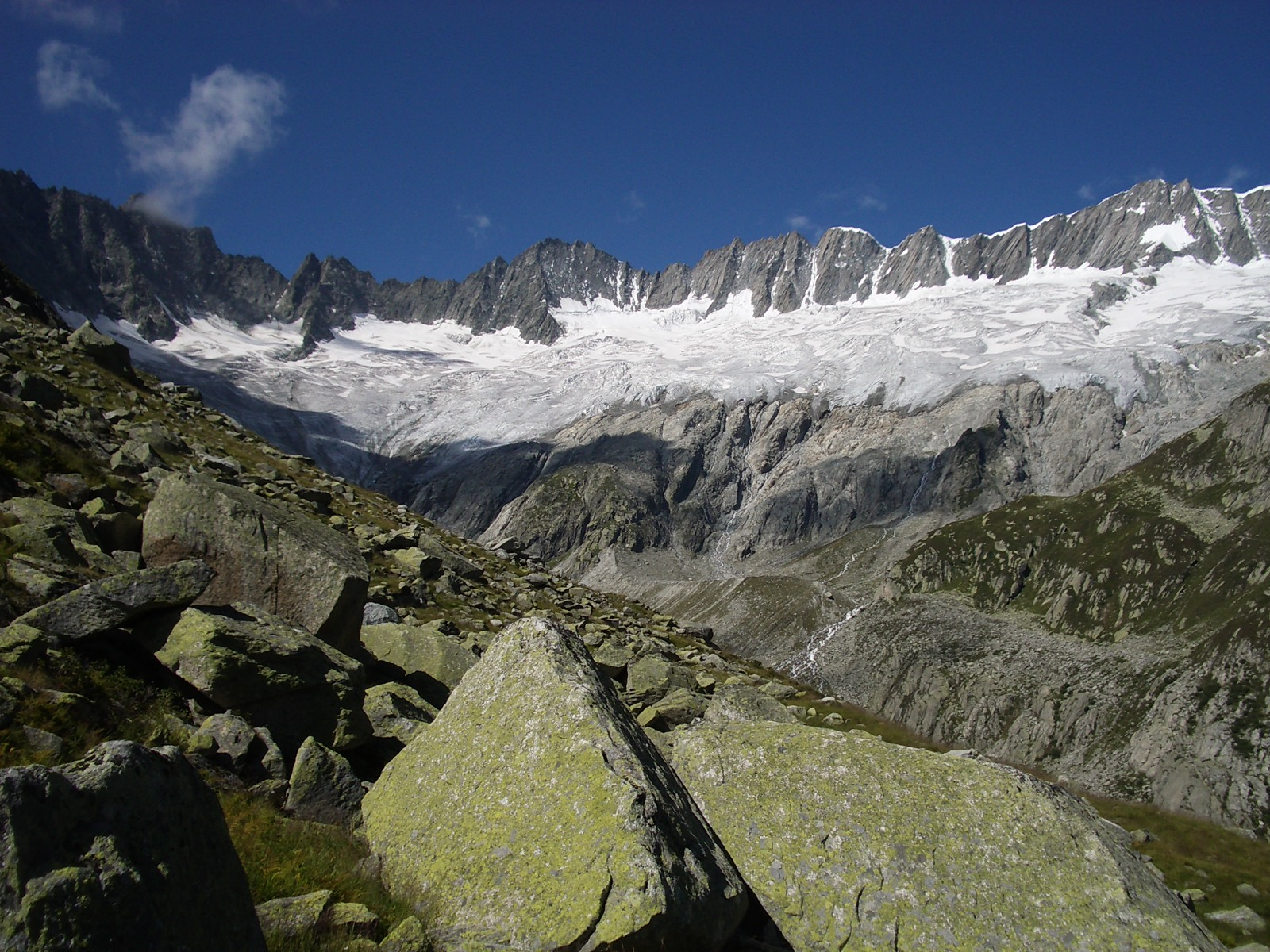
Damma Glacier

The Damma Glacier (German: Dammagletscher) is a small glacier situated in the central Swiss Alps. It has been in retreat since around 1850. The area between the front of the retreating glacier and the moraine from the most recent glacier recession – called the glacial forefield – measures 10.7 square kilometres (4.1 mi^{2}) and is composed of granitic rocks.

== See also ==
- List of glaciers in Switzerland
- Swiss Alps
