= Göscheneralpsee =

- Location within Canton of Uri Location within Switzerland Location within Alps
- Interactive map of Göscheneralpsee
- Location: Göschenen, Canton of Uri
- Coordinates: 46°38′43″N 8°29′4″E
- Type: reservoir
- Primary inflows: glacial runoff
- Catchment area: 42.3 km^{2} (16.3 sq mi)
- Basin countries: Switzerland
- Max. length: 2.73 kilometres (1.70 mi)
- Max. width: 0.83 kilometres (0.52 mi)
- Surface area: 1.32 km^{2} (0.51 sq mi)
- Max. depth: 106 m (348 ft)
- Water volume: 0.076 cubic kilometres (62,000 acre⋅ft)
- Surface elevation: 1,792 m (5,879 ft)
- Frozen: November–April

Göscheneralpsee is a reservoir in the municipality of Göschenen, Canton of Uri, Switzerland. The volume of the reservoir is 76 million cubic metres (62,000 acre⋅ft) and its surface area 1.32 km^{2} (0.51 sq mi).

== See also ==
- List of lakes of Switzerland
- List of mountain lakes of Switzerland
