= Trift Glacier =

Glacier in the Urner Alps near Gadmen

- Triftgletscher
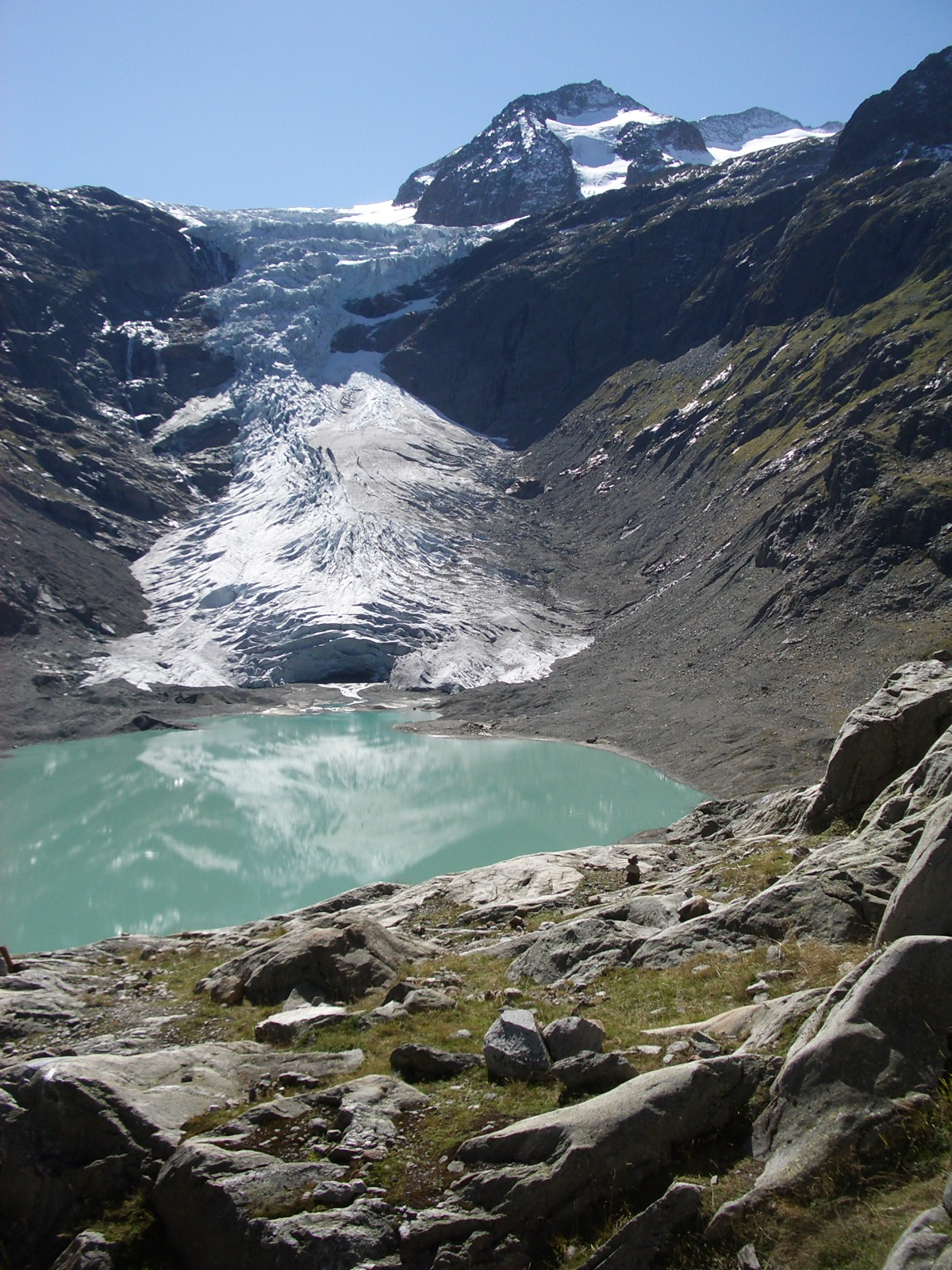
- Trift Glacier in September 2007

- Location within Switzerland
- Location: Canton of Bern, Switzerland
- Coordinates: 46°39′40″N 8°22′40″E
- Length: 5.4 km (3.4 mi)

The Trift Glacier (German: Triftgletscher) is a valley glacier near Gadmen, in the canton of Bern, Switzerland. Since systematic measurements began in 1861, the glacier has retreated significantly, leading to the formation of a proglacial lake in 1998. In 2004, the Trift Bridge was built over the lake to restore access to a nearby mountain hut after the glacier's retreat made the previous route impassable.

== Morphology and retreat ==
The Trift Glacier is a northwest-facing valley glacier in the canton of Bern. In 2016 it covered an area of 14.5 km^{2} and extended 5.4 km in length, with its elevation ranging from 3386 m down to about 2120 m above sea level. The upper part lies in a basin about 3 km wide, narrowing below 2700 m where steep slopes lead to the formation of large séracs. At about 2400 m it receives a tributary separated by the Triftstöckli, before descending a 35° rock step toward the basin that formerly held its tongue.

Until the 1990s the glacier terminus remained stable at the base of this basin near 1652 m elevation. Length-change records show that from 1861 to 1929 the glacier advanced by about 1200 m, followed by a sustained retreat. A proglacial lake began to form in 1998, and during the hot summer of 2003 the glacier retreated by 136 m in a single year. The lower section detached in 2012 and has since melted away. By 2016 the cumulative retreat had reached about 3900 m, and by 2023 the total was 4383 m since systematic measurements began in 1861.

== Tourism ==
The Trifthütte, a mountain hut of the Swiss Alpine Club (SAC), was once reached by crossing the Trift Glacier tongue. As the glacier receded, this route became impassable, and in 2004 a suspension footbridge was built to restore access. Modelled on Nepalese designs, it spans a lake formed by the meltwater of the Trift Glacier. The bridge, 100 metres high and 170 metres long, is among the longest and highest pedestrian suspension bridges in the Alps.

== Gallery ==
Trift Glacier retreat since 1864

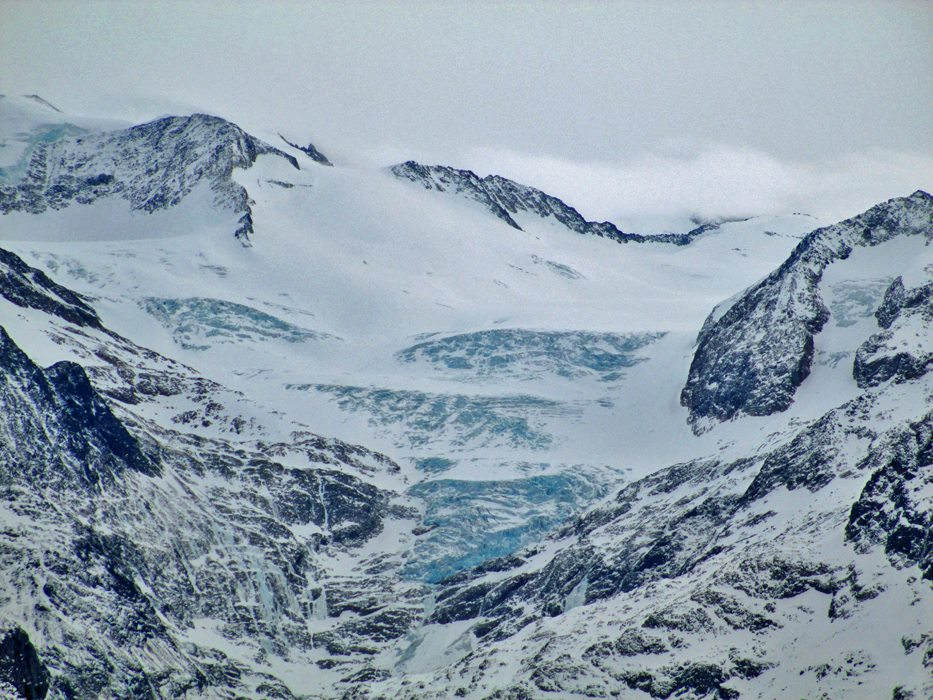
Trift Glacier viewed from the south, winter 2014

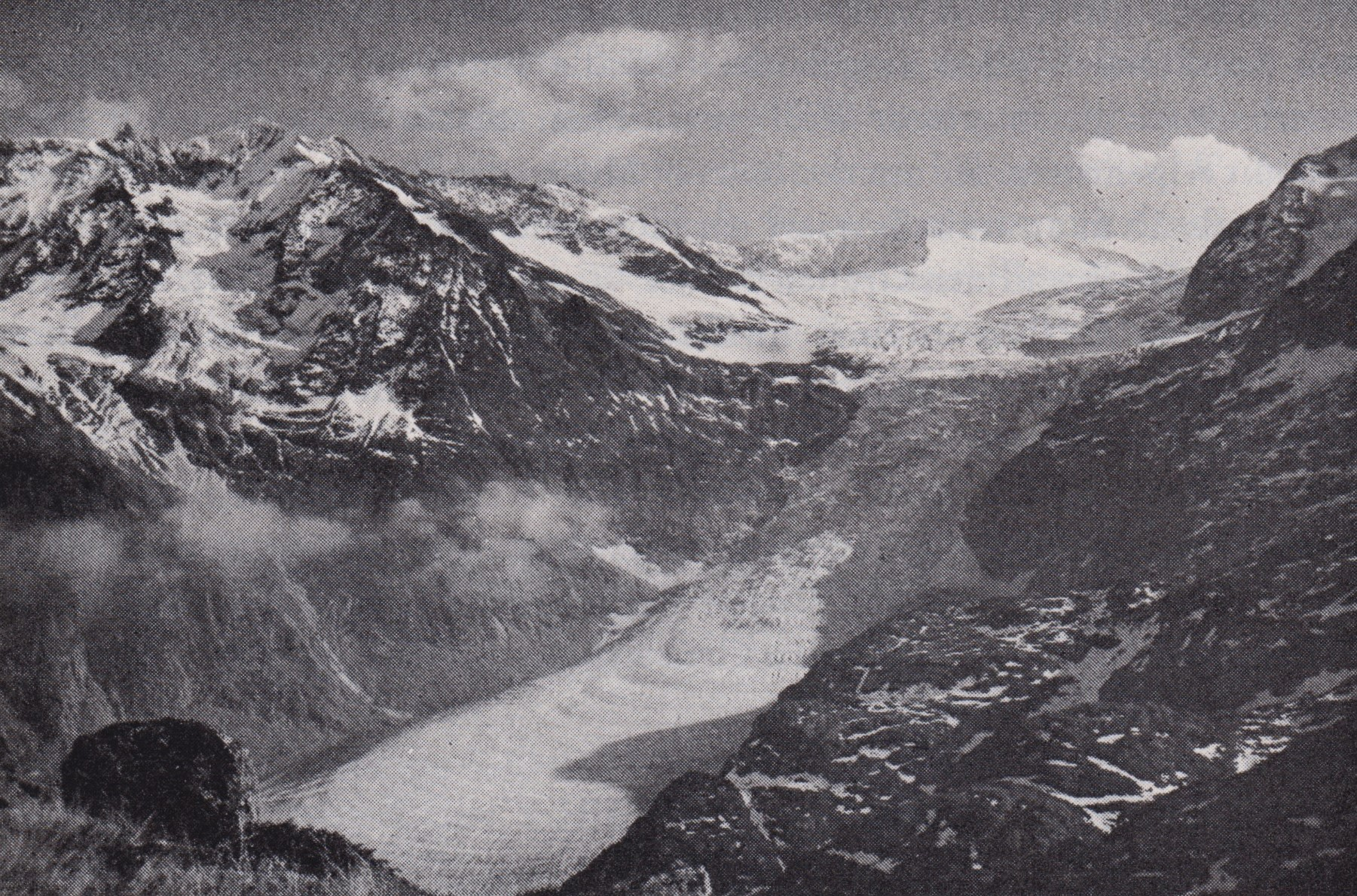
Tongue of the Trift Glacier in summer 1971, before the formation of Triftsee

== See also ==
- List of glaciers in Switzerland
- Swiss Alps
- Trift Bridge
