= Dammastock =

Mountain in Switzerland

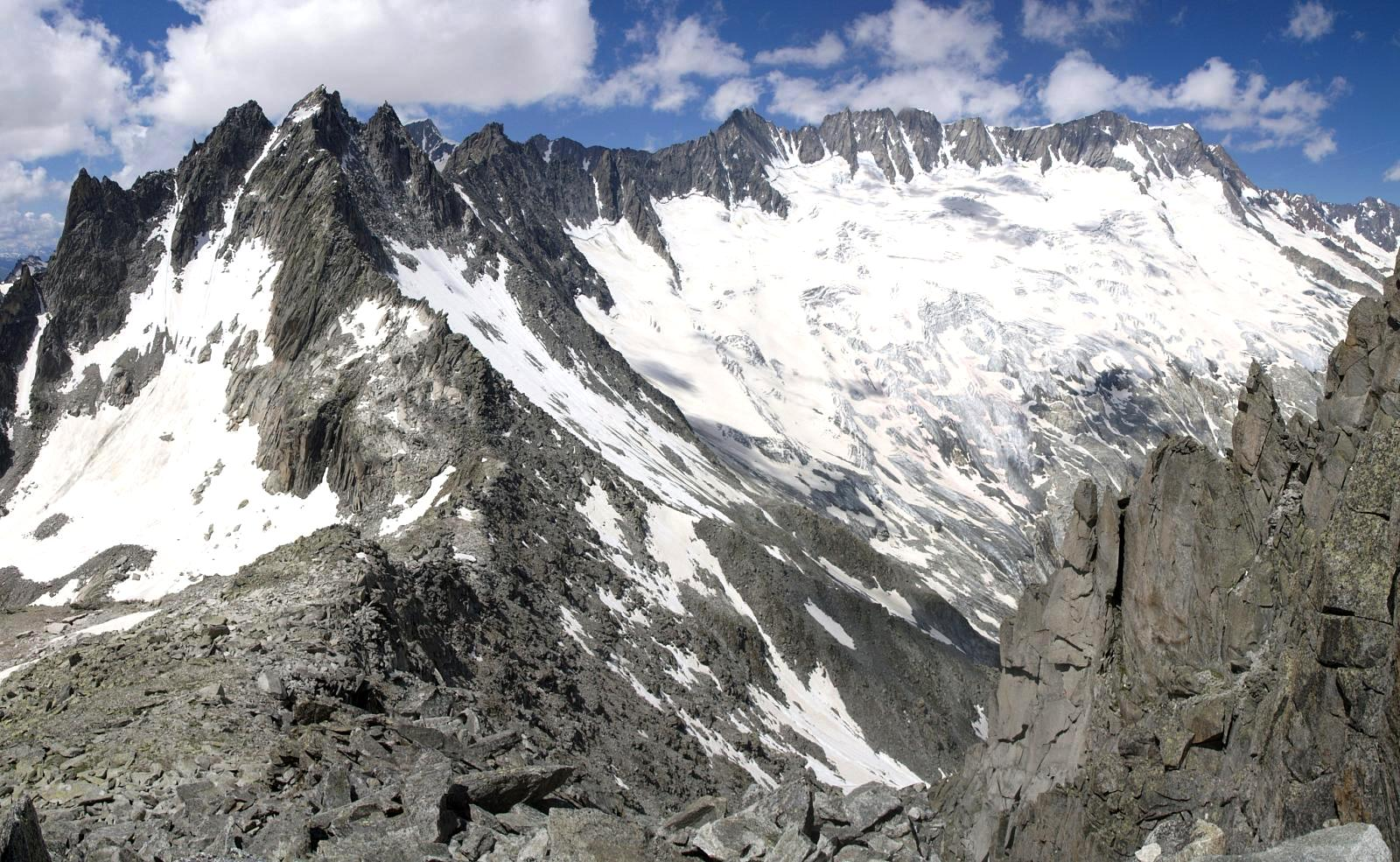
- The long ridge to the summit (right) above the Damma Glacier

Highest point
- Elevation: 3,630 m (11,910 ft)
- Prominence: 1,466 m (4,810 ft)
- Parent peak: Oberaarhorn (line parent)
- Isolation: 21.6 km (13.4 mi)
- Listing: Canton high point Alpine mountains above 3000 m
- Coordinates: 46°38′37.3″N 8°25′16″E

Geography
- Location within Switzerland
- Location: Uri/Valais (massif partially in Bern)
- Country: Switzerland
- Parent range: Urner Alps
- Topo map: Swiss Federal Office of Topography swisstopo

Climbing
- First ascent: 28 July 1864 by Albert Hoffmann-Burkhardt with guides Johann Fischer and Andreas von Weissenfluh
- Easiest route: Glacier tour, F

The Dammastock (3,630 m) is the highest mountain in the Urner Alps in Switzerland and is part of the Winterberg massif. Its summit ridge forms the border between the cantons of Uri and the Valais. It is the highest summit in the canton of Uri. The tripoint between the cantons of Bern, Valais and Uri lies near the Eggstock, north of the Dammastock. Politically, the Dammastock is split between the municipalities of Göschenen (Uri) and Obergoms (Valais).

The massif is almost completely covered by ice, the large Rhone Glacier on the west side, the smaller Damma Glacier on the east side and the Trift Glacier further on the north side.

It was first climbed by Albert Hoffmann-Burkhardt with guides Johann Fischer and Andreas von Weissenfluh on 28 July 1864.

== Huts ==
- Dammastock Hut (2,445 m)
- Hotel Tiefenbach (2,109 m)

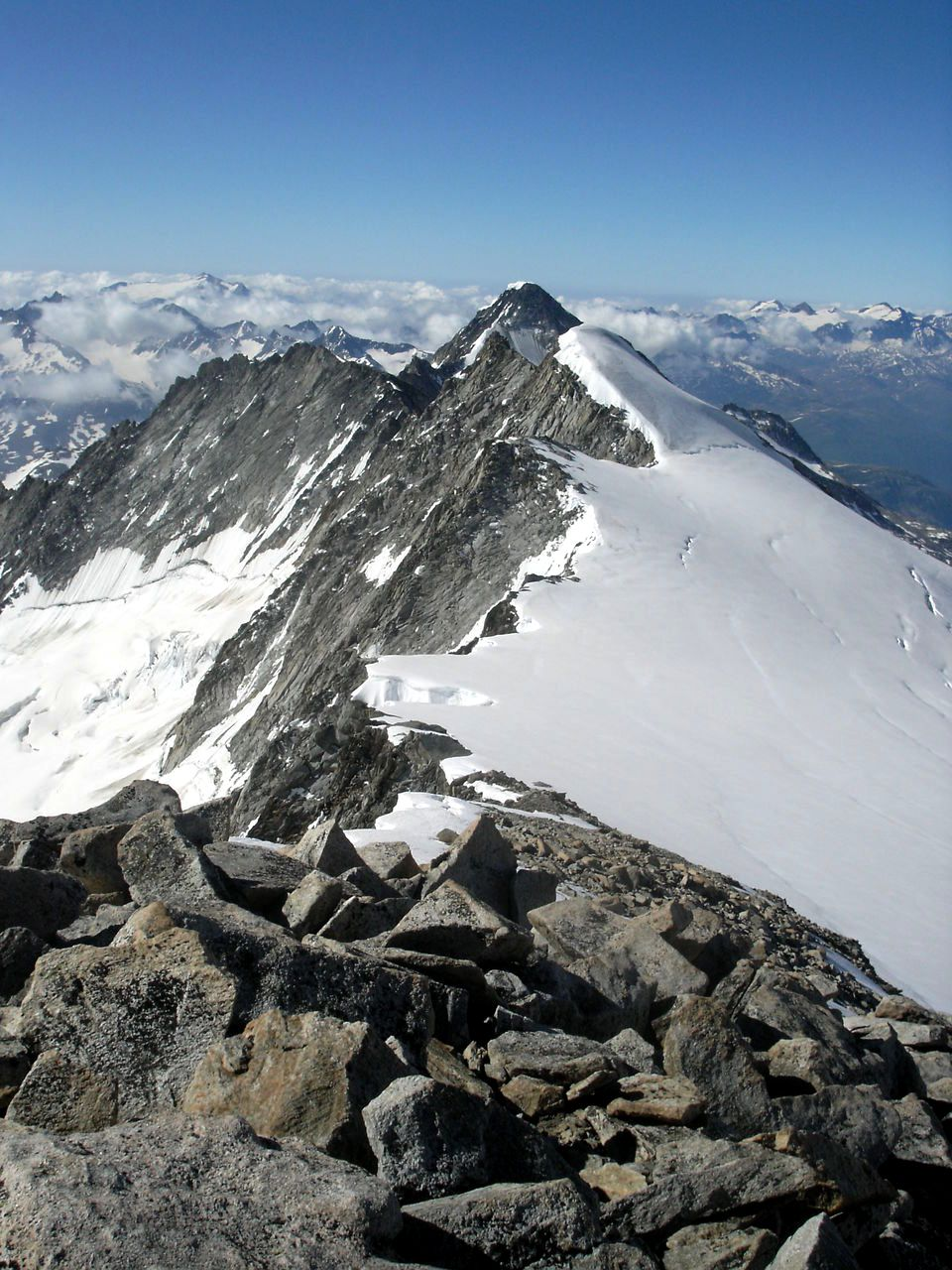
View from the summit toward the Galenstock

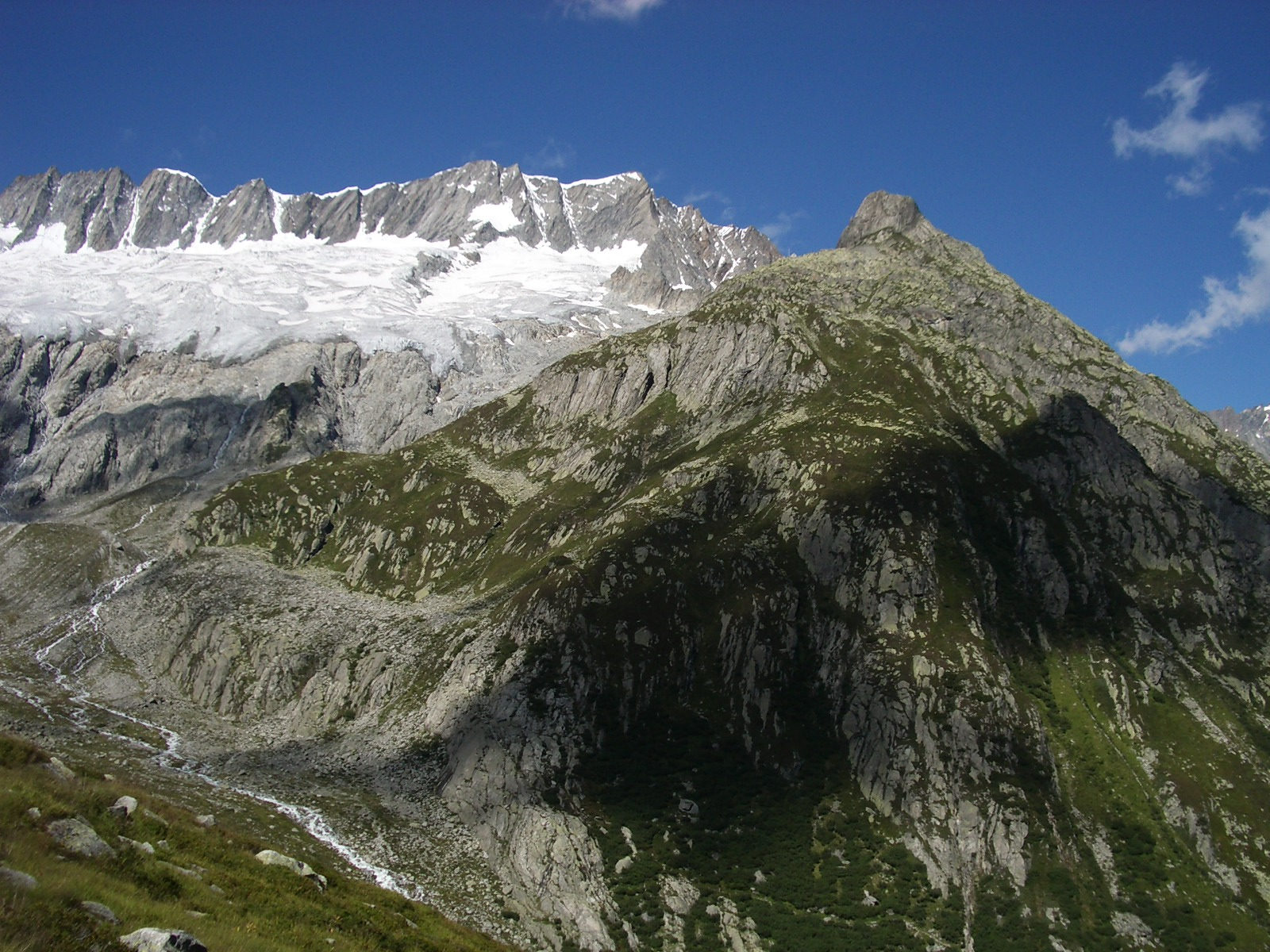
The Dammastock from the Göscheneralp valley, with the Dammastock Hut visible

== See also ==
- List of mountains of Uri
- List of mountains of Switzerland
- List of most isolated mountains of Switzerland
