= List of mountains of Ticino =

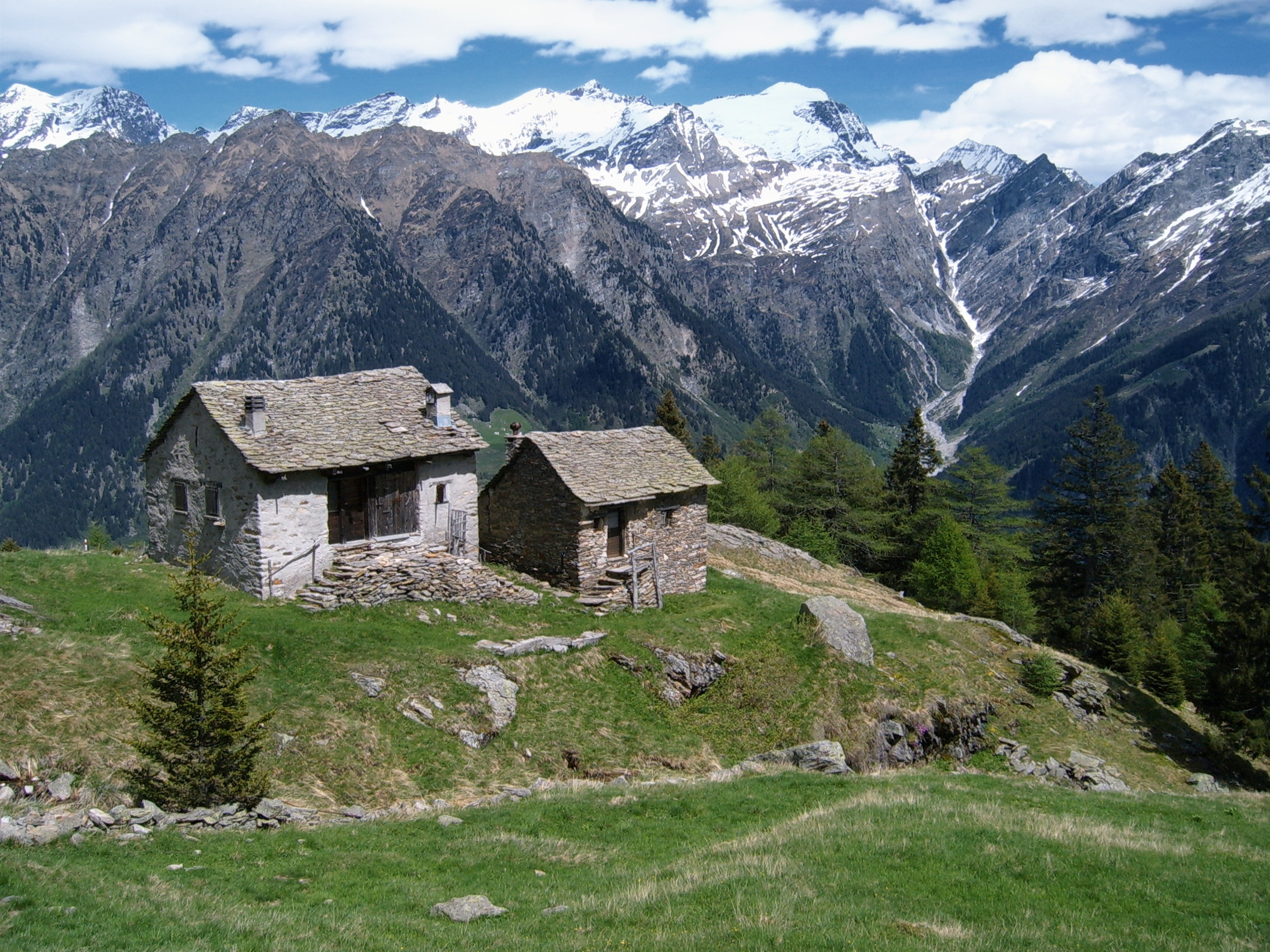
View towards the Rheinwaldhorn

This is a list of mountains of the Swiss canton of Ticino. Ticino is a very mountainous canton and lies almost entirely within the Alps. It is also one of the nine cantons having summits above 3,000 metres. Topographically, the two most important summits of the canton are those of the Rheinwaldhorn (most elevated and isolated) and Monte Tamaro (most prominent).

This list only includes significant summits with a topographic prominence of at least 150 metres (492 ft). There are over 140 such summits in Ticino and they are found in all its 8 districts. All mountain heights and prominences on the list are from the largest-scale maps available.

== List ==
Mountain	Height (m)	Drop (m)	Coordinates	Range	District(s)	First ascent
Rheinwaldhorn/Adula	3402	1337	46°29′37″N 09°02′25″E	Lepontine Alps	Blenio	1789
Basòdino	3272	959	46°24′41″N 08°28′07″E	Lepontine Alps	Vallemaggia	1863
Vogelberg	3218	303	46°28′42″N 09°03′55″E	Lepontine Alps	Blenio	1864
Piz Medel	3211	952	46°37′06″N 08°54′40″E	Lepontine Alps	Blenio	1865
Puntone dei Fraciòn	3202	157	46°28′16″N 09°05′07″E	Lepontine Alps	Blenio	
Pizzo Rotondo	3192	752	46°31′03″N 08°27′58″E	Lepontine Alps	Leventina	1869
Scopi	3190	792	46°34′18″N 08°49′48″E	Lepontine Alps	Blenio	1782
Cima Rossa	3161	236	46°26′38″N 09°05′13″E	Lepontine Alps	Blenio	
Piz Terri	3149	390	46°36′00″N 09°02′03″E	Lepontine Alps	Blenio	1802
Pizzo Campo Tencia	3072	754	46°25′47″N 08°43′34″E	Lepontine Alps	Leventina/Vallemaggia	1867
Chüebodenhorn	3070	316	46°30′29″N 08°27′11″E	Lepontine Alps	Leventina	
Cima dei Cogn	3063	177	46°25′56″N 09°05′19″E	Lepontine Alps	Blenio	
Pizzo Gallina	3061	378	46°29′41″N 08°23′31″E	Lepontine Alps	Leventina	
Piz Blas	3019	312	46°34′38″N 08°43′41″E	Lepontine Alps	Leventina	1871
Piz Rondadura	3016	266	46°34′35″N 08°45′02″E	Lepontine Alps	Leventina	
Pizzo Centrale	2999	451	46°34′41″N 08°36′54″E	Lepontine Alps	Leventina	
Grieshorn	2969	509	46°27′05″N 08°23′35″E	Lepontine Alps	Leventina	
Pizzo Lucendro	2963	350	46°32′20″N 08°31′10″E	Lepontine Alps	Leventina	1871
Marchhorn/Pta del Termine	2962	327	46°26′55″N 08°27′45″E	Lepontine Alps	Vallemaggia	
Torent/Torrone Alto	2952	835	46°20′37″N 09°04′16″E	Lepontine Alps	Riviera	1882
Pizzo del Ramulazz S	2939	324	46°23′48″N 09°05′34″E	Lepontine Alps	Blenio	
Cristallina	2912	344	46°27′53″N 08°32′13″E	Lepontine Alps	Vallemaggia	
Nufenenstock	2866	381	46°28′01″N 08°23′18″E	Lepontine Alps	Leventina	
Poncione di Braga	2864	301	46°26′03″N 08°32′34″E	Lepontine Alps	Vallemaggia	
Wandfluhhorn/Pizzo Biela	2863	452	46°20′41″N 08°27′51″E	Lepontine Alps	Vallemaggia	
Cima di Gana Bianca	2842	410	46°28′17″N 08°59′32″E	Lepontine Alps	Blenio	
Pizzo Castello	2808	385	46°24′56″N 08°33′55″E	Lepontine Alps	Vallemaggia	
Corona di Redorta	2804	481	46°22′32″N 08°43′56″E	Lepontine Alps	Locarno/Vallemaggia	
Pizzo Quadro	2793	470	46°17′55″N 08°25′05″E	Lepontine Alps	Vallemaggia	
Pizzo Marumo	2790	435	46°35′54″N 08°57′34″E	Lepontine Alps	Blenio	
Pizzo del Sole	2773	555	46°31′30″N 08°46′04″E	Lepontine Alps	Blenio/Leventina	
Il Madone (Note: High point between Il Madone and Campanile)	2768	330	46°29′31″N 08°34′01″E	Lepontine Alps	Leventina/Vallemaggia	
Pizzo Massari	2760	424	46°28′33″N 08°41′00″E	Lepontine Alps	Leventina/Vallemaggia	
Madom Gröss	2741	630	46°22′00″N 08°49′52″E	Lepontine Alps	Leventina/Locarno	
Schenadüi	2738	375	46°33′09″N 08°44′55″E	Lepontine Alps	Leventina	
Monte Zucchero	2735	554	46°21′15″N 08°42′51″E	Lepontine Alps	Locarno/Vallemaggia	
Pizzo di Claro	2727	361	46°17′45″N 09°03′20″E	Lepontine Alps	Riviera	
Pizzo Cramalina	2322	297	46°15′19.3″N 08°37′25.8″E	Lepontine Alps	Ticino	
Pizzo dell'Alpe Gelato	2613	357	46°14′59″N 08°26′39″E	Lepontine Alps	Vallemaggia	
Cima Bianca	2612	309	46°23′16″N 08°48′45″E	Lepontine Alps	Blenio	
Rosso di Ribia	2547	569	46°15′40″N 08°31′47″E	Lepontine Alps	Locarno/Vallemaggia	
Cima di Bri	2520	313	46°18′19″N 08°53′03″E	Lepontine Alps	Leventina/Locarno	
Cima di Pinadee	2486	455	46°30′48″N 08°58′37″E	Lepontine Alps	Blenio	
Pizzo Erra	2416	300	46°26′28″N 08°53′27″E	Lepontine Alps	Blenio/Leventina	
Poncione Piancascia	2360	325	46°17′57″N 08°43′58″E	Lepontine Alps	Locarno/Vallemaggia	
Pizzo Bombögn	2331	268	46°18′16″N 08°29′50″E	Lepontine Alps	Vallemaggia	
Camoghè	2228	283	46°08′06″N 09°03′51″E	Lugano Prealps	Bellinzona/Lugano	
Sosto	2221	524	46°32′54″N 08°57′07″E	Lepontine Alps	Blenio	
Gridone/Monte Limidario	2188	1218	46°07′24″N 08°38′53″E	Lepontine Alps	Locarno	
Pizzo Ruscada	2004	330	46°10′39″N 08°35′34″E	Lepontine Alps	Locarno	
Monte Tamaro	1961	1408	46°06′14″N 08°51′58″E	Lugano Prealps	Locarno/Lugano	
Cima di Fojorina	1810	305	46°03′46″N 09°04′22″E	Lugano Prealps	Lugano	
Monte Gambarogno	1734	339	46°06′44″N 08°49′49″E	Lugano Prealps	Locarno	
Monte Generoso	1701	1321	45°55′53″N 09°01′12″E	Lugano Prealps	Lugano	
Monte Lema	1621	902	45°58′37″N 08°56′50″E	Lugano Prealps	Lugano	
Monte Salmone	1560	484	46°12′34″N 08°42′26″E	Lepontine Alps	Locarno/Vallemaggia	
Monte Boglia	1516	342	46°01′47″N 09°00′27″E	Lugano Prealps	Lugano	
Monte San Giorgio	1097	758	45°54′49″N 08°56′59″E	Lugano Prealps	Lugano/Mendrisio	
Poncione d'Arzo	1015	345	45°53′32″N 08°55′27″E	Lugano Prealps	Mendrisio	
Monte San Salvatore	912	602	45°58′37″N 08°56′50″E	Lugano Prealps	Lugano	

== See also ==
- List of mountains of Switzerland
- Swiss Alps
