= Pizzo Bombögn =

Mountain in Switzerland

- Location within Switzerland

Highest point
- Elevation: 2,331 m (7,648 ft)
- Prominence: 268 m (879 ft)
- Listing: List of mountains of Ticino
- Coordinates: 46°18′16.7″N 8°29′50.4″E

Geography
- Location: Ticino, Switzerland
- Parent range: Lepontine Alps

Pizzo Bombögn is a mountain of the Swiss Lepontine Alps, located between Bosco/Gurin and Campo (Vallemaggia) in the canton of Ticino. It lies on the chain east of Pizzo Quadro.
