= Madone di Càmedo =

Mountain in Switzerland

- Location within Switzerland

Highest point
- Elevation: 2,446 m (8,025 ft)
- Prominence: 71 m (233 ft)
- Parent peak: Madonino
- Coordinates: 46°19′50.3″N 8°33′49.1″E

Geography
- Location: Ticino, Switzerland
- Parent range: Lepontine Alps

The Madone di Càmedo is a mountain of the Swiss Lepontine Alps, overlooking Cevio in the canton of Ticino.
