= Pizzo Castello =

Mountain in Switzerland

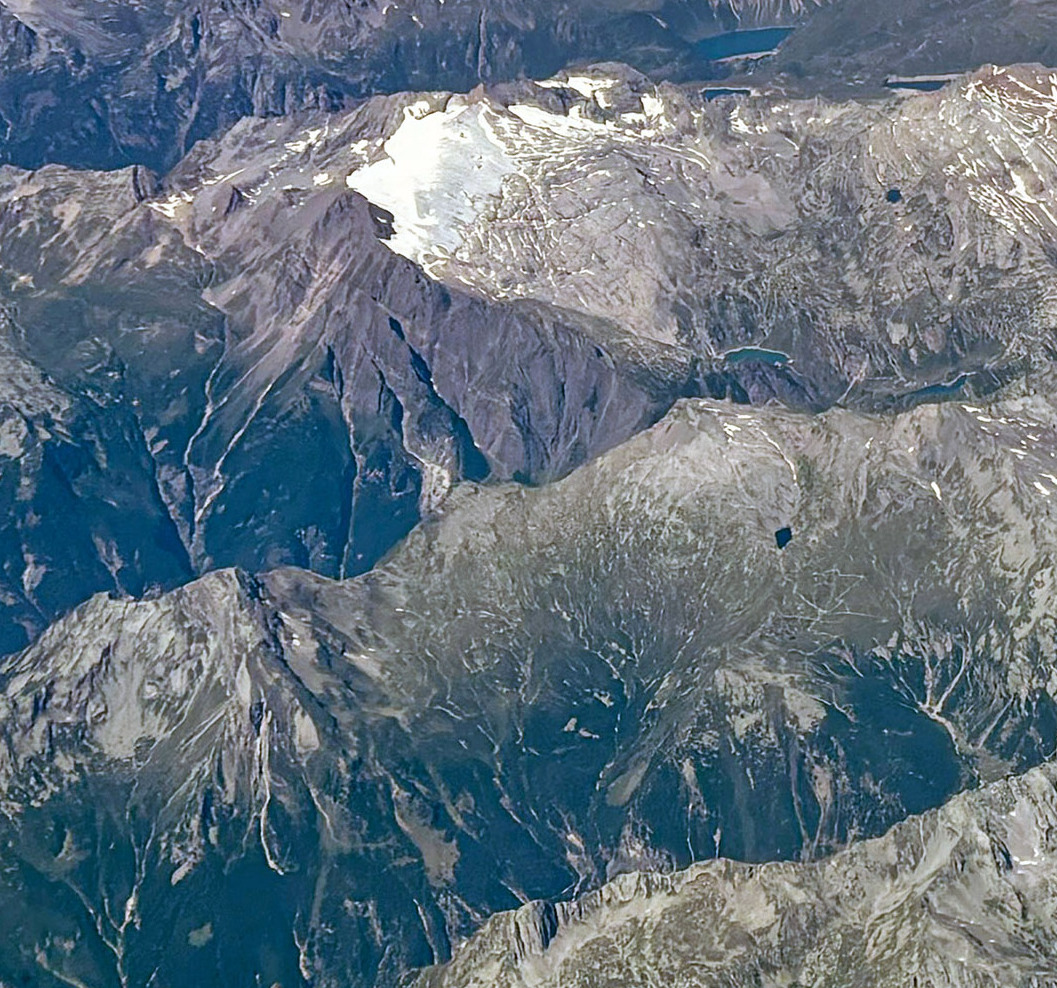
- Basòdino, Poncione di Braga and Pizzo Castello (left)

Highest point
- Elevation: 2,808 m (9,213 ft)
- Prominence: 385 m (1,263 ft)
- Parent peak: Basòdino
- Coordinates: 46°24′56.3″N 8°33′54.7″E

Geography
- Location within Switzerland
- Location: Ticino, Switzerland
- Parent range: Lepontine Alps

Pizzo Castello is a mountain of the Lepontine Alps, located in the canton of Ticino, Switzerland. It is situated in the upper Valle Maggia, between the Val Bavona (west) and Valle di Peccia (east).
