= Gridone =

Mountain in Switzerland

Gridone - Ghiridone
- Monte Limidario
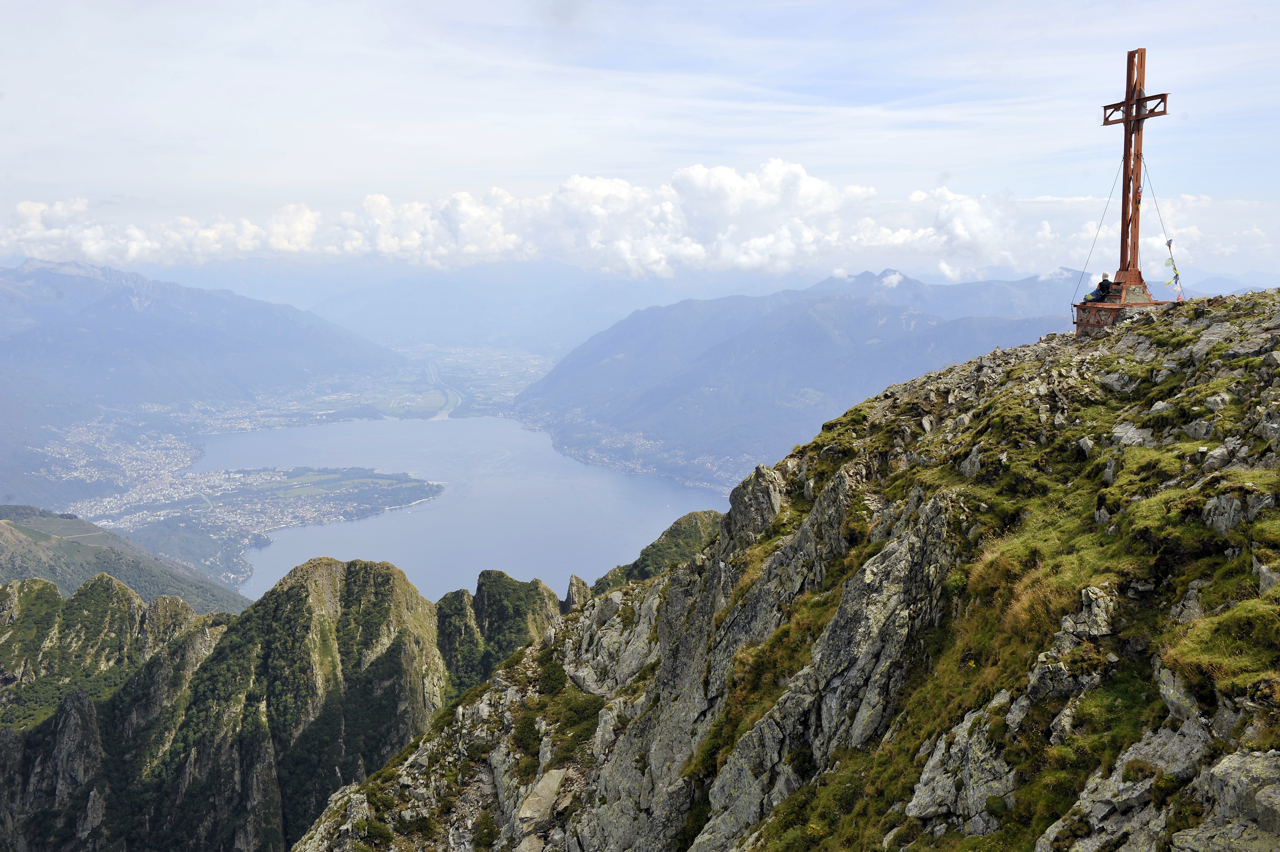
- View over Ascona, Locarno, Ticino and Magadino

Highest point
- Elevation: 2,188 m (7,178 ft)
- Prominence: 1,218 m (3,996 ft)
- Parent peak: Monte Togano
- Isolation: 14.4 km (8.9 mi)
- Coordinates: 46°7′24.1″N 8°38′52.9″E

Geography
- Location within Alps
- Location: Ticino, Switzerland; Piedmont, Italy
- Parent range: Lepontine Alps

The Gridone, Ghiridone or Monte Limidario is a mountain of the Lepontine Alps, overlooking Lake Maggiore near Brissago. At 2,188 metres above sea level, its summit straddles the border between Italy and Switzerland.

The summit can be easily reached from both sides, although it is nearly 2,000 metres above Lake Maggiore.

== See also ==
- List of mountains of Ticino
- List of most isolated mountains of Switzerland
