= Il Madone =

Mountain in Switzerland

- Location within Switzerland

Highest point
- Elevation: 2,756 m (9,042 ft)
- Prominence: 318 m (1,043 ft)
- Parent peak: Basòdino
- Coordinates: 46°29′30.5″N 8°33′32.6″E

Geography
- Location: Ticino, Switzerland
- Parent range: Lepontine Alps

Il Madone is a mountain of the Lepontine Alps, located in the Swiss canton of Ticino. On its southern side lies Lago del Narèt.
