= Corona di Redorta =

Mountain in Switzerland

- Location within Switzerland

Highest point
- Elevation: 2,804 m (9,199 ft)
- Prominence: 481 m (1,578 ft)
- Parent peak: Pizzo Campo Tencia
- Listing: Alpine mountains 2500-2999 m
- Coordinates: 46°22′32.1″N 8°43′55.2″E

Geography
- Location: Ticino, Switzerland
- Parent range: Lepontine Alps

The Corona di Redorta is a mountain of the Swiss Lepontine Alps, located between Lavizzara and Sonogno in the canton of Ticino. Culminating at a height of 2,804 metres above sea level, the Corona di Redorta is the second highest summit of the Valle Verzasca, after Pizzo Barone.
