= Pizzo Massari =

Mountain in Switzerland

- Location within Switzerland

Highest point
- Elevation: 2,760 m (9,060 ft)
- Prominence: 424 m (1,391 ft)
- Parent peak: Basòdino
- Coordinates: 46°28′33.6″N 8°40′59.7″E

Geography
- Location: Ticino, Switzerland
- Parent range: Lepontine Alps

Pizzo Massari is a mountain of the Lepontine Alps, overlooking Ambrì in the canton of Ticino. It is located on the chain separating the Val Lavizzara (upper Valle Maggia) from the Leventina. The lakes Lago del Sambuco and Lago Tremorgio lie on its western and eastern side respectively.
