= Madonino =

Mountain in Switzerland

- Location within Switzerland Location within Alps

Highest point
- Elevation: 2,483 m (8,146 ft)
- Prominence: 167 m (548 ft)
- Parent peak: Basòdino
- Coordinates: 46°20′01″N 8°33′17″E

Geography
- Location: Ticino, Switzerland
- Parent range: Lepontine Alps

The Madonino is a mountain of the Swiss Lepontine Alps, located west of Cevio in the canton of Ticino. It lies between the valleys of Bavona and Bosco/Gurin.
