= Poncione di Braga =

Mountain in Switzerland

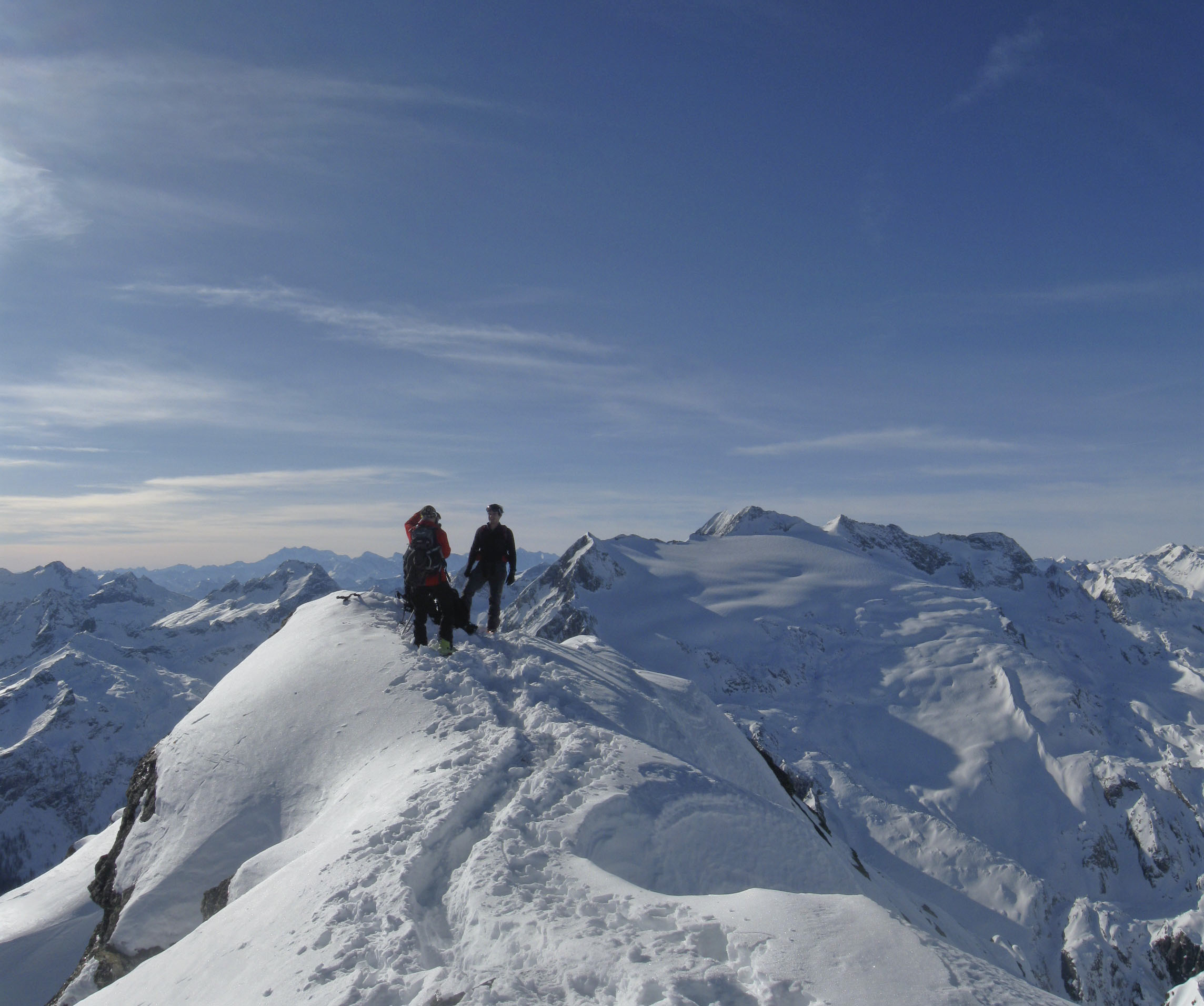
- View from the top towards the Basòdino

Highest point
- Elevation: 2,864 m (9,396 ft)
- Prominence: 301 m (988 ft)
- Parent peak: Basòdino
- Coordinates: 46°26′04.4″N 8°32′35″E

Geography
- Location within Switzerland
- Location: Ticino, Switzerland
- Parent range: Lepontine Alps

Poncione di Braga is a mountain of the Lepontine Alps, located in the canton of Ticino, Switzerland. It is located in the upper Valle Maggia, south of the Cristallina.
