= Pizzo Campo Tencia =

Mountain in Switzerland

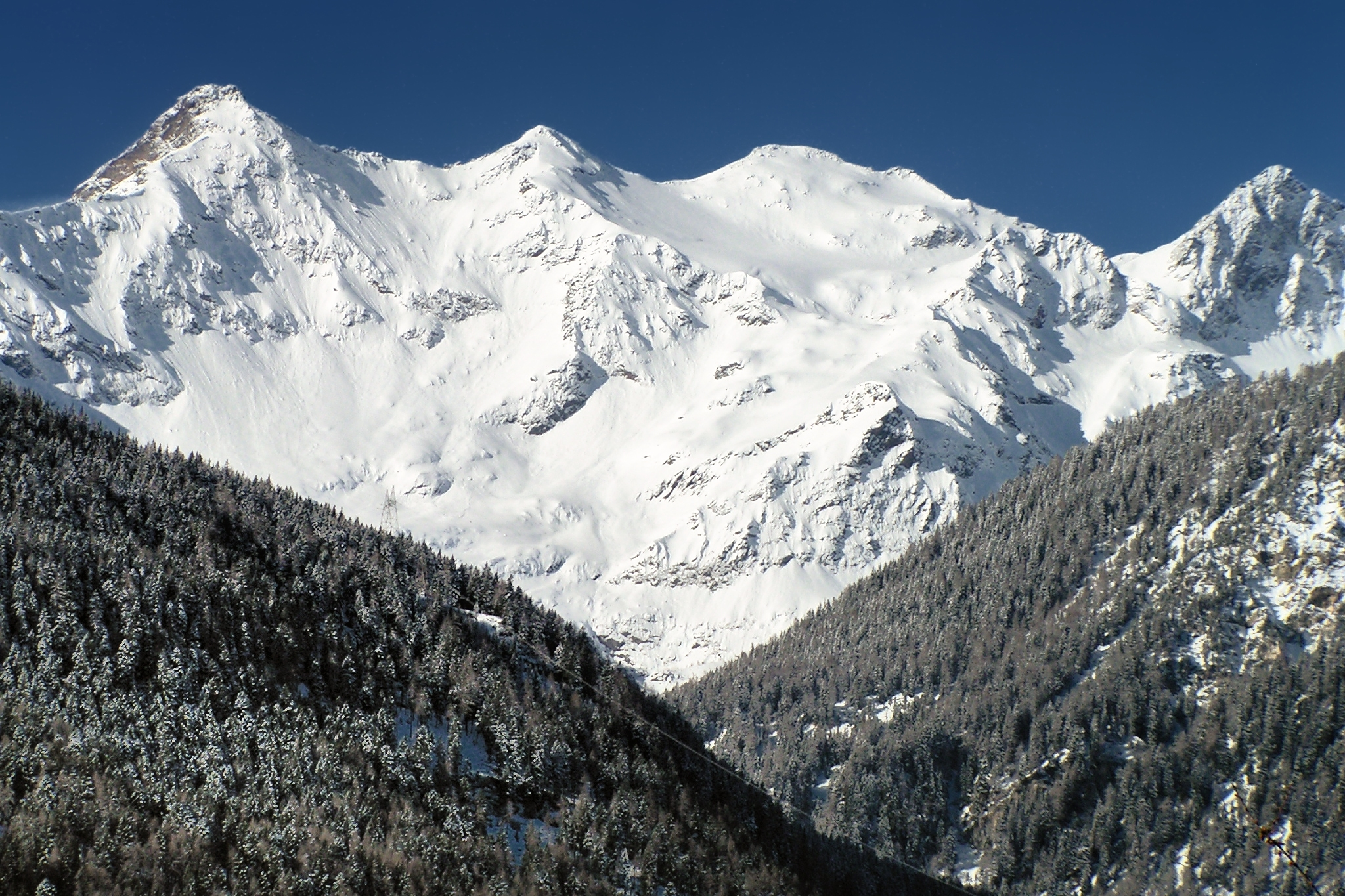

Highest point
- Elevation: 3,072 m (10,079 ft)
- Prominence: 754 m (2,474 ft)
- Parent peak: Basòdino
- Isolation: 17.5 km (10.9 mi)
- Listing: Alpine mountains above 3000 m
- Coordinates: 46°25′46.8″N 8°43′33.8″E

Geography
- Location within Switzerland
- Location: Ticino, Switzerland
- Parent range: Lepontine Alps

Pizzo Campo Tencia (or Campo Tencia) is a mountain in the Lepontine Alps, which lies in the canton of Ticino, Switzerland. Pizzo Campo Tencia is the highest peak located entirely inside the canton.

The mountain lies south of Lago di Morghirolo, between the Valle Leventina and Valle Maggia.

== See also ==
- List of mountains of Ticino
- List of most isolated mountains of Switzerland
