= Monte Salmone =

Mountain in Switzerland

- Location within Switzerland

Highest point
- Elevation: 1,560 m (5,120 ft)
- Prominence: 484 m (1,588 ft)
- Parent peak: Rosso di Ribia
- Coordinates: 46°12′34″N 8°42′26″E

Geography
- Location: Ticino, Switzerland
- Parent range: Lepontine Alps

Monte Salmone is a mountain of the Lepontine Alps, located north of Cavigliano in the canton of Ticino. It lies on the range between the valleys of Onsernone and Maggia.
