= Cima di Pinadee =

Mountain in Switzerland

- Location within Switzerland

Highest point
- Elevation: 2,486 m (8,156 ft)
- Prominence: 455 m (1,493 ft)
- Parent peak: Rheinwaldhorn
- Coordinates: 46°30′47.6″N 8°58′36.7″E

Geography
- Location: Ticino, Switzerland
- Parent range: Lepontine Alps

Cima di Pinadee is a mountain of the Swiss Lepontine Alps, located east of Olivone in the canton of Ticino. It lies between the Valle di Blenio and the Val di Carassino, north of the Passo di Piotta.
