= Pizzo Quadro =

Mountain in Switzerland

- Location within Alps Location within Switzerland Location within Piedmont

Highest point
- Elevation: 2,793 m (9,163 ft)
- Prominence: 470 m (1,540 ft)
- Parent peak: Basòdino
- Coordinates: 46°17′54″N 8°25′40″E

Geography
- Location: Ticino, Switzerland; Piedmont, Italy
- Parent range: Lepontine Alps

Pizzo Quadro is a mountain of the Lepontine Alps on the Swiss-Italian border. With an elevation of 2,793 metres above sea level, it is the highest summit of the range lying south of the Wandfluhhorn and the Guriner Furggu (2,323 m). Pizzo Quadro is located between the localities of San Rocco di Prèmia (Piedmont) and Campo (Ticino).

== SOIUSA classification ==
According to the SOIUSA (International Standardized Mountain Subdivision of the Alps) the mountain can be classified in the following way:

- main part = Western Alps
- major sector = North Western Alps
- section = Lepontine Alps
- subsection = Ticino and verbano Alps
- supergroup = Catena Basodino-Cristallina-Biela
- group = Catena Fiorera-Biela-Corona di Groppo
- subgroup = Gruppo Corona del Groppo-Pizzo Quadro
- code = I/B-10.II-A.3.c
