= Ticinese franco =

franco ticinese (Italian)
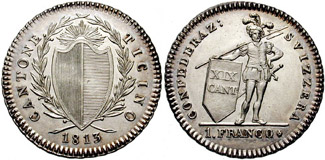
- One franco coin (1813)

Unit
- Plural: franchi

Denominations
- Subunit
- 1/20: soldo
- 1/240: denaro
- Plural
- soldo: soldi
- denaro: denari
- Coins
- Freq. used: 3 and 6 denari 3 soldi 1/4, 1/2, 1, 2 and 4 franchi

Demographics
- User(s): (Switzerland) Swiss canton of Ticino

Valuation
- Pegged by: Swiss franc (at par 1813, 1 franco = 1 1/2 franc 1850)
- This infobox shows the latest status before this currency was rendered obsolete.

The Ticinese franco (plural: franchi) was the currency of the Swiss canton of Ticino between 1813 and 1850. It was subdivided into 20 soldi (singular: soldo), each of 12 denari (singular denaro), similar to the British pounds, shillings and pence system. It was worth 1/4th the French silver écu or 6.67 g fine silver.

The frank was the currency of the Helvetian Republic from its establishment in 1798, but ceased issuing coins in 1803. Ticino introduced the franco, equivalent to the frank, in 1813 and issued coins until 1845. In 1850, the Swiss franc was introduced across the whole country, to the value of 1 Ticino franco = 1.4597 Swiss francs.

Copper coins were issued for the denominations of 3 and 6 denari, with bullion 3 soldi and silver 1/4, 1/2, 1, 2 and 4 franchi.
