= Basòdino =

Mountain in Switzerland

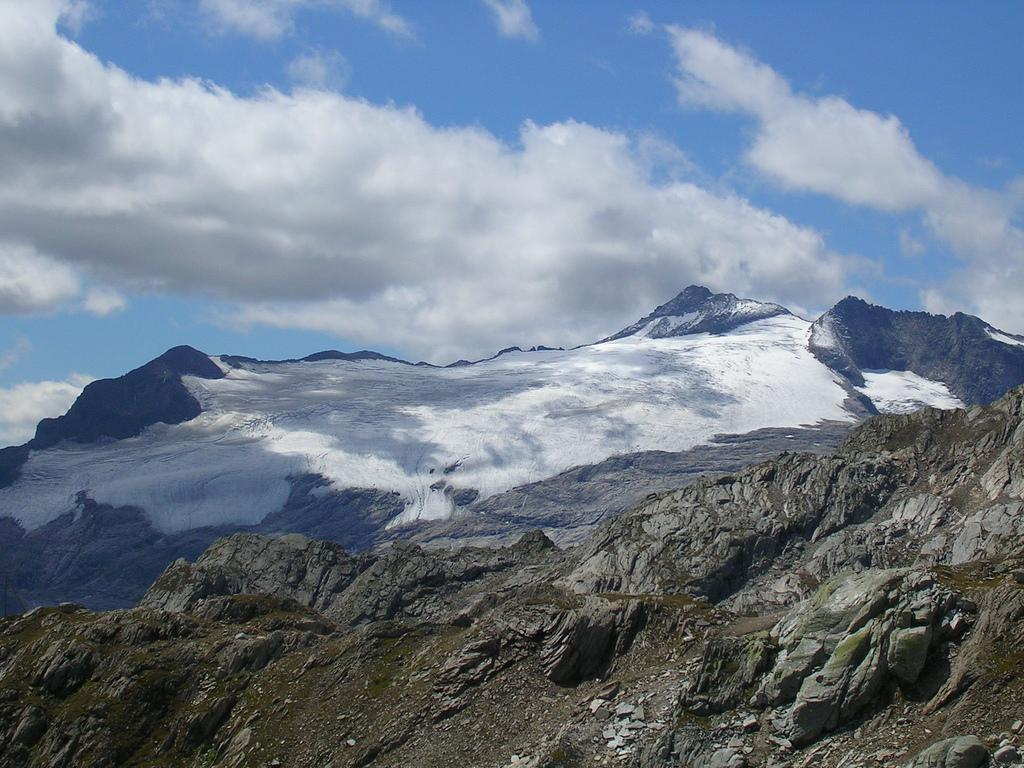
- Basodino Glacier

Highest point
- Elevation: 3,273 m (10,738 ft)
- Prominence: 960 m (3,150 ft)
- Parent peak: Dammastock
- Isolation: 10.9 km (6.8 mi)
- Listing: Alpine mountains above 3000 m
- Coordinates: 46°24′41.8″N 8°28′6.5″E

Geography
- Location within Alps
- Location: Ticino, Switzerland; Piedmont, Italy
- Parent range: Lepontine Alps

The Basòdino is a mountain in the Lepontine Alps on the border between Italy and Switzerland. It is the second highest peak in the canton of Ticino, after the Rheinwaldhorn.

On its summit is located a geodetic point of IGM named 05A901 Monte Basodino.

== SOIUSA classification ==
According to SOIUSA (International Standardized Mountain Subdivision of the Alps) the mountain is classified in the following way:

- main part = Western Alps
- major sector = North-Western Alps
- section = Lepontine Alps
- subsection = South-western Lepontine Alps
- supergroup = Catena Basodino-Cristallina-Biela
- group = Gruppo del Basodino
- subgroup = Gruppo del Basodino sensu stricto,
- code = I/B-10.II-A.1.b

== See also ==
- List of mountains of Ticino
- List of mountains of Switzerland
- List of most isolated mountains of Switzerland
