= Ticino =

Canton of Switzerland

- Canton
- Republic and Canton of Ticino; Repubblica e Cantone Ticino (Italian)
- Flag Coat of arms Brandmark

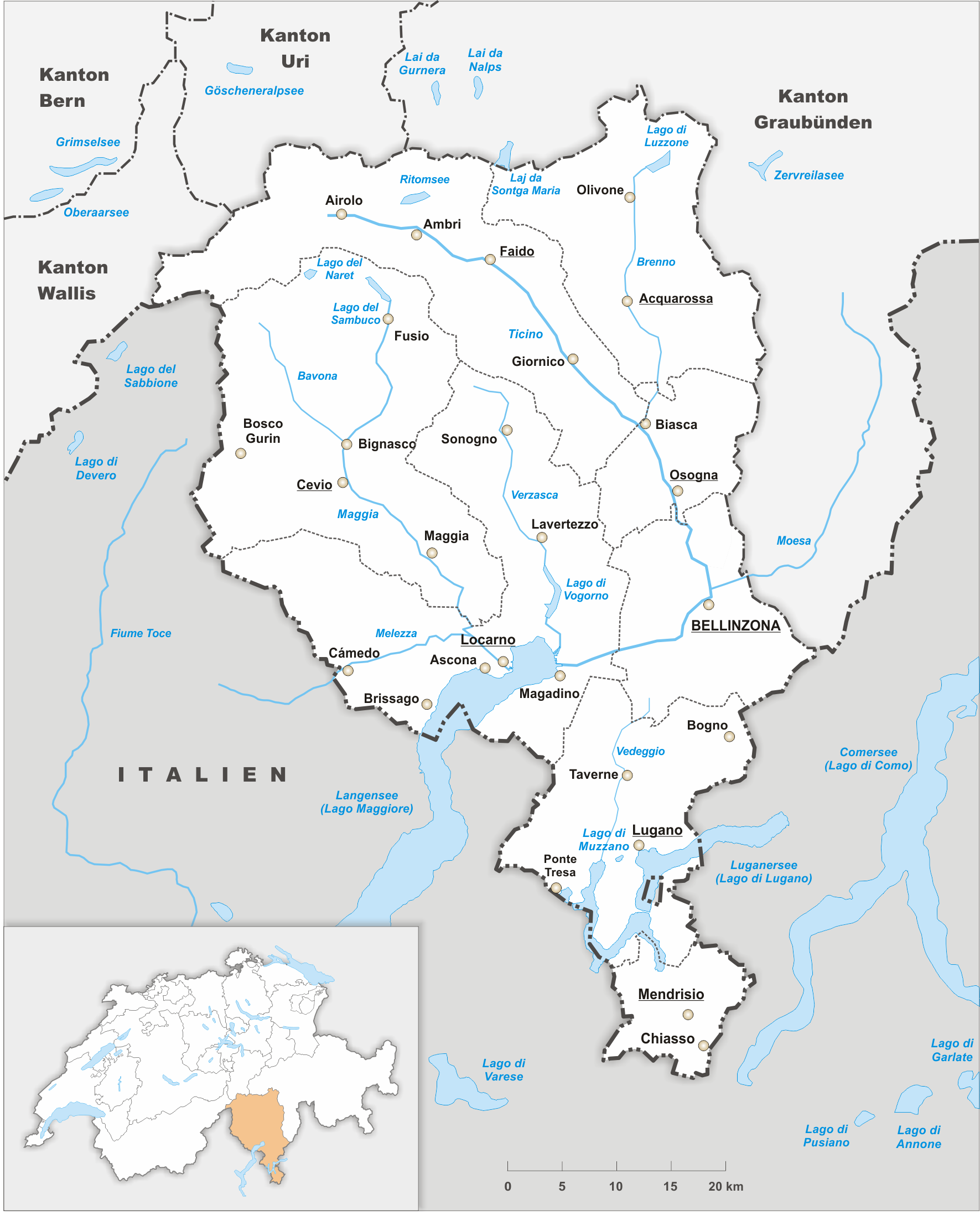
- Location in Switzerland Map of Ticino
- Coordinates: 46°19′N 8°49′E
- Country: Switzerland
- Capital: Bellinzona
- Largest city: Lugano
- Subdivisions: 100 municipalities, 8 districts

Government
  - President: Christian Vitta
  - Executive: Council of State (5)
  - Legislative: Grand Council (90)

Area
  - Total: 2,812.21 km^{2} (1,085.80 sq mi)

Population (December 2020)
  - Total: 350,986
  - Density: 124.808/km^{2} (323.251/sq mi)

GDP
  - Total: CHF 33.181 billion (2021)
  - Per capita: CHF 94,377 (2021)
- ISO 3166 code: CH-TI
- Highest point: 3,402 m (11,161 ft): Adula (Rheinwaldhorn)
- Lowest point: 195 m (640 ft): Lake Maggiore
- Joined: 1803
- Languages: Italian
- HDI: 0.964 (2022) very high · 3rd of 7
- Website: www.ti.ch

Ticino (/tɪˈtʃiːnoʊ/ tih-CHEE-noh), sometimes Tessin (/tɛˈsiːn, tɛˈsæ̃/ tess-EEN), officially the Republic and Canton of Ticino, (Note: Italian: Repubblica e Cantone Ticino, informally Canton Ticino [kanˈton tiˈtʃiːno]; Lombard: Cantón Tesin [kaŋˈtoŋ teˈziŋ]; German: Kanton Tessin [ˈkantɔn tɛˈsiːn]; French: Canton du Tessin [kɑ̃tɔ̃ dy tɛsɛ̃]; Romansh: Chantun dal Tessin [tɕɐnˈtun dɐl teˈsin].) is one of the 26 cantons forming the Swiss Confederation. It is composed of eight districts and its capital city is Bellinzona. It is also traditionally divided into the Sopraceneri and the Sottoceneri, respectively north and south of Monte Ceneri.

Ticino is the southernmost canton of Switzerland. It is one of the three large southern Alpine cantons, along with Valais and the Grisons. However, unlike all other cantons, it lies almost entirely south of the Alps and has no natural access to the Swiss Plateau. Through the main crest of the Gotthard Massif and adjacent mountain ranges, it borders the canton of Valais to the northwest, the canton of Uri to the north and the canton of Grisons to the northeast; the latter canton being also the only one to share some borders with Ticino at the level of the plains. The canton shares international borders with Italy as well, including a small Italian enclave.

Named after the Ticino, its longest river, it is the only canton where Italian is the sole official language and represents the bulk of the Italian-speaking area of Switzerland along with the southern parts of the Grisons. In 2020, Ticino had a population of 350,986. The largest city is Lugano, and the two other notable centres are Bellinzona and Locarno. While the geography of the Sopraceneri region is marked by the High Alps and Lake Maggiore, that of the Sottoceneri is marked by the Alpine foothills and Lake Lugano. The canton, which has become one of the major tourist destinations of Switzerland, distinguishes itself from the rest of the country by its warm climate, and its culture and gastronomy.

The land now occupied by the canton was annexed from Italian cities in the 15th century by various Swiss forces in the last transalpine campaigns of the Old Swiss Confederacy. In the Helvetic Republic, established in 1798, it was divided between the two new cantons of Bellinzona and Lugano. The Act of Mediation in 1803 saw these two cantons combine to form the modern canton of Ticino. Because of its unusual position, the canton relies on important infrastructure for connection with the rest of the country. The first major north–south railway link across the Alps, the Gotthard Railway, opened in 1882. In 2016, the Gotthard Base Tunnel was inaugurated, which finally provided a fully flat route through the Alps.

The GDP per capita of Ticino was 83,450 Swiss francs in 2020, above the Swiss average of 80,418 Swiss francs in the same period. It is one of the wealthiest areas in Europe. Ticino had the second highest life expectancy (85.2 years) in Europe in 2018. The Human Development Index of 0.961 in 2021 was one of the highest found anywhere in the world.

== Etymology ==
The name Ticino was chosen for the newly established canton in 1803, after the river Ticino which flows through it from the Novena Pass to Lake Maggiore.

Known as Ticinus in Roman times, the river appears on the Tabula Peutingeriana as Ticenum. Johann Kaspar Zeuss attributed Celtic origins to the name, tracing it to the Celtic tek, itself from an Indo-European root tak, meaning "melting, flowing".

The official name of the canton is Republic and Canton of Ticino (Italian: Repubblica e Cantone Ticino), and the two-letter code is TI. It is one of the four cantons of Switzerland officially referred to as "republics", along with Geneva, Neuchâtel and Jura.

== History ==
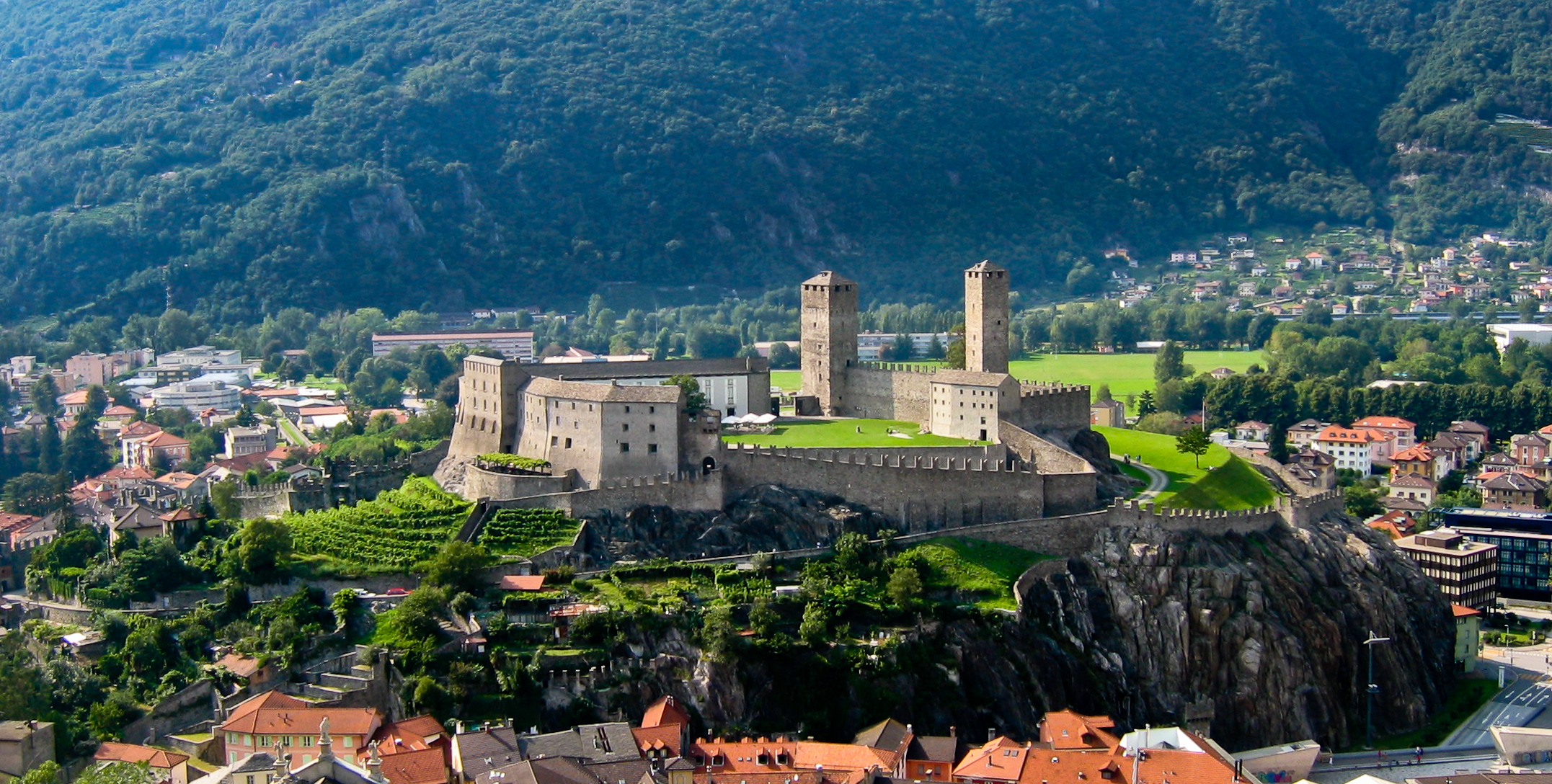
The Castles of Bellinzona, guarding the access to the Gotthard and other Alpine passes since the Roman Era

During the Bronze and Iron Ages, the area of what is today Ticino was settled by the Lepontii, a Celtic tribe. Later, probably around the rule of Augustus, it became part of the Roman Empire. After the fall of the Western Empire, it was ruled by the Ostrogoths, the Lombards and the Franks. Around 1100 it was the centre of a struggle between the free communes of Milan and Como: in the 14th century, it was acquired by the Visconti, Dukes of Milan. In the fifteenth century, the Swiss Confederates conquered the valleys south of the Alps in three separate conquests.

Between 1403 and 1422 some of these lands were already annexed by forces from the canton of Uri, but subsequently lost. Uri conquered the Leventina Valley in 1440. In a second conquest Uri, Schwyz and Nidwalden gained the town of Bellinzona and the Riviera in 1500. Some of the land and Bellinzona itself were previously annexed by Uri in 1419 but lost again in 1422. The third conquest was fought by troops from the entire Confederation (at that time constituted by 12 cantons). In 1512 Locarno, the Maggia Valley, Lugano and Mendrisio were annexed. Subsequently, the upper valley of the river Ticino, from the St. Gotthard to the town of Biasca (Leventina Valley) was part of Uri. The remaining territory (Baliaggi Ultramontani, Ennetbergische Vogteien, the Bailiwicks Beyond the Mountains) was administered by the Twelve Cantons. These districts were governed by bailiffs holding office for two years and purchasing it from the members of the League.

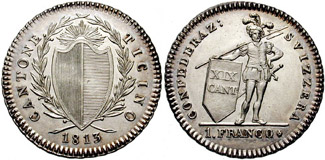
Ticinese franco, currency of Ticino until the introduction of the Swiss franc in 1850.

The lands of the canton of Ticino are the last lands to be conquered by the Swiss Confederation. The Confederation gave up any further conquests after their defeat at the battle of Marignano in 1515 by Francis I of France. The Valle Leventina revolted unsuccessfully against Uri in 1755. In February 1798 an attempt of annexation by the Cisalpine Republic was repelled by a volunteer militia in Lugano. Between 1798 and 1803, during the Helvetic Republic, two cantons were created (Bellinzona and Lugano) but in 1803 the two were unified to form the canton of Ticino that joined the Swiss Confederation as a full member in the same year under the Act of Mediation. During the Napoleonic Wars, many Ticinesi (as was the case for other Swiss) served in Swiss military units allied with the French. The canton minted its own currency, the Ticinese franco, between 1813 and 1850, when it began the use of the Swiss franc.

As a particularly poor region, Ticino was a land of emigration. Notable examples include the chocolatiers (cioccolatieri) of the Val Blenio, who migrated throughout Europe (see History of Swiss Chocolate).

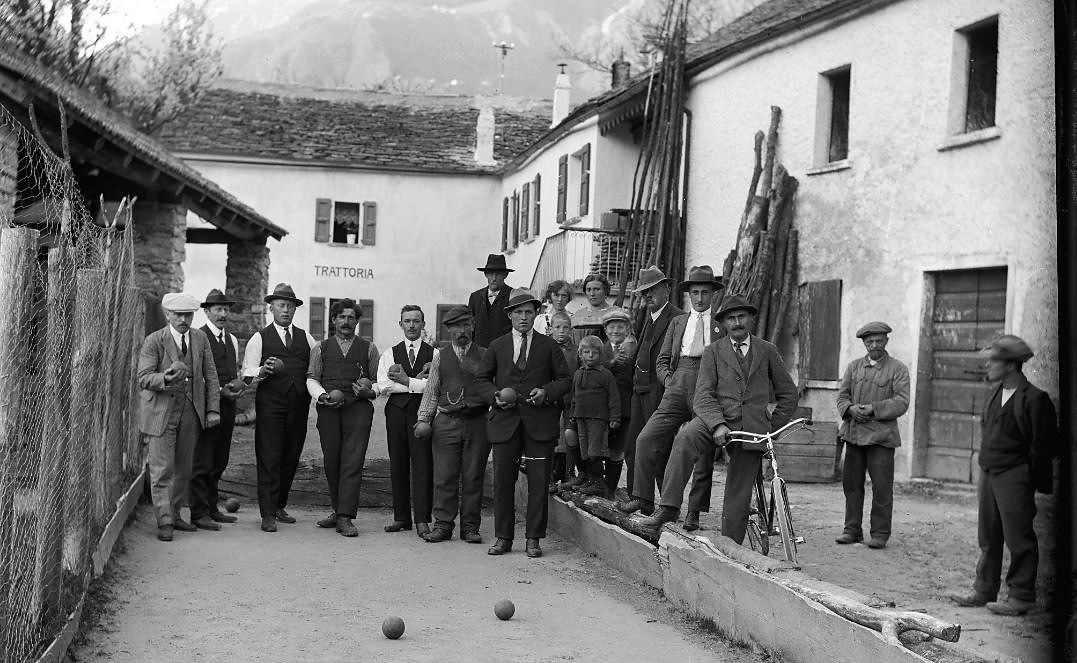
Men playing Bocce in Torre (early 20th century)

Until 1878 the three largest cities, Bellinzona, Lugano and Locarno, alternated as capital of the canton. In 1878, however, Bellinzona became the only and permanent capital. The 1870–1891 period saw a surge of political turbulence in Ticino, and the authorities needed the assistance of the federal government to restore order in several instances, in 1870, 1876, 1889 and 1890–1891.

The current cantonal constitution dates from 1997. The previous constitution, heavily modified, was codified in 1830, nearly 20 years before the constitution of the Swiss Confederation.

== Geography ==
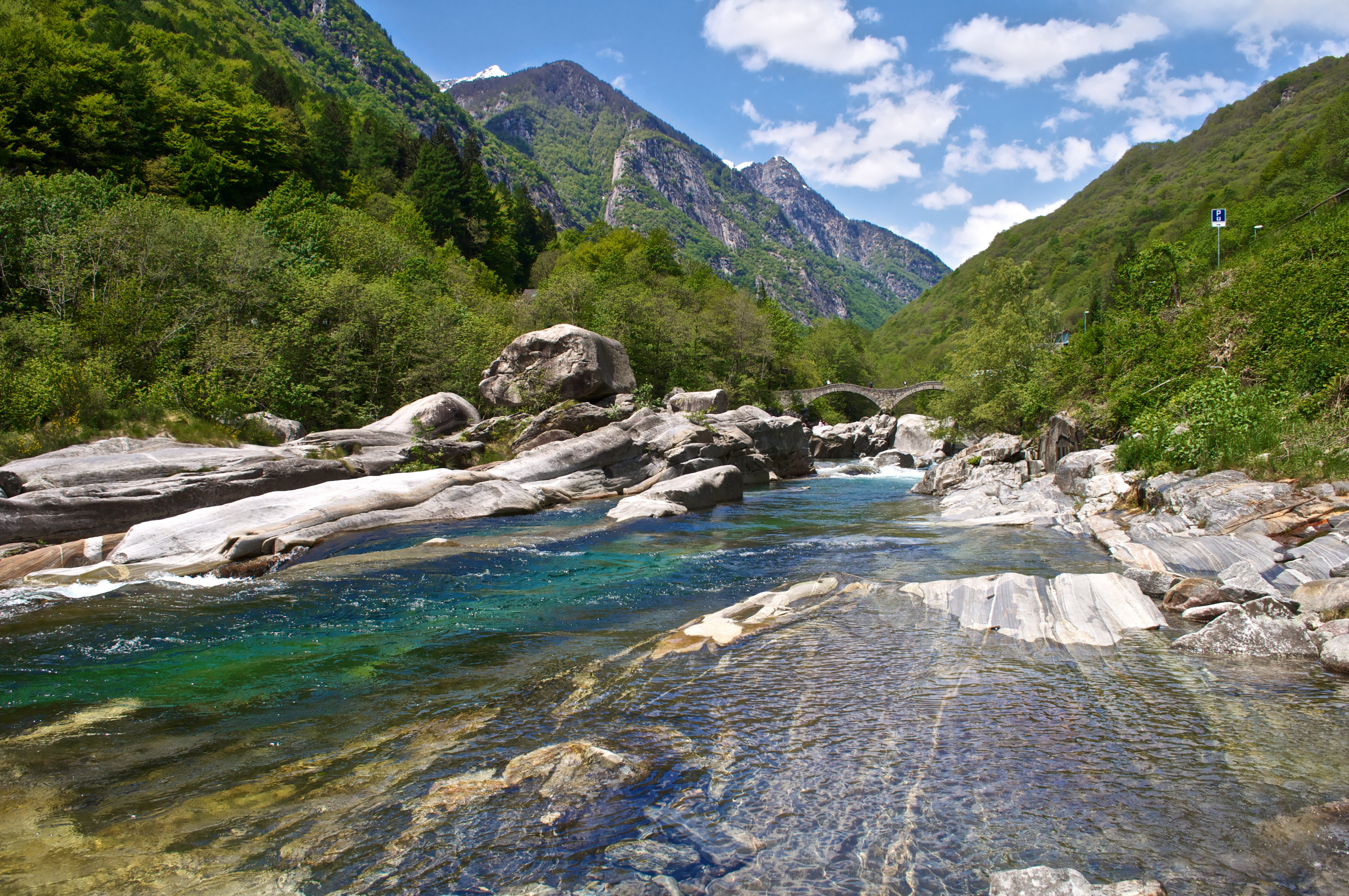
The Verzasca Valley (here near Lavertezzo) is the most central valley of Ticino

Ticino is the southernmost canton of Switzerland. With a few exceptions in the extreme north and south of the canton, it lies entirely in the Ticino basin, a tributary of the Po. Along with Valais and the Grisons, it is one of the three cantons whose territory extends into the Po basin (lands to the south of the Alps). However, unlike the other Po basin cantons (and all other cantons), all settlements of Ticino are on the south side of the Alps, therefore separated from the Swiss Plateau (and most of the country) by the great Alpine barrier. The canton also comprehends some small areas in the Rhine basin in the north, at the Gotthard Pass and around lake of Santa Maria. The extreme south of the canton is drained by the Po as well, but through the Breggia, Adda, Gaggiolo, Olona, and Lambro.

The canton is traditionally (but not administratively) split into two regions. The northern region, the Sopraceneri, is formed by the valleys around Lake Maggiore and includes the highest mountains of the canton and the main Alpine watershed. The southern region, the Sottoceneri, is the region around Lake Lugano, and marks the beginning of the southern Alpine foothills. Between the two regions is Monte Ceneri, a moderately elevated mountain pass and important north–south axis. The Sopraceneri is constituted by the districts of Bellinzona, Blenio, Leventina, Locarno, Riviera and Vallemaggia, and makes up about 85% of the territory and 43% of the population. The Sottoceneri is constituted by the districts of Lugano and Mendrisio, and makes up about 15% of the territory and 57% of the population. While Lugano, the largest city, is in the densely populated Sottoceneri, the two other main cities, Bellinzona and Locarno, are in the Sopraceneri.

The Ticino, which gives its name to the canton, is the largest river of Ticino. It flows from the northwest through the Bedretto Valley and the Leventina Valley to enter Lake Maggiore near Locarno. Its main tributaries are the Brenno in the Blenio Valley and the Moesa in the Mesolcina Valley in the Grisons. The lands of most of the canton are shaped by the river, which in its mid portion forms a wide valley, commonly known as the Riviera. The western lands of the canton, however, are drained by the Maggia. The Verzasca Valley is between the Leventina Valley and the Maggia Valley. There is also a smaller area that drains directly into the Lake Lugano. Most of the land is considered within the Alps, but a small area is part of the plain of the Po which drains the north of Italy.

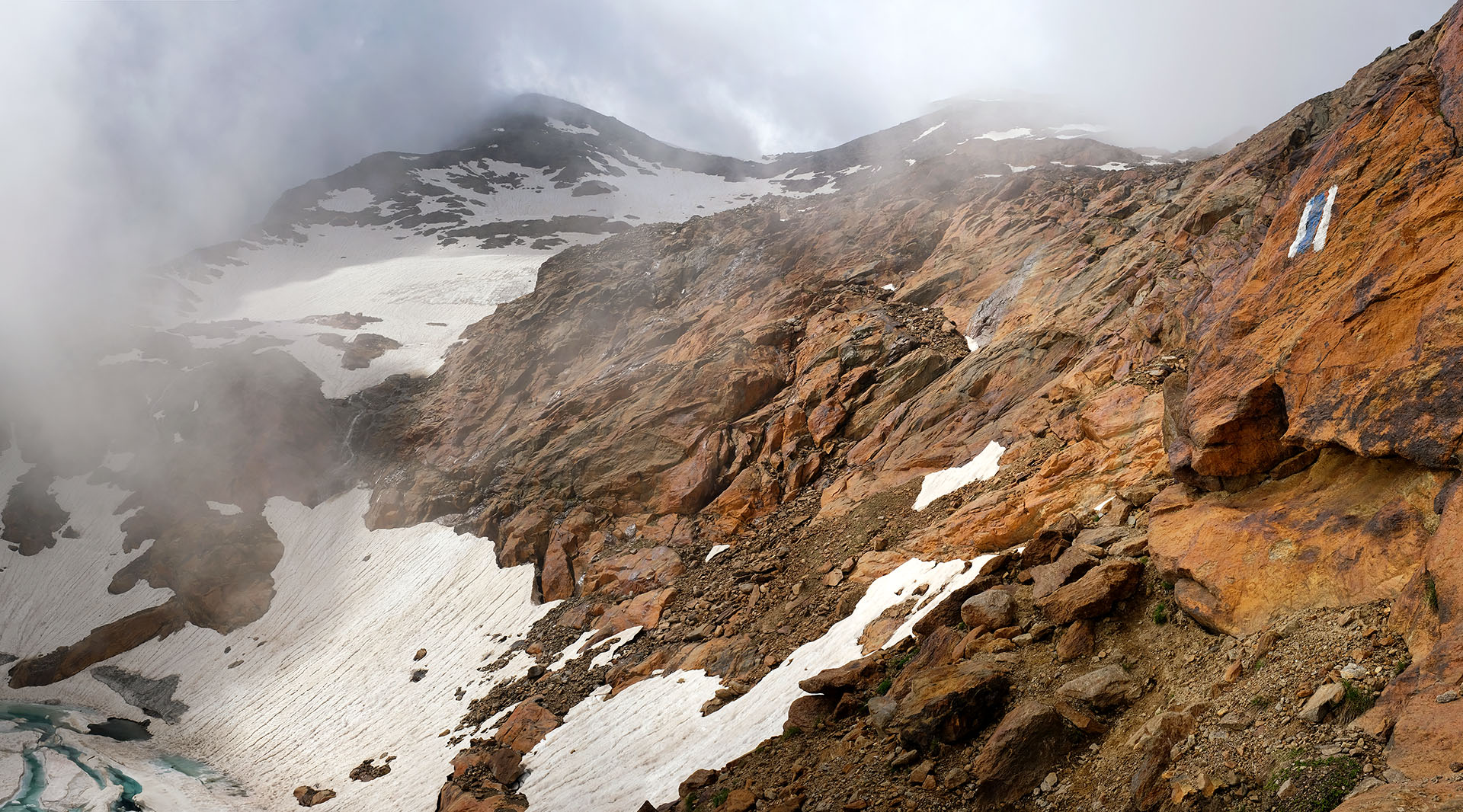
High Alpine landscape on Pizzo Campo Tencia

Although it includes the lowest point of Switzerland (Lake Maggiore) as well as its lowest town (Ascona), the topography of Ticino is extremely rugged, as it is the canton with the fourth largest elevation difference. It lies essentially within the Alps, in particular the Lepontine Alps, the Saint-Gotthard Massif and the Lugano Prealps. The longest and deepest valleys are those of the Ticino, Verzasca and Maggia. The two highest mountains are the Rheinwaldhorn and the Basòdino. Other notable mountains are Pizzo Rotondo (highest of the Gotthard Massif), Pizzo Campo Tencia (highest fully within the canton), Monte Generoso (highest south of Lake Lugano) and Monte Tamaro (most prominent of the canton). For an exhaustive list, see list of mountains of Ticino.

The area of the canton is 2,812 square kilometres (1,086 sq mi), of which about three-quarters are considered productive to trees or crops. Forests cover about a third of the area, but also the lakes Maggiore (or Verbano) and Lugano (or Ceresio) make up a considerable minority. The canton shares borders with three other cantons across the main ridge of the Alps: Valais to the northwest, to which it is connected by the Nufenen Pass, Uri to the north, to which it is connected by the Gotthard Pass and the Grisons to the northeast, to which it is connected by the Lukmanier Pass and the Mesolcina Valley; the latter valley, a few kilometres north of Bellinzona, being the only (natural) low elevation access to another canton. Ticino shares international borders with Italy as well. To the southwest is the region of Piedmont and to the southeast is the region of Lombardy. The main border crossing between Italy and Switzerland is that of Chiasso, in the extreme south of the canton.

=== Climate ===
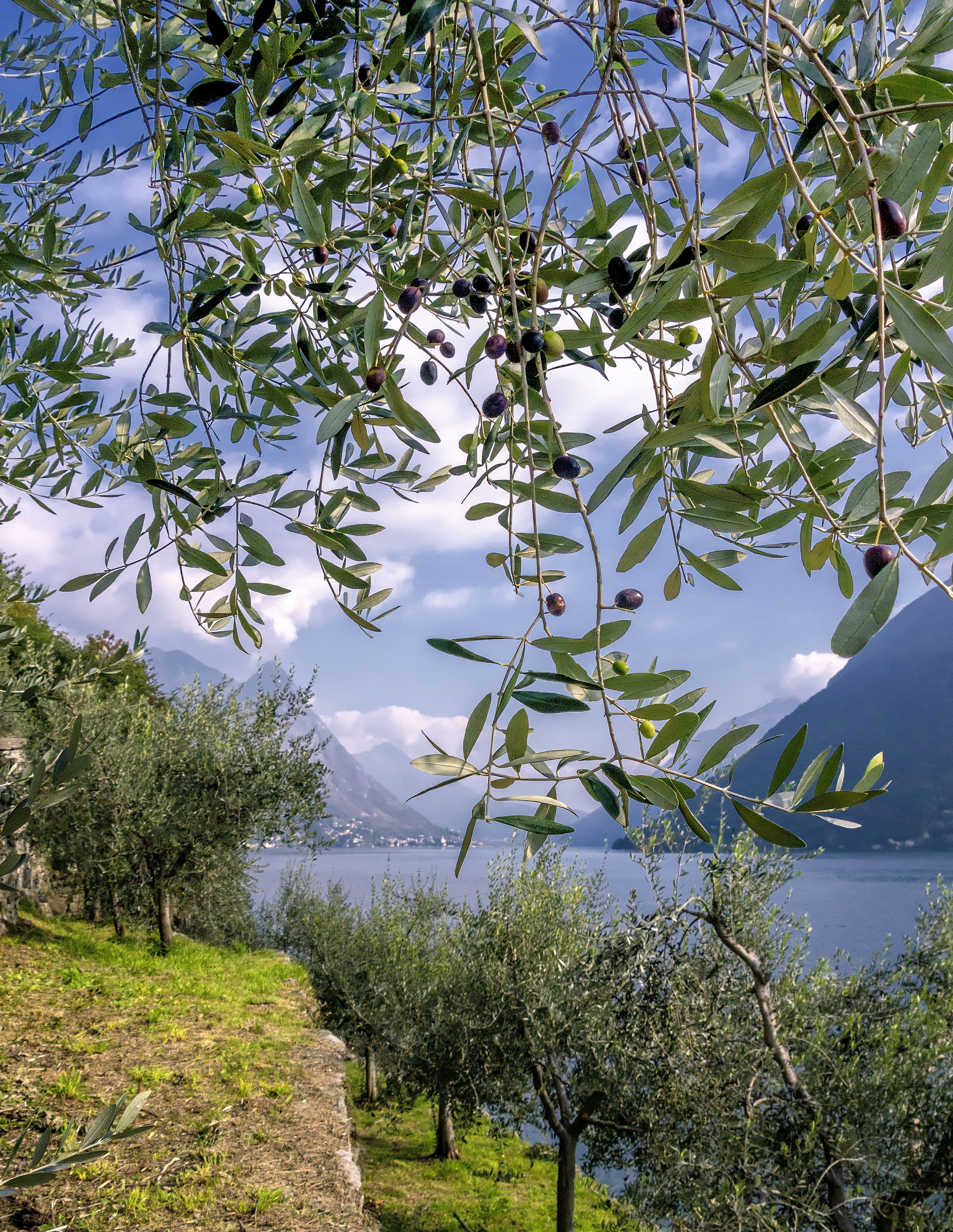
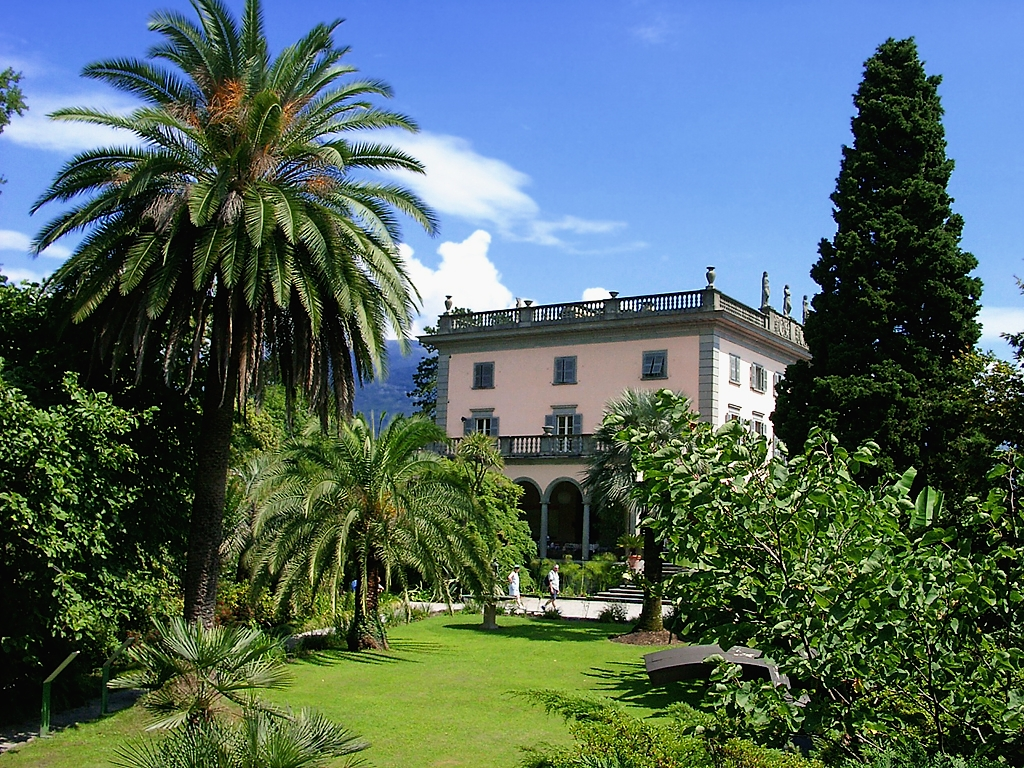
Olive trees at Gandria (Lake Lugano) and palm trees on the Brissago Islands (Lake Maggiore)

The climate of Ticino is mostly influenced by the Mediterranean Sea, the Alps protecting it from north European weather. As a consequence, the plains experience warm and moist summers, and mild winters. This climate is noticeably warmer and wetter than the rest of Switzerland's. In German-speaking Switzerland, Ticino is nicknamed Sonnenstube (sun porch), owing to the more than 2,300 sunshine hours the canton receives every year, compared to 1,700 for Zurich. The canton can experience particularly heavy storms and rainfalls in summer. It is the region of Switzerland with the highest level of lightning discharge. Conversely, the canton can experience severe droughts in both summer and winter, making it the region most affected by forest fires in the country.

The climate of Ticino is highly diverse as elevations range from Lake Maggiore, affected by subtropical climate, to the high Alps, affected by subarctic and tundra climate. Therefore, similarly to the rest of Switzerland, many different types of ecosystems are found in the region. In the lower areas, deciduous forests are omnipresent, while at high elevations they tend to be replaced by coniferous forests, except in the Sottoceneri (Lugano Prealps), where they are almost absent. The treeline is located at around 2,000 metres in the Sopraceneri and 1,600 metres in the Sottoceneri. The Basòdino, Ticino's second-highest mountain, is covered by the largest glacier of the canton. In winter, skiing is popular in the highest locations, notably in Airolo and Bosco/Gurin. In the lower regions, especially around Lake Maggiore and Lake Lugano, vineyards, olive trees and other fruits common to southern Europe are grown. Several types of cold hardy palm trees and other subtropical species may be grown here, and although none are native, their presence in the ecosystem is increasing. Numerous gardens, especially near the lakes, such as the Brissago Islands and the Scherrer Park, are renowned for their exotic plants.

=== Diocese ===
The Diocese of Lugano is co-extensive to the canton.

=== Wine region ===
Ticino is one of the wine regions for Swiss wine. The defined region encompasses all of the canton plus the neighbouring Italian-speaking district of Moesa (Misox and Calanca valleys) in the canton of the Grisons.

== Government ==
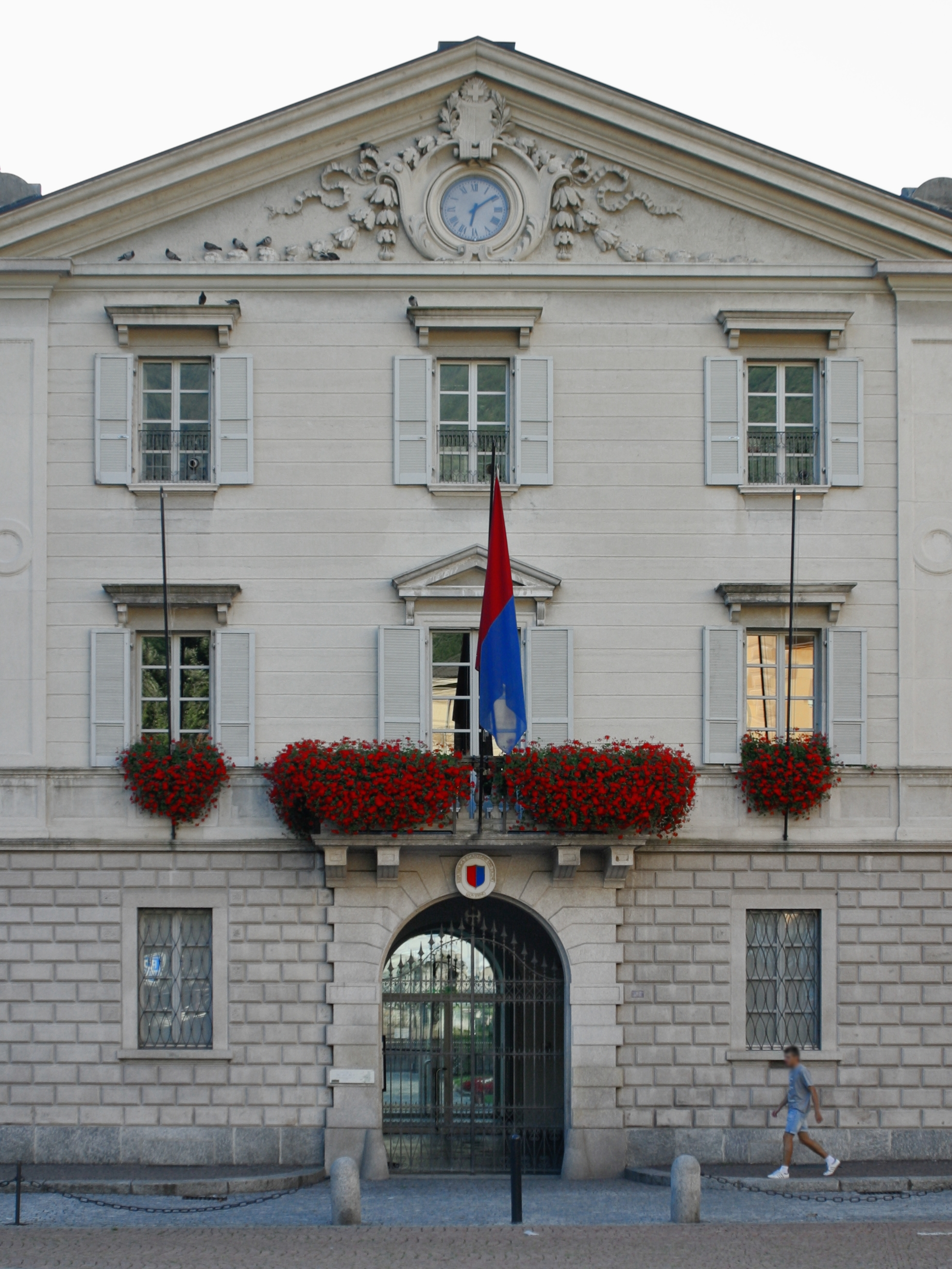
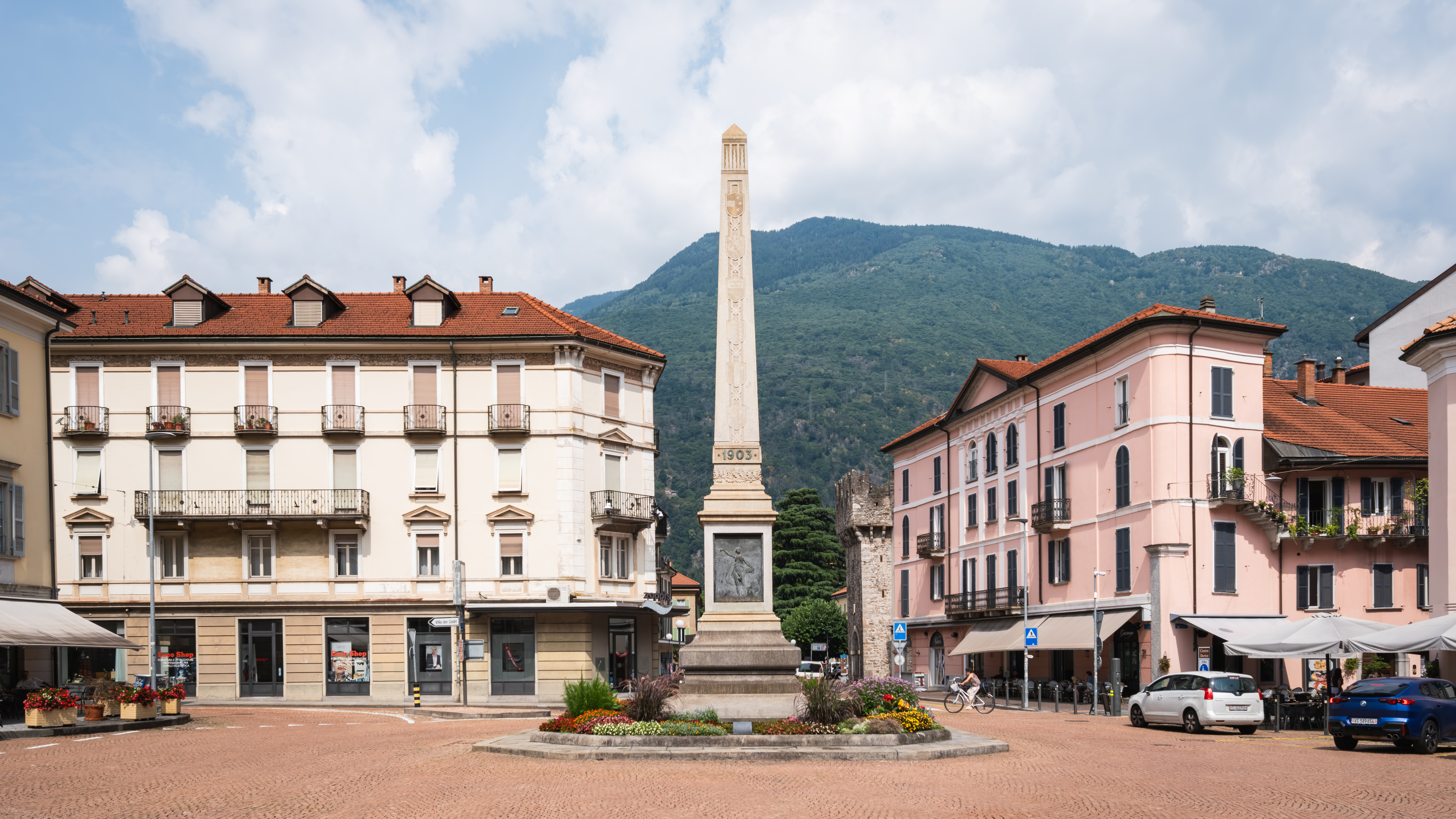
Palazzo delle Orsoline and nearby Piazza Indipendenza with commemorative obelisk in Bellinzona

The current Constitution of the Republic and Canton of Ticino, originating from a draft approved on 18 August 1801 during the Helvetic Republic, was approved on 14 December 1997. In its preamble, it states that it was created by the Ticinese people (popolo) "in order to guaranty peaceful life together with respect for the dignity of man, fundamental liberties and social justice (...) faithful to its historic task to interpret Italian culture within the Helvetic Confederation".

The Grand Council (Gran Consiglio) is the legislative authority of the canton, exercising sovereignty over any matter not explicitly delegated by the constitution to another authority. The Gran Consiglio has 90 members called deputati (deputies), elected in a single constituency using the proportional representation system. Deputies serve four-year terms, and annually nominate a President and two vice-presidents.

The five-member Council of State (Italian: Consiglio di Stato), not to be confused with the federal Council of States, is the executive authority of the canton, and it directs cantonal affairs according to law and the constitution. It is elected in a single constituency using the proportional representation system. Currently, the five members of the Government are Piero Marchesi, Raffaele De Rosa, Marina Carobbio Guscetti, Norman Gobbi and Christian Vitta.

Each year, the Council of State nominates its president. The current president of the Council of State is Marina Carobbio Guscetti.

The most recent elections were held in April 2023; the next elections will be on 11 April 2027.

The cantonal capital is Bellinzona. The Palazzo delle Orsoline on Piazza Governo is the meeting place for both the Grand Council and the Council of State. Nearby Piazza Governo is Piazza Indipendenza, which commemorates the independence of the canton.

== Politics ==
=== Federal election results ===
Percentage of the total vote per party in the canton in the National Council Elections 1971–2019
Party	Ideology	1971	1975	1979	1983	1987	1991	1995	1999	2003	2007	2011	2015	2019
FDP.The Liberals^{a}	Classical liberalism	38.4	39.1	36.3	37.9	34.8	29.4	30.5	27.7	29.8	28.1	24.8	23.7	20.5
CVP/PDC/PPD/PCD	Christian democracy	34.8	35.7	34.1	34.0	38.2	26.9	28.4	25.9	24.6	24.1	20.0	20.1	18.2
SP/PS	Social democracy	13.1	13.9	15.2	13.8	9.3	6.7	17.1	18.8	25.8	18.1	16.6	15.9	14.1
SVP/UDC	Conservatism	2.4	* ^{b}	2.3	2.1	1.3	1.0	1.5	5.3	7.6	8.7	9.7	11.3	11.7
EVP/PEV	Christian democracy	*	*	*	*	*	*	*	0.2	*	*	*	*	*
GLP/PVL	Green liberalism	*	*	*	*	*	*	*	*	*	*	*	0.8	1.0
PdA/PST-POP/PC/PSL	Socialism	2.8	3.6	2.7	*	1.2	0.7	1.3	1.3	*	1.3	1.2	0.5	0.8
PSA	Socialism	6.7	7.6	9.4	10.6	11.0	10.0	^{c}	*	*	*	*	*	*
GPS/PES	Green politics	*	*	*	*	1.9	1.0	1.7	1.4	3.0	4.8	6.7	3.5	12.1
FGA	Feminist	*	*	*	*	0.9	*	*	*	*	*	*	*	*
SD/DS	National conservatism	1.8	*	*	*	*	*	*	*	*	*	*	*	*
Ticino League	Right-wing populism	*	*	*	*	*	23.5	18.6	18.5	8.0	14.0	17.5	21.7	16.9
Other		*	0.2	*	1.8	1.4	0.8	1.0	0.9	1.3	0.8	3.4	2.4	4.7
Voter participation %		60.6	64.7	59.6	61.6	60.2	67.5	52.8	49.7	48.6	47.4	54.3	54.4	49.8

^a FDP before 2009, FDP.The Liberals after 2009
^b "*" indicates that the party was not on the ballot in this canton.
^c Part of the SP/PS

=== Referendum decisions ===
Since a referendum in September 2013, Ticino is the only Swiss canton where wearing full-face veils is illegal. Supporters of the ban cited the case of a 20-year-old Pakistani woman from Bellinzona, who was killed by her husband for refusing to wear a headscarf. The Burqa ban was later approved by the Grand Council in November 2015.

In September 2016, Ticino voters approved a Swiss People's Party-sponsored referendum that gives precedence to Swiss workers, as opposed to foreign workers, defying freedom of movement agreements between Switzerland and the EU.

== Administrative subdivisions ==
=== Districts ===
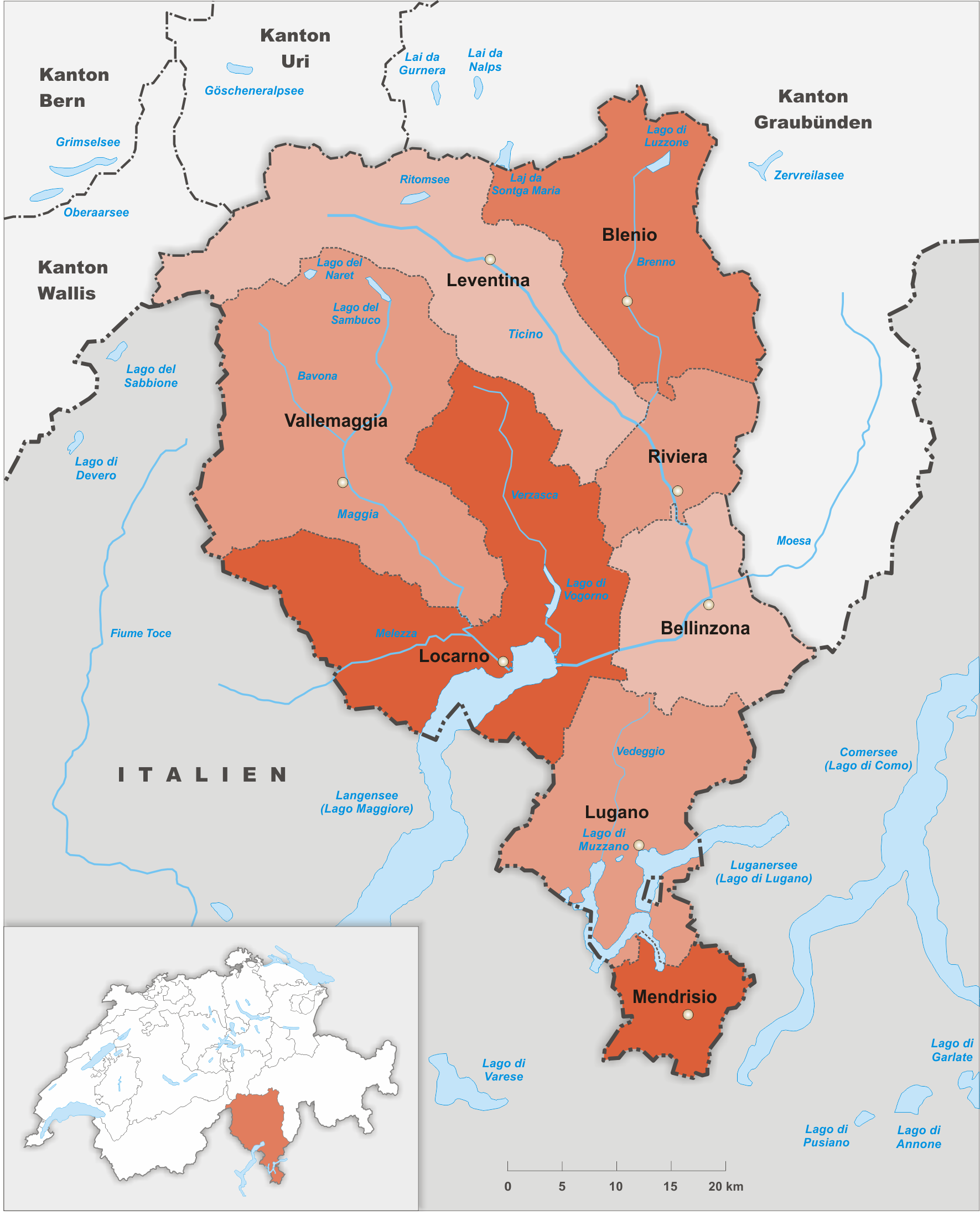
Districts of Ticino canton

The canton is divided into eight districts:

- Bellinzona with capital Bellinzona
- Blenio with capital Acquarossa
- Leventina with capital Faido
- Locarno with capital Locarno
- Lugano with capital Lugano
- Mendrisio with capital Mendrisio
- Riviera with capital Osogna
- Vallemaggia with capital Cevio

=== History of the districts ===
Leventina was a subject of the canton of Uri until 1798, the year the Helvetic Republic was founded, when it became part of the new canton of Bellinzona along with the Swiss condominiums of Bellinzona, Riviera and Blenio. The condominiums of Locarno, Lugano, Mendrisio and Vallemaggia became part of the new canton of Lugano in 1798. These two cantons formed into one canton, Ticino, in 1803 when it joined the (restored) Swiss Confederation as a member canton. The former condominiums and Leventina became the eight districts of the canton of Ticino, which exist to the present day and are provided for by the cantonal constitution.

=== Municipalities and circles ===
There are 100 municipalities in the canton (as of April 2025). These municipalities (comuni) are grouped in 38 circoli (circles or sub-districts) which are in turn grouped into the eight districts (distretti).

The mayor (sindaco) is the president of the municipal government (municipio) which comprises at least three members; a council also exists. The members of the council and the municipio are elected every four years by the citizens resident in the comune – the next elections are scheduled for April 2024.

Since the late 1990s, there has been an ongoing project to aggregate some municipalities, with the constitution of the canton allowing for the Grand Council of Ticino to promote and lead in deciding on mergers. This has resulted in changes to some of the circles, with many circles now consisting of just one or two municipalities. The most populous municipality – Lugano (having merged with numerous other municipalities) – is subdivided into quartieri (quarters) which are grouped into three (cantonal) circles. In the modern day, the circle serves only as a territorial unit with limited public functions, most notably the local judiciary.

== Demographics ==
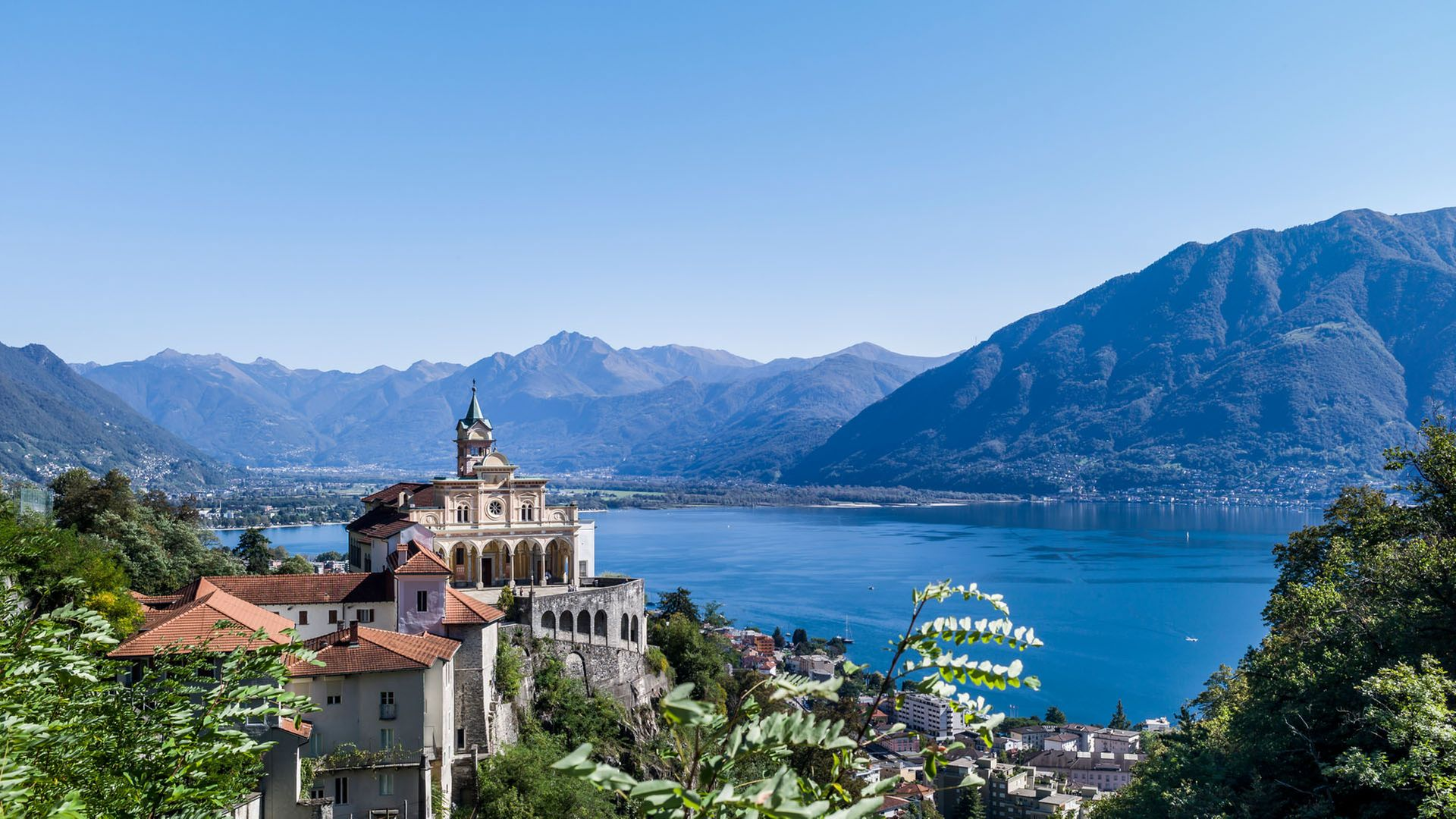
The canton is predominantly Catholic (here the Madonna del Sasso sanctuary in Orselina)

Religion in canton of Ticino (age 15+, 2012)
1. Catholic (70.0%)
2. Swiss Reformed Church (4.00%)
3. Other Christian Churches (5.00%)
4. Islam (2.00%)
5. Other religion (1.00%)
6. Unaffiliated (16.0%)
7. Undetermined (2.00%)

Ticino has a population (as of 31 December 2020) of 350,986. As of 2013, the population included 94,366 foreigners, or about 27.2% of the total population. The largest groups of foreign population were Italians (46.2%), followed by Croats (6.5%) and Portuguese (5.9%). The population density (in 2005) is 114.6 persons per km^{2}. As of 2000, 83.1% of the population spoke Italian, 8.3% spoke German and 1.7% spoke Serbo-Croatian.

As of 2019, 70.0% of the total population was Catholic. According to a 2012 survey, the population aged 15 years and older was mostly Catholic (70%); further Christian denominations accounted for 10% of the population (including Swiss Reformed 4%), 2% were Muslim and 1% of the population adhered to another religion (including Jews 0.1%).

The official language, and the one used for most written communication, is Swiss Italian. Despite being very similar to standard Italian, Swiss Italian presents some differences to the Italian spoken in Italy due to the influence of French and German from which it assimilates words. Dialects of the Lombard language such as Ticinese are still spoken, especially in the valleys, but they are not used for official purposes.

Despite the dominance of Italian speakers, fluency in Standard or Swiss German is sometimes taken to be an important prerequisite for employment, regardless of sector or sphere of work.

In 2016, Ticino was the European region with the second highest life expectancy at 85.0 years, and the highest male life expectancy at 82.7 years.

=== Historical population ===
The historical population is given in the following table:

Historic Population Data
Year	Total Population	Swiss	Non-Swiss	Population share of total country
1850	117 759	109,952	7,807	4.9%
1880	130,394	110,306	20,088	4.6%
1900	138,638	108,181	30,457	4.2%
1950	175,055	144,909	30,146	3.7%
1970	245,458	177,954	67,504	3.9%
2000	306,846	228,057	78,789	4.2%
2020	350,986			4.1%

== Economy ==
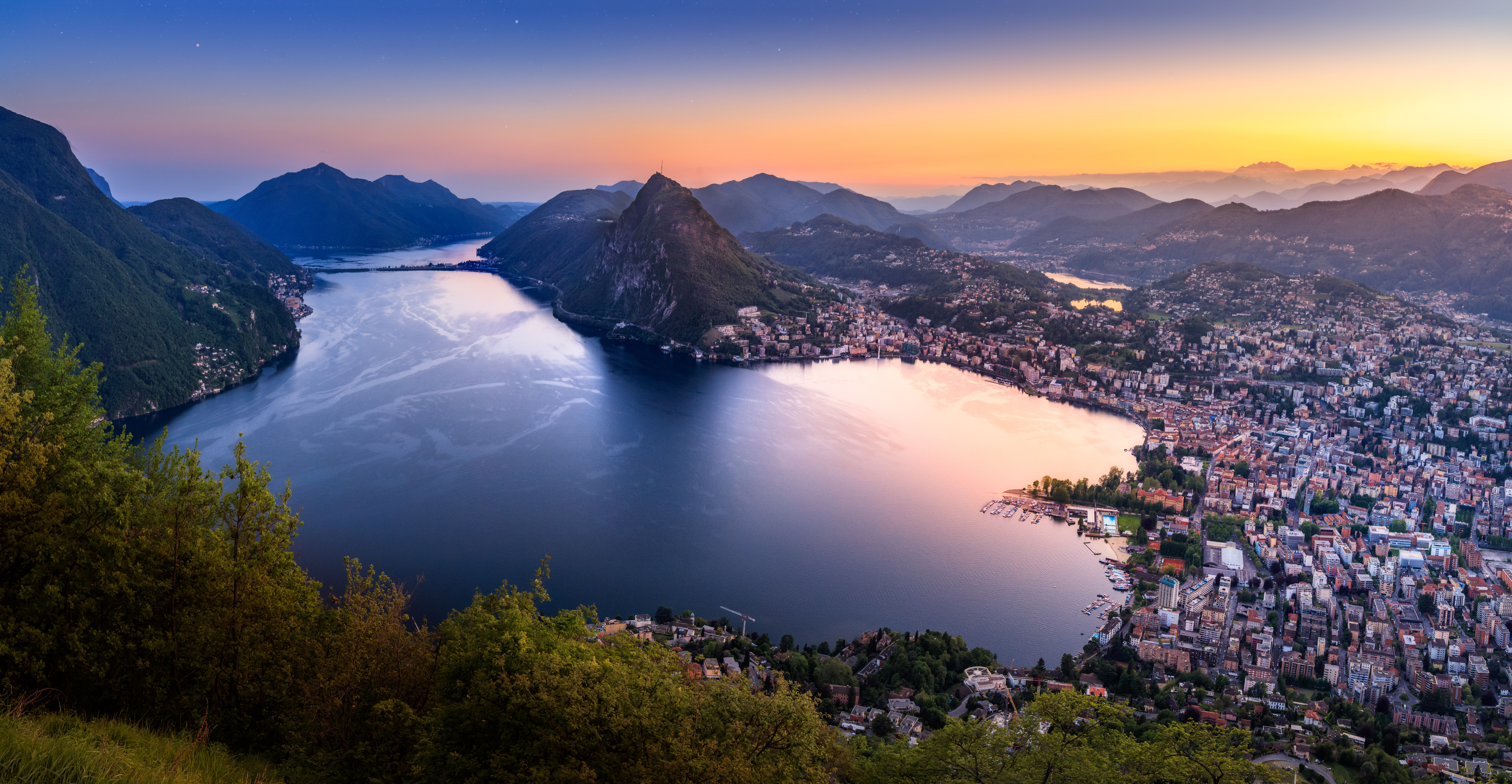
Lugano, the largest Italian-speaking city of Switzerland

Tertiary sector workers make up 76.5% of the Ticinese workforce, compared to the Swiss average of 67.1%. Commerce (23.1%), tourism (10.1%) and financial activities (3.9%) are all important for the local economy, while the contribution from agriculture and fishing is marginal, employing 6.5% of the workforce on a Swiss average of 15.4%. The median gross private sector monthly salary in 2012 was 5,091 francs (US$5,580), below the national average of 6,118 francs (US$6,703). However, due to lesser cost of living and lower taxation compared to most other cantons, the overall disposable mean income is high. The GDP per capita at 82,438 francs in 2014, was seventh highest in Switzerland. Ticino is counted among the most prosperous regions of Switzerland and of Europe.

Lugano is Switzerland's third largest financial centre after Zurich and Geneva. The banking industry alone has 8,400 employees and generates 17% of the gross cantonal product. Because of Ticino's shared language and culture, its financial industry has very close ties to Italy. In 2017, Ticino had an unemployment rate of 4%, higher than the Switzerland average which was estimated at 3.7%.

Frontalieri, commuter workers living in Italy (mostly in the provinces of Varese and Como) but working regularly in Ticino, form a large part (over 20%) of the workforce, far larger than in the rest of Switzerland, where the rate is below 5%. Foreigners in general hold 44.3% of all the jobs, again a much higher rate than elsewhere in the Confederation (27%). Frontalieri are usually paid less than Swiss workers for their jobs, and tend to serve as low-cost labour.

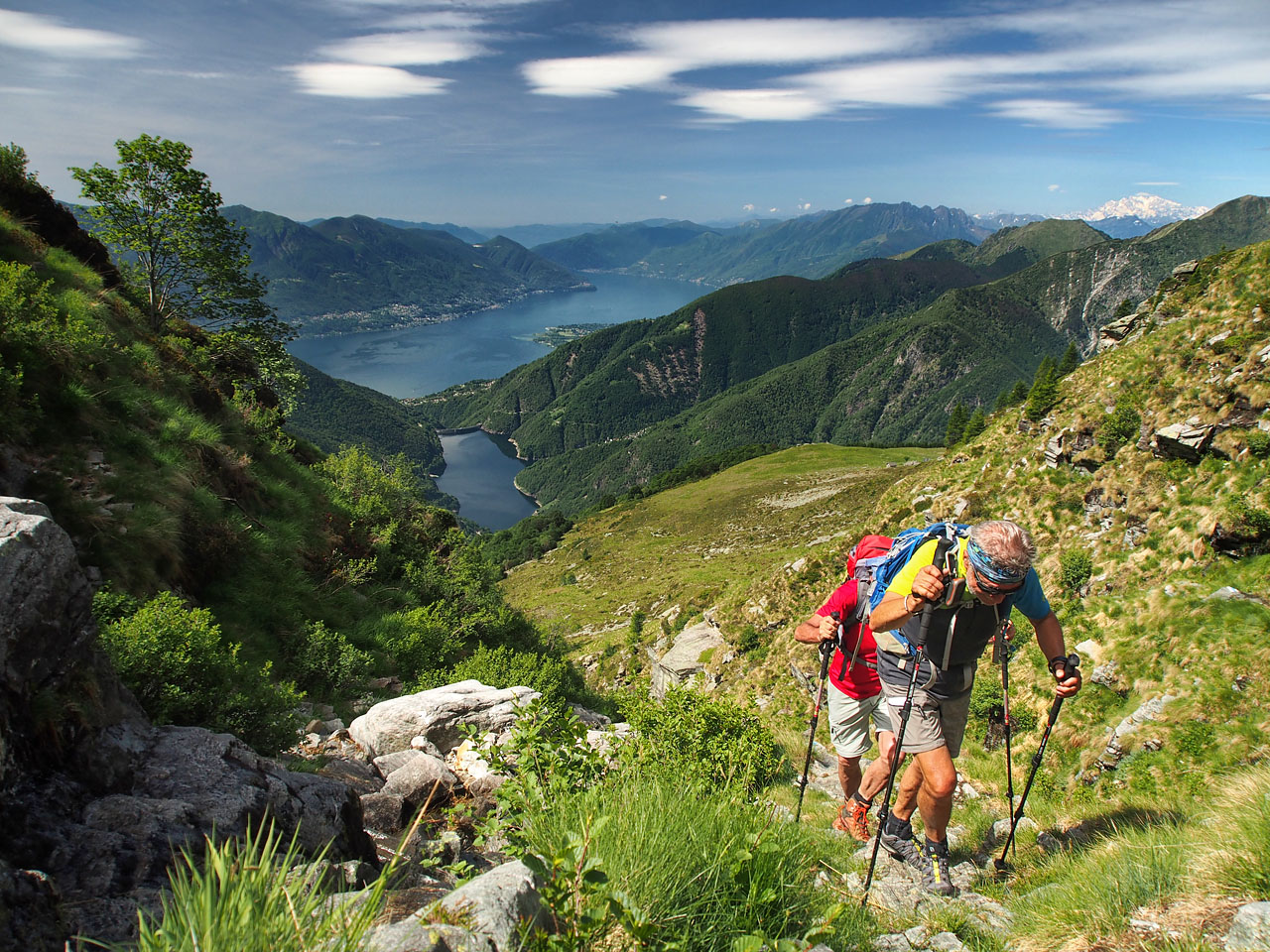
Hikers above Lake Maggiore. Ticino is a popular tourist destination for its climate and scenery

Italy is by far Ticino's most important foreign trading partner, but there's a huge trade deficit between imports (5 billion CHF) and exports (1.9 billion). By 2013, Germany had become the canton's main export market, receiving 23.1% of the total, compared to 15.8% for Italy and 9.9% for the United States. Many Italian companies relocate to Ticino, either temporarily or permanently, seeking lower taxes and an efficient bureaucracy: just as many Ticinese entrepreneurs doing business in Italy complain of red tape and widespread protectionism. The region has been attracting multinational companies particularly from the fashion industry due to its closeness to Milan. Hugo Boss, Gucci, VF Corporation and other popular brands are located there. Because the international fashion business has become a significant employer for Swiss and Italians alike, the region has also been termed the "Fashion Valley".

Three of the world's largest gold refineries are based in Ticino, including the Pamp refinery in Castel San Pietro, the leading manufacturer of minted gold bars. Large companies based in the canton include: Bally, Hupac.

The opening of the Gotthard Railway in 1882 led to the establishment of a sizeable tourist industry mostly catering to German speakers, although since the early 2000s the industry has suffered from the competition of more distant destinations. In 2011, 1,728,888 overnight stays were recorded. The mild climate throughout the year makes the canton a popular destination for hikers. The high Alps of Ticino include numerous tourist facilities such as the Monte Generoso Railway, the Ritom Funicular and the Cardada Cableway. Among other tourist attractions are the Verzasca Dam, popular with bungee jumpers, and Swissminiatur in Melide, a miniature park featuring scale models of over 120 Swiss monuments. The Brissago Islands on Lake Maggiore are the only Swiss islands south of the Alps, and house botanical gardens with 1,600 different plant species from five continents.

== Transport ==
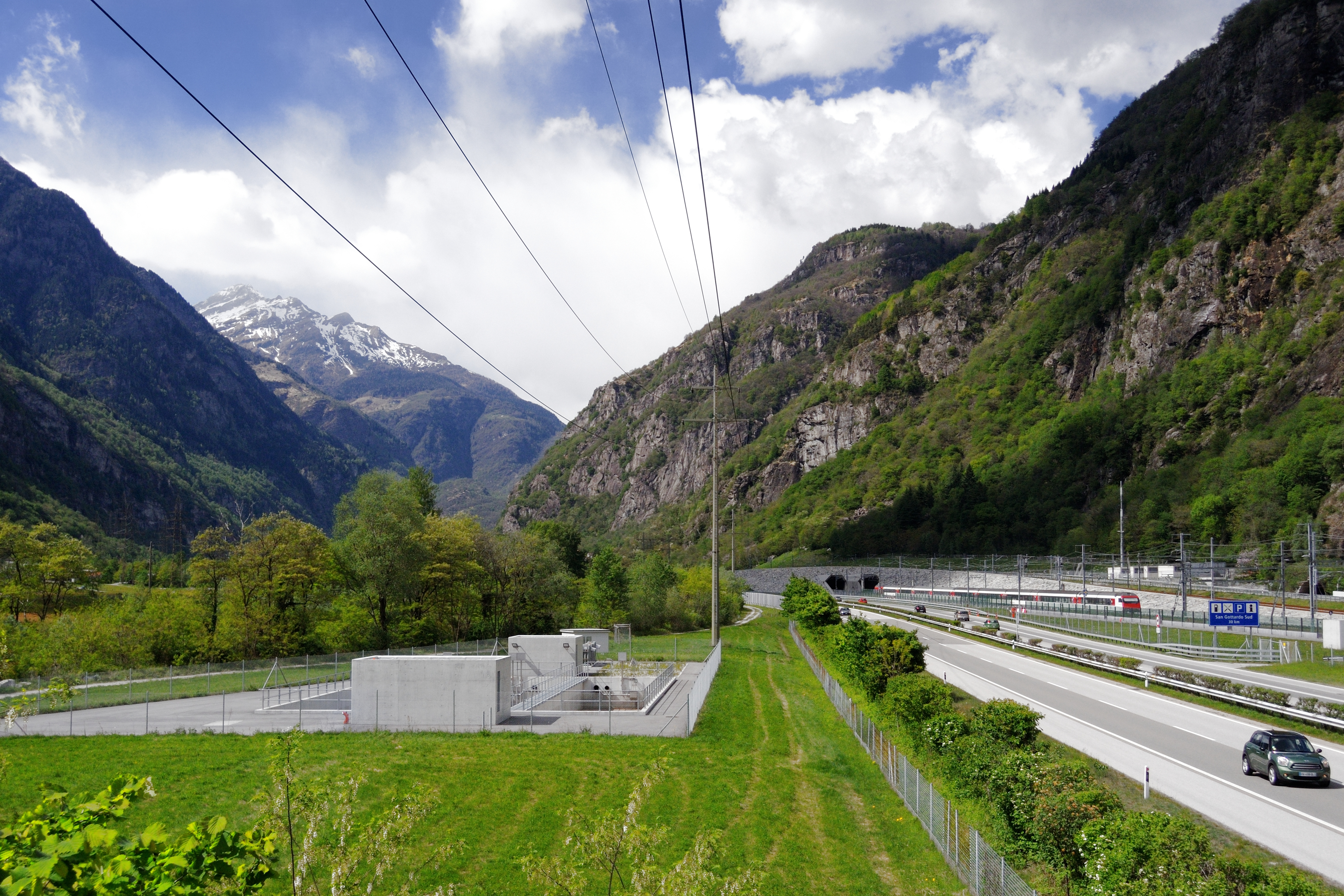
Leventina Valley. Leading to Central Switzerland, the Gotthard axis consists of several railways and highways, here the A2 motorway and south portal of the Gotthard Base Tunnel.

The Gotthard is a strategic mountain pass of Central Switzerland and Ticino since the 13th century. Several tunnels underneath the Gotthard connect the canton to northern Switzerland: the first to open was the 15 kilometres (9.3 mi) long Gotthard Rail Tunnel in 1882, replacing the pass road, connecting Airolo with Göschenen in the canton of Uri. A 17 km (11 mi) motorway tunnel, the Gotthard Road Tunnel, opened in 1980. A second rail tunnel through the pass, the Gotthard Base Tunnel, was opened on 1 June 2016. The new tunnel is the longest tunnel in the world, reducing travel time between Zürich and Lugano to 1 hour 40 minutes. It is the first flat route through the Alps and provides for the first time a low-level route to the cities of the Swiss Plateau.

The Ceneri Base Tunnel, inaugurated in 2020, constitutes another revolution in the canton, by providing fast links to both Locarno and Bellinzona from Lugano, and making the latter city an important railway node. The base tunnel bypasses the old Monte Ceneri axis.

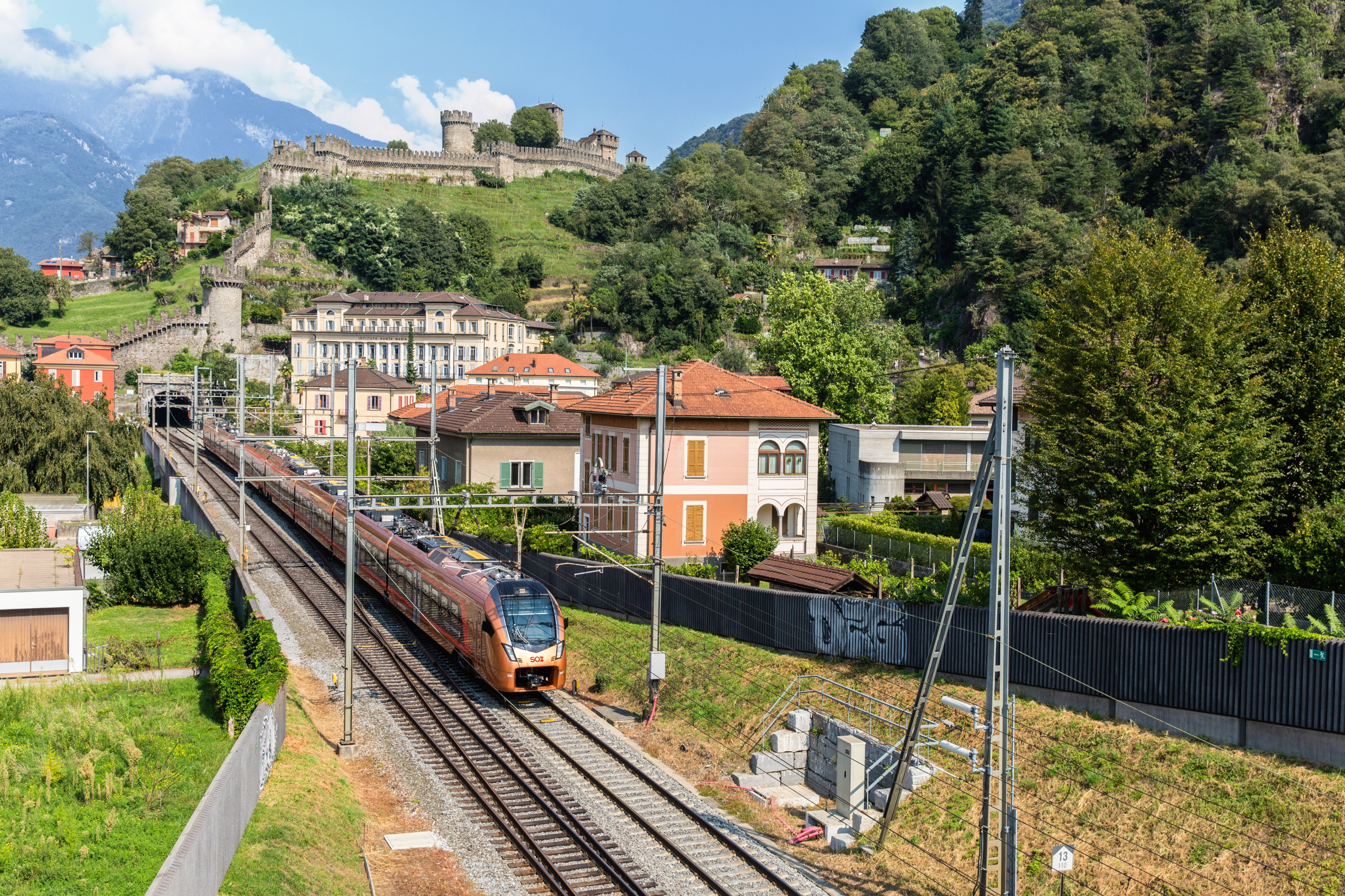
Treno Gottardo at Bellinzona

Treni Regionali Ticino Lombardia (TiLo), a joint venture between the Italian Ferrovie dello Stato and the Swiss Federal Railways launched in 2004, manages the traffic between the regional railways of Lombardy and the Ticino railway network via a S-Bahn system. The canton is also served by the Treno Gottardo from northern Switzerland, operated by the Südostbahn (SOB).

The Regional Bus and Rail Company of Ticino provides the urban and suburban bus network of Locarno, operates the cable cars between Verdasio and Rasa, and between Intragna – Pila – Costa on behalf of the owning companies, and, together with an Italian company, the Centovalli and Vigezzina Railway which connects the Gotthard trans-Alpine rail route at Locarno with the Simplon trans-Alpine route at Domodossola, with further connections with Brig in Valais.

The canton has a higher than average incidence of traffic accidents, recording 16 deaths or serious injuries per 100 million km in the 2004–2006 period, compared to a Swiss average of 6.

Since March 2025, there are no regular flights scheduled to or from Lugano Airport. Currently, only Silver Air operates to Lugano Airport. While there is limited service to Lugano's airport, the nearest airport to the area is Milan Malpensa Airport which is connected to Lugano by a direct hourly train with a travel time of 1:45h from/to Lugano, or about one hour, 80 km by road.

== Education and science ==
There are two major centres of education and research located in the canton of Ticino. University of Italian Switzerland (USI, Università della Svizzera Italiana) in Lugano is the only Swiss university teaching primarily in Italian. The University of Applied Sciences and Arts of Southern Switzerland (SUPSI, Scuola Universitaria Professionale della Svizzera Italiana), in Manno, is a professional training college focused on a practical method of teaching in the areas of applied art, economy, social work, technology and production science.

There is also a small American and Swiss accredited private college, Franklin University Switzerland, located above Lugano, as well as The American School in Switzerland in Collina d'Oro, a K-13 international school accepting day and boarding students.

== Culture ==
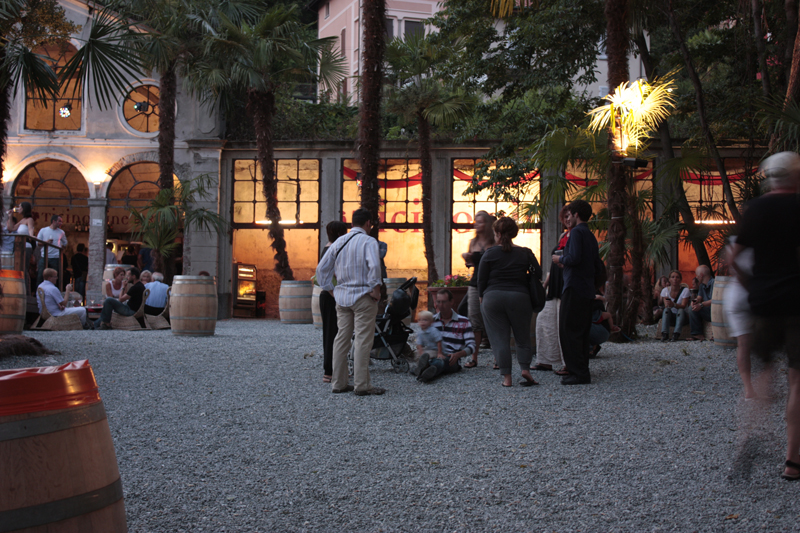
People gathering on Piazza Grande during the Locarno Festival

=== Cultural identity ===
As the only predominantly Italian-speaking canton, Ticino notably distinguishes itself from the rest of the country by its meridional, or Mediterranean, culture. Cultural identity of Ticino is complex and is marked by its long history as a bailiwick of the Swiss Confederacy, until its independence of 1803. Ticinese identity was gradually forged in the 19th century, partly thanks to the efforts of major intellectual figures such as Stefano Franscini and Carlo Cattaneo. Cantonal patriotism is particularly strong in Ticino; this is reflected by the use of the term repubblica in official documents.

=== Architecture ===
Ticino is particularly known for its rich architectural heritage, ranging from the anonymous rock architecture of grottos and splüi, over Romanesque and baroque to contemporary styles. The birthplace of Francesco Borromini, the canton is home to internationally recognized architects, such as Mario Botta, Aurelio Galfetti, Luigi Snozzi, and Livio Vacchini. As early as the 18th century, aristocrats from Russia and Italy employed numerous architects from Ticino. More recently, the region became a centre of the Neo-Rationalist Tendenza movement.

=== World heritage sites ===
Ticino hosts four World Heritage Sites: the Three Castles of Bellinzona, Monte San Giorgio and the living traditions of the holy week processions in Mendrisio and the Valle di Lodano Forest Reserve.

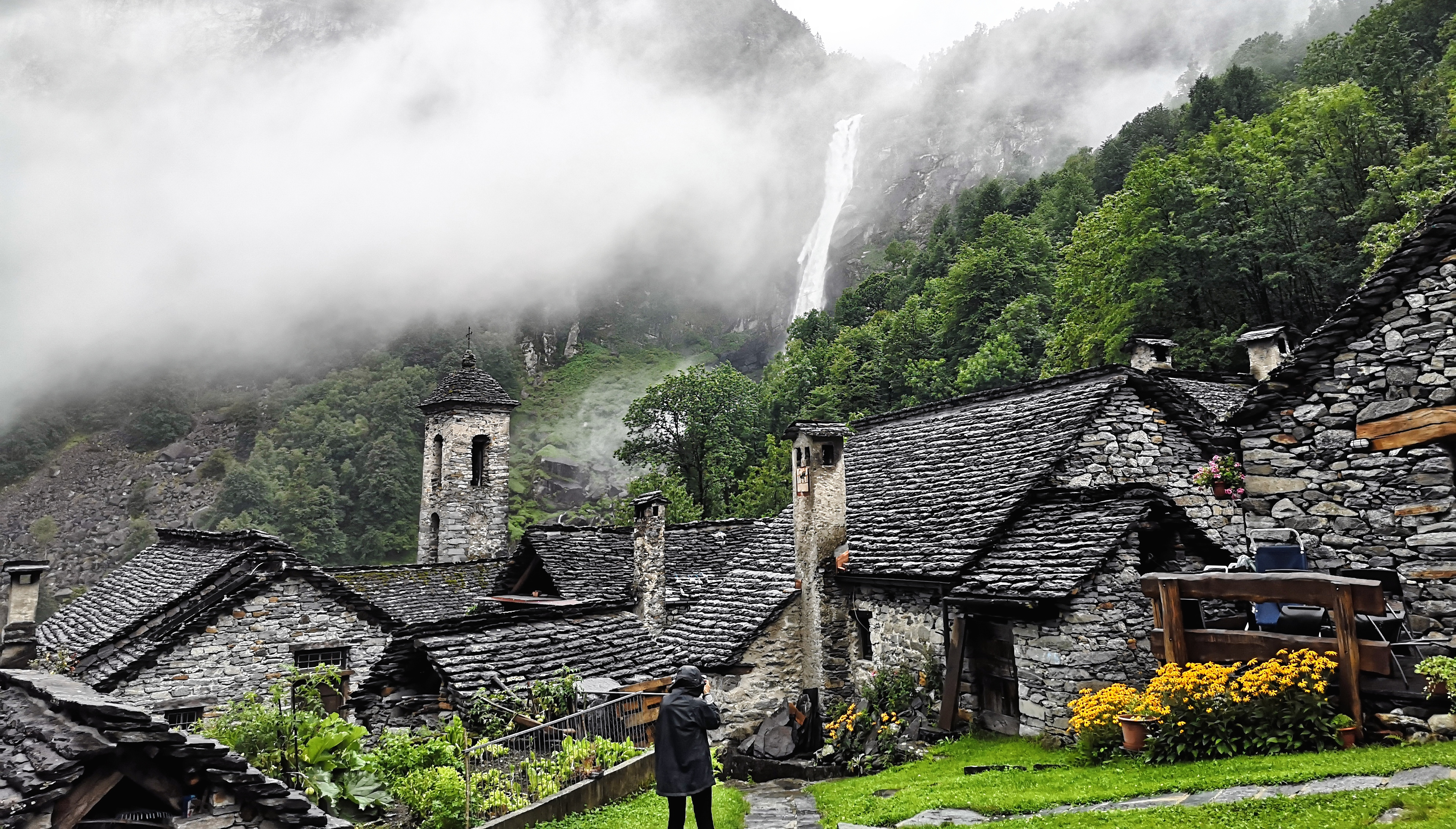
Rustic stone houses in Foroglio (Val Bavona - Maggia Valley)

=== Film ===
During the second week of August, Locarno is host to the Locarno International Film Festival, Switzerland's most prestigious film festival.

=== Music ===
Estival Jazz, a free open-air jazz festival, is held in Lugano and Mendrisio in late June and July. Another jazz festival is held in Ascona. Rabadan is the major carnival festival of the canton. It has been ongoing now for more than 150 years.

Traditional folk music of Ticino also distinguishes itself from that of northern Switzerland. Among traditional instruments are the accordion, the guitar and, since the 19th century, the mandolin. Duos and trios with mandolin and guitar typically accompany regional folk songs. However, like most of Switzerland, Ticino has a long brass-band tradition. A regional, reduced version, is the bandella, an ensemble consisting of brass instruments and clarinets.

== Media ==
Newspapers and magazines published in Ticino include Corriere del Ticino, LaRegione Ticino, Giornale del Popolo, Il Mattino della Domenica, Il Caffè (newspaper), L'Informatore, and the German-language Tessiner Zeitung. In Lugano is based Radiotelevisione svizzera (RSI), a radio and television broadcasting branch of the national Swiss Broadcasting Corporation.

== Sport ==
Bocce is a folk game that was once a popular pastime locally, but by the early 21st century it was seldom played by younger people.

Professional sports teams include HC Lugano, HC Ambrì-Piotta (ice hockey), AC Bellinzona, FC Lugano (men's association football) and Lugano Tigers (basketball). Other teams include FF Lugano 1976 (women's association football), GDT Bellinzona Snakes, (ice hockey) FC Chiasso, FC Mendrisio, FC Paradiso and FC Locarno (men's association football). The canton also has a Canton Ticino football team which is a member of CONIFA.

Lugano has hosted the Italy-Belgium match at the 1954 FIFA World Cup at the Cornaredo Stadium, the 1953 and 1996 UCI Road World Championships, the 18th Chess Olympiad and the 2018 and 2019 editions of the Ladies Open Lugano women's tennis tournament.

Lugano's routine events include the annual BSI Challenger Lugano tennis tournament, the Gran Premio Città di Lugano Memorial Albisetti 20 km racewalk, and the Scenic Trail skyrunning competition. Bellinzona hosts the Bellinzona Ladies Open women's tennis tournament.

== Cuisine ==
A family harvesting chestnuts in the early 1900s.

Polenta, along with chestnuts and potatoes, was for centuries one of the staple foods in Ticino, and it remains a mainstay of local cuisine. Nowadays, the most typical dishes are polenta, often served with meat (such as rabbit) and gravy sauce, and risotto, sometimes with saffron. Local products of Ticino, called Nostrani, include a large variety of cheeses, meat specialities such as salami and prosciutto, and wines, especially red merlot. Olive oil is produced in small quantities but olive cultivation is growing in the canton.

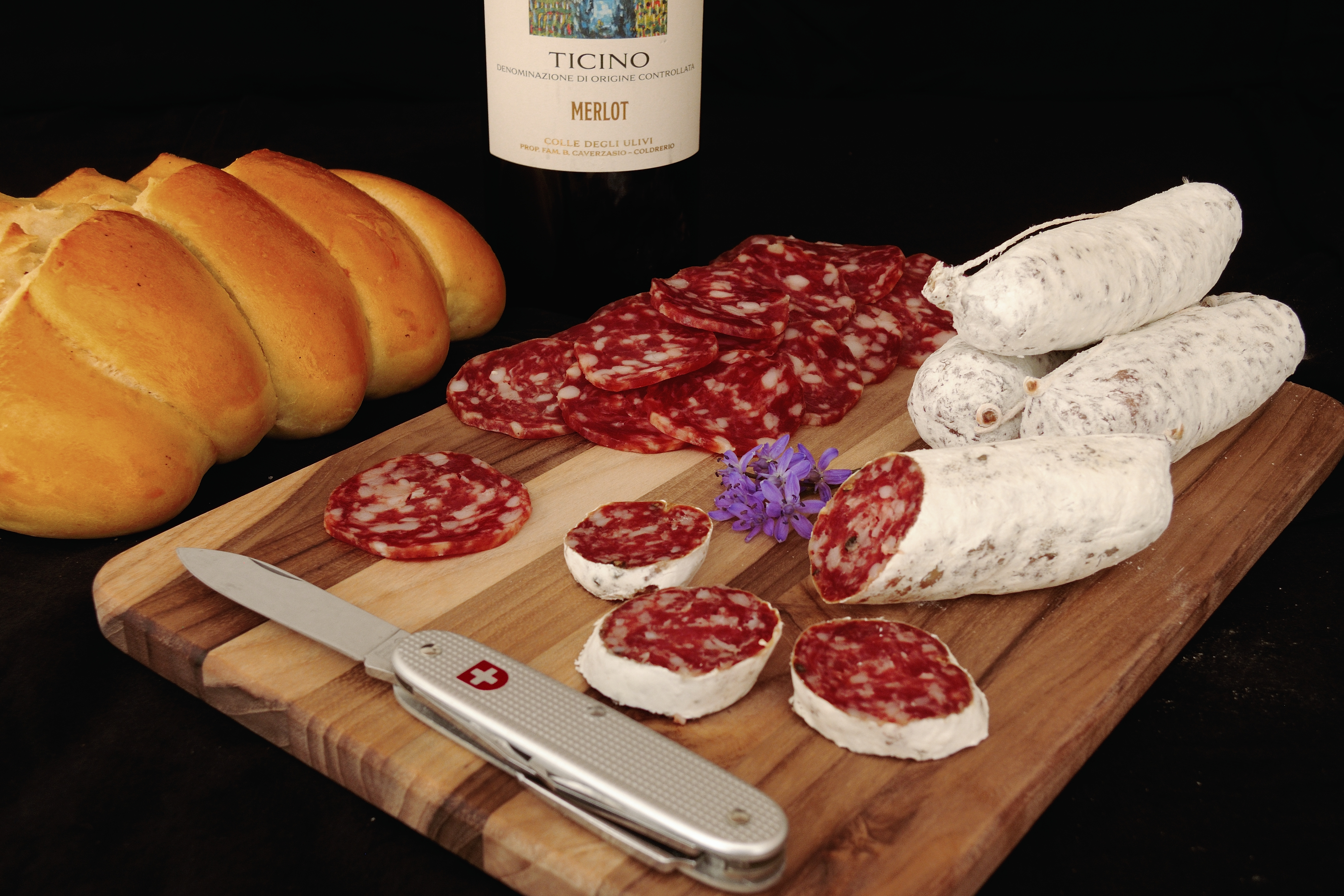
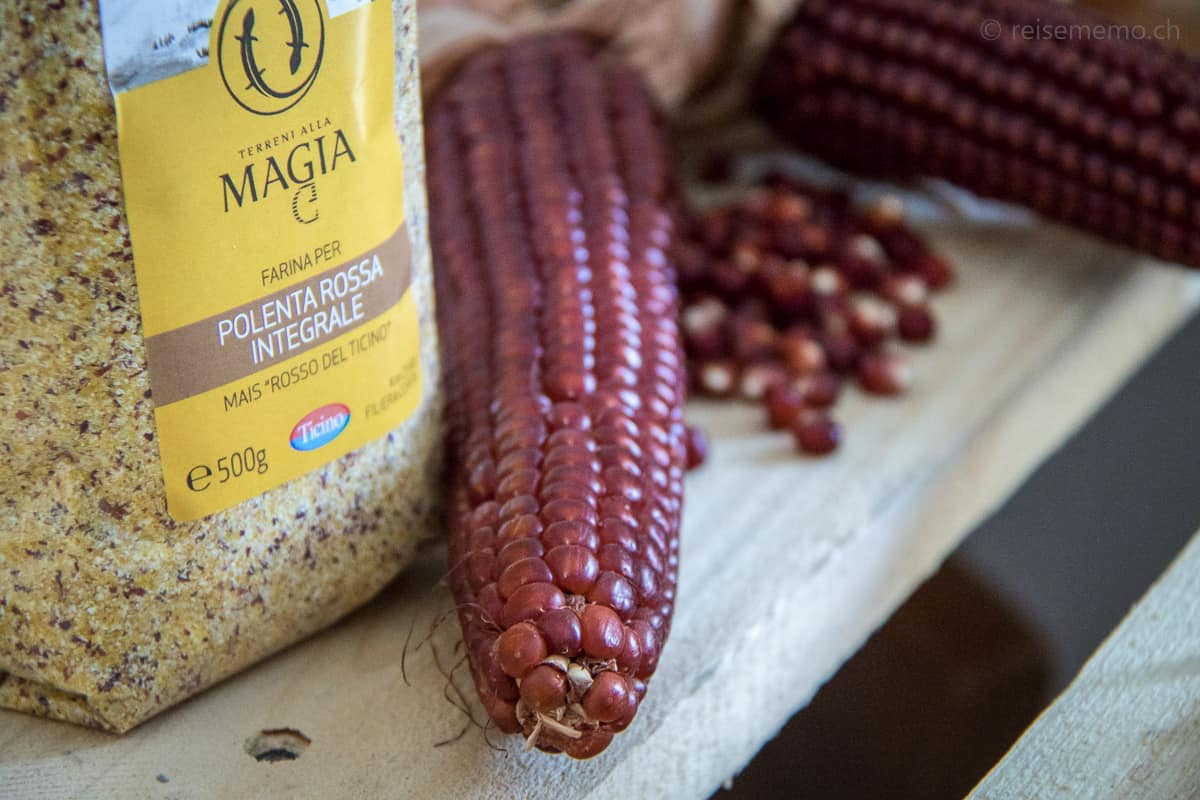
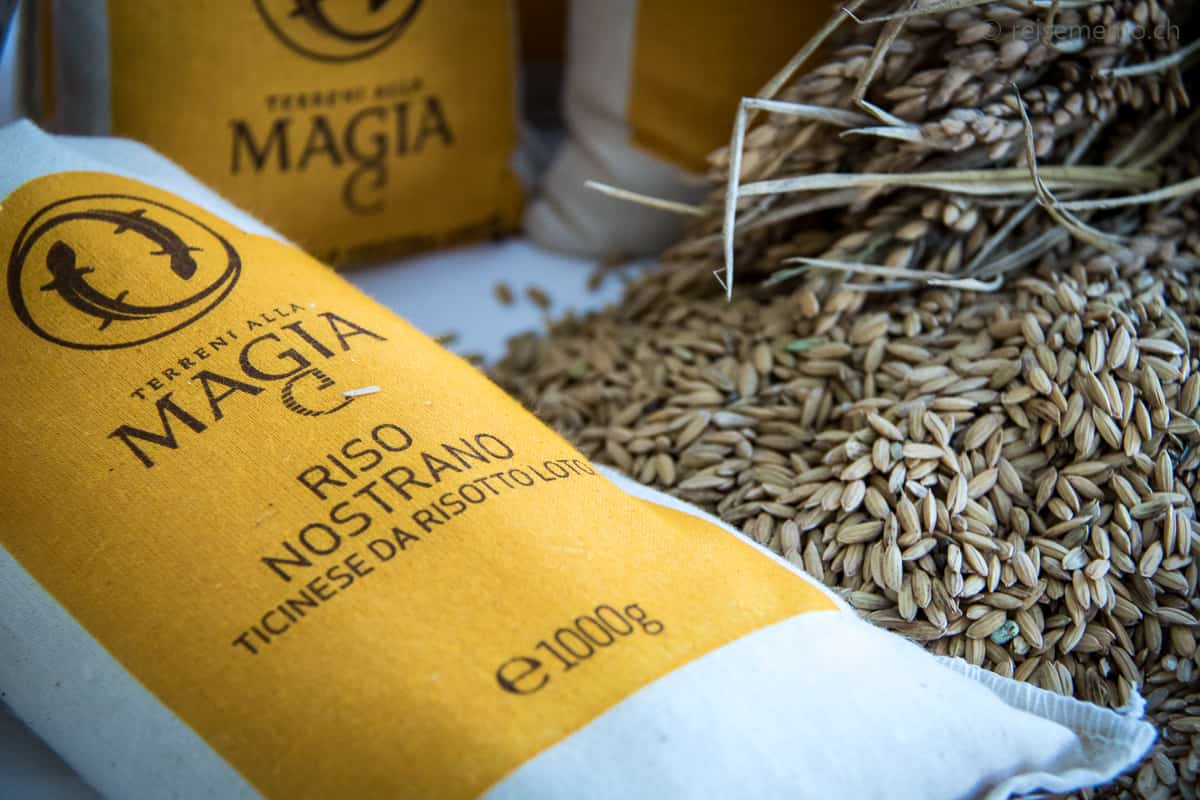
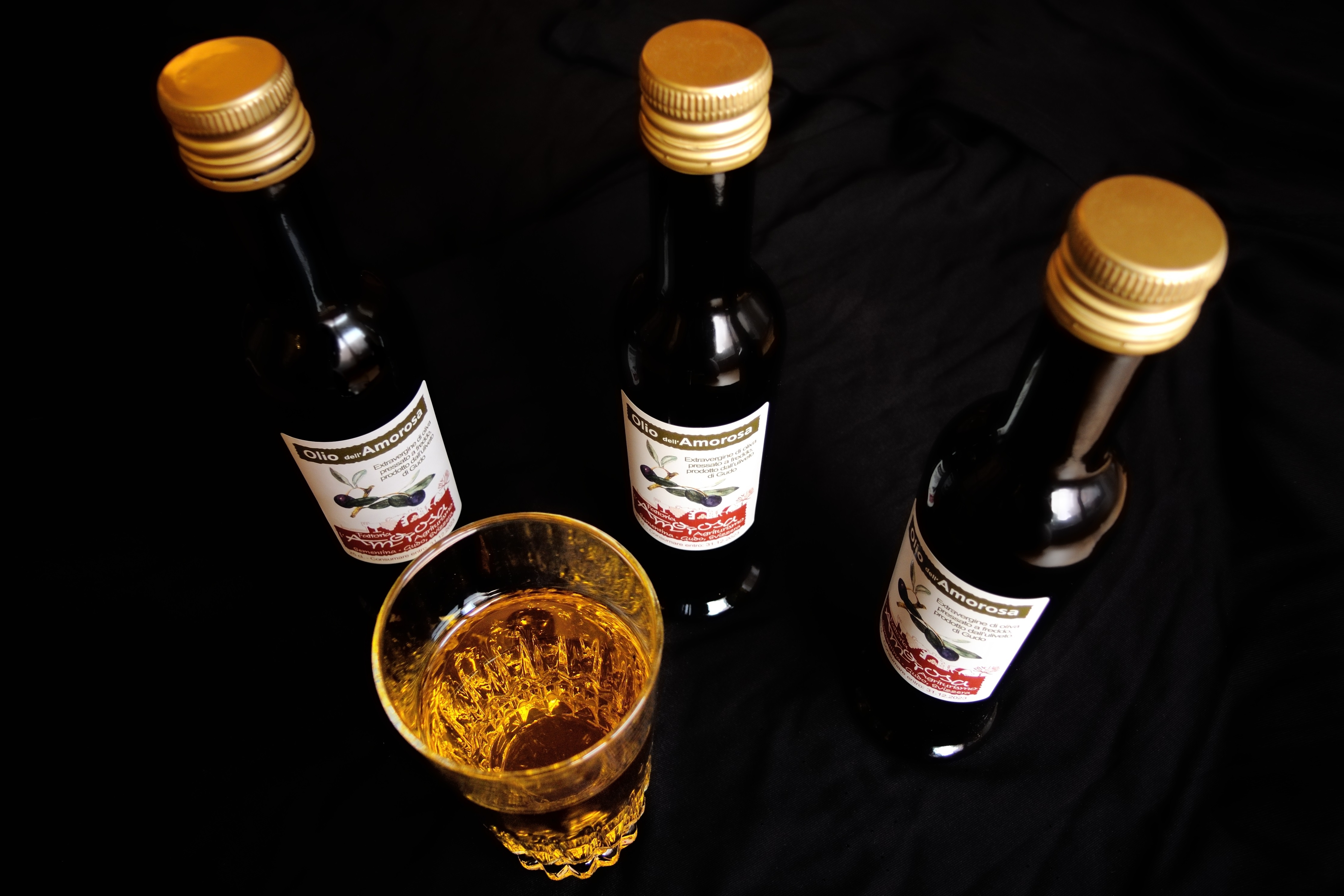
Specialities from Ticino: salami, pane ticinese, polenta, rice and olive oil

Sweet products of Ticino notably include the torta di pane, a cake made with stale bread softened in milk and containing dried and candied fruits, and Panettone, a yeast-leavened bread containing candied fruits. Gazzosa ticinese, a soft drink available in lemon and a number of other flavours, is one of the most popular beverages from Ticino, and is also common in other regions of Switzerland. It usually comes in flip-top bottles. The estimate for the production of gazzosa in Ticino is 7–8 million bottles a year. Food and wine were historically conserved in grottos, which were ubiquitous stone structures built in shadowy and fresh areas. They have become rustic, family-run open-air restaurants in the latter part of the 20th century. They serve traditional food and local wine (usually Merlot or similar), often in a little ceramic jug known as boccalino, which is also a popular souvenir for tourists.

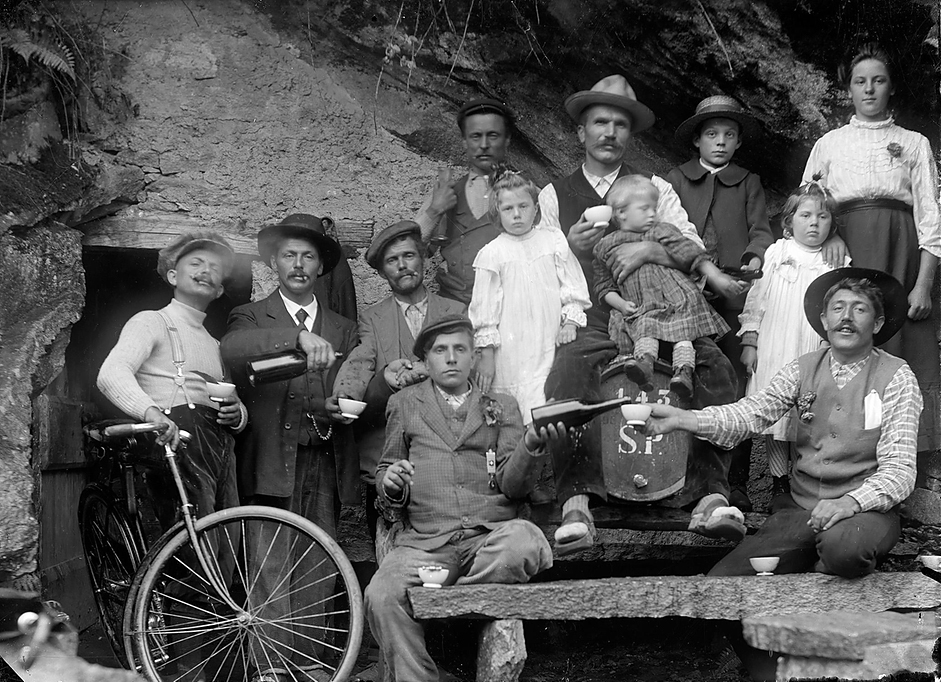
A group of people drinking wine from tazzini in Valle di Blenio (early 20th century)

Bruscitti, originating from Alto Milanese, are common in the whole Insubria area. This is a braised meat dish cut very thinly and cooked in wine and fennel seeds, historically obtained by stripping leftover meat. It is particularly popular in the province of Varese (Lombardy), in the Alto Milanese area (Lombardy; particularly in the area of the city of Busto Arsizio, where it originates), in the province of Verbano-Cusio-Ossola (Piedmont) and in lower Ticino.

== Notable people ==
- The Bernasconi family of stuccoists, architects and sculptors
- Francesco Borromini (1599 in Bissone – 1667), architect
- Mario Botta (born 1943 in Mendrisio), a Swiss architect.
- Ignazio Cassis (born 1961 in Sessa) a Swiss physician and politician, President of the Swiss Confederation for 2022.
- Flavio Cotti (1939 in Muralto – 2020) a Swiss politician, on the Federal Council, 1986 to 1999.
- Carla Del Ponte (born 1947 in Bignasco), international jurist
- Carlo Fontana (ca.1634–1714) & Domenico Fontana (1543–1607), architects
- Ersilia Fossati (1921-1999), Swiss politician and suffrage campaigner
- Aurelio Galfetti (1936 in Biasca – 2021), a Swiss architect.
- Lara Gut-Behrami (born 1991 in Sorengo), ski racer, gold medallist at the 2022 Winter Olympics
- Michelle Hunziker (born in 1977 in Sorengo) a Swiss-Italian television presenter and former model.
- Carlo Maderno (1556 in Capolago – 1629), architect
- Giovanni Pietro Magni (1655 in Bruzella – ca.1722), stuccoist.
- Noè Ponti (born 2001 in Locarno) a Swiss swimmer, won bronze in 100m butterfly in the Tokyo 2020 Olympic Games.
- Clay Regazzoni (1939 in Mendrisio – 2006) a Swiss Formula One racing driver.
- Flora Ruchat-Roncati (1937–2012), architect
- Elly Schlein (born 1985 in Lugano), Italian politician and leader of the Democratic Party.
- Luigi Snozzi (1932 in Mendrisio – 2020), architect
- Livio Vacchini (1933 in Locarno – 2007), architect

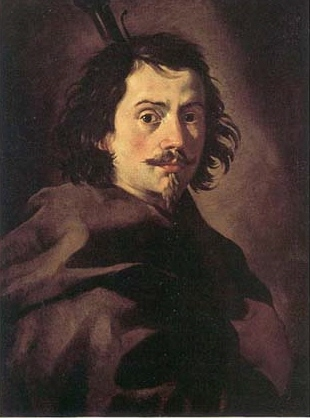
Francesco Borromini

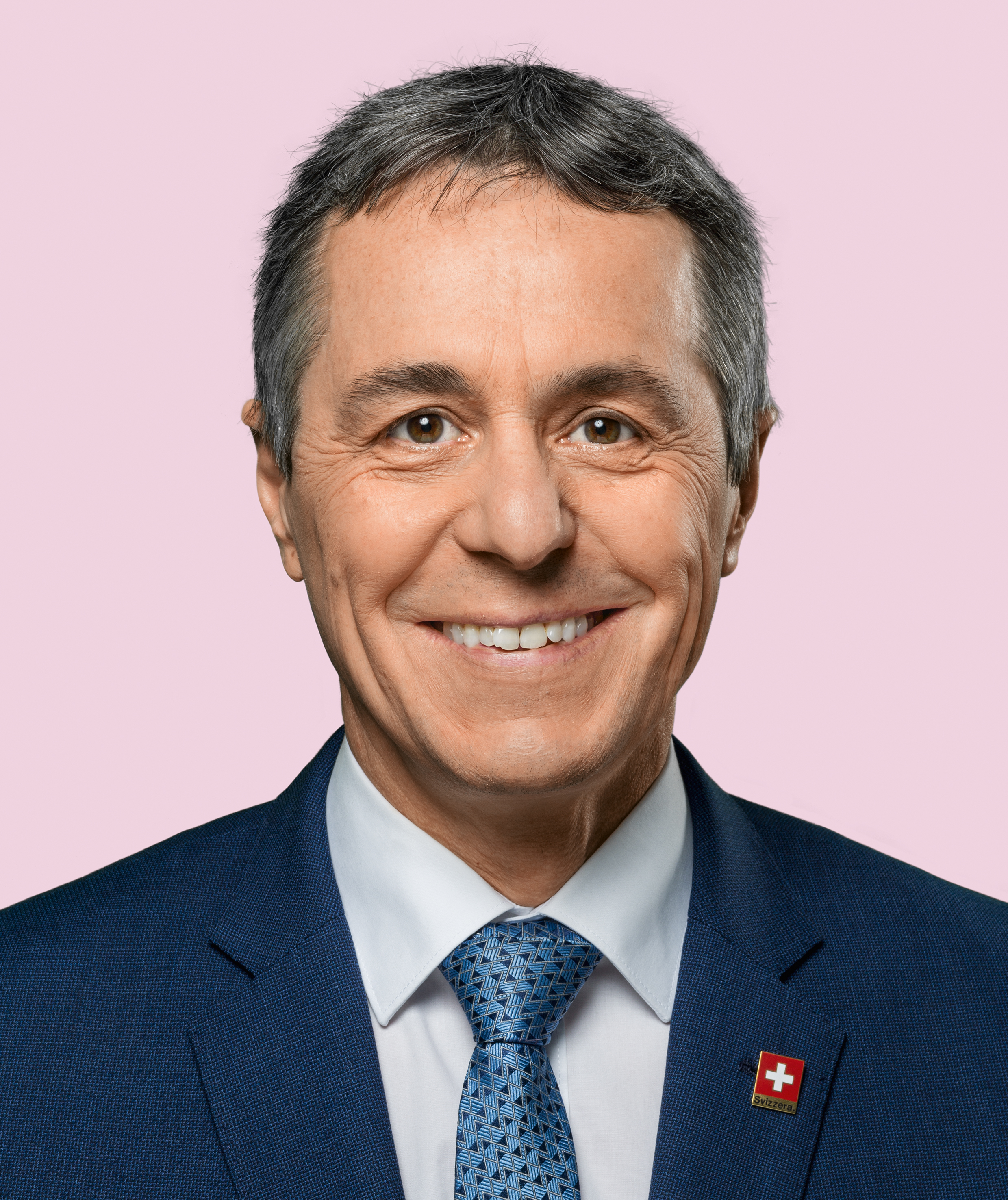
Ignazio Cassis, 2022

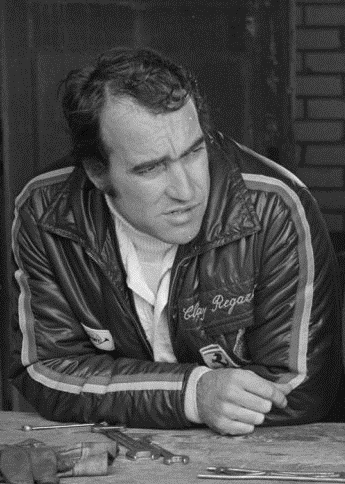
Clay Regazzoni, 1971
