= List of prominent mountains of Switzerland =

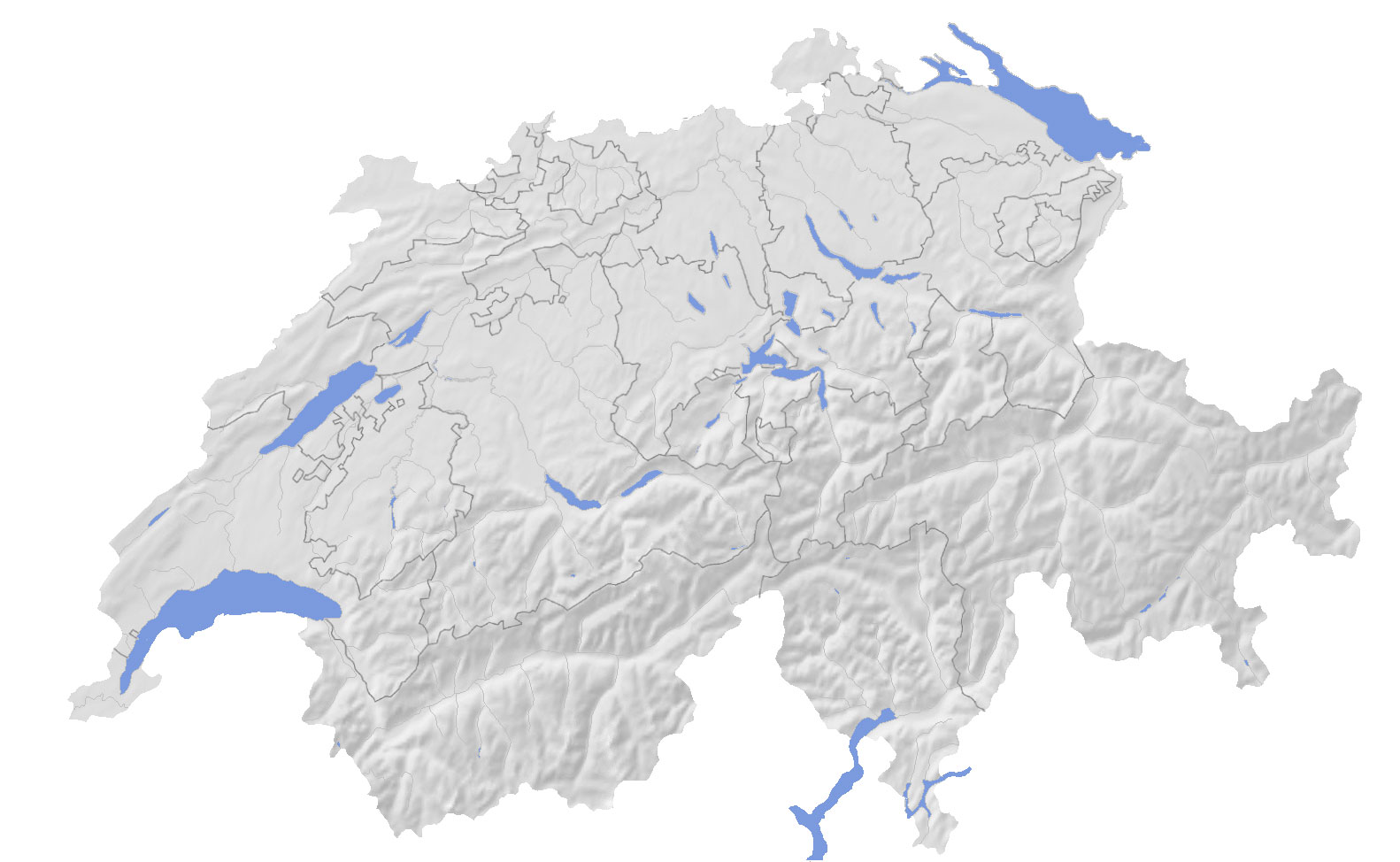

This article contains a sortable table of many of the major mountains and hills of Switzerland. The table only includes those summits that have a topographic prominence of at least 300 metres (984 ft) above other points, and ranks them by height and prominence. Therefore it only includes mountains that might generally be regarded as 'independent' and covers most of the country, even lower areas. For a fuller list of mountains, including subsidiary points, see List of mountains of Switzerland above 3000 m and List of mountains of Switzerland above 3600 m. For a list of just the most isolated mountains, see List of most isolated mountains of Switzerland.

Along with the lakes, mountains constitute a major natural feature of Switzerland with most of the cantons having summits exceeding 2,000 metres (7,000 ft) and three of them having summits exceeding 4,000 metres (13,000 ft). The two main mountain ranges are the Alps (south and east) and the Jura (north and west), separated by the Swiss Plateau which also includes a large number of hills. Topographically, the three most important summits of Switzerland are those of Monte Rosa (most elevated), the Finsteraarhorn (most prominent) and Piz Bernina (most isolated).

== Criteria ==
The International Climbing and Mountaineering Federation defines a summit in the Alps as independent, if the connecting ridge between it and a higher summit drops at least 30 m (98 ft) (a prominence/drop of 30 m, with the lowest point referred to as the "key col"). There are over 4400 such summits exceeding 2,000 m (6,560 ft) in Switzerland. In order for a peak to qualify as an independent mountain, traditionally a prominence of at least 300 m (980 ft), or 10 times the aforementioned criterion value, has been used. This is the sole criterion used for this list. Inclusion purely based on prominence is expedient for its objectivity and verifiability. It also allows the incorporation of the lowest elevation (but prominent) hills as well as the highest mountains, maximizing territory coverage and ensuring a reasonably even distribution throughout the country. However, this criterion has its drawbacks. For example, an impressive mountain peak dominating a valley may be connected via high ridges to a barely higher hidden summit. Among the better-known peaks absent from this list are Fletschhorn (due to Lagginhorn), Wetterhorn (Mittelhorn), Mont Blanc de Cheilon (Ruinette), Nadelhorn and Täschhorn (Dom), Piz Badile (Piz Cengalo) and Piz Palü (Piz Zupò). For this reason, additional country-wide lists with somewhat lower prominence cut-offs are also available: 150 m (with elevation cut-off of 3000 m) (490 and 9,800 ft and 30 m (with elevation cut-off of 3600 m) (98 and 11,800 ft).

This list does not consider nor include topographic isolation. For a list of most-isolated mountains, see List of most-isolated mountains of Switzerland.

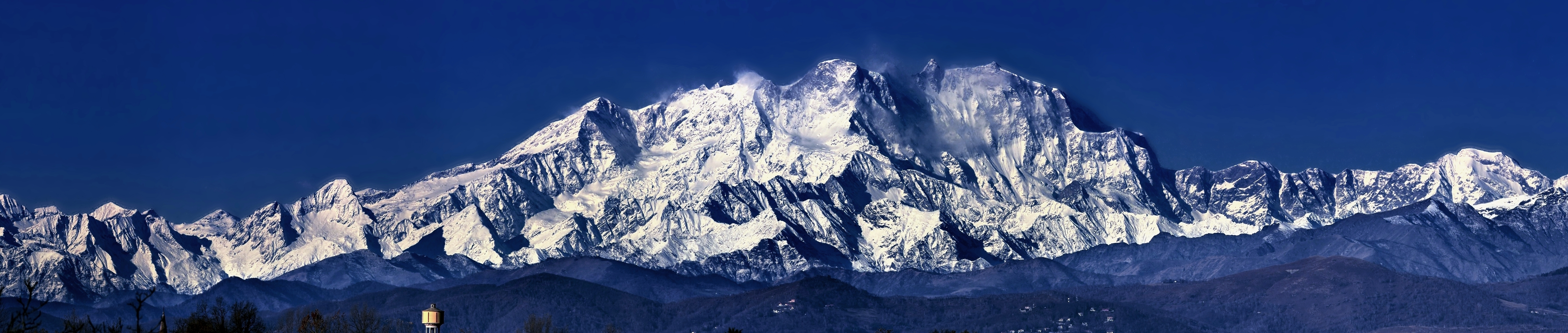
Monte Rosa, the highest mountain of Switzerland, has several subsidiary summits. Only the Dufourspitze, its main peak, is included in the list.

== Accuracy ==
All mountain heights and prominences on the list are from the largest-scale maps available. However, heights sometime conflict on different scales. For example, the Fletschhorn is indicated to be 3,993 m (13,100 ft), 3,982 m (13,064 ft), and 3,984 m (13,071 ft) high on the 1:100'000, 1:50'000 and 1:25'000 Swisstopo map, respectively. The (rounded) elevation given by the largest scale map is always used in this table. Also, the deepest points in connecting ridges are not always survey points with spot elevations, so that heights have to be estimated from contour lines. For example, maps often provide heights for the place where a route passes over a ridge rather than for the lowest point of that pass.

Finally, many height indications on these maps may be not up-to-date, while glacier and firn melt has decreased the height of both peaks and key cols, quite dramatically. For example, until 2009, the Col des Maisons Blanches which lies on the Corbassière Glacier was measured to be 3,418 m, while the more recent maps (2012) show it to be 3,404 m (11,168 ft) high. This is the key col for the Combin de Corbassière (3,716 m or 12,192 ft), which, thanks to the retreat of the glacier, now appears on the list with a prominence of 312 m (1,024 ft).

== Distribution ==
The lists below contain 451 mountains with a prominence higher than 300 m (980 ft), among which 24 are above 4,000 m (13,120 ft), 64 above 3,500 m (11,480 ft), 208 above 3,000 m (9,840 ft), 321 above 2,500 m (8,200 ft), 384 above 2,000 m (6,560 ft), 417 above 1,500 m (4,920 ft) and 443 above 1,000 m (3,280 ft). The average and median heights are respectively 2,812 and 2,956 m (9,226 and 9,698 ft). Eight summits (sometimes called ultra-prominent peaks) have a prominence exceeding 1,500 m (4,920 ft), they are found in seven cantons. The great majority of the summits are located in the Alps, the other being located in the Jura Mountains (including the Table Jura). On average, each summit is the culminating point of an area corresponding to 91.5 km^{2} (35.3 sq mi), which is equivalent in term of density to approximately 1.09 summits per 100 km^{2} (39 sq mi).

These 451 major summits are found in 22 different cantons. (Note: Out of 26 cantons. The cantons of Basel-Stadt, Geneva, Schaffhausen and Thurgau do not appear on the list.) Of these, 3 cantons (Valais, Bern and Grisons/Graubünden) have summits above 4,000 m (13,120 ft), 9 cantons have summits above 3,000 m (9,840 ft), 15 cantons have summits above 2,000 m (6,560 ft) and 21 cantons have summits above 1,000 m (3,280 ft). Two cantons have more than 100 summits: Grisons (152) and Valais (104), while eleven cantons have less than 10 summits. 82 of the summits are on cantonal borders, 2 of which being tripoints (Brienzer Rothorn and Säntis). A number of mountains (e.g. Titlis, Chasseral, Lägern) straddle borders as well, but have their summit on one side of the border. In the lists, only the exact location of the culminating point of the mountain is considered. (Note: The list excludes Aiguille du Chardonnet (France), Corno di Dosdè (Italy), Drei Türme (Austria), Mont d'Or (France), Sasso Gordona (Italy) and Sighignola (Italy) although they are all partially located in Switzerland.)

Missing from the lists below are the cantons with mountains with a prominence of less than 300 metres (980 ft), which are located either in the Upper Rhine Plain (canton of Basel-City), Swiss Plateau (cantons of Geneva and Thurgau) or Randen (canton of Schaffhausen).

=== By height ===
Distribution by height of the mountains with at least 300 m of prominence
Canton *lists of mountains	up to 999 m (3,278 ft)	1,000–1,499 m (3,281–4,918 ft)	1,500–1,999 m (4,921–6,558 ft)	2,000–2,499 m (6,562–8,199 ft)	2,500–2,999 m (8,202–9,839 ft)	3,000–3,499 m (9,843–11,480 ft)	3,500–3,999 m (11,483–13,120 ft)	4,000 m (13,000 ft)+	Total	Summits/100 km^{2} (39 sq mi)
Aargau	1	0	0	0	0	0	0	0	1	0.07
(Appenzell Ausserrhoden) Appenzell A.*	0	2	0	0	1	0	0	0	3	1.24
(Appenzell Innerrhoden) Appenzell I.*	0	1	2	1	1	0	0	0	5	2.90
(Basel-Landschaft) Basel-Country	0	2	0	0	0	0	0	0	2	0.39
(Canton of Bern) Bern*	1	7	2	18	14	11	9	5	67	1.12
Fribourg	0	1	1	7	0	0	0	0	9	0.54
(Canton of Glarus) Glarus*	0	0	1	4	6	5	1	0	17	2.48
Grisons*	0	1	0	4	46	95	5	1	152	2.14
Jura	0	1	0	0	0	0	0	0	1	0.12
Lucerne	2	3	4	3	0	0	0	0	12	0.80
Neuchâtel	0	1	0	0	0	0	0	0	1	0.12
Nidwalden*	0	1	2	3	1	0	0	0	7	2.54
Obwalden*	0	0	1	5	3	1	0	0	10	2.04
(Canton of Schwyz) Schwyz*	0	1	8	4	4	0	0	0	17	1.87
Solothurn	0	4	0	0	0	0	0	0	4	0.51
(Canton of St. Gallen) St. Gallen*	0	3	4	4	5	1	0	0	17	0.84
Ticino*	1	2	6	6	26	11	0	0	52	1.85
(Canton of Uri) Uri*	0	0	1	2	9	13	2	0	27	2.51
Valais*	0	0	0	6	15	31	30	22	104	1.99
Vaud*	0	2	5	10	3	2	0	0	22	0.68
Zug	0	0	1	0	0	0	0	0	1	0.42
Zurich	3	1	0	0	0	0	0	0	4	0.23
Switzerland	8	26	33	63	113	144	40	24	451	1.09

=== By prominence ===
Distribution of the mountains by prominence
Canton *lists of mountains	300–449 m (984–1,473 ft)	450–599 m (1,476–1,965 ft)	600–749 m (1,969–2,457 ft)	750–899 m (2,461–2,949 ft)	900–1,199 m (2,953–3,934 ft)	1,200–1,499 m (3,937–4,918 ft)	1,500 m (4,900 ft)+	Total (300 m (980 ft)+)	Km^{2}/summit
Aargau	1	0	0	0	0	0	0	1	1403.8
(Appenzell Ausserrhoden) Appenzell A.*	2	0	0	0	0	0	1	3	80.9
(Appenzell Innerrhoden) Appenzell I.*	4	0	0	0	0	0	1	5	34.5
(Basel-Landschaft) Basel-Country	2	0	0	0	0	0	0	2	258.8
(Canton of Bern) Bern*	38	14	5	4	4	1	1	67	88.9
Fribourg	3	3	1	1	1	0	0	9	185.7
(Canton of Glarus) Glarus*	7	4	4	0	1	0	1	17	40.3
Grisons*	80	28	19	9	10	3	3	152	46.7
Jura	0	1	0	0	0	0	0	1	838.5
Lucerne	6	3	1	1	0	1	0	12	124.4
Neuchâtel	1	0	0	0	0	0	0	1	802.3
Nidwalden*	2	4	1	0	0	0	0	7	39.4
Obwalden*	4	4	0	0	1	1	0	10	49.1
(Canton of Schwyz) Schwyz*	8	5	2	1	0	1	0	17	53.4
Solothurn	3	0	1	0	0	0	0	4	197.6
(Canton of St. Gallen) St. Gallen*	9	4	0	1	0	2	1	17	119.5
Ticino*	28	11	2	5	2	4	0	52	54.1
(Canton of Uri) Uri*	11	9	5	1	0	1	0	27	39.9
Valais*	53	17	10	5	13	2	4	104	50.2
Vaud*	8	8	0	2	4	0	0	22	146.0
Zug	0	0	0	1	0	0	0	1	238.7
Zurich	4	0	0	0	0	0	0	4	432.2
Switzerland	237	99	43	24	29	11	8	451	91.5

== Main list ==
Height rank	Prom. rank	Mountain	Height		Prom.		Coordinates	Range	Canton(s)	First ascent
Height rank	Prom. rank	Mountain	m	ft	m	ft	Coordinates	Range	Canton(s)	First ascent
1	3	Monte Rosa (Dufourspitze)	4,634	15,203	2,165	7,103	45°56′13″N 07°52′01″E	Pennine Alps	Valais	1855
2	29	Dom	4,546	14,915	1,057	3,468	46°05′38″N 07°51′32″E	Pennine Alps	Valais	1858
3	302	Lyskamm	4,532	14,869	379	1,243	45°55′20″N 07°50′08″E	Pennine Alps	Valais	1861
4	18	Weisshorn	4,505	14,780	1,234	4,049	46°06′05″N 07°42′57″E	Pennine Alps	Valais	1861
5	30	Matterhorn	4,478	14,692	1,043	3,422	45°58′35″N 07°39′31″E	Pennine Alps	Valais	1865
6	48	Dent Blanche	4,357	14,295	916	3,005	46°02′03″N 07°36′43″E	Pennine Alps	Valais	1862
7	7	Grand Combin	4,309	14,137	1,512	4,961	45°56′15″N 07°17′57″E	Pennine Alps	Valais	1859
8	1	Finsteraarhorn	4,274	14,022	2,279	7,477	46°32′14″N 08°07′34″E	Bernese Alps	Bern/Valais	1829
9	177	Zinalrothorn	4,221	13,848	491	1,611	46°03′54″N 07°41′25″E	Pennine Alps	Valais	1864
10	331	Alphubel	4,206	13,799	359	1,178	46°03′47″N 07°51′50″E	Pennine Alps	Valais	1860
11	98	Rimpfischhorn	4,199	13,776	647	2,123	46°01′24″N 07°53′03″E	Pennine Alps	Valais	1859
12	31	Aletschhorn	4,194	13,760	1,043	3,422	46°27′54″N 07°59′38″E	Bernese Alps	Valais	1859
13	270	Strahlhorn	4,190	13,750	404	1,325	46°00′48″N 07°54′06″E	Pennine Alps	Valais	1854
14	85	Dent d'Hérens	4,173	13,691	704	2,310	45°58′12″N 07°36′19″E	Pennine Alps	Valais	1863
15	228	Breithorn	4,160	13,650	438	1,437	45°56′28″N 07°44′56″E	Pennine Alps	Valais	1813
16	87	Jungfrau	4,158	13,642	694	2,277	46°32′12″N 07°57′45″E	Bernese Alps	Bern/Valais	1811
17	123	Mönch	4,110	13,480	591	1,939	46°33′30″N 07°59′50″E	Bernese Alps	Bern/Valais	1857
18	63	Schreckhorn	4,078	13,379	795	2,608	46°35′24″N 08°07′05″E	Bernese Alps	Bern	1861
19	148	Ober Gabelhorn	4,063	13,330	536	1,759	46°02′19″N 07°40′05″E	Pennine Alps	Valais	1865
20	274	Gross Fiescherhorn	4,049	13,284	396	1,299	46°33′05″N 08°03′41″E	Bernese Alps	Bern/Valais	1862
21	2	Piz Bernina	4,048	13,281	2,236	7,336	46°22′56″N 09°54′29″E	Bernina Range	Graubünden	1850
22	436	Gross Grünhorn	4,043	13,264	303	994	46°31′55″N 08°04′40″E	Bernese Alps	Valais	1865
23	20	Weissmies	4,013	13,166	1,183	3,881	46°07′40″N 08°00′44″E	Pennine Alps	Valais	1855
24	165	Lagginhorn	4,010	13,160	512	1,680	46°09′26″N 08°00′11″E	Pennine Alps	Valais	1856
25	267	Piz Zupò	3,995	13,107	414	1,358	46°22′06″N 09°55′53″E	Bernina Range	Graubünden	1863
		Fletschhorn	3,985	13,074	300	980	46°10′05″N 08°00′12″E	Pennine Alps	Valais	1854
26	352	Gletscherhorn	3,982	13,064	355	1,165	46°30′46″N 07°58′04″E	Bernese Alps	Bern/Valais	1867
27	338	Eiger	3,967	13,015	361	1,184	46°34′39″N 08°00′19″E	Bernese Alps	Bern	1858
28	236	Grand Cornier	3,962	12,999	431	1,414	46°03′07″N 07°36′41″E	Pennine Alps	Valais	1865
29	250	Piz Roseg	3,935	12,910	417	1,368	46°22′25″N 09°52′59″E	Bernina Range	Graubünden	1865
30	62	Bietschhorn	3,934	12,907	807	2,648	46°23′30″N 07°51′03″E	Bernese Alps	Valais	1859
31	433	Trugberg	3,932	12,900	308	1,010	46°32′48″N 08°00′55″E	Bernese Alps	Valais	1871
32	104	Gross Wannenhorn	3,906	12,815	636	2,087	46°29′38″N 08°05′49″E	Bernese Alps	Valais	1864
33	192	Aiguille d'Argentière	3,898	12,789	470	1,540	45°57′36″N 07°01′12″E	Mont Blanc massif	Valais	1864
34	53	Ruinette	3,875	12,713	860	2,820	45°58′45″N 07°24′01″E	Pennine Alps	Valais	1865
35	178	Bouquetins	3,838	12,592	490	1,610	45°58′56″N 07°32′43″E	Pennine Alps	Valais	1871
36	441	Tour Noir	3,837	12,589	302	991	45°56′56″N 07°02′15″E	Mont Blanc massif	Valais	1876
		Brunegghorn	3,831	12,569	304	997	46°07′33″N 07°44′44″E	Pennine Alps	Valais	1865
37	100	Nesthorn	3,820	12,530	658	2,159	46°24′48″N 07°55′34″E	Bernese Alps	Valais	1865
38	378	Mont Dolent	3,820	12,530	330	1,080	45°55′21″N 07°02′46″E	Mont Blanc massif	Valais	1864
39	245	Schinhorn	3,796	12,454	422	1,385	46°27′06″N 07°56′48″E	Bernese Alps	Valais	1869
40	445	Pointe de Zinal	3,789	12,431	301	988	46°01′37″N 07°37′50″E	Pennine Alps	Valais	1870
41	225	Breithorn (Lauterbrunnen)	3,780	12,400	464	1,522	46°28′43″N 07°52′36″E	Bernese Alps	Bern/Valais	1865
42	393	Piz Morteratsch	3,751	12,306	324	1,063	46°24′10″N 09°54′06″E	Bernina Range	Graubünden	1858
43	105	Mont Vélan	3,726	12,224	620	2,030	45°53′30″N 07°15′06″E	Pennine Alps	Valais	1779
44	96	Evêque	3,716	12,192	647	2,123	45°57′52″N 07°30′10″E	Pennine Alps	Valais	1867
45	415	Combin de Corbassière	3,716	12,192	312	1,024	45°58′41″N 07°16′50″E	Pennine Alps	Valais	1851
46	211	La Singla	3,714	12,185	452	1,483	45°56′45″N 07°28′19″E	Pennine Alps	Valais	1867
47	125	Wetterhörner (Mittelhorn)	3,702	12,146	578	1,896	46°38′07″N 08°07′29″E	Bernese Alps	Bern	1845
48	198	Le Pleureur	3,704	12,152	467	1,532	46°00′59″N 07°22′09″E	Pennine Alps	Valais	1867
49	34	Balmhorn	3,697	12,129	1,020	3,350	46°25′30″N 07°41′37″E	Bernese Alps	Bern/Valais	1864
50	260	Dent de Perroc	3,676	12,060	408	1,339	46°02′22″N 07°31′23″E	Pennine Alps	Valais	1871
51	51	Blüemlisalp(horn)	3,660	12,010	896	2,940	46°29′20″N 07°46′21″E	Bernese Alps	Bern	1860
52	258	Portjengrat (Pizzo d'Andolla)	3,654	11,988	411	1,348	46°06′03″N 08°02′05″E	Pennine Alps	Valais	1871
53	65	Aiguilles Rouges d'Arolla	3,644	11,955	789	2,589	46°03′19″N 07°26′01″E	Pennine Alps	Valais	1870
54	95	Doldenhorn	3,638	11,936	655	2,149	46°28′08″N 07°44′05″E	Bernese Alps	Bern	1862
55	9	Dammastock	3,630	11,910	1,466	4,810	46°38′36″N 08°25′16″E	Uri Alps	Uri/Valais	1864
56	6	Tödi (Piz Russein)	3,614	11,857	1,570	5,150	46°48′40″N 08°54′53″E	Glarus Alps	Glarus/Graubünden	1824
57	297	Les Diablons	3,609	11,841	379	1,243	46°08′33″N 07°40′16″E	Pennine Alps	Valais	1863
58	365	Piz Glüschaint	3,594	11,791	341	1,119	46°21′45″N 09°50′24″E	Bernina Range	Graubünden	1863
59	322	Mont Brulé	3,578	11,739	365	1,198	45°57′18″N 07°32′18″E	Pennine Alps	Valais	1876
60	284	Tschingelhorn	3,555	11,663	389	1,276	46°28′43″N 07°50′55″E	Bernese Alps	Bern/Valais	1865
61	355	Aouille Tseuque	3,554	11,660	345	1,132	45°55′49″N 07°26′35″E	Pennine Alps	Valais	
62	22	Monte Leone	3,553	11,657	144	472	46°14′58″N 08°06′36″E	Lepontine Alps	Valais	1859
63	107	Mont Gelé	3,518	11,542	619	2,031	45°54′15″N 07°21′58″E	Pennine Alps	Valais	1861
		Vorderes Galmihorn	3,507	11,506	302	991	46°30′24″N 08°11′06″E	Bernese Alps	Valais	1884
64	251	Sustenhorn	3,503	11,493	414	1,358	46°41′56″N 08°27′19″E	Uri Alps	Bern/Uri	1841
65	367	Sonnighorn/Pizzo Bottarello	3,487	11,440	340	1,120	46°04′27″N 08°01′20″E	Pennine Alps	Valais	1879
66	292	Piz Corvatsch	3,451	11,322	383	1,257	46°24′30″N 09°48′58″E	Bernina Range	Graubünden	1850
67	257	Rinderhorn	3,449	11,316	414	1,358	46°24′49″N 07°39′15″E	Bernese Alps	Valais	1854
68	439	Wasenhorn	3,447	11,309	303	994	46°29′53″N 08°09′57″E	Bernese Alps	Valais	1885
69	350	Piz Tremoggia	3,441	11,289	349	1,145	46°21′07″N 09°49′19″E	Bernina Range	Graubünden	1859
70	116	Gspaltenhorn	3,436	11,273	600	2,000	46°30′42″N 07°49′39″E	Bernese Alps	Bern	1869
71	117	Stellihorn	3,436	11,273	598	1,962	46°02′11″N 08°00′03″E	Pennine Alps	Valais	
72	293	Bifertenstock/Piz Durschin	3,419	11,217	383	1,257	46°48′16″N 08°57′27″E	Glarus Alps	Glarus/Graubünden	1863
73	8	Piz Kesch/Piz d'Es-Cha	3,418	11,214	503	1,650	46°37′17″N 09°52′22″E	Albula Alps	Graubünden	1846
74	69	Fleckistock/Rot Stock	3,416	11,207	760	2,490	46°42′27″N 08°29′51″E	Uri Alps	Uri	1864
75	32	Piz Linard	3,411	11,191	1,028	3,373	46°47′56″N 10°04′18″E	Silvretta Alps	Graubünden	1835
76	15	Rheinwaldhorn	3,402	11,161	1,337	4,386	46°29′37″N 09°02′25″E	Lepontine Alps	Graubünden/Ticino	1789
77	97	Fluchthorn	3,399	11,152	647	2,123	46°53′27″N 10°13′39″E	Silvretta Alps	Graubünden	1861
78	26	Piz Calderas	3,397	11,145	1,085	3,560	46°32′11″N 09°41′45″E	Albula Alps	Graubünden	1857
79	24	Piz Platta	3,392	11,129	1,108	3,635	46°29′14″N 09°33′42″E	Oberhalbstein Alps	Graubünden	1866
80	429	Diechterhorn	3,389	11,119	308	1,010	46°38′55″N 08°21′38″E	Uri Alps	Bern	1864
81	180	Piz Julier/Piz Güglia	3,380	11,090	489	1,604	46°29′28″N 09°45′35″E	Albula Alps	Graubünden	1859
82	271	Güferhorn	3,379	11,086	400	1,300	46°30′45″N 09°03′47″E	Lepontine Alps	Graubünden	1806
83	285	Cima di Castello	3,379	11,086	388	1,273	46°18′11″N 09°40′37″E	Bregaglia Range	Graubünden	1866
84	45	Blinnenhorn/Corno Cieco	3,374	11,070	945	3,100	46°25′33″N 08°18′28″E	Lepontine Alps	Valais	1866
85	106	Pizzo Cengalo	3,369	11,053	620	2,030	46°17′42″N 09°36′07″E	Bregaglia Range	Graubünden	1866
86	298	Egginer	3,367	11,047	378	1,240	46°04′31″N 07°55′48″E	Pennine Alps	Valais	
87	234	Piz Fora	3,363	11,033	432	1,417	46°20′27″N 09°47′05″E	Bernina Range	Graubünden	1875
88	162	Piz Ela	3,339	10,955	515	1,690	46°36′07″N 09°42′27″E	Albula Alps	Graubünden	1865
89	261	Mont Fort	3,329	10,922	408	1,339	46°04′52″N 07°19′07″E	Pennine Alps	Valais	1866
90	83	Oberalpstock/Piz Tgietschen	3,328	10,919	703	2,306	46°44′34″N 08°46′10″E	Glarus Alps	Graubünden/Uri	1793
91	143	Piz Buin	3,312	10,866	544	1,785	46°50′39″N 10°07′07″E	Silvretta Alps	Graubünden	1865
92	50	Piz Paradisin	3,302	10,833	875	2,871	46°25′34″N 10°07′02″E	Livigno Alps	Graubünden	
93	303	Verstanclahorn	3,298	10,820	375	1,230	46°50′06″N 10°04′21″E	Silvretta Alps	Graubünden	1866
94	163	Gross Schärhorn	3,294	10,807	513	1,683	46°49′38″N 08°49′45″E	Glarus Alps	Uri	1842
95	84	Muttler	3,293	10,804	703	2,306	46°54′02″N 10°22′43″E	Samnaun Alps	Graubünden	1859
96	351	Hockenhorn	3,293	10,804	350	1,150	46°25′42″N 07°44′39″E	Bernese Alps	Bern/Valais	1840
97	379	Ritzlihorn	3,277	10,751	322	1,056	46°37′56″N 08°15′32″E	Bernese Alps	Bern	1816
98	264	Piz Fliana	3,281	10,764	406	1,332	46°49′38″N 10°06′31″E	Silvretta Alps	Graubünden	1869
99	21	Pizzo Tambo/Tambohorn	3,279	10,758	164	538	46°29′49″N 09°17′00″E	Lepontine Alps	Graubünden	1828
100	42	Basòdino	3,272	10,735	959	3,146	46°24′41″N 08°28′07″E	Lepontine Alps	Ticino	1863
101	121	Helsenhorn	3,272	10,735	586	1,923	46°18′17″N 08°11′30″E	Lepontine Alps	Valais	1863
102	253	Clariden	3,267	10,719	413	1,355	46°50′31″N 08°52′17″E	Glarus Alps	Glarus/Uri	1863
103	276	Piz Üertsch	3,267	10,719	396	1,299	46°35′47″N 09°50′11″E	Albula Alps	Graubünden	1847
104	227	Scima da Saoseo	3,264	10,709	440	1,440	46°23′08″N 10°09′29″E	Livigno Alps	Graubünden	1894
105	44	Piz Languard	3,262	10,702	947	3,107	46°29′18″N 09°57′23″E	Livigno Alps	Graubünden	1846
106	113	Piz Forbesch	3,262	10,702	601	1,972	46°31′13″N 09°33′33″E	Oberhalbstein Alps	Graubünden	1893
107	5	Dents du Midi (Haute Cime)	3,257	10,686	1,796	5,892	46°09′40″N 06°55′24″E	Chablais Alps	Valais	1784
108	238	Gross Düssi/Piz Git	3,256	10,682	429	1,407	46°47′30″N 08°49′39″E	Glarus Alps	Graubünden/Uri	1841
109	265	Piz Tschütta/Stammerspitz	3,254	10,676	406	1,332	46°54′13″N 10°20′35″E	Samnaun Alps	Graubünden	1884
110	288	Sasseneire	3,254	10,676	386	1,266	46°08′19″N 07°31′31″E	Pennine Alps	Valais	1835
111	218	Cavistrau/Brigelser Hörner	3,252	10,669	448	1,470	46°47′04″N 08°58′26″E	Glarus Alps	Graubünden	1865
112	37	Wildhorn	3,250	10,660	981	3,219	46°21′21″N 07°21′44″E	Bernese Alps	Bern/Valais	1843
113	56	Ringelspitz/Piz Barghis	3,247	10,653	843	2,766	46°53′54″N 09°20′35″E	Glarus Alps	Graubünden/St. Gallen	1865
114	102	Piz Ot	3,246	10,650	631	2,070	46°32′36″N 09°48′37″E	Albula Alps	Graubünden	1830
115	189	Wasenhorn / Punta Terrarossa	3,246	10,650	476	1,562	46°15′59″N 08°05′08″E	Lepontine Alps	Valais	1844
116	329	Platthorn	3,246	10,650	361	1,184	46°09′59″N 07°51′40″E	Pennine Alps	Valais	
117	434	Piz Bacun	3,244	10,643	306	1,004	46°20′32″N 09°40′56″E	Bregaglia Range	Graubünden	1883
118	61	Wildstrubel	3,244	10,643	816	2,677	46°24′01″N 07°31′43″E	Bernese Alps	Bern/Valais	1855
119	38	Titlis	3,238	10,623	978	3,209	46°46′19″N 08°26′16″E	Uri Alps	Bern/Obwalden	1739
120	409	Grand Golliat	3,238	10,623	313	1,027	45°51′33″N 07°06′06″E	Pennine Alps	Valais	1879
121	372	Ofenhorn / Punta d'Arbola	3,235	10,614	334	1,096	46°23′12″N 08°19′07″E	Lepontine Alps	Valais	1864
122	235	Augstenberg/Piz Blaisch Lunga	3,230	10,600	432	1,417	46°51′52″N 10°12′14″E	Silvretta Alps	Graubünden	1881
123	93	Piz Vadret	3,229	10,594	660	2,170	46°41′13″N 09°57′46″E	Albula Alps	Graubünden	1867
124	78	Tour Sallière	3,220	10,560	726	2,382	46°07′37″N 06°55′29″E	Chablais Alps	Valais	1858
125	449	Vorderes Plattenhorn (Ostgipfel)	3,220	10,560	300	980	46°48′36″N 10°01′59″E	Silvretta Alps	Graubünden	1868
126	440	Vogelberg	3,218	10,558	303	994	46°28′42″N 09°03′55″E	Lepontine Alps	Graubünden/Ticino	1864
127	39	Diablerets	3,216	10,551	974	3,196	46°18′14″N 07°11′20″E	Vaud Alps	Valais/Vaud	1850
128	220	Monte del Forno	3,214	10,545	446	1,463	46°20′18″N 09°43′29″E	Bregaglia Range	Graubünden	1876
129	442	Le Métailler	3,213	10,541	302	991	46°06′14″N 07°21′37″E	Pennine Alps	Valais	
130	43	Piz Medel	3,211	10,535	952	3,123	46°37′06″N 08°54′40″E	Lepontine Alps	Graubünden/Ticino	1865
131	82	Scherbadung / Pizzo Cervandone	3,211	10,535	716	2,349	46°19′27″N 08°13′23″E	Lepontine Alps	Valais	1886
132	59	Piz Timun /Pizzo d'Emet	3,209	10,528	823	2,700	46°28′01″N 09°24′34″E	Oberhalbstein Alps	Graubünden	1884
133	325	Piz Cambrialas	3,208	10,525	364	1,194	46°47′22″N 08°51′07″E	Glarus Alps	Graubünden	1905
134	28	Piz Sesvenna	3,204	10,512	1,055	3,461	46°42′21″N 10°24′10″E	Sesvenna Range	Graubünden	
135	430	Schwarzhorn	3,201	10,502	308	1,010	46°13′00″N 07°45′24″E	Pennine Alps	Valais	
136	431	Piz Vadret	3,199	10,495	308	1,010	46°30′32″N 09°57′03″E	Livigno Alps	Graubünden	
137	109	Gross Spannort	3,198	10,492	616	2,021	46°47′12″N 08°31′28″E	Uri Alps	Uri	1867
138	435	Dreiländerspitze	3,197	10,489	306	1,004	46°51′03″N 10°08′41″E	Silvretta Alps	Graubünden	1853
139	237	Bortelhorn/ Punta del Rebbio	3,194	10,479	430	1,410	46°17′41″N 08°07′31″E	Lepontine Alps	Valais	1869
140	72	Pizzo Rotondo	3,192	10,472	752	2,467	46°31′03″N 08°27′58″E	Lepontine Alps	Ticino/Valais	1869
141	389	Hübschhorn I	3,192	10,472	325	1,066	46°14′13″N 08°03′19″E	Lepontine Alps	Valais	
142	64	Scopi	3,190	10,470	792	2,598	46°34′18″N 08°49′48″E	Lepontine Alps	Graubünden/Ticino	1782
143	339	Spechhorn / Pizzo d'Antigine	3,189	10,463	355	1,165	46°00′44″N 08°00′04″E	Pennine Alps	Valais	
144	232	Piz Surlej	3,188	10,459	433	1,421	46°27′12″N 09°50′35″E	Bernina Range	Graubünden	1846
145	141	Gross Windgällen	3,187	10,456	552	1,811	46°48′26″N 08°43′56″E	Glarus Alps	Uri	1848
146	89	Piz Murtaröl	3,180	10,430	679	2,228	46°34′13″N 10°17′15″E	Ortler Alps	Graubünden	1893
147	312	Piz Tasna	3,179	10,430	371	1,217	46°51′33″N 10°15′08″E	Silvretta Alps	Graubünden	1849
148	47	Piz Pisoc	3,173	10,410	922	3,025	46°44′40″N 10°16′46″E	Sesvenna Range	Graubünden	1865
149	191	Corn da Tinizong /Tinzenhorn	3,173	10,410	474	1,555	46°36′42″N 09°40′16″E	Albula Alps	Graubünden	1866
150	54	Piz Tavrü	3,168	10,394	851	2,792	46°40′45″N 10°17′46″E	Sesvenna Range	Graubünden	1893
151	199	Piz Vial	3,168	10,394	465	1,526	46°37′55″N 08°58′09″E	Lepontine Alps	Graubünden	1873
152	179	Piz Plavna Dadaint	3,167	10,390	490	1,610	46°42′31″N 10°13′25″E	Sesvenna Range	Graubünden	1891
153	402	Piz Albris	3,166	10,387	318	1,043	46°27′51″N 09°57′48″E	Livigno Alps	Graubünden	
154	52	Piz Lagrev	3,165	10,384	855	2,805	46°26′45″N 09°43′22″E	Albula Alps	Graubünden	1875
155	194	Piz Quattervals	3,165	10,384	471	1,545	46°37′38″N 10°05′42″E	Livigno Alps	Graubünden	1848
156	222	Piz Mitgel	3,159	10,364	445	1,460	46°36′51″N 09°38′48″E	Albula Alps	Graubünden	1867
157	94	Hausstock	3,158	10,361	655	2,149	46°52′28″N 09°03′56″E	Glarus Alps	Glarus/Graubünden	1832
158	403	Piz Prüna	3,153	10,344	317	1,040	46°29′14″N 09°59′14″E	Livigno Alps	Graubünden	
159	283	Piz Terri	3,149	10,331	390	1,280	46°36′00″N 09°02′03″E	Lepontine Alps	Graubünden/Ticino	1802
160	328	Becs de Bosson	3,149	10,331	362	1,188	46°10′04″N 07°31′05″E	Pennine Alps	Valais	
161	110	Flüela Schwarzhorn	3,146	10,322	609	1,998	46°44′09″N 09°56′30″E	Albula Alps	Graubünden	1835
162	363	Piz Mundin	3,146	10,322	342	1,122	46°55′31″N 10°25′51″E	Samnaun Alps	Graubünden	1849
163	400	Piz Tea Fondada/Monte Cornaccia	3,144	10,315	319	1,047	46°32′58″N 10°18′29″E	Ortler Alps	Graubünden	1883
164	275	Gross Ruchen	3,138	10,295	397	1,302	46°48′37″N 08°46′29″E	Glarus Alps	Uri	1864
165	169	Hinter Schloss	3,133	10,279	506	1,660	46°48′09″N 08°31′37″E	Uri Alps	Uri	1863
166	184	Piz Duan	3,131	10,272	482	1,581	46°22′31″N 09°35′00″E	Oberhalbstein Alps	Graubünden	1859
167	405	Piz Schumbraida	3,125	10,253	315	1,033	46°32′34″N 10°20′18″E	Ortler Alps	Graubünden	1883
168	446	Fanellhorn	3,124	10,249	301	988	46°32′52″N 09°07′50″E	Lepontine Alps	Graubünden	1859
169	149	Piz Nuna	3,123	10,246	535	1,755	46°43′24″N 10°09′16″E	Sesvenna Range	Graubünden	1886
		Oldenhorn	3,123	10,246	307	1,007	46°19′45″N 07°13′18″E	Vaud Alps	Bern/Val./Vaud	1835
170	231	Gross Seehorn	3,122	10,243	434	1,424	46°53′16″N 10°01′57″E	Silvretta Alps	Graubünden	1869
171	278	Piz Aul	3,121	10,240	395	1,296	46°37′22″N 09°07′30″E	Lepontine Alps	Graubünden	1801
172	425	Piz da l'Acqua	3,118	10,230	310	1,020	46°36′40″N 10°08′20″E	Livigno Alps	Graubünden	1888
173	380	Krönten	3,108	10,197	330	1,080	46°46′56″N 08°34′10″E	Uri Alps	Uri	1868
174	254	Gletscherhorn (Note: The lowest col between equally high Gletscherhorn and Piz Gallagiun is the 383 m deep Passo de la Prasgnola. They share the 2694 m key col Pass da la Duana.)	3,107	10,194	413	1,355	46°23′15″N 09°33′38″E	Oberhalbstein Alps	Graubünden	1849
175	255	Pizz Gallagiun/Galleggione	3,107	10,194	413	1,355	46°22′01″N 09°29′16″E	Oberhalbstein Alps	Graubünden	1861
176	307	Piz la Stretta / Monte Breva	3,104	10,184	314	1,030	46°28′36″N 10°02′41″E	Livigno Alps	Graubünden	
177	111	Piz Segnas	3,099	10,167	607	1,991	46°54′28″N 09°14′23″E	Glarus Alps	Glarus/Graubünden	1861
178	73	Piz Giuv / Schattig Wichel	3,096	10,157	749	2,457	46°42′07″N 08°41′33″E	Glarus Alps	Graubünden/Uri	1804
179	101	Flüela Wisshorn	3,085	10,121	632	2,073	46°45′44″N 09°58′00″E	Silvretta Alps	Graubünden	1880
180	246	Cima da Lägh /Cima di Lago	3,083	10,115	422	1,385	46°22′35″N 09°27′40″E	Oberhalbstein Alps	Graubünden	
181	193	Chüealphorn	3,078	10,098	472	1,549	46°41′07″N 09°54′19″E	Albula Alps	Graubünden	1877
182	67	Piz Starlex	3,075	10,089	779	2,556	46°39′46″N 10°23′33″E	Sesvenna Range	Graubünden	
183	358	Piz Sena	3,075	10,089	344	1,129	46°21′11″N 10°06′36″E	Livigno Alps	Graubünden	1901
184	131	Bristen	3,073	10,082	567	1,860	46°44′13″N 08°40′52″E	Glarus Alps	Uri	1823
185	71	Pizzo Campo Tencia	3,072	10,079	754	2,474	46°25′47″N 08°43′34″E	Lepontine Alps	Ticino	1867
186	404	Chüebodenhorn	3,070	10,070	316	1,037	46°30′29″N 08°27′11″E	Lepontine Alps	Ticino/Valais	
187	394	Hoch Ducan	3,063	10,049	324	1,063	46°41′22″N 09°51′05″E	Albula Alps	Graubünden	1845
188	416	Geltenhorn	3,062	10,046	305	1,001	46°20′47″N 07°20′04″E	Bernese Alps	Bern/Valais	
189	299	Pizzo Gallina	3,061	10,043	378	1,240	46°29′41″N 08°23′31″E	Lepontine Alps	Ticino/Valais	
190	144	Piz Grisch	3,060	10,040	544	1,785	46°31′52″N 09°28′22″E	Oberhalbstein Alps	Graubünden	1861
191	127	Bruschghorn	3,056	10,026	577	1,893	46°37′52″N 09°18′24″E	Lepontine Alps	Graubünden	
192	206	Piz Forun	3,052	10,013	458	1,503	46°39′19″N 09°51′54″E	Albula Alps	Graubünden	1847
193	35	Grand Muveran	3,051	10,010	013	43	46°14′14″N 07°07′34″E	Vaud Alps	Valais/Vaud	
194	124	Piz Minor	3,049	10,003	584	1,916	46°27′04″N 10°01′42″E	Livigno Alps	Graubünden	
195	135	Gross Lohner	3,048	10,000	560	1,840	46°27′43″N 07°36′00″E	Bernese Alps	Bern	1875
196	215	Piz Murtera	3,044	9,987	449	1,473	46°46′31″N 10°02′26″E	Silvretta Alps	Graubünden	
197	353	Gross Wendenstock	3,042	9,980	346	1,135	46°45′42″N 08°22′49″E	Uri Alps	Bern	1873
198	46	Piz Gannaretsch	3,040	9,970	934	3,064	46°36′43″N 08°47′12″E	Lepontine Alps	Graubünden	
199	241	Alperschällihorn	3,039	9,970	425	1,394	46°35′12″N 09°18′23″E	Lepontine Alps	Graubünden	1893
200	80	Piz S-chalembert	3,031	9,944	722	2,369	46°48′03″N 10°24′48″E	Sesvenna Range	Graubünden	
201	77	Piz Por	3,028	9,934	733	2,405	46°30′34″N 09°23′03″E	Oberhalbstein Alps	Graubünden	1894
202	262	Bündner Vorab	3,028	9,934	408	1,339	46°52′26″N 09°09′24″E	Glarus Alps	Glarus/Graubünden	1842
203	90	Piz Corbet	3,025	9,925	672	2,205	46°22′47″N 09°16′49″E	Lepontine Alps	Graubünden	1892
204	421	Wendenhorn	3,023	9,918	311	1,020	46°45′14″N 08°26′37″E	Uri Alps	Bern/Uri	1884
205	417	Piz Blas	3,019	9,905	312	1,024	46°34′38″N 08°43′41″E	Lepontine Alps	Graubünden/Ticino	1871
206	384	Gamspleisspitze	3,015	9,892	328	1,076	46°55′54″N 10°14′31″E	Silvretta Alps	Graubünden	1853
207	240	Älplihorn	3,006	9,862	426	1,398	46°42′39″N 09°49′33″E	Albula Alps	Graubünden	
208	320	Pizzas d'Anarosa / Grauhörner	3,002	9,849	366	1,201	46°35′56″N 09°18′57″E	Lepontine Alps	Graubünden	1894
209	213	Pizzo Centrale	2,999	9,839	451	1,480	46°34′41″N 08°36′54″E	Lepontine Alps	Ticino/Uri	
210	277	Piz Beverin	2,998	9,836	396	1,299	46°39′09″N 09°21′28″E	Lepontine Alps	Graubünden	1707
211	133	Piz de la Lumbreida	2,983	9,787	564	1,850	46°28′52″N 09°13′31″E	Lepontine Alps	Graubünden	
212	13	Aroser Rothorn	2,980	9,780	1,349	4,426	46°44′16″N 09°36′50″E	Plessur Alps	Graubünden	
213	437	La Tsavre	2,978	9,770	305	1,001	45°54′56″N 07°07′46″E	Pennine Alps	Valais	
214	208	Piz Curvér	2,972	9,751	456	1,496	46°36′12″N 09°29′50″E	Oberhalbstein Alps	Graubünden	1843
215	332	Schilthorn	2,970	9,740	358	1,175	46°33′27″N 07°50′05″E	Bernese Alps	Bern	
216	157	Haut de Cry	2,969	9,741	525	1,722	46°14′25″N 07°11′42″E	Vaud Alps	Valais	
217	166	Grieshorn	2,969	9,741	509	1,670	46°27′05″N 08°23′35″E	Lepontine Alps	Ticino	
218	200	Dent de Morcles	2,969	9,741	465	1,526	46°11′57″N 07°04′32″E	Vaud Alps	Valais/Vaud	1787
219	76	Piz Daint	2,968	9,738	734	2,408	46°37′07″N 10°17′27″E	Ortler Alps	Graubünden	
220	58	Schesaplana	2,965	9,728	828	2,717	47°03′13″N 09°42′27″E	Rätikon	Graubünden	610
221	272	Piz Turettas	2,963	9,721	400	1,300	46°35′13″N 10°20′05″E	Ortler Alps	Graubünden	
222	348	Pizzo Lucendro	2,963	9,721	350	1,150	46°32′20″N 08°31′10″E	Lepontine Alps	Ticino/Uri	1871
223	188	Rienzenstock	2,962	9,718	479	1,572	46°40′59″N 08°38′06″E	Glarus Alps	Uri	
224	385	Marchhorn/Pta del Termine	2,962	9,718	327	1,073	46°26′55″N 08°27′45″E	Lepontine Alps	Ticino	
225	158	Piz Lagalb	2,959	9,708	524	1,719	46°25′54″N 10°01′25″E	Livigno Alps	Graubünden	
226	223	Piz Miez	2,956	9,698	445	1,460	46°39′17″N 08°55′00″E	Lepontine Alps	Graubünden	
227	57	Torent / Torrone Alto	2,952	9,685	835	2,740	46°20′37″N 09°04′16″E	Lepontine Alps	Graubünden/Ticino	1882
228	92	Brunnistock	2,952	9,685	661	2,169	46°50′52″N 08°33′00″E	Uri Alps	Uri	
229	182	Crasta Mora	2,952	9,685	486	1,594	46°34′17″N 09°52′05″E	Albula Alps	Graubünden	
230	286	Bättlihorn	2,951	9,682	388	1,273	46°19′57″N 08°05′38″E	Lepontine Alps	Valais	
231	151	Piz Tomül / Wissensteinhorn	2,946	9,665	534	1,752	46°37′24″N 09°13′42″E	Lepontine Alps	Graubünden	1807
232	161	Piz Cavel	2,946	9,665	518	1,699	46°39′21″N 09°01′11″E	Lepontine Alps	Graubünden	
233	129	Einshorn	2,944	9,659	571	1,873	46°30′58″N 09°13′49″E	Lepontine Alps	Graubünden	
234	201	Gross Schinhorn/Punta di Valdeserta	2,939	9,642	465	1,526	46°21′40″N 08°15′39″E	Lepontine Alps	Valais	
235	395	Pizzo del Ramulazz S	2,939	9,642	324	1,063	46°23′48″N 09°05′34″E	Lepontine Alps	Graubünden/Ticino	
236	216	Bärenhorn	2,929	9,610	449	1,473	46°34′32″N 09°13′55″E	Lepontine Alps	Graubünden	
237	317	Rosställispitz	2,929	9,610	368	1,207	46°47′21″N 09°59′37″E	Silvretta Alps	Graubünden	
238	40	Schwarzhorn	2,928	9,606	966	3,169	46°41′10″N 08°04′32″E	Bernese Alps	Bern	
239	154	Badus / Six Madun	2,928	9,606	529	1,736	46°37′21″N 08°39′49″E	Lepontine Alps	Graubünden/Uri	1785
240	134	Eggishorn	2,927	9,603	563	1,847	46°25′53″N 08°05′39″E	Bernese Alps	Valais	
241	340	Mährenhorn	2,923	9,590	355	1,165	46°41′30″N 08°18′39″E	Uri Alps	Bern	
242	406	Dent Favre	2,917	9,570	315	1,033	46°12′37″N 07°06′14″E	Vaud Alps	Valais/Vaud	
243	41	Glärnisch	2,915	9,564	967	3,173	46°59′42″N 08°59′43″E	Schwyz Alps	Glarus	
244	359	Cristallina	2,912	9,554	344	1,129	46°27′53″N 08°32′13″E	Lepontine Alps	Ticino	
245	410	Piz Combul	2,901	9,518	313	1,027	46°13′47″N 10°02′38″E	Bernina Range	Graubünden	
246	221	Grand Chavalard	2,899	9,511	446	1,463	46°10′43″N 07°06′47″E	Vaud Alps	Valais	
247	341	Schwarzhorn / Piz Gren	2,890	9,480	355	1,165	46°40′39″N 09°01′22″E	Lepontine Alps	Graubünden	
248	373	Schildflue	2,887	9,472	333	1,093	46°52′50″N 09°57′23″E	Silvretta Alps	Graubünden	
249	383	Wissigstock	2,887	9,472	329	1,079	46°50′44″N 08°30′24″E	Uri Alps	Obwalden/Uri	
250	300	Guggernüll	2,886	9,469	377	1,237	46°31′26″N 09°16′17″E	Lepontine Alps	Graubünden	
251	171	Piz Fess	2,880	9,450	501	1,644	46°43′39″N 09°17′19″E	Lepontine Alps	Graubünden	1895
252	289	Eisentälispitze	2,875	9,432	386	1,266	46°54′48″N 09°57′45″E	Silvretta Alps	Graubünden	1892
253	294	Nufenenstock	2,866	9,403	381	1,250	46°28′01″N 08°23′18″E	Lepontine Alps	Ticino/Valais	
254	447	Poncione di Braga	2,864	9,396	301	988	46°26′03″N 08°32′34″E	Lepontine Alps	Ticino	
255	212	Wandfluhhorn / Pizzo Biela	2,863	9,393	452	1,483	46°20′41″N 08°27′51″E	Lepontine Alps	Ticino	
256	308	Cima de Barna	2,862	9,390	314	1,030	46°25′14″N 09°15′49″E	Lepontine Alps	Graubünden	
257	321	Gstellihorn	2,855	9,367	366	1,201	46°39′44″N 08°10′29″E	Bernese Alps	Bern	1836
258	411	Piz di Sassiglion	2,855	9,367	313	1,027	46°19′22″N 10°06′45″E	Livigno Alps	Graubünden	
259	207	Pizol	2,844	9,331	457	1,499	46°57′33″N 09°23′12″E	Glarus Alps	St. Gallen	1864
260	174	Weissfluh	2,843	9,327	497	1,631	46°50′06″N 09°47′43″E	Plessur Alps	Graubünden	
261	259	Cima di Gana Bianca	2,842	9,324	410	1,350	46°28′17″N 08°59′32″E	Lepontine Alps	Ticino	
262	115	Madrisahorn	2,826	9,272	600	2,000	46°55′52″N 09°52′20″E	Rätikon	Graubünden	
263	190	Sulzfluh	2,818	9,245	475	1,558	47°00′45″N 09°50′23″E	Rätikon	Graubünden	1782
264	290	Pizzo Castello	2,808	9,213	385	1,263	46°24′56″N 08°33′55″E	Lepontine Alps	Ticino	
265	10	Haldensteiner Calanda	2,805	9,203	460	1,510	46°54′00″N 09°28′03″E	Glarus Alps	Graubünden/StGallen	1559
266	79	Cima de Gagela	2,805	9,203	723	2,372	46°23′03″N 09°10′29″E	Lepontine Alps	Graubünden	
267	185	Corona di Redorta	2,804	9,199	481	1,578	46°22′32″N 08°43′56″E	Lepontine Alps	Ticino	
268	318	Bös Fulen	2,802	9,193	367	1,204	46°58′02″N 08°56′45″E	Schwyz Alps	Glarus/Schwyz	
269	152	Kärpf	2,794	9,167	533	1,749	46°55′00″N 09°05′36″E	Glarus Alps	Glarus	
270	368	Drättehorn	2,794	9,167	340	1,120	46°34′56″N 07°49′26″E	Bernese Alps	Bern	
271	195	Pizzo Quadro	2,793	9,163	470	1,540	46°17′55″N 08°25′05″E	Lepontine Alps	Ticino	
272	229	Pizzo Marumo	2,790	9,150	435	1,427	46°35′54″N 08°57′34″E	Lepontine Alps	Ticino	
273	396	Le Luisin	2,786	9,140	324	1,063	46°07′15″N 06°58′12″E	Chablais Alps	Valais	
274	356	Tiejer Flue	2,781	9,124	345	1,132	46°46′51″N 09°44′04″E	Plessur Alps	Graubünden	
275	138	Pizzo del Sole	2,773	9,098	555	1,821	46°31′30″N 08°46′04″E	Lepontine Alps	Ticino	
276	381	Il Madone (Note: High point between Il Madone and Campanile)	2,768	9,081	330	1,080	46°29′31″N 08°34′01″E	Lepontine Alps	Ticino	
277	86	Schächentaler Windgällen	2,764	9,068	691	2,267	46°53′17″N 08°47′30″E	Schwyz Alps	Uri	
278	360	Schwarzberg / Piz Nair	2,764	9,068	343	1,125	46°36′34″N 08°40′40″E	Lepontine Alps	Graubünden/Uri	
279	60	Albristhorn	2,763	9,065	823	2,700	46°29′53″N 07°29′16″E	Bernese Alps	Bern	
280	243	Pizzo Massari	2,760	9,060	424	1,391	46°28′33″N 08°41′00″E	Lepontine Alps	Ticino	
281	326	Dent de Barme	2,759	9,052	364	1,194	46°07′55″N 06°50′31″E	Chablais Alps	Valais	
282	366	Reeti / Rötihorn	2,757	9,045	341	1,119	46°39′54″N 08°00′42″E	Bernese Alps	Bern	
283	375	Ärmighorn	2,742	8,996	332	1,089	46°32′30″N 07°42′49″E	Bernese Alps	Bern	
284	103	Madom Gröss	2,741	8,993	630	2,070	46°22′00″N 08°49′52″E	Lepontine Alps	Ticino	
285	304	Schenadüi	2,738	8,983	375	1,230	46°33′09″N 08°44′55″E	Lepontine Alps	Ticino	
286	397	Spitzhorli	2,737	8,980	320	1,050	46°15′52″N 07°58′50″E	Pennine Alps	Valais	
287	139	Monte Zucchero	2,735	8,973	554	1,818	46°21′15″N 08°42′51″E	Lepontine Alps	Ticino	
288	330	Pizzo di Claro	2,727	8,947	361	1,184	46°17′45″N 09°03′20″E	Lepontine Alps	Graubünden/Ticino	
289	146	Ortstock	2,716	8,911	538	1,765	46°55′31″N 08°56′53″E	Schwyz Alps	Glarus/Schwyz	
290	371	Pizzo Straciugo	2,713	8,901	335	1,099	46°07′56″N 08°07′15″E	Pennine Alps	Valais	
291	279	Mont Gond	2,710	8,890	395	1,296	46°17′08″N 07°15′49″E	Vaud Alps	Valais	
292	310	Gsür	2,708	8,885	372	1,220	46°30′39″N 07°31′11″E	Bernese Alps	Bern	
293	175	Rotsandnollen	2,700	8,900	493	1,617	46°48′02″N 08°20′38″E	Uri Alps	Nidwalden/Obwalden	
294	233	Piz de Groven	2,694	8,839	433	1,421	46°19′06″N 09°09′33″E	Lepontine Alps	Graubünden	
295	155	Piz Pian Grand	2,689	8,822	528	1,732	46°25′03″N 09°09′20″E	Lepontine Alps	Graubünden	
296	349	Cima del Serraglio	2,685	8,809	350	1,150	46°35′34″N 10°14′32″E	Ortler Alps	Graubünden	
297	217	Piz della Forcola	2,675	8,776	449	1,473	46°18′59″N 09°17′36″E	Lepontine Alps	Graubünden	
298	426	Piz Toissa	2,657	8,717	310	1,020	46°37′07″N 09°31′30″E	Oberhalbstein Alps	Graubünden	
299	306	Männliflue	2,652	8,701	374	1,227	46°33′05″N 07°32′47″E	Bernese Alps	Bern	
300	345	Munt Buffalora	2,630	8,630	351	1,152	46°37′37″N 10°15′00″E	Ortler Alps	Graubünden	
301	346	Piz Cavradi	2,614	8,576	351	1,152	46°37′57″N 08°41′44″E	Lepontine Alps	Graubünden	
302	336	Pizzo dell'Alpe Gelato	2,613	8,573	357	1,171	46°14′59″N 08°26′39″E	Lepontine Alps	Ticino	
303	428	Cima Bianca	2,612	8,570	309	1,014	46°23′16″N 08°48′45″E	Lepontine Alps	Ticino	
304	287	Foostock / Ruchen	2,611	8,566	388	1,273	46°57′24″N 09°14′41″E	Glarus Alps	Glarus/St. Gallen	
305	344	Vorder Grauspitz	2,599	8,527	353	1,158	47°03′10″N 09°34′52″E	Rätikon	Graubünden	
306	25	Le Catogne	2,598	8,524	1,100	3,600	46°03′15″N 07°06′39″E	Mont Blanc massif	Valais	
307	173	Pizzo Paglia	2,593	8,507	498	1,634	46°13′54″N 09°13′09″E	Lepontine Alps	Graubünden	
308	33	Stätzerhorn	2,575	8,448	1,028	3,373	46°45′21″N 09°30′44″E	Plessur Alps	Graubünden	
309	308	Pfannenstock	2,573	8,442	373	1,224	46°57′42″N 08°54′41″E	Schwyz Alps	Schwyz	
310	412	Kirchlispitzen	2,552	8,373	313	1,027	47°02′20″N 09°46′10″E	Rätikon	Graubünden	1891
311	36	Le Tarent	2,548	8,360	1,002	3,287	46°22′56″N 07°08′51″E	Vaud Alps	Vaud	
312	130	Rosso di Ribia	2,547	8,356	569	1,867	46°15′40″N 08°31′47″E	Lepontine Alps	Ticino	
313	137	Giferspitz	2,542	8,340	556	1,824	46°27′04″N 07°21′12″E	Bernese Alps	Bern	
314	140	Glogghüs	2,534	8,314	554	1,818	46°45′38″N 08°15′45″E	Uri Alps	Bern/Obwalden	
315	248	Hochwang	2,534	8,314	417	1,368	46°52′27″N 09°37′59″E	Plessur Alps	Graubünden	
316	337	Magerrain	2,524	8,281	357	1,171	47°01′59″N 09°13′12″E	Glarus Alps	Glarus/St. Gallen	
317	205	Tschuggen	2,521	8,271	460	1,510	46°36′01″N 07°56′59″E	Bernese Alps	Bern	
318	160	Dreispitz	2,520	8,270	523	1,716	46°35′34″N 07°45′35″E	Bernese Alps	Bern	
319	413	Cima di Bri	2,520	8,270	313	1,027	46°18′19″N 08°53′03″E	Lepontine Alps	Ticino	
320	196	Chaiserstock	2,515	8,251	470	1,540	46°55′42″N 08°43′43″E	Schwyz Alps	Schwyz/Uri	
321	4	Säntis	2,502	8,209	2,015	6,611	47°14′58″N 09°20′36″E	Appenzell Alps	Appenzell A./Appenzell I./St. Gallen	1680
322	422	Fulen	2,491	8,173	311	1,020	46°55′07″N 08°42′53″E	Schwyz Alps	Schwyz/Uri	
323	209	Cima di Pinadee	2,486	8,156	455	1,493	46°30′48″N 08°58′37″E	Lepontine Alps	Ticino	
324	210	Spillgerte	2,476	8,123	453	1,486	46°32′12″N 07°26′48″E	Bernese Alps	Bern	
325	450	Pierre Avoi	2,473	8,114	300	980	46°07′05″N 07°12′01″E	Pennine Alps	Valais	
326	128	Gummfluh	2,458	8,064	574	1,883	46°26′26″N 07°11′42″E	Bernese Alps	Bern/Vaud	
327	313	Hohniesen	2,454	8,051	371	1,217	46°34′38″N 07°35′00″E	Bernese Alps	Bern	
328	114	Mürtschenstock	2,441	8,009	601	1,972	47°04′10″N 09°08′41″E	Glarus Alps	Glarus	
329	244	Gufelstock	2,436	7,992	423	1,388	47°01′30″N 09°08′48″E	Glarus Alps	Glarus	
330	414	Altmann	2,435	7,989	313	1,027	47°14′22″N 09°22′18″E	Appenzell Alps	Appenzell I./St. Gallen	
331	132	Seehorn	2,434	7,986	567	1,860	46°10′57″N 08°06′56″E	Pennine Alps	Valais	
332	27	Cornettes de Bise	2,432	7,979	063	207	46°19′57″N 06°47′04″E	Chablais Alps	Valais	
333	280	L'Argentine (Haute Pointe)	2,422	7,946	393	1,289	46°16′24″N 07°07′51″E	Vaud Alps	Vaud	
334	451	Pizzo Erra	2,416	7,927	300	980	46°26′28″N 08°53′27″E	Lepontine Alps	Ticino	
335	181	Hoh Brisen	2,413	7,917	489	1,604	46°53′51″N 08°27′57″E	Uri Alps	Nidwalden/Uri	
336	23	Vanil Noir	2,389	7,838	1,110	3,640	46°31′43″N 07°08′54″E	Bernese Alps	Fribourg/Vaud	
337	12	Gamsberg	2,385	7,825	1,358	4,455	47°08′07″N 09°22′28″E	Appenzell Alps	St. Gallen	
338	249	Vilan	2,376	7,795	416	1,365	47°00′46″N 09°36′11″E	Rätikon	Graubünden	
339	376	Pizzo di Campel	2,376	7,795	332	1,089	46°19′55″N 09°15′42″E	Lepontine Alps	Graubünden	
340	263	Niesen	2,362	7,749	407	1,335	46°38′46″N 07°39′09″E	Bernese Alps	Bern	
341	315	Wistätthorn	2,362	7,749	370	1,210	46°27′15″N 07°23′11″E	Bernese Alps	Bern	
342	390	Poncione Piancascia	2,360	7,740	325	1,066	46°17′57″N 08°43′58″E	Lepontine Alps	Ticino	
343	14	Brienzer Rothorn	2,350	7,710	342	1,122	46°47′13″N 08°02′49″E	Emmental Alps	Bern/Lucerne/Obwalden	
344	202	Wittenberghorn	2,350	7,710	465	1,526	46°24′58″N 07°12′36″E	Bernese Alps	Bern/Vaud	
345	391	Wasserbergfirst	2,341	7,680	325	1,066	46°56′22″N 08°47′21″E	Schwyz Alps	Schwyz	
346	49	Tour d'Aï	2,331	7,648	886	2,907	46°22′20″N 07°00′02″E	Vaud Alps	Vaud	
347	361	Marmontana	2,316	7,598	343	1,125	46°10′19″N 09°10′13″E	Lugano Prealps	Graubünden	
348	197	Hinterrugg	2,306	7,566	470	1,540	47°09′13″N 09°18′17″E	Appenzell Alps	St. Gallen	
349	74	Mutteristock (Redertenstock)	2,295	7,530	745	2,444	47°02′54″N 08°56′35″E	Schwyz Alps	Glarus/Schwyz	
350	203	Rautispitz	2,283	7,490	465	1,526	47°04′16″N 09°00′42″E	Schwyz Alps	Glarus	
351	81	Druesberg	2,282	7,487	722	2,369	46°00′15″N 08°50′00″E	Schwyz Alps	Schwyz	
352	392	Brisi	2,279	7,477	325	1,066	47°09′12″N 09°16′36″E	Appenzell Alps	St. Gallen	
353	55	Dent de Savigny	2,252	7,388	848	2,782	46°32′59″N 07°13′36″E	Bernese Alps	Fribourg/Vaud	
354	316	Morgenberghorn	2,249	7,379	370	1,210	46°37′20″N 07°47′37″E	Bernese Alps	Bern	
355	75	Schafberg	2,239	7,346	735	2,411	46°38′13″N 07°19′01″E	Bernese Alps	Bern/Fribourg	
356	159	Sosto	2,221	7,287	524	1,719	46°32′54″N 08°57′07″E	Lepontine Alps	Ticino	
357	323	Les Jumelles	2,215	7,267	365	1,198	46°21′08″N 06°48′49″E	Chablais Alps	Valais	
358	99	Hohgant	2,197	7,208	638	2,093	46°47′17″N 07°54′07″E	Emmental Alps	Bern	
359	120	Chrüz	2,196	7,205	589	1,932	46°57′18″N 09°46′30″E	Rätikon	Graubünden	
360	273	Stockhorn	2,190	7,190	399	1,309	46°41′38″N 07°32′15″E	Bernese Alps	Bern	
361	156	Gros Van	2,189	7,182	528	1,732	46°23′47″N 07°04′09″E	Vaud Alps	Vaud	
362	19	Gridone/Monte Limidario	2,188	7,178	1,218	3,996	46°07′24″N 08°38′53″E	Lepontine Alps	Ticino	
363	291	Ochsen	2,188	7,178	384	1,260	46°41′56″N 07°25′07″E	Bernese Alps	Bern	
364	239	Hochmatt	2,152	7,060	428	1,404	46°34′33″N 07°13′12″E	Bernese Alps	Fribourg	
365	122	Pilatus (Tomlishorn)	2,128	6,982	585	1,919	46°58′26″N 08°14′28″E	Emmental Alps	Nidwalden/Obwalden	
366	301	Le Chamossaire	2,112	6,929	377	1,237	46°19′36″N 07°03′41″E	Vaud Alps	Vaud	
367	327	Schluchberg	2,106	6,909	364	1,194	46°52′00″N 08°20′02″E	Uri Alps	Nidwalden/Obwalden	
368	147	Schopfenspitz/Gros Brun	2,104	6,903	537	1,762	46°37′21″N 07°15′02″E	Bernese Alps	Fribourg	
369	68	Schrattenfluh (Hengst)	2,092	6,864	776	2,546	46°50′04″N 07°57′28″E	Emmental Alps	Lucerne	
370	136	Mont de l'Arpille	2,085	6,841	557	1,827	46°04′38″N 07°00′24″E	Mont Blanc massif	Valais	
371	314	Rinderberg	2,079	6,821	371	1,217	46°30′19″N 07°21′25″E	Bernese Alps	Bern	
372	362	Turnen	2,079	6,821	343	1,125	46°37′40″N 07°29′33″E	Bernese Alps	Bern	
373	167	Burgfeldstand	2,063	6,768	508	1,667	46°43′20″N 07°47′41″E	Emmental Alps	Bern	
374	311	Sigriswiler Rothorn	2,051	6,729	372	1,220	46°43′50″N 07°46′14″E	Emmental Alps	Bern	
375	252	Hundsrügg	2,047	6,716	414	1,358	46°33′24″N 07°18′19″E	Bernese Alps	Bern	
376	295	Güpfi	2,043	6,703	381	1,250	46°47′46″N 08°11′43″E	Uri Alps	Obwalden	
377	118	Rochers de Naye	2,042	6,699	590	1,940	46°25′55″N 06°58′34″E	Vaud Alps	Vaud	
378	342	Pointe de Bellevue	2,042	6,699	355	1,165	46°15′27″N 06°53′15″E	Chablais Alps	Valais	
379	186	Fürstein	2,040	6,690	481	1,578	46°53′44″N 08°04′11″E	Emmental Alps	Lucerne/Obwalden	
380	268	Pointe d'Aveneyre	2,026	6,647	405	1,329	46°25′02″N 07°00′17″E	Vaud Alps	Vaud	
381	170	Dent de Lys	2,014	6,608	505	1,657	46°30′28″N 07°00′11″E	Vaud Alps	Fribourg	
382	269	Bäderhorn	2,009	6,591	404	1,325	46°36′48″N 07°19′39″E	Bernese Alps	Bern	
383	382	Pizzo Ruscada	2,004	6,575	330	1,080	46°10′39″N 08°35′34″E	Lepontine Alps	Ticino	
384	164	Moléson	2,002	6,568	512	1,680	46°32′56″N 07°01′02″E	Vaud Alps	Fribourg	
385	126	Dent de Corjon	1,967	6,453	579	1,900	46°27′00″N 07°02′09″E	Vaud Alps	Vaud	
386	11	Monte Tamaro	1,961	6,434	1,408	4,619	46°06′14″N 08°51′58″E	Lugano Prealps	Ticino	
387	150	Speer	1,951	6,401	535	1,755	47°11′08″N 09°07′22″E	Appenzell Alps	St. Gallen	
388	443	Furgglenfirst	1,951	6,401	302	991	47°15′24″N 09°26′25″E	Appenzell Alps	Appenzell I./St. Gallen	
389	324	Hagleren	1,949	6,394	365	1,198	46°37′21″N 07°15′02″E	Emmental Alps	Lucerne/Obwalden	
390	333	Mattstock	1,936	6,352	358	1,175	47°10′11″N 09°08′09″E	Appenzell Alps	St. Gallen	
391	219	Chlingenstock	1,935	6,348	448	1,470	46°57′26″N 08°40′29″E	Schwyz Alps	Schwyz	
392	286	Niderbauen-Chulm	1,923	6,309	327	1,073	46°56′51″N 08°33′24″E	Uri Alps	Nidwalden/Uri	
393	172	Stanserhorn	1,898	6,227	500	1,600	46°55′47″N 08°20′25″E	Uri Alps	Nidwalden	
394	176	Grosser Mythen	1,898	6,227	493	1,617	47°01′47″N 08°41′20″E	Schwyz Alps	Schwyz	
395	204	Chöpfenberg	1,896	6,220	465	1,526	47°07′07″N 08°58′07″E	Schwyz Alps	Glarus/Schwyz	
396	354	Schimbrig	1,815	5,955	346	1,135	46°56′23″N 08°06′50″E	Emmental Alps	Lucerne	
397	309	Kleiner Mythen	1,811	5,942	373	1,224	47°02′27″N 08°41′03″E	Schwyz Alps	Schwyz	
398	438	Cima di Fojorina	1,810	5,940	305	1,001	46°03′46″N 09°04′22″E	Lugano Prealps	Ticino	
399	17	Rigi (Kulm)	1,797	5,896	1,288	4,226	47°03′24″N 08°29′08″E	Schwyz Alps	Schwyz	
400	444	Stockberg	1,782	5,846	302	991	47°13′44″N 09°14′34″E	Appenzell Alps	St. Gallen	
401	187	Beichle	1,770	5,810	480	1,570	46°53′51″N 07°58′23″E	Emmental Alps	Lucerne	
402	369	Monte Gambarogno	1,734	5,689	339	1,112	46°06′44″N 08°49′49″E	Lugano Prealps	Ticino	
403	432	La Berra	1,719	5,640	308	1,010	46°40′34″N 07°11′03″E	Bernese Alps	Fribourg	
404	16	Monte Generoso	1,701	5,581	321	1,053	45°55′53″N 09°01′12″E	Lugano Prealps	Ticino	
405	168	Rigi Hochflue	1,699	5,574	509	1,670	47°00′36″N 08°33′36″E	Schwyz Alps	Schwyz	
406	287	Gross Aubrig	1,695	5,561	327	1,073	47°06′41″N 08°52′57″E	Schwyz Alps	Schwyz	
407	214	Mont Tendre	1,679	5,509	451	1,480	46°35′41″N 06°18′36″E	Jura Mountains	Vaud	
408	343	La Dôle	1,677	5,502	355	1,165	46°25′30″N 06°05′58″E	Jura Mountains	Vaud	
409	347	Kronberg	1,663	5,456	351	1,152	47°17′29″N 09°19′46″E	Appenzell Alps	Appenzell I.	
410	91	Chasseral	1,607	5,272	667	2,188	47°09′59″N 07°03′34″E	Jura Mountains	Bern	
411	119	Chasseron	1,607	5,272	590	1,940	46°51′06″N 06°32′19″E	Jura Mountains	Vaud	
412	230	Le Suchet	1,588	5,210	435	1,427	46°46′21″N 06°27′58″E	Jura Mountains	Vaud	
413	66	Rossberg (Wildspitz)	1,580	5,180	780	2,560	47°05′03″N 08°34′40″E	Schwyz Alps	Schwyz/Zug	
414	418	Farneren	1,572	5,157	312	1,024	46°56′03″N 08°02′29″E	Emmental Alps	Lucerne	
415	183	Monte Salmone	1,560	5,120	484	1,588	46°12′34″N 08°42′26″E	Lepontine Alps	Ticino	
416	419	Honegg	1,546	5,072	312	1,024	46°48′13″N 07°48′14″E	Emmental Alps	Bern	
417	364	Monte Boglia	1,516	4,974	342	1,122	46°01′47″N 09°00′27″E	Lugano Prealps	Ticino	
418	370	Dent de Vaulion	1,483	4,865	339	1,112	46°41′05″N 06°21′00″E	Jura Mountains	Vaud	
419	108	Hasenmatt	1,445	4,741	618	2,028	47°14′31″N 07°27′02″E	Jura Mountains	Solothurn	
420	401	Mont Racine	1,439	4,721	319	1,047	47°01′19″N 06°48′58″E	Jura Mountains	Neuchâtel	
421	226	Wachthubel	1,415	4,642	443	1,453	46°50′50″N 07°52′12″E	Emmental Alps	Bern/Lucerne	
422	142	Napf	1,408	4,619	552	1,811	47°00′15″N 07°56′24″E	Emmental Alps	Bern/Lucerne	
423	398	Schwändiblueme	1,396	4,580	320	1,050	46°44′49″N 07°42′40″E	Emmental Alps	Bern	
424	281	Moron	1,337	4,386	393	1,289	47°15′45″N 07°15′49″E	Jura Mountains	Bern	
425	145	Tweralpspitz	1,332	4,370	542	1,778	47°17′27″N 09°01′34″E	Appenzell Alps	St. Gallen	
426	423	Höchhand	1,314	4,311	311	1,020	47°17′52″N 08°58′41″E	Appenzell Alps	St. Gallen	
427	266	Hundwiler Höhi	1,306	4,285	406	1,332	47°20′27″N 09°20′00″E	Appenzell Alps	Appenzell A./Appenzell I.	
428	153	Mont Raimeux	1,302	4,272	533	1,749	47°18′30″N 07°25′45″E	Jura Mountains	Bern/Jura	
429	319	Gäbris	1,251	4,104	367	1,204	47°22′54″N 09°28′04″E	Appenzell Alps	Appenzell A.	
430	420	Morgartenberg	1,244	4,081	312	1,024	47°05′59″N 08°39′19″E	Schwyz Alps	Schwyz	
431	224	Walenmattweid	1,240	4,070	445	1,460	47°17′03″N 07°29′07″E	Jura Mountains	Bern/Solothurn	
432	448	Vogelberg (Passwang)	1,204	3,950	301	988	47°22′06″N 07°40′56″E	Jura Mountains	Solothurn	
433	307	Le Gibloux	1,204	3,950	374	1,227	46°41′03″N 07°02′26″E	Bernese Alps	Fribourg	
434	427	Wilkethöchi	1,172	3,845	310	1,020	47°20′18″N 09°10′30″E	Appenzell Alps	St. Gallen	
435	247	Fläscherberg (Regitzer Spitz)	1,135	3,724	422	1,385	47°02′15″N 09°30′23″E	Rätikon	Graubünden	
436	88	Bürgenstock	1,128	3,701	683	2,241	47°00′01″N 08°23′55″E	Uri Alps	Lucerne/Nidwalden	
437	282	Ruchen	1,123	3,684	392	1,286	47°21′44″N 07°48′23″E	Jura Mountains	Basel-Landschaft/Solothurn	
438	256	Blasenflue	1,118	3,668	413	1,355	46°55′56″N 07°41′45″E	Emmental Alps	Bern	
439	334	Bachtel	1,115	3,658	358	1,175	47°17′41″N 08°53′11″E	Appenzell Alps	Zurich	
440	70	Monte San Giorgio	1,097	3,599	758	2,487	45°54′49″N 08°56′59″E	Lugano Prealps	Ticino	
441	388	Mont Pèlerin	1,080	3,540	327	1,073	46°29′49″N 06°49′09″E	Vaud Alps	Vaud	
442	357	Poncione d'Arzo	1,015	3,330	345	1,132	45°53′32″N 08°55′27″E	Lugano Prealps	Ticino	
443	424	Wisenberg	1,002	3,287	311	1,020	47°24′09″N 07°52′54″E	Jura Mountains	Basel-Landschaft	
444	399	Bantiger	947	3,107	320	1,050	46°58′41″N 07°31′39″E	Emmental Alps	Bern	
445	305	Bürglen (Albis)	915	3,002	375	1,230	47°15′28″N 08°32′14″E	Albis	Zurich	
446	112	Monte San Salvatore	912	2,992	602	1,975	45°58′37″N 08°56′50″E	Lugano Prealps	Ticino	
447	335	Lindenberg	878	2,881	358	1,175	47°15′13″N 08°17′35″E	Lindenberg	Lucerne	
448	377	Stierenberg	872	2,861	332	1,089	47°14′18″N 08°09′32″E	Stierenberg	Aargau	
449	242	Lägern	866	2,841	425	1,394	47°28′54″N 08°23′41″E	Jura Mountains	Zurich	
450	374	Pfannenstiel	853	2,799	333	1,093	47°17′30″N 08°40′17″E	Pfannenstiel	Zurich	
451	296	Rooterberg	840	2,760	380	1,250	47°05′53″N 08°23′38″E	Rooterberg	Lucerne	

== See also ==
- Swiss Alps#Toponymy - for a list of common names used for mountains
- List of mountain passes in Switzerland
- List of glaciers in Switzerland
- List of mountain lakes of Switzerland

== Bibliography ==
- Jonathan de Ferranti & Eberhard Jurgalski's map-checked ALPS TO R589m and rough, computer-generated EUROPE TO R150m lists
- Christian Thöni's list of 8875 summits in Switzerland
