= Fex =

Fex or FEX may refer to:

== Science and technology ==
- Fabric extenders, in Cisco Nexus switches
- Fexofenadine, an antihistamine pharmaceutical drug
- FEX-Emu, an emulator for running x86 applications on ARM64 Linux

== Other uses ==
- Fex (band), German new wave and post-punk band
- Flughafen-Express (FEX), Berlin's airport express train
- Foreign extemporaneous speaking, a speech delivery style
- Val Fex, a valley in Switzerland
