= Poncione d'Alnasca =

Mountain in Switzerland

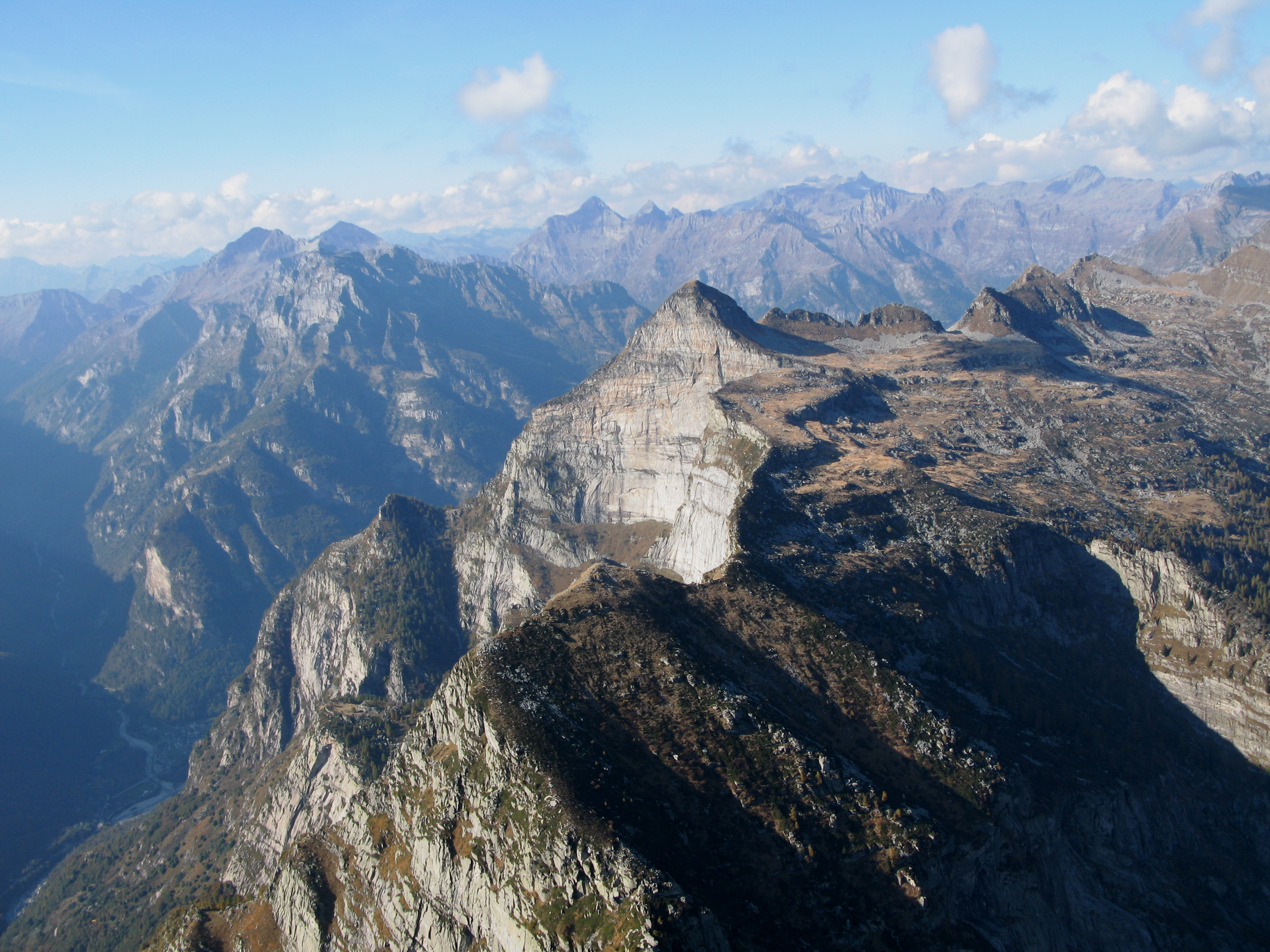
- Aerial view

Highest point
- Elevation: 2,301 m (7,549 ft)
- Prominence: 166 m (545 ft)
- Parent peak: Cima di Gagnone
- Coordinates: 46°17′32″N 8°49′25″E

Geography
- Location within Switzerland
- Location: Ticino, Switzerland
- Parent range: Lepontine Alps

The Poncione d'Alnasca is a mountain of the Lepontine Alps, located east of Brione in the canton of Ticino. It is located on the range south of the Cima di Gagnone.

The south side consists of a pyramid-shaped and almost vertical rock face.
