= Bürglen =

Bürglen can refer to several places in Switzerland:

- Bürglen, Obwalden, a settlement in the municipality of Lungern in the canton of Obwalden
- Bürglen, Thurgau
- Bürglen, Uri, at the entrance of Schächental, start of the Klausen pass road
- Bürglen (Albis), a mountain in the canton of Zurich
