= Il Chapütschin =

Mountain in Switzerland

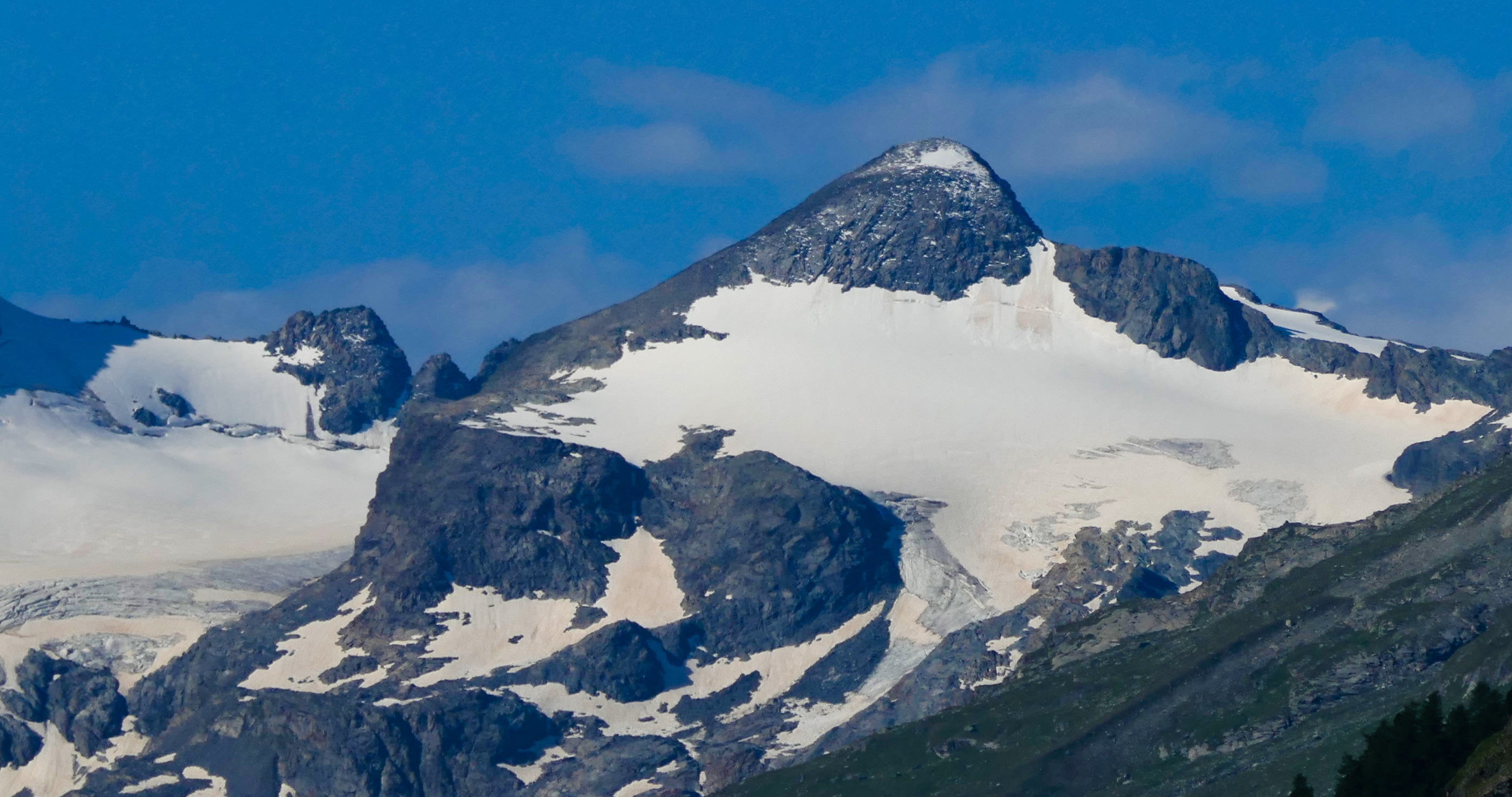

Highest point
- Elevation: 3,386 m (11,109 ft)
- Prominence: 165 m (541 ft)
- Parent peak: Piz Bernina
- Coordinates: 46°22′29.1″N 9°49′8.9″E

Geography
- Location within Switzerland
- Location: Graubünden, Switzerland
- Parent range: Bernina Range

Il Chapütschin is a mountain in the Bernina Range of the Alps, located between the Val Fex and the Val Roseg in the canton of Graubünden. On its eastern side, it overlooks the Roseg Glacier.
