= Cima di Gagnone =

Mountain in Switzerland

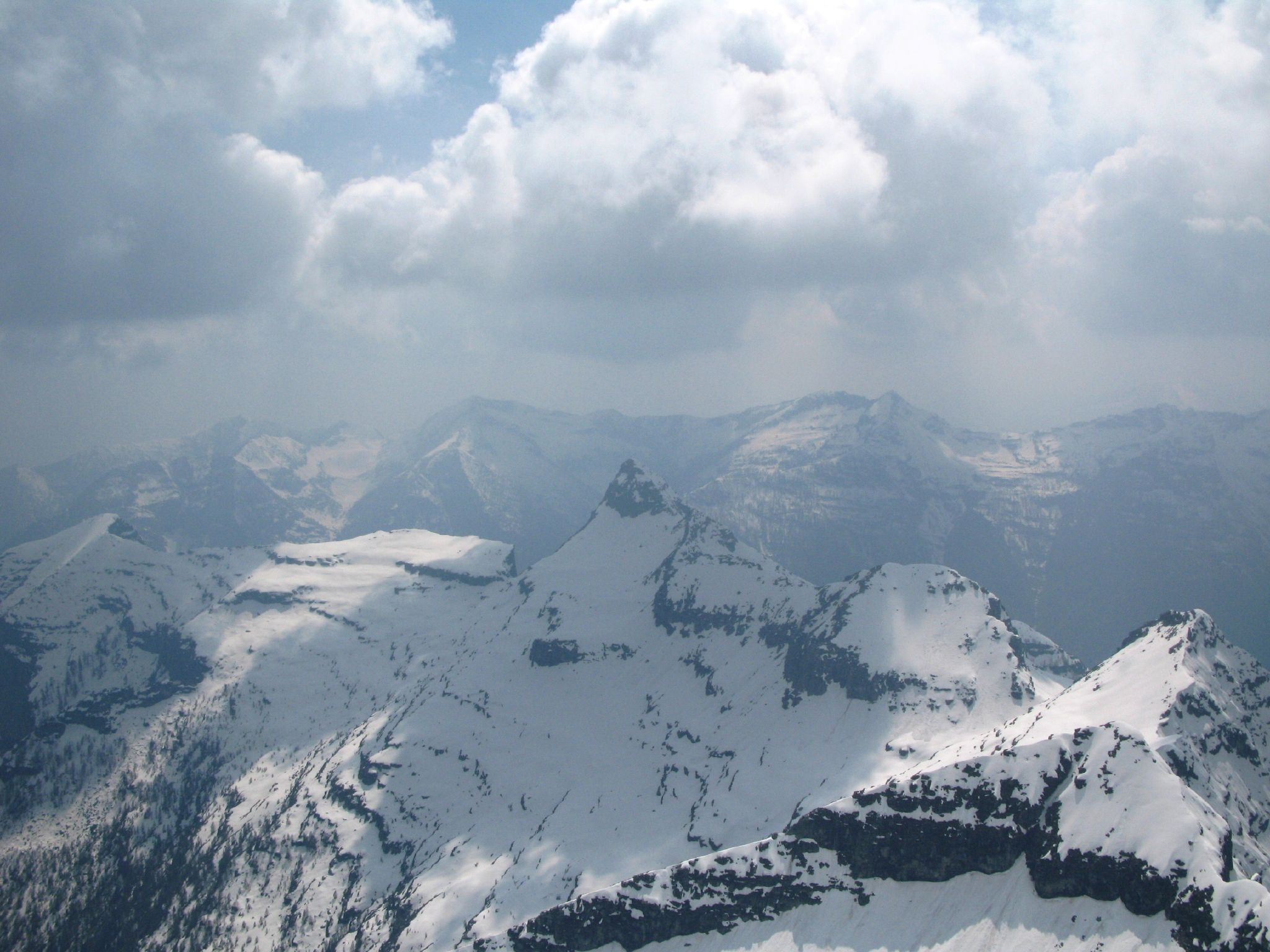
- Cima di Gagnone (central peak)

Highest point
- Elevation: 2,518 m (8,261 ft)
- Prominence: 223 m (732 ft)
- Parent peak: Cima di Bri
- Coordinates: 46°19′36.3″N 8°50′49.2″E

Geography
- Location within Switzerland
- Location: Ticino, Switzerland
- Parent range: Lepontine Alps

Cima di Gagnone is a medium sized mountain in the Lepontine Alps it is located in the Swiss canton of Ticino. It is located between the valleys of Verzasca and Leventina, south of Passo di Gagnone.
