= Vogelberg (Passwang) =

Mountain in Switzerland

- Passwang
- Location within Switzerland

Highest point
- Elevation: 1,204 m (3,950 ft)
- Prominence: 301 m (988 ft)
- Parent peak: Walenmattweid
- Coordinates: 47°22′06″N 7°40′56″E

Geography
- Location: Solothurn, Switzerland
- Parent range: Jura Mountains

Climbing
- Easiest route: Trail

The Vogelberg (also known as Passwang; 1,204.1 m) is a mountain of the Jura, located north of Mümliswil in the Swiss canton of Solothurn. It lies east of the Passwang Pass. The border with the canton of Basel-Landschaft runs north of the mountain. The Vogelberg is the easternmost summit above 1,200 metres in the Jura Mountains.
