= Cima di Broglio =

Mountain in Switzerland

- Location within Switzerland

Highest point
- Elevation: 2,385 m (7,825 ft)
- Prominence: 243 m (797 ft)
- Parent peak: Finsteraarhorn
- Coordinates: 46°19′49.5″N 8°41′1.1″E

Geography
- Location: Ticino, Switzerland
- Parent range: Lepontine Alps

The Cima di Broglio is a mountain of the Swiss Lepontine Alps, located east of Cevio in the canton of Ticino. It lies south of Monte Zucchero, on the range between the Valle Maggia and the Valle Verzasca.
