= Poncione Piancascia =

Mountain in Switzerland

- Location within Switzerland

Highest point
- Elevation: 2,360 m (7,740 ft)
- Prominence: 325 m (1,066 ft)
- Coordinates: 46°17′56.7″N 8°43′58″E

Geography
- Location: Ticino, Switzerland
- Parent range: Lepontine Alps

The Poncione Piancascia is a mountain of the Swiss Lepontine Alps, overlooking Brione in the canton of Ticino. It lies between the Valle Maggia and the Valle Verzasca. The Poncione di Piancascia has an elevation of 2,360 metres and is the highest summit on the range south of Pizzo delle Pecore.
