= Schlossberg (Uri) =

Mountain in Switzerland

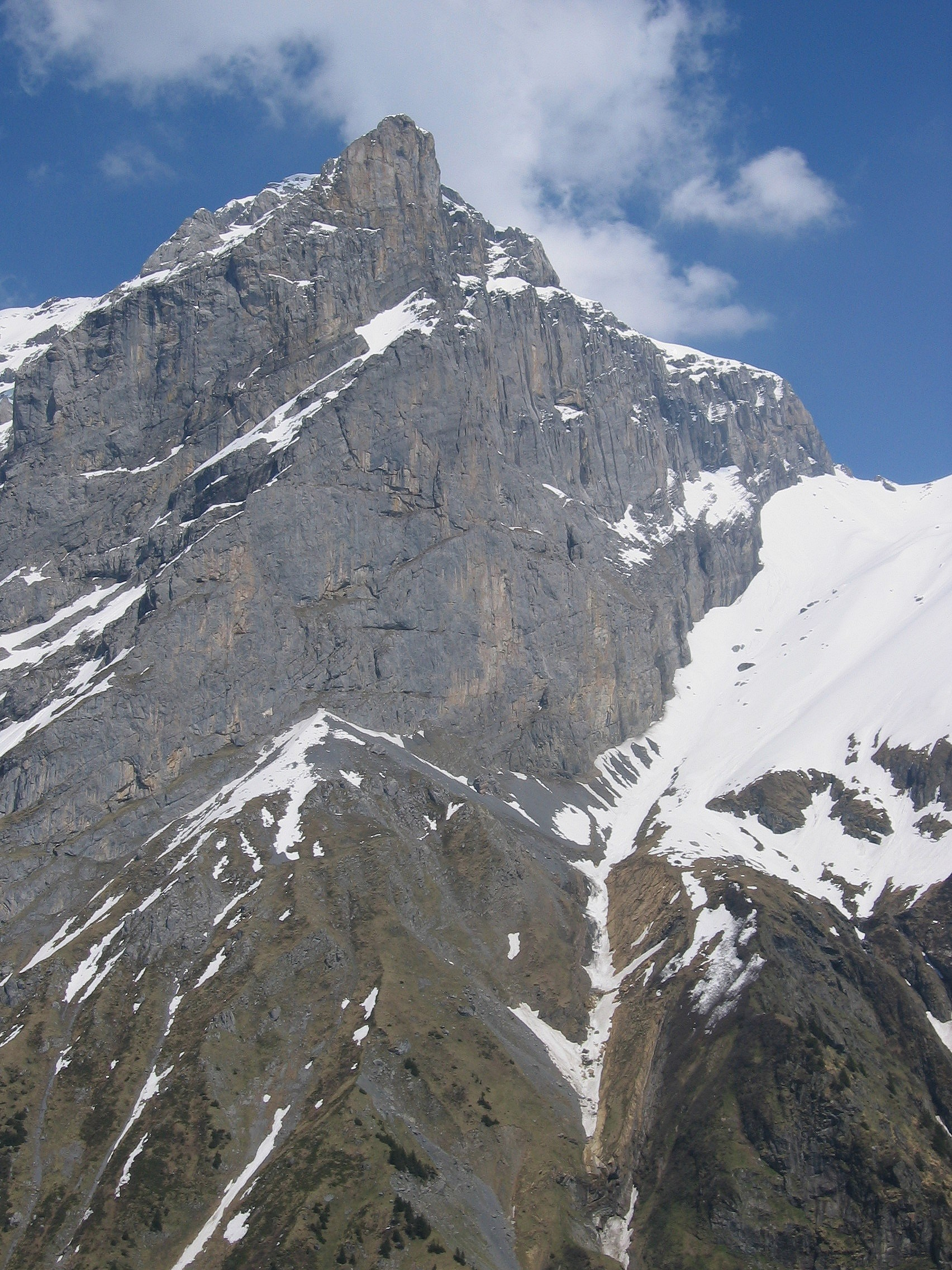

Highest point
- Elevation: 3,133 m (10,279 ft)
- Prominence: 506 m (1,660 ft)
- Parent peak: Gross Spannort
- Listing: Alpine mountains above 3000 m
- Coordinates: 46°48′10″N 8°31′38″E

Geography
- Location within Switzerland
- Location: Uri, Switzerland
- Parent range: Urner Alps

The Schlossberg is a mountain of the Urner Alps, located between Engelberg and Erstfeld in Central Switzerland. It lies north of the Gross Spannort in the canton of Uri.

The Schlossberg is composed of several summit of which the higher (named Hinter Schloss) has an elevation of 3,133 metres.
