= Pizzo delle Pecore =

Mountain of the Swiss Lepontine Alps

- Location within Switzerland

Highest point
- Elevation: 2,381 m (7,812 ft)
- Prominence: 66 m (217 ft)
- Parent peak: Cima di Broglio
- Coordinates: 46°19′29.6″N 8°40′53.5″E

Geography
- Location: Ticino, Switzerland
- Parent range: Lepontine Alps

Pizzo delle Pecore (2,381 m) is a mountain of the Swiss Lepontine Alps, located east of Cevio in the canton of Ticino. It lies just south of the slightly higher Cima di Broglio, on the range between the Valle Maggia and the Valle Verzasca.
