= Chli Spannort =

Mountain in Switzerland

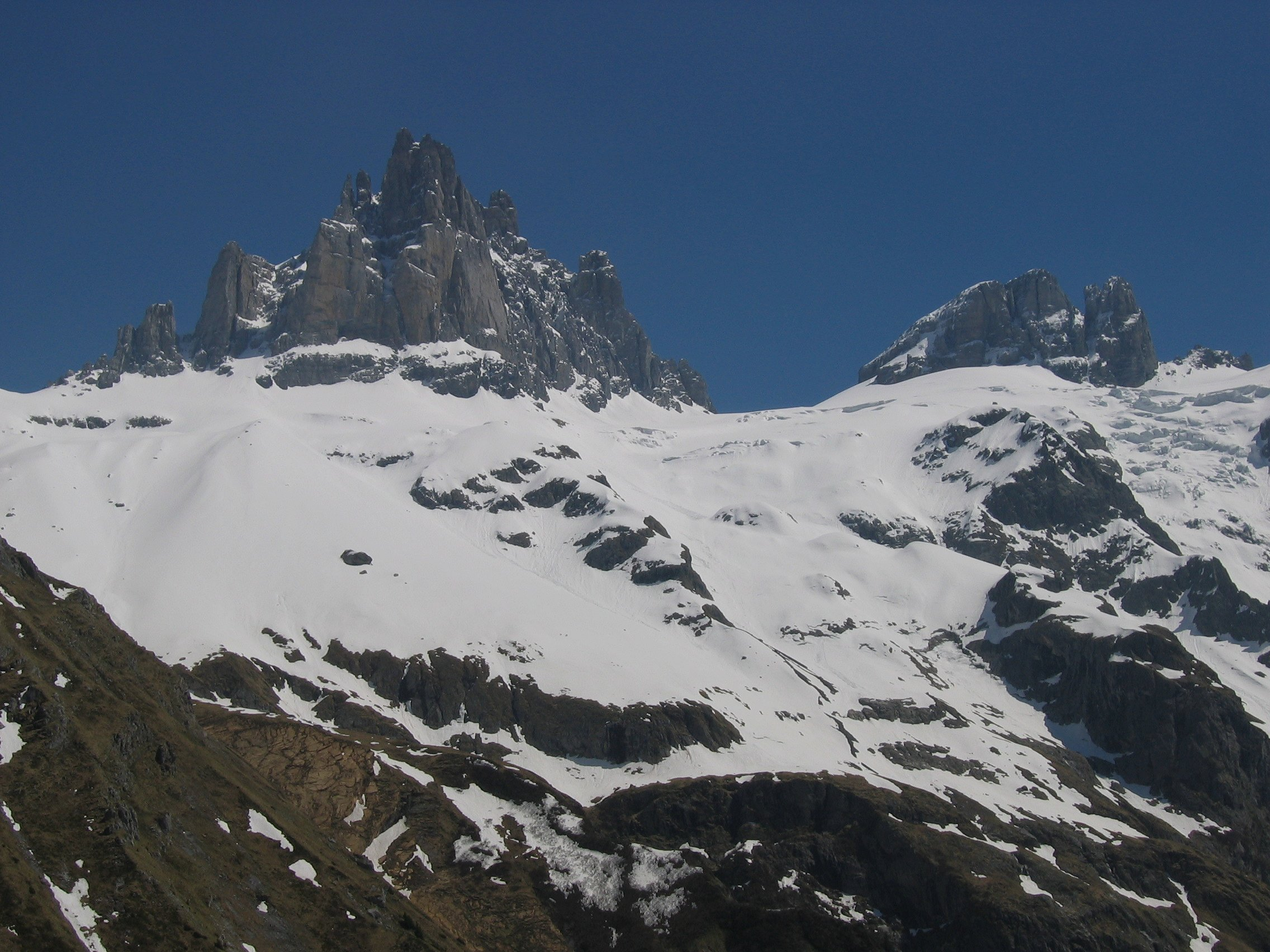
- Gross Spannort and Chli Spannort

Highest point
- Elevation: 3,140 m (10,300 ft)
- Prominence: 230 m (750 ft)
- Parent peak: Gross Spannort
- Coordinates: 46°46′49.3″N 08°31′00″E

Geography
- Location within Switzerland
- Location: Uri, Switzerland
- Parent range: Uri Alps

The Chli Spannort is a mountain of the Uri Alps, located between Engelberg and Meien, in the canton of Uri. It lies south-west of the Gross Spannort.
