= Rienzenstock =

Mountain in Switzerland

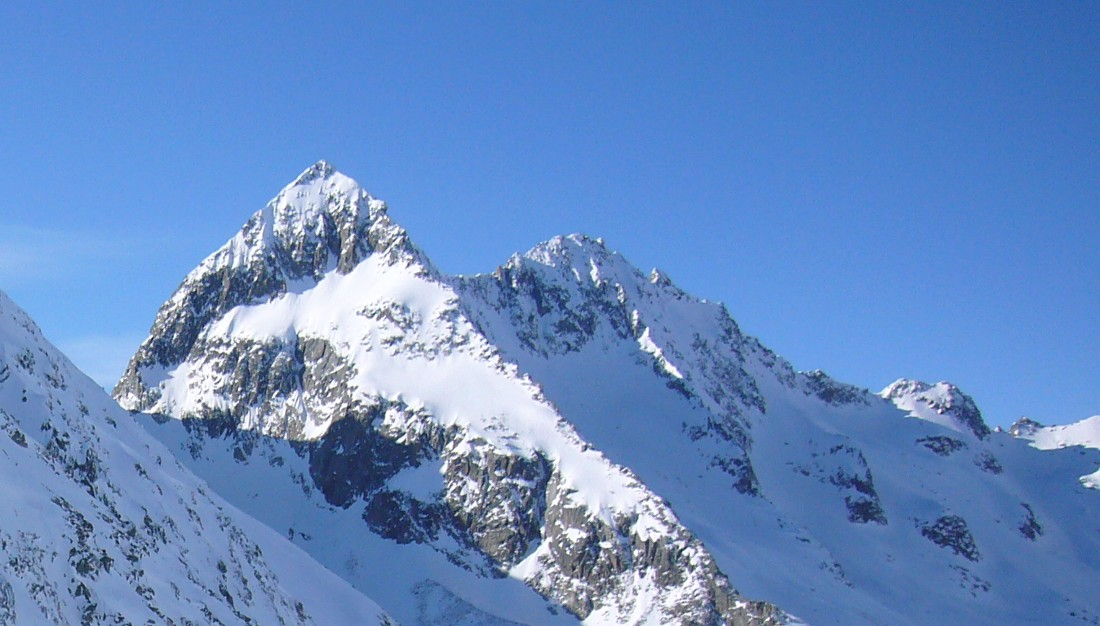
- Bächenstock (left) and Rienzenstock (centre)

Highest point
- Elevation: 2,962 m (9,718 ft)
- Prominence: 485 m (1,591 ft)
- Parent peak: Piz Giuv
- Coordinates: 46°40′59″N 8°38′7″E

Geography
- Location within Switzerland
- Location: Uri, Switzerland
- Parent range: Glarus Alps

The Rienzenstock (2,962 m) is a mountain in Switzerland of the Glarus Alps, overlooking the valley of the Reuss near Göschenen in the canton of Uri. It is the culminating point of the group lying west of the Fellilücke.
