= Piz Tremoggia =

Mountain in Switzerland

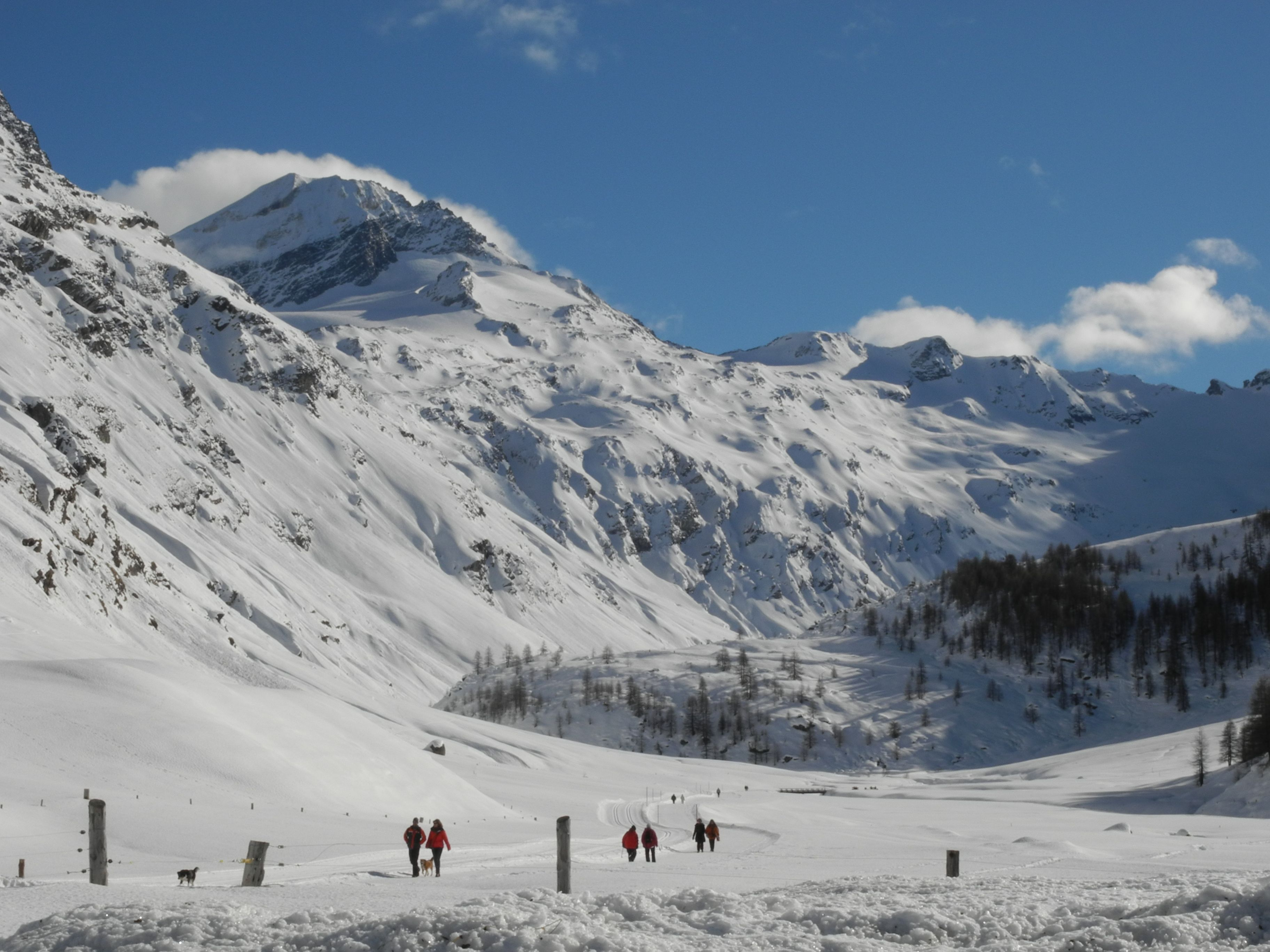
- Piz Tremoggia (left) from the Val Fex (north side)

Highest point
- Elevation: 3,441 m (11,289 ft)
- Prominence: 349 m (1,145 ft)
- Parent peak: Piz Bernina
- Listing: Alpine mountains above 3000 m
- Coordinates: 46°21′06″N 9°49′18″E

Geography
- Location within Alps
- Location: Graubünden, Switzerland; Lombardy, Italy
- Parent range: Bernina Range

Piz Tremoggia is a mountain in the Bernina Range of the Alps, located on the border between Italy and Switzerland. It lies between the Val Fex (Graubünden) and the Val Malenco (Lombardy).
