= Bürglen (Albis) =

Mountain in Switzerland

- Location within Switzerland

Highest point
- Elevation: 915 m (3,002 ft)
- Prominence: 375 m (1,230 ft)
- Parent peak: Wildspitz
- Isolation: 11.0 km (6.8 mi)
- Listing: Prominent mountains of Switzerland
- Coordinates: 47°15′28″N 8°32′14″E

Geography
- Location: Zurich, Switzerland
- Parent range: Albis

Climbing
- Easiest route: Trail

The Bürglen (915 m) is the highest mountain of the Albis, a wooded range stretching west of Lake Zurich in the Swiss canton of Zurich. It is located between Hausen am Albis and the valley of the Sihl.

The mountain is entirely traversed by a trail running along the crest. South of the Bürglen is the slightly lower summit of the Albishorn (909 m), where there is a panoramic restaurant.
