= Farneren =

Mountain in Switzerland

- Location within Switzerland

Highest point
- Elevation: 1,572 m (5,157 ft)
- Prominence: 312 m (1,024 ft)
- Parent peak: Fürstein
- Coordinates: 46°56′03″N 8°02′29″E

Geography
- Location: Lucerne, Switzerland
- Parent range: Emmental Alps

The Farneren is a mountain of the Emmental Alps, overlooking Schüpfheim in the canton of Lucerne.
