= Val Fex =

Valley in Switzerland

Coordinates: 46.413°N 9.764°E

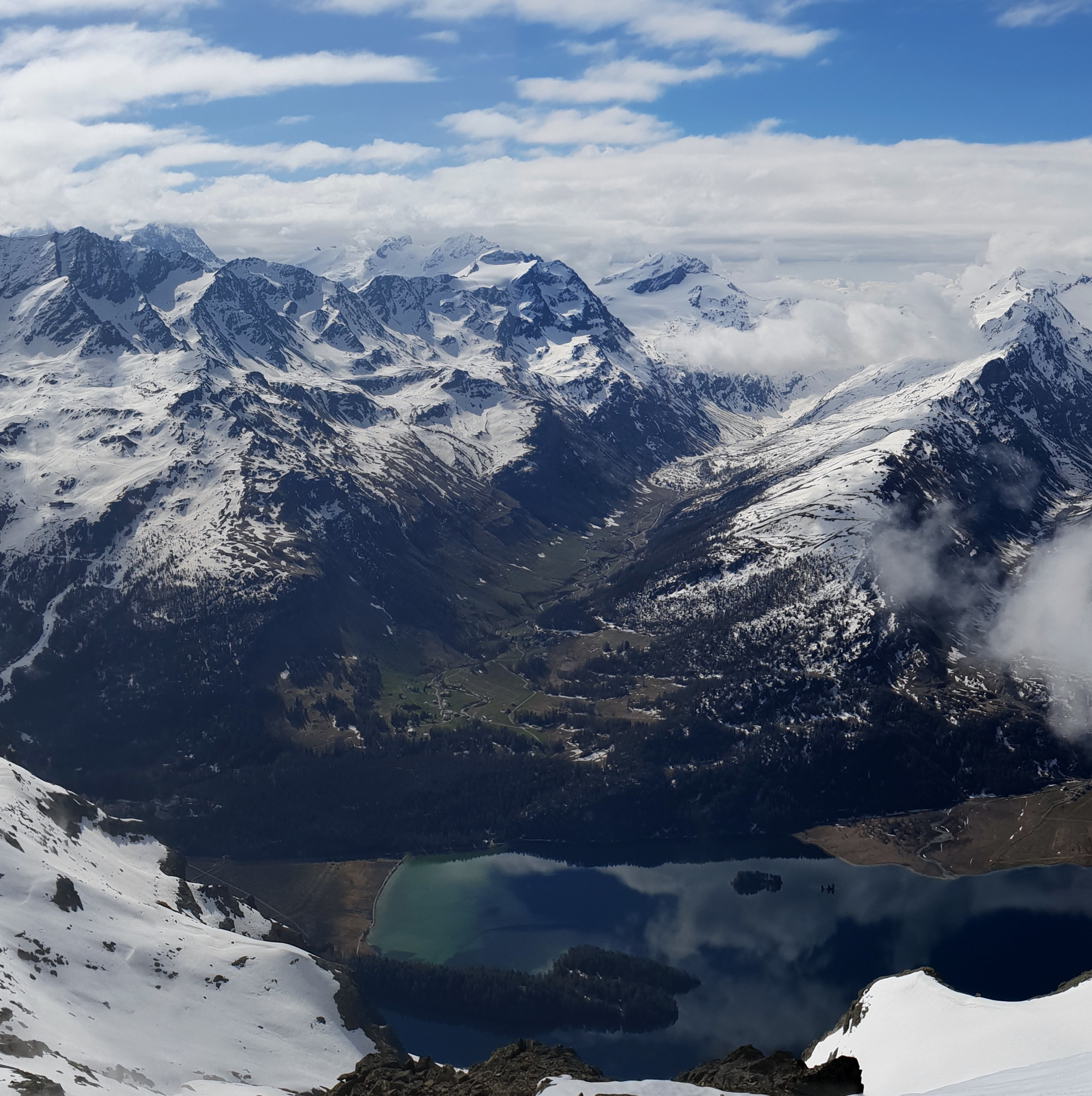
View from Piz Lagrev across Lake Sils into Val Fex

Val Fex (Romansh; German: Fextal) is a southern side valley from the Upper Engadine in Switzerland, located at an altitude of around 1,800 to 2,000 metres (5,900–6,600 feet) above sea level. It belongs to the municipality of Sils im Engadin/Segl.

There are a few small hamlets in the valley, such as Fex Platta, Fex Crasta, Vaüglia at its entrance, and Muot and Curtins on the half way. At the very end one finds the Alp Muot Selvas (2,070 m (6,790 ft)) at the former (about 150 years ago) foot of the glaciers.

The river Fedacla runs through the valley, starting at the feet of the three glaciers roughly from south to the north and enters the Lej da Silvaplauna in the Upper Engadine. The valley is dominated by several high Alpine mountains, Piz Corvatsch (3,451 m (11,322 ft)) to the east side of the valley, Il Chapütschin (3,386 m (11,109 ft)) in the far back of the valley, La Muongia (3,415 m (11,204 ft)) and Piz Tremoggia (3,441 m (11,289 ft)) above the glacier Vadret del Tremoggia, Piz Fora (3,363 m (11,033 ft)) above the glacier Vadret da Fex, and Piz Güz (3,166 m (10,387 ft)) and Piz Led (3,088 m (10,131 ft)) above the third glacier Vadret dal Güz.

The valley is car-free, except for those belonging to residents. There are two small guest houses / hotels in the valley. A popular local attraction is a tour of the valley by horse sleigh out of Sils, during both summer and winter.
