= Beichle =

Mountain in Switzerland

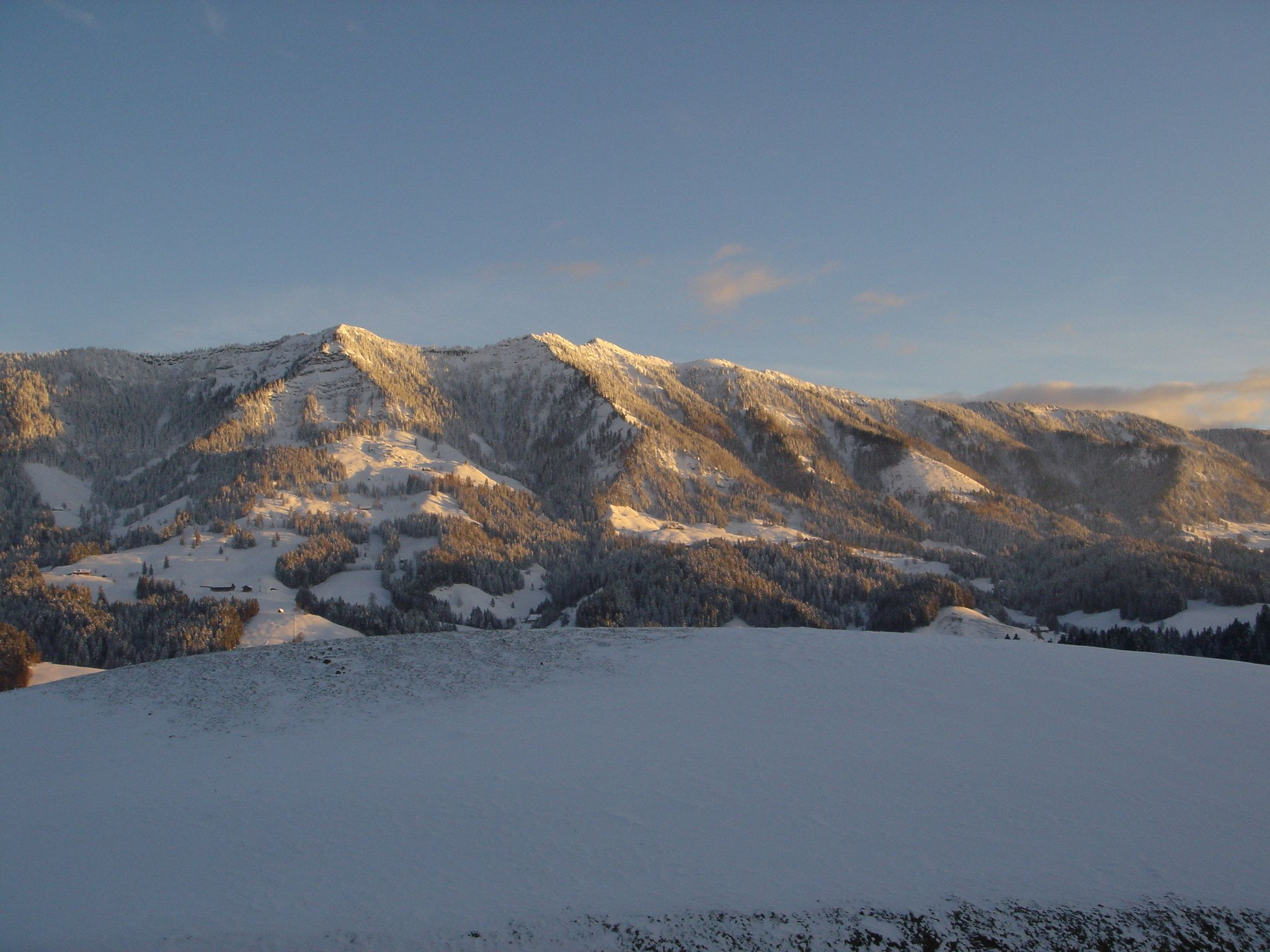
- Beichlen in winter.

Highest point
- Elevation: 1,770 m (5,810 ft)
- Prominence: 480 m (1,570 ft)
- Parent peak: Schrattenfluh
- Coordinates: 46°53′51″N 7°58′23″E

Geography
- Location within Switzerland
- Location: Lucerne, Switzerland
- Parent range: Emmental Alps

The Beichle is a mountain of the Emmental Alps, overlooking Escholzmatt in the canton of Lucerne.
