= Wisenberg =

Mountain in Switzerland

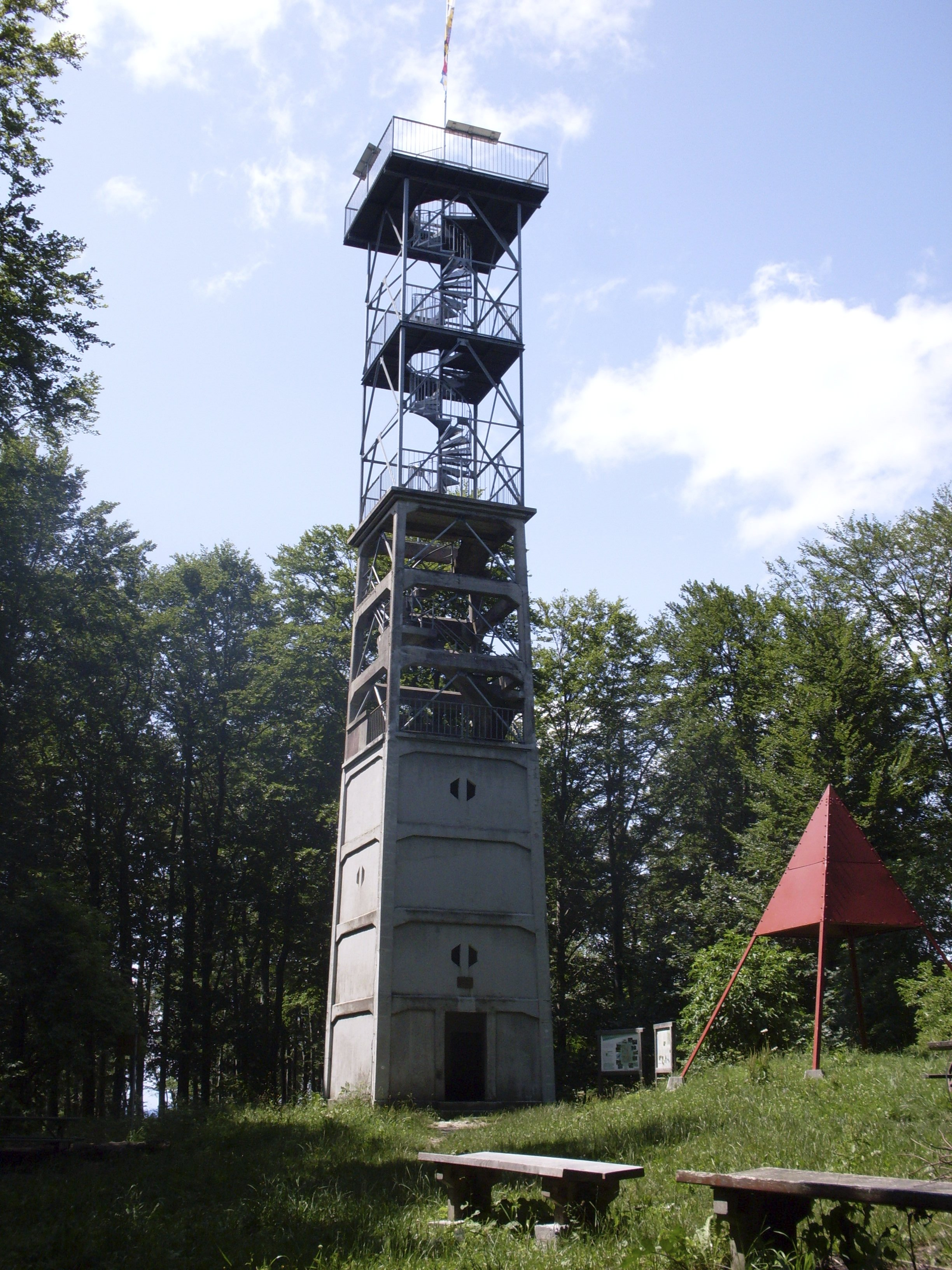
- The summit

Highest point
- Elevation: 1,002 m (3,287 ft)
- Prominence: 311 m (1,020 ft)
- Parent peak: Ruchen
- Coordinates: 47°24′09″N 7°52′54″E

Geography
- Location within Switzerland
- Location: Basel-Landschaft, Switzerland (near the Solothurn border)
- Parent range: Jura Mountains

Climbing
- Easiest route: Trail

The Wisenberg (1,002 m) is a wooded mountain of the Jura Mountains, located between Häfelfingen and Wisen in northern Switzerland. The summit lies within the canton of Basel-Landschaft, near the border with the canton of Solothurn. The Wisenberg is both the northernmost and easternmost summit above 1,000 metres in the Jura Mountains.

On the summit is an observation tower.
