= Cima di Bri =

Mountain in Switzerland

- Location within Switzerland

Highest point
- Elevation: 2,520 m (8,270 ft)
- Prominence: 313 m (1,027 ft)
- Parent peak: Madom Gröss
- Coordinates: 46°18′18.4″N 8°53′2.9″E

Geography
- Location: Ticino, Switzerland
- Parent range: Lepontine Alps

Cima di Bri is a mountain in the Lepontine Alps, located in the Swiss canton of Ticino. It is situated between Lavertezzo and Biasca, on the range that separates the valleys of Verzasca and Leventina. With an altitude of 2,520 metres, it is the highest summit of this chain south of Passo di Gagnone.
