= Stierenberg =

Mountain north of the Alps

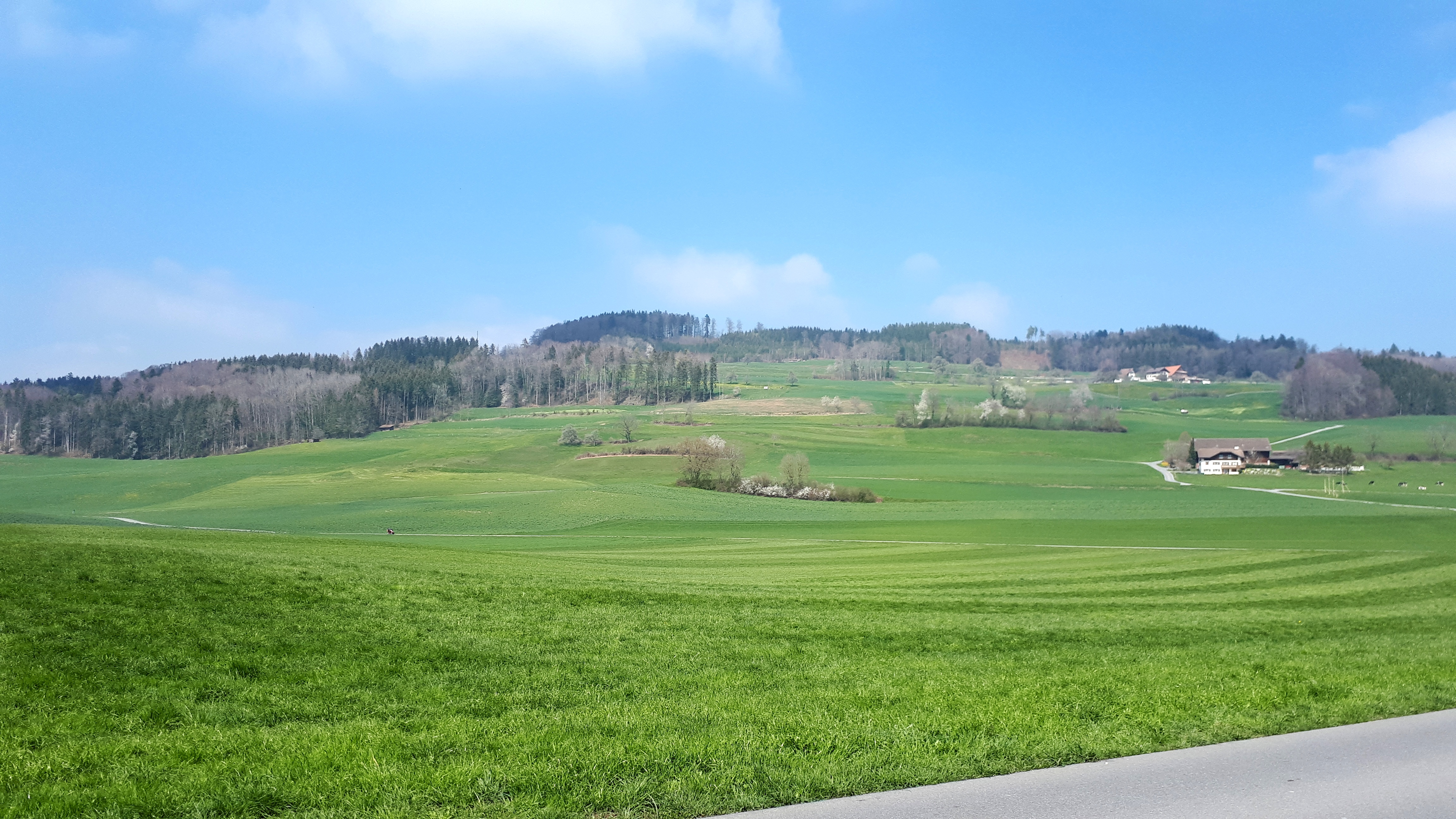
- Stierenberg seen from Rickenbach.

Highest point
- Elevation: 872 m (2,861 ft)
- Prominence: 332 m (1,089 ft)
- Parent peak: Napf
- Isolation: 10.3 km (6.4 mi)
- Coordinates: 47°14′18″N 8°09′32″E

Geography
- Location within Switzerland
- Location: Aargau, Switzerland (near the Lucerne border)

The Stierenberg (872 m) is a wooded mountain north of the Alps, located between the cantons of Aargau and Lucerne, with the summit being within the canton of Aargau. The Stierenberg is the highest summit between the valleys of the Suhre and Aabach.
