= Walenmatt =

Mountain in Switzerland

- Location within Switzerland

Highest point
- Elevation: 1,240 m (4,070 ft)
- Prominence: 445 m (1,460 ft)
- Parent peak: Mont Raimeux
- Coordinates: 47°17′03″N 7°29′07″E

Geography
- Location: Bern/Solothurn, Switzerland
- Parent range: Jura Mountains

Climbing
- Easiest route: Trail

The Walenmatt (or Walenmattweid) is a mountain of the Jura, located on the border between the Swiss cantons of Bern and Solothurn. It lies between Crémines and Welschenrohr.
