= Mont Raimeux =

Mountain in Switzerland

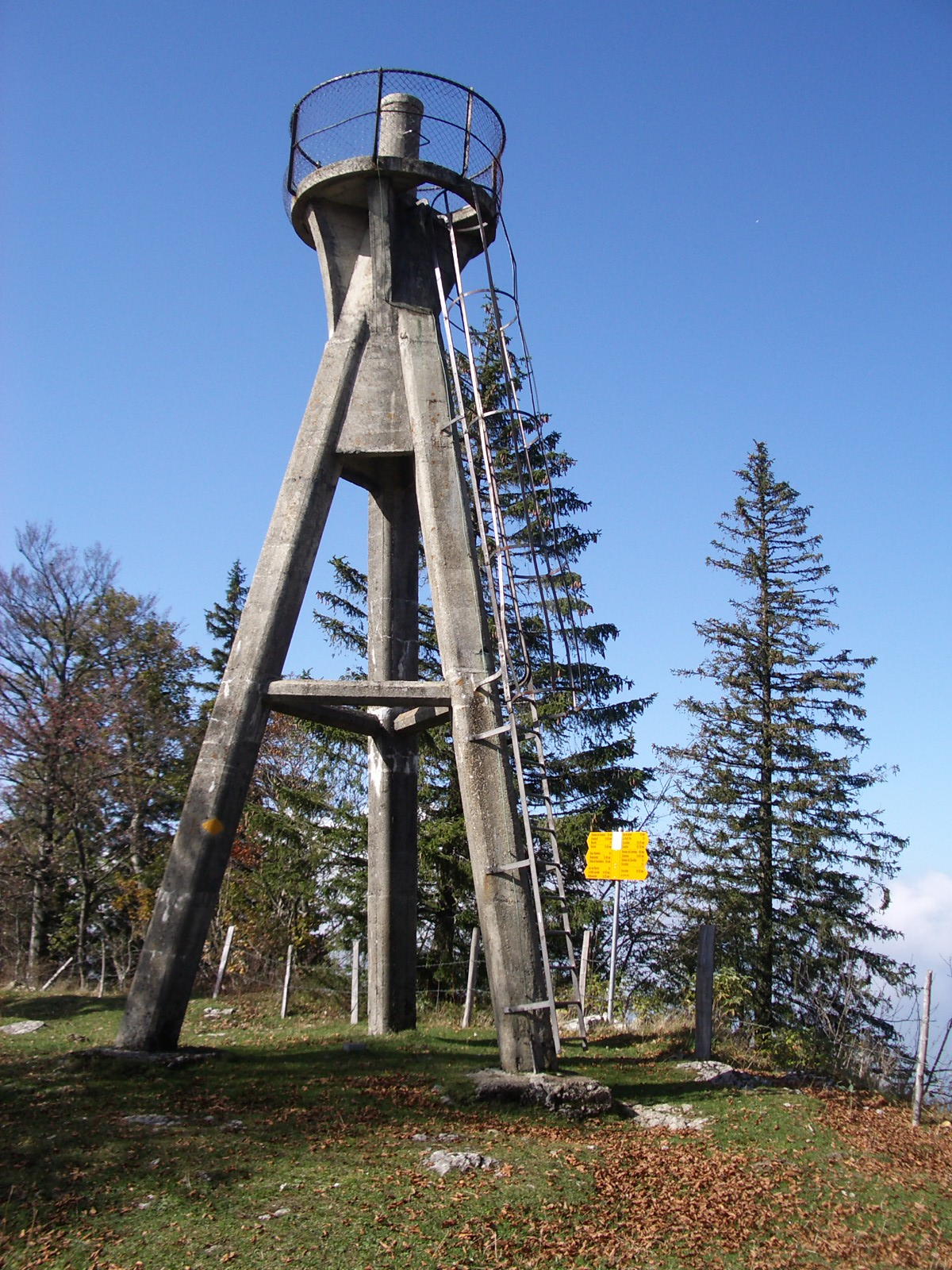

Highest point
- Elevation: 1,302 m (4,272 ft)
- Prominence: 533 m (1,749 ft)
- Isolation: 6.9 km (4.3 mi)
- Listing: Canton high point
- Coordinates: 47°18′30″N 7°25′45″E

Geography
- Location within Switzerland
- Location: Jura/Bern, Switzerland
- Parent range: Jura Mountains

Climbing
- Easiest route: Trail

Mont Raimeux is a mountain of the Jura range, located on the border between the Swiss cantons of Jura and Bern. Reaching a height of 1,302 metres above sea level, it is the highest summit in the canton of Jura.

The summit of Mont Raimeux can be reached easily by several trails and a road culminating at 1,288 metres.
