= Gross Spannort =

Mountain in Switzerland

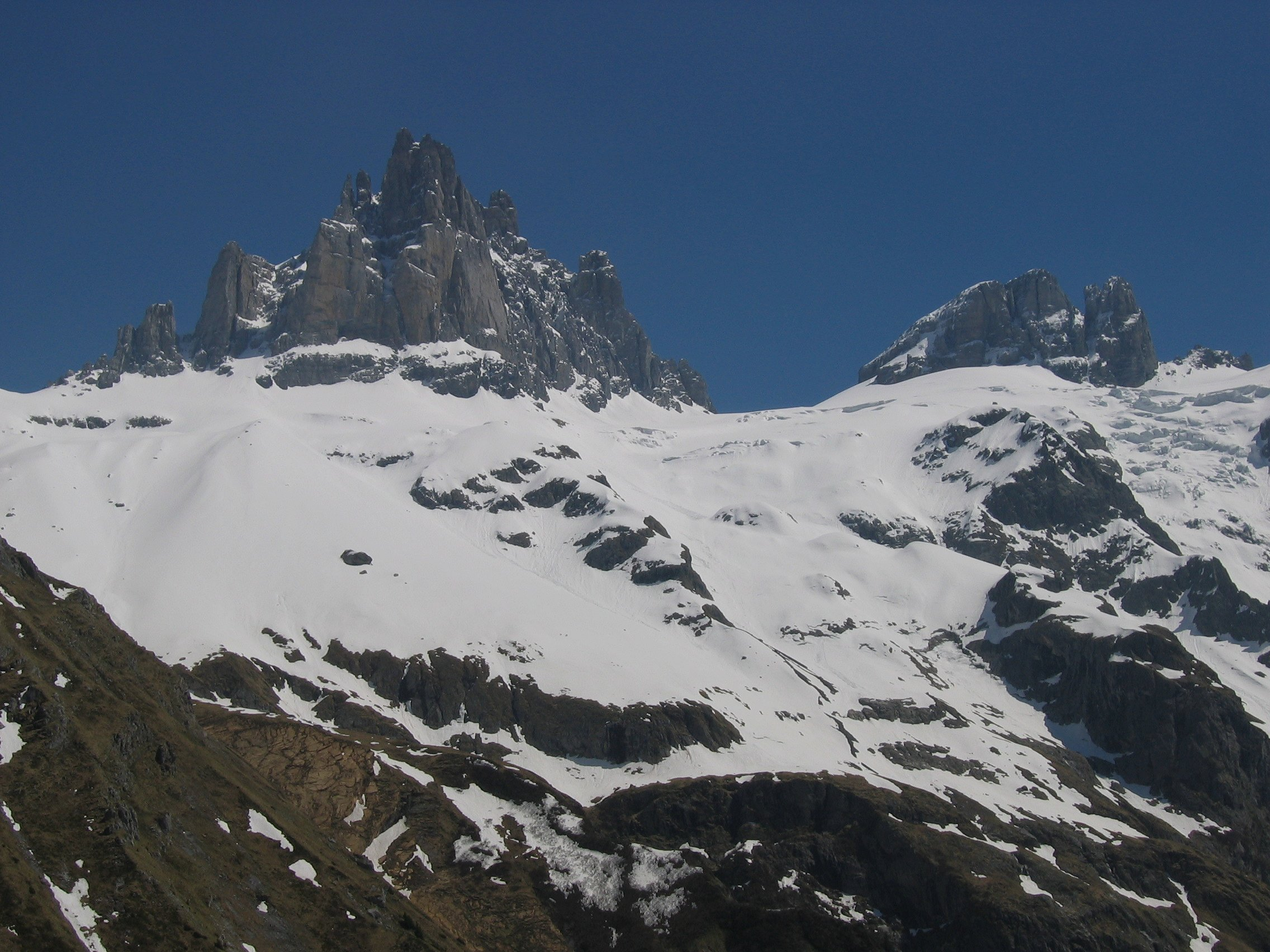

Highest point
- Elevation: 3,198 m (10,492 ft)
- Prominence: 616 m (2,021 ft)
- Parent peak: Titlis
- Listing: Alpine mountains above 3000 m
- Coordinates: 46°47′11.8″N 08°31′29.5″E

Geography
- Location within Switzerland
- Location: Uri, Switzerland
- Parent range: Uri Alps

The Gross Spannort is a mountain of the Uri Alps, located between Engelberg and Erstfeld in Central Switzerland. It is located within the canton of Uri, although its summit lies on the watershed between the Engelberger Aa and the main Reuss valley. The Gross Spannort is almost entirely surrounded by glaciers, the largest being the Glatt Firn. South-west of the Gross Spannort is the Chli Spannort ("little Spannort").
