= Monte Zucchero =

Mountain in Switzerland

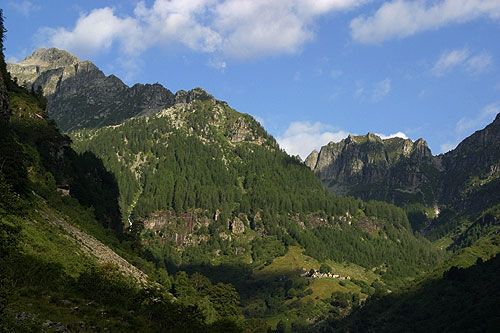
- Monte Zucchero (left) from the Val Redorta

Highest point
- Elevation: 2,735 m (8,973 ft)
- Prominence: 554 m (1,818 ft)
- Parent peak: Dammastock
- Coordinates: 46°21′15″N 8°42′51″E

Naming
- Native name: Zuccar (Lombard)

Geography
- Location within Switzerland
- Location: Ticino, Switzerland
- Parent range: Lepontine Alps

Monte Zucchero (Italian: [ˈmonte dˈdzukkero, - tˈtsuk-]; Ticinese: Zuccar [ˈtsykar]) is a mountain in the Lepontine Alps of Switzerland, located between Bignasco and Sonogno in the canton of Ticino. Reaching a height of 2,735 metres above sea level, Monte Zucchero is the highest summit on the range south of the Passo di Redorta, that separates the Valle Maggia from the Valle Verzasca.
