= Madom Gröss =

Mountain in Switzerland

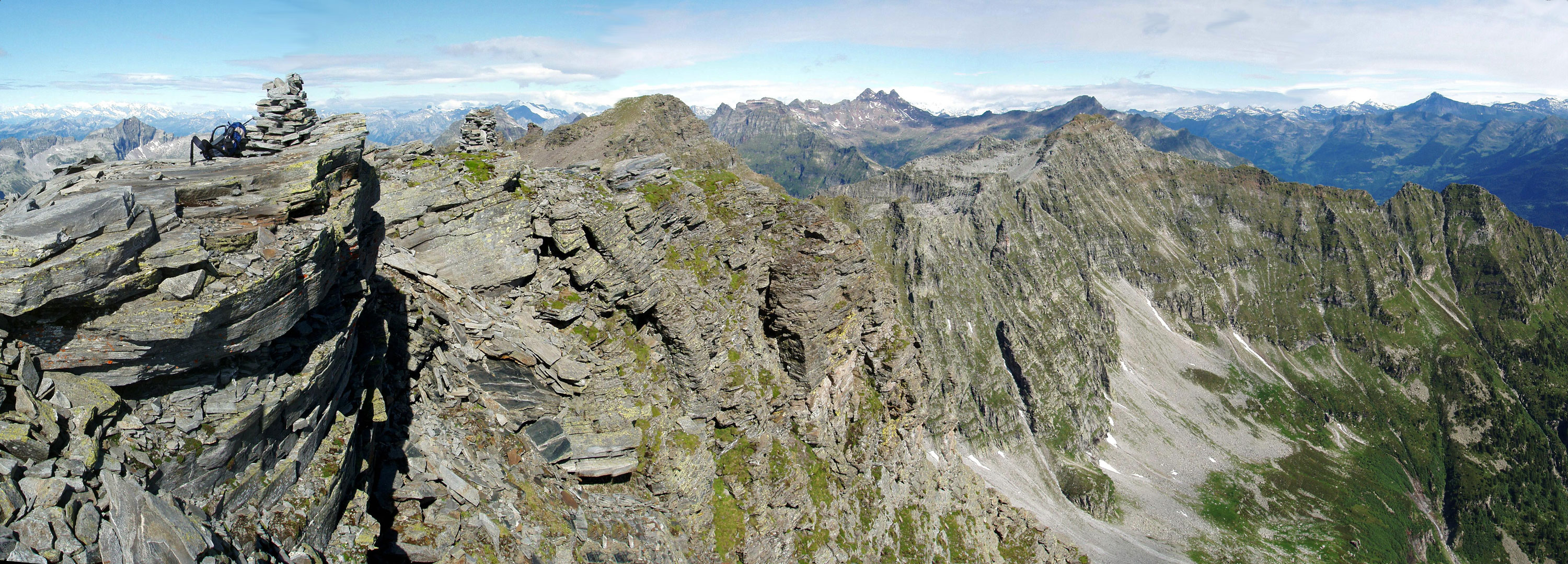
- View from Pizzo Cramosino to the Madom Gröss (centre)

Highest point
- Elevation: 2,741 m (8,993 ft)
- Prominence: 630 m (2,070 ft)
- Parent peak: Finsteraarhorn
- Coordinates: 46°22′00″N 08°49′52.5″E

Geography
- Location within Switzerland
- Location: Ticino, Switzerland
- Parent range: Lepontine Alps

The Madom Gröss is a mountain in the Lepontine Alps of Switzerland. It is located between the Valle Verzasca and Valle Leventina, near Sonogno, Ticino.
