= Gadmen =

- Former municipality
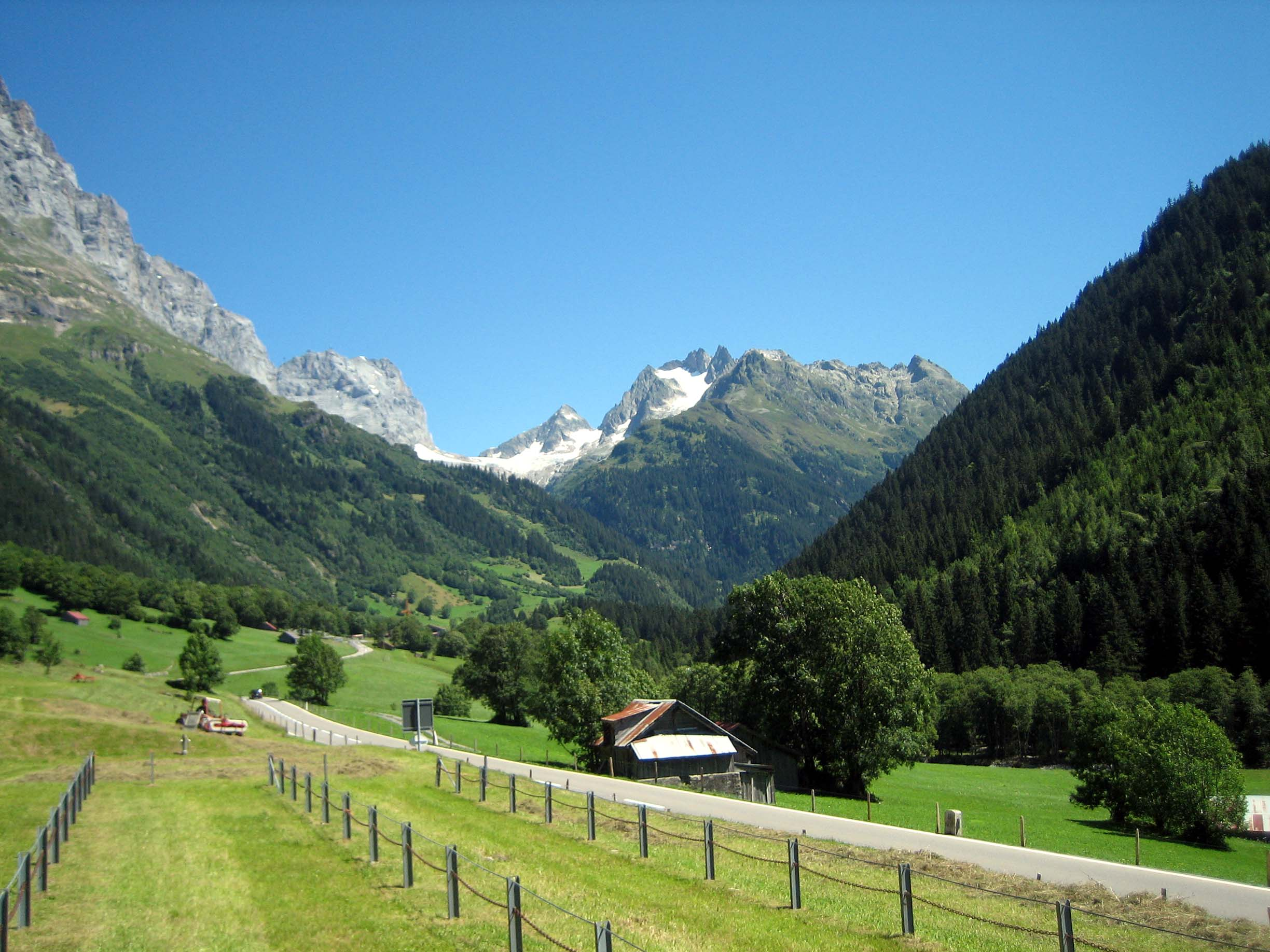
- Valley of Gadmen

- Flag Coat of arms
- Location of Gadmen
- Location within Switzerland Location within Canton of Bern
- Coordinates: 46°44′N 8°20′E
- Country: Switzerland
- Canton: Bern
- District: Interlaken-Oberhasli

Government
  - Mayor: Barbara Kehrli

Area
  - Total: 116.4 km^{2} (44.9 sq mi)
- Elevation: 1,205 m (3,953 ft)

Population (Dec 2011)
  - Total: 228
  - Density: 1.96/km^{2} (5.07/sq mi)
- Time zone: UTC+01:00 (CET)
  - Summer (DST): UTC+02:00 (CEST)
- Postal code: 3863
- SFOS number: 781
- ISO 3166 code: CH-BE
- Surrounded by: Engelberg (OW), Göschenen (UR), Guttannen, Innertkirchen, Oberwald (VS), Wassen (UR)
- Twin towns: Volketswil (Switzerland)
- Website: www.gadmen.ch

Gadmen is a small village and a former municipality in the Interlaken-Oberhasli administrative district in the canton of Bern in Switzerland.

On 1 January 2014, the former municipality of Gadmen merged into the municipality of Innertkirchen.

The name Gadmen comes from the Old High German "gadum," meaning barn or small house, and was first mentioned in 1382.

The municipality is in a municipal partnership with Volketswil in the Canton of Zürich.

== History ==
Aerial view (1956)

Gadmen is first mentioned in 1382 as im Gadmen.

During the Middle Ages, the Gadmen area was part of the Vogtei of Hasli and part of the Meiringen parish. In 1334 the entire Vogtei was acquired by Bern. During the Middle Ages a chapel was built in the village. In 1713 Gadmen became part of the parish of Innertkirchen and in 1722 the chapel expanded into a filial church. In 1816 the church became a parish church and Gadmen became an independent parish.

The residents of the village generally lived on farming, seasonal alpine herding and from traffic over the Susten Pass. During the 19th century, the farms became increasingly mechanized and many residents were forced to emigrate to North America for jobs. The construction of the Susten Road in 1939-45 opened up the village to tourism and provided additional jobs. During construction and after its completion, the Oberhasli AG power plant became the largest employer in the municipality.

== Geography ==
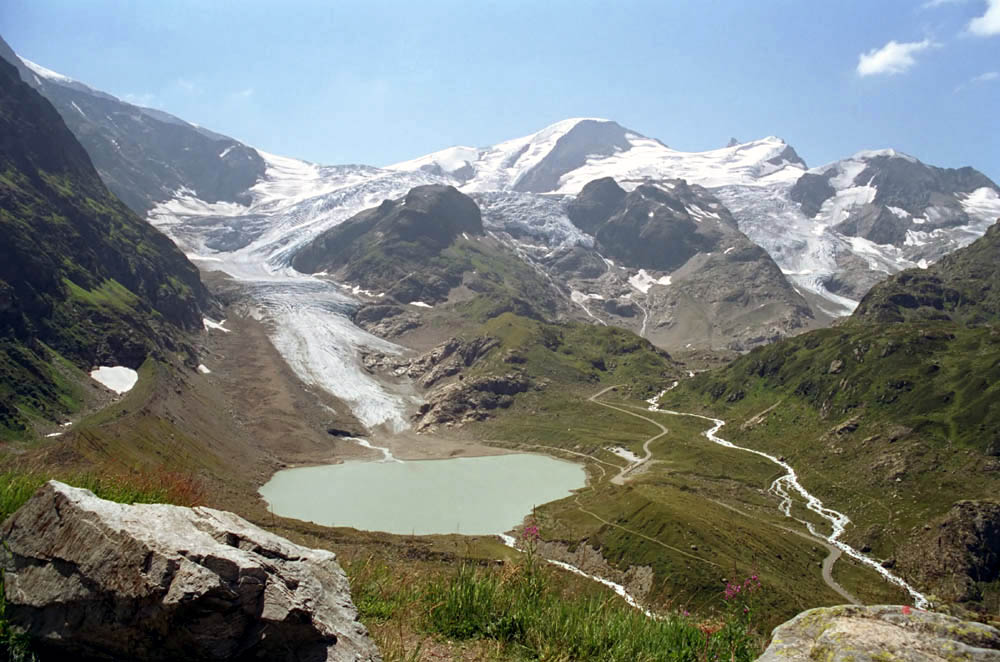
View of Steinsee and Gadmen from the Susten Pass

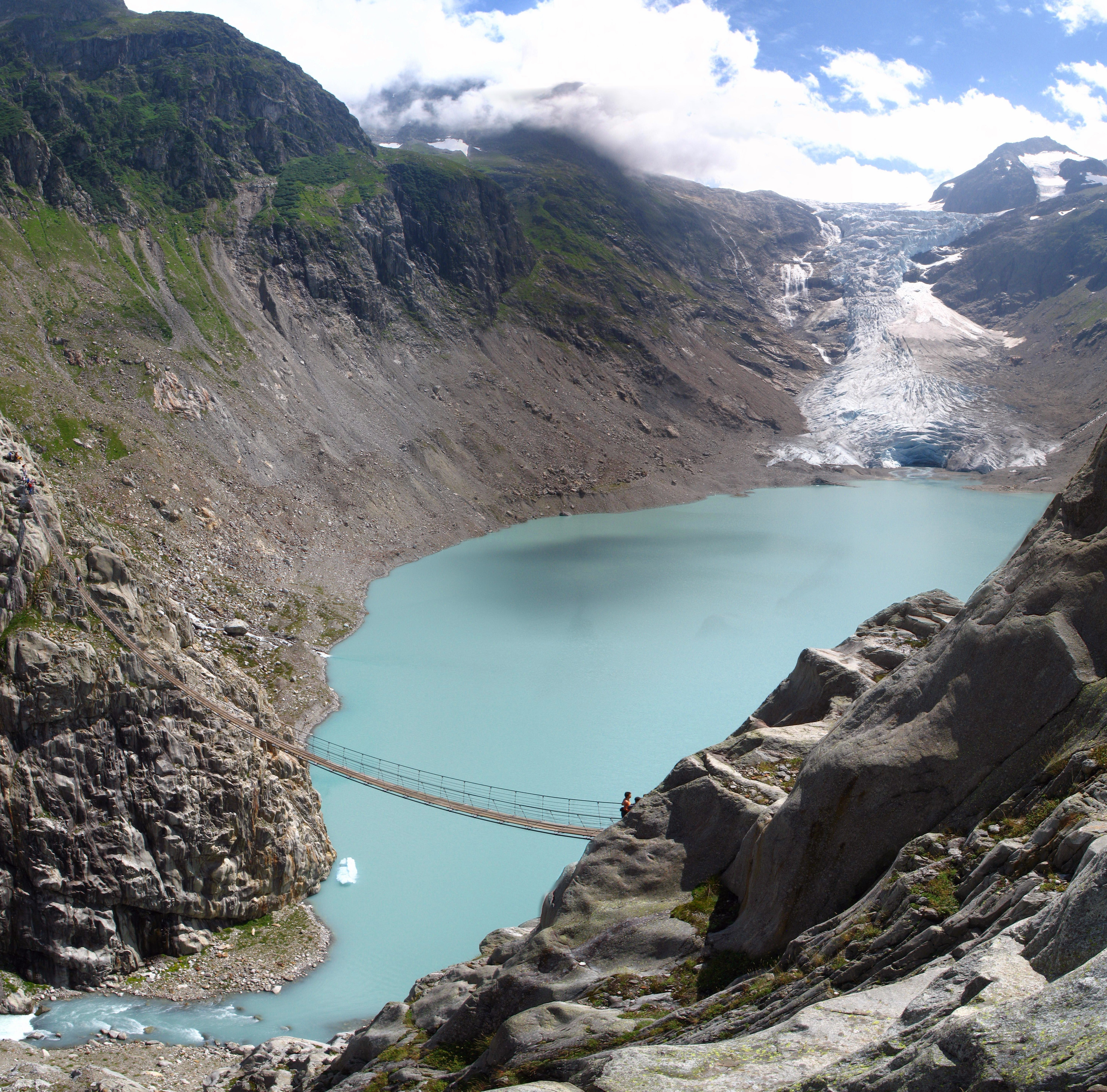
Trift Glacier and lake in Gadmen

Before the merger, Gadmen had a total area of 116.6 km^{2} (45.0 mi^{2}). As of 2012, a total of 9.62 km^{2} (3.71 mi^{2}) or 8.3% is used for agricultural purposes, while 19.48 km^{2} (7.52 mi^{2}) or 16.7% is forested. The rest of the municipality is 0.75 km^{2} (0.29 mi^{2}) or 0.6% is settled (buildings or roads), 1.52 km^{2} (0.59 mi^{2}) or 1.3% is either rivers or lakes and 85.19 km^{2} (32.89 mi^{2}) or 73.1% is unproductive land.

During the same year, housing and buildings made up 0.1% and transportation infrastructure made up 0.4%. All of the forested land area is covered with heavy forests. Of the agricultural land, 1.7% is pasturage and 6.5% is used for alpine pastures. Of the water in the municipality, 0.4% is in lakes and 0.9% is in rivers and streams. Of the unproductive areas, 13.3% is unproductive vegetation, 33.0% is too rocky for vegetation and 26.8% of the land is covered by glaciers.

On 31 December 2009, Amtsbezirk Oberhasli, the municipality's former district, was dissolved. On the following day, 1 January 2010, it joined the newly created Verwaltungskreis Interlaken-Oberhasli.

Gadmen lies in the Bernese Oberland, and the Susten Pass lies on the eastern border of the municipality. It lies in the Gadmer watershed. The municipal borders stretch from the valley floor, with an elevation of 850–1,250 m (2,790–4,100 ft), up to the nearby mountain peaks at about 3,500 m (11,500 ft). It is located on the border of the Canton of Bern with the Cantons of Obwalden, Nidwalden, Uri and Valais. The neighboring municipalities are Engelberg, Wassen, Göschenen, Guttannen, Innertkirchen and Kerns.

There are three glaciers in Gadmen, the Stein Glacier, the Trift Glacier and the Wenden Glacier. Beneath the Stein Glacier is Lake Stein. The most famous mountain in Gadmen is the Titlis.

== Coat of arms ==
The blazon of the municipal coat of arms is Or a Bar Gules in chief an Eagle displayed Sable crowned, beaked, langued and membered of the first and in base an Alpine Hut of the third.

== Demographics ==
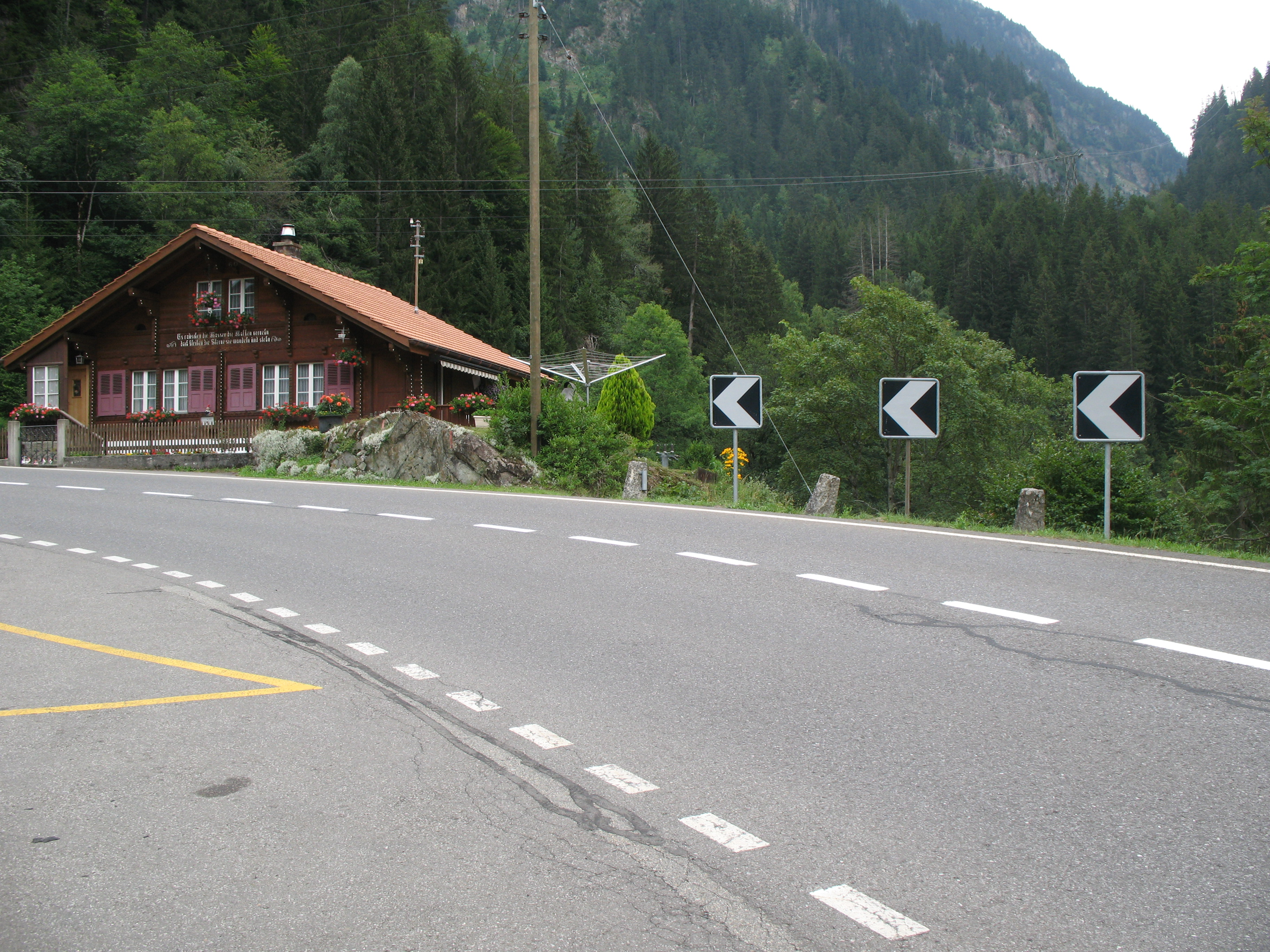
A Postauto station in Gadmen

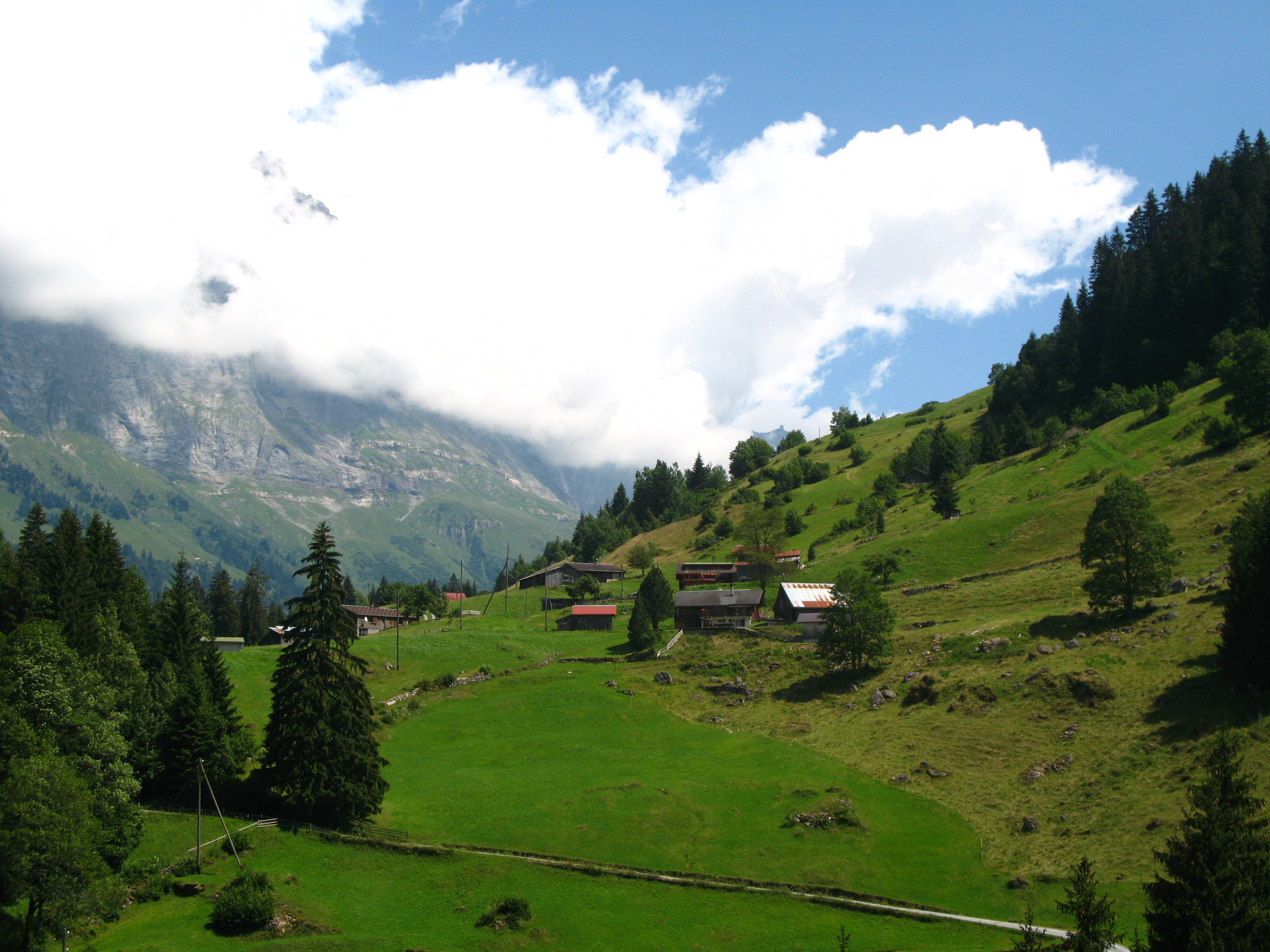
Houses in Gadmen

Gadmen had a population (as of 2011) of 228. As of 2011, 3.1% of the population are resident foreign nationals. Over the last year (2010-2011) the population has changed at a rate of -1.7%. Migration accounted for 1.7%, while births and deaths accounted for -3.0%.

Most of the population (as of 2000) speaks German (268 or 98.5%) as their first language, while one person each speaks French and Spanish.

As of 2008, the population was 53.4% male and 46.6% female. The population was made up of 123 Swiss men (53.0% of the population) and 1 (0.4%) non-Swiss men. There were 102 Swiss women (44.0%) and 6 (2.6%) non-Swiss women. Of the population in the municipality, 162 or about 59.6% were born in Gadmen and lived there in 2000. There were 42 or 15.4% who were born in the same canton, while 32 or 11.8% were born somewhere else in Switzerland, and 28 or 10.3% were born outside of Switzerland.

As of 2011, children and teenagers (0–19 years old) make up 14.5% of the population, while adults (20–64 years old) make up 61% and seniors (over 64 years old) make up 24.6%.

As of 2000, there were 102 people who were single and never married in the municipality. There were 144 married individuals, 22 widows or widowers and 4 individuals who are divorced.

As of 2010, there were 43 households that consist of only one person and 7 households with five or more people. In 2000, a total of 100 apartments (67.1% of the total) were permanently occupied, while 35 apartments (23.5%) were seasonally occupied and 14 apartments (9.4%) were empty. As of 2010, the construction rate of new housing units was 4.3 new units per 1000 residents. The vacancy rate for the municipality, in 2010, was 3.39%. In 2011, single family homes made up 70.8% of the total housing in the municipality.

The historical population is given in the following chart:

== Politics ==
In the 2011 federal election the most popular party was the Swiss People's Party (SVP) which received 35.7% of the vote. The next three most popular parties were the Conservative Democratic Party (BDP) (29.4%), the Social Democratic Party (SP) (13.2%) and the FDP.The Liberals (7.4%). In the federal election, a total of 72 votes were cast, and the voter turnout was 34.0%.

== Economy ==
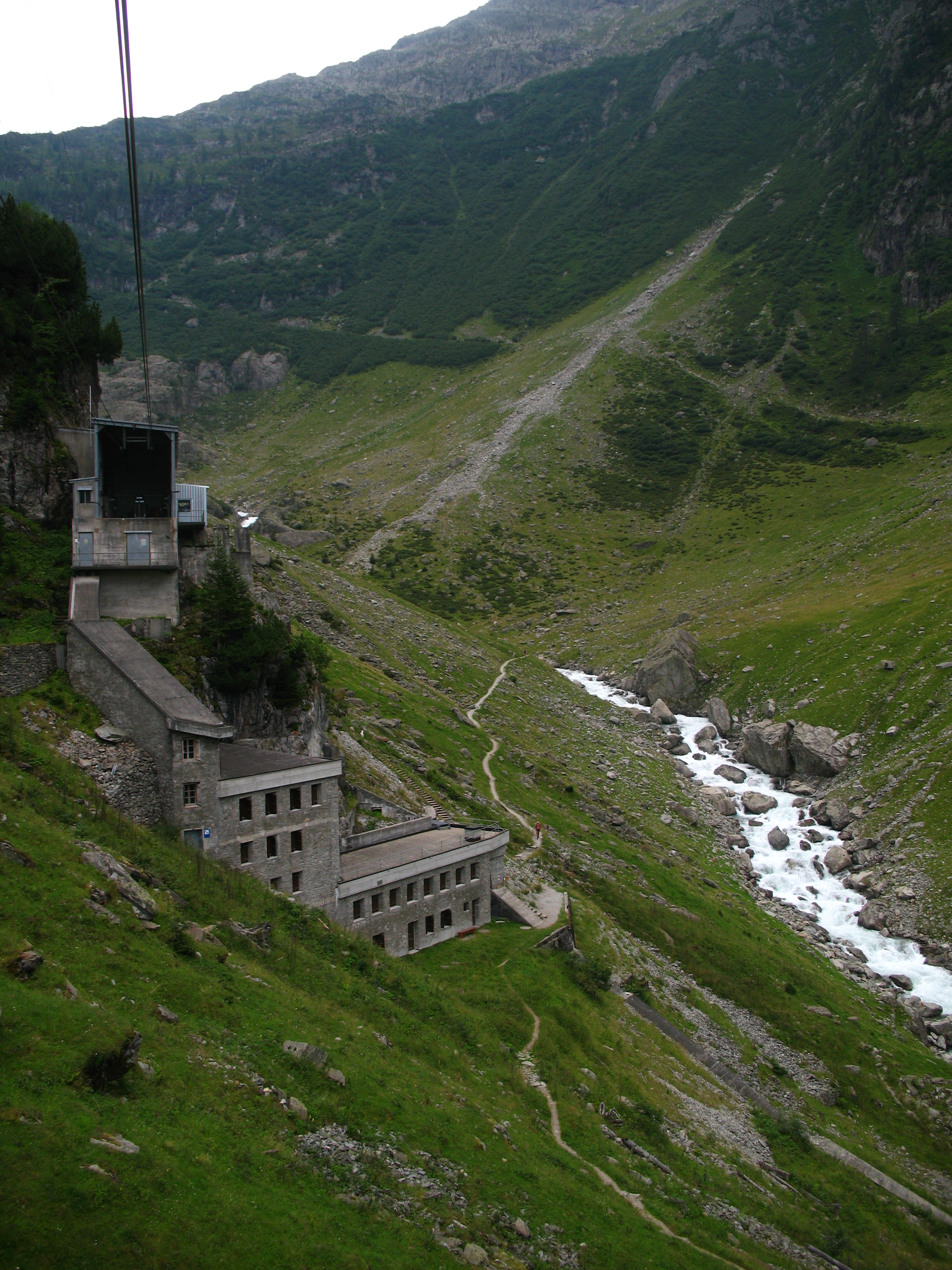
Triftbahn (aerial lift) top station, near the Trift glacier

The largest industries are tourism and agriculture.

As of 2011, Gadmen had an unemployment rate of 0.37%. As of 2008, there were a total of 100 people employed in the municipality. Of these, there were 37 people employed in the primary economic sector and about 17 businesses involved in this sector. 14 people were employed in the secondary sector and there were 4 businesses in this sector. 49 people were employed in the tertiary sector, with 11 businesses in this sector. There were 107 residents of the municipality who were employed in some capacity, of which females made up 37.4% of the workforce.

In 2008 there were a total of 70 full-time equivalent jobs. The number of jobs in the primary sector was 20, all in agriculture. The number of jobs in the secondary sector was 13 of which 5 or (38.5%) were in manufacturing. The number of jobs in the tertiary sector was 37. In the tertiary sector; 2 or 5.4% were in wholesale or retail sales or the repair of motor vehicles, 2 or 5.4% were in the movement and storage of goods, 29 or 78.4% were in a hotel or restaurant, 1 was in education and 2 or 5.4% were in health care.

In 2000, there were 7 workers who commuted into the municipality and 47 workers who commuted away. The municipality is a net exporter of workers, with about 6.7 workers leaving the municipality for every one entering. A total of 60 workers (89.6% of the 67 total workers in the municipality) both lived and worked in Gadmen. Of the working population, 11.2% used public transportation to get to work, and 52.3% used a private car.

In 2011 the average local and cantonal tax rate on a married resident, with two children, of Gadmen making 150,000 CHF was 13.3%, while an unmarried resident's rate was 19.6%. For comparison, the average rate for the entire canton in the same year, was 14.2% and 22.0%, while the nationwide average was 12.3% and 21.1% respectively.

In 2009 there were a total of 97 tax payers in the municipality. Of that total, 13 made over 75,000 CHF per year. There were 3 people who made between 15,000 and 20,000 per year. The greatest number of workers, 25, made between 50,000 and 75,000 CHF per year. The average income of the over 75,000 CHF group in Gadmen was 89,592 CHF, while the average across all of Switzerland was 130,478 CHF.

In 2011 a total of 0.9% of the population received direct financial assistance from the government.

== Religion ==
From the 2000 census, 226 or 83.1% belonged to the Swiss Reformed Church, while 34 or 12.5% were Roman Catholic. Of the rest of the population, there was 1 member of an Orthodox church, and there were 2 individuals (or about 0.74% of the population) who belonged to another Christian church. There was 1 individual who was Muslim. 5 (or about 1.84% of the population) belonged to no church, are agnostic or atheist, and 3 individuals (or about 1.10% of the population) did not answer the question.

== Climate ==
Between 1981 and 2010 Gadmen had an average of 152.6 days of rain or snow per year and on average received 1,644 mm (64.7 in) of precipitation. The wettest month was July during which time Gadmen received an average of 181 mm (7.1 in) of rain or snow. During this month there was precipitation for an average of 14.6 days. The month with the most days of precipitation was June, with an average of 15.6, but with only 173 mm (6.8 in) of rain or snow. The driest month of the year was October with an average of 108 mm (4.3 in) of precipitation over 10 days.

== Education ==
In Gadmen about 46.2% of the population have completed non-mandatory upper secondary education, and 4.9% have completed additional higher education (either university or a Fachhochschule). Of the 7 who had completed some form of tertiary schooling listed in the census, 57.1% were Swiss men, 42.9% were Swiss women.

The Canton of Bern school system provides one year of non-obligatory Kindergarten, followed by six years of Primary school. This is followed by three years of obligatory lower Secondary school where the students are separated according to ability and aptitude. Following the lower Secondary students may attend additional schooling or they may enter an apprenticeship.

During the 2011–12 school year, there were a total of 10 students attending classes in Gadmen. There were no kindergarten classes and only one primary class with all 10 students.

As of 2000, there were a total of 28 students attending any school in the municipality. During the same year, 5 residents attended schools outside the municipality.
