= Grassen =

Mountain in Switzerland

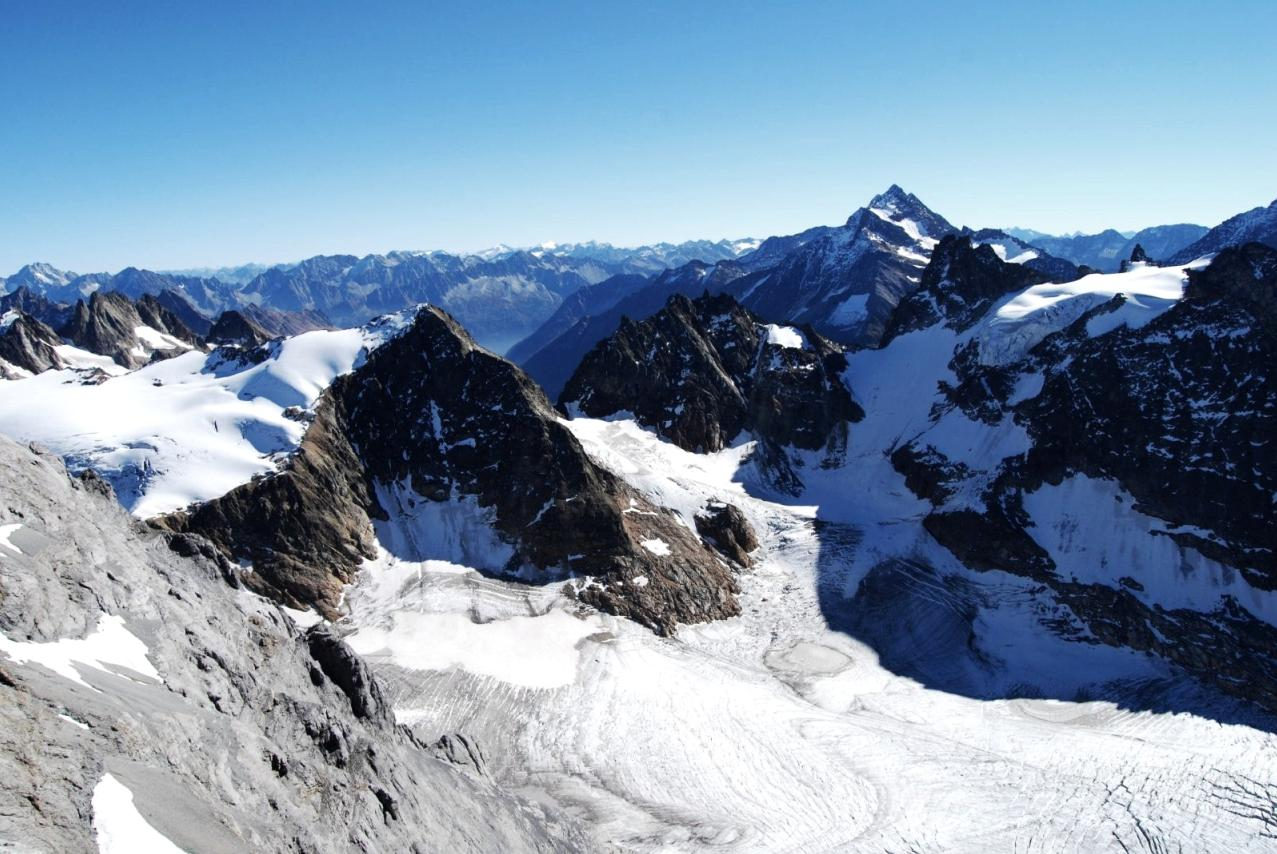
- Grassen (centre left) from Titlis

Highest point
- Elevation: 2,946 m (9,665 ft)
- Prominence: 146 m (479 ft)
- Parent peak: Wichelplanggstock
- Coordinates: 46°45′48.3″N 8°26′54″E

Naming
- Language of name: German

Geography
- Location within Switzerland
- Country: Switzerland
- Cantons: Bern, Obwalden and Uri
- Parent range: Urner Alps
- Topo map: Swiss Federal Office of Topography swisstopo

The Grassen is a mountain of the Urner Alps, located east of the Titlis in Central Switzerland. The summit is the tripoint between the cantons of Bern, Obwalden and Uri.
