= Nollen =

Nollen is both a surname and a given name. Notable people with the name include:

- Maike Nollen (born 1977), German canoer
- Nollen Cornelius Leni, Solomon Islands politician
- Scott Allen Nollen (born 1963), American author

== See also ==
- Reissend Nollen, Swiss mountain
