= Grassengrat =

Mountain in Switzerland

- Stössenstock
- Location within Switzerland

Highest point
- Elevation: 2,941 m (9,649 ft)
- Prominence: 91 m (299 ft)
- Parent peak: Wichelplanggstock
- Coordinates: 46°46′3.9″N 8°28′22.3″E

Geography
- Location: Obwalden/Uri, Switzerland
- Parent range: Urner Alps

The Grassengrat is a multi-summited mountain of the Urner Alps, located on the border between the cantons of Obwalden and Uri in Central Switzerland. It lies on the range between the Titlis and the Gross Spannort. The main summit has an elevation of 2,941 metres and is named Stössenstock.
