= Titlis =

Mountain of the Uri Alps

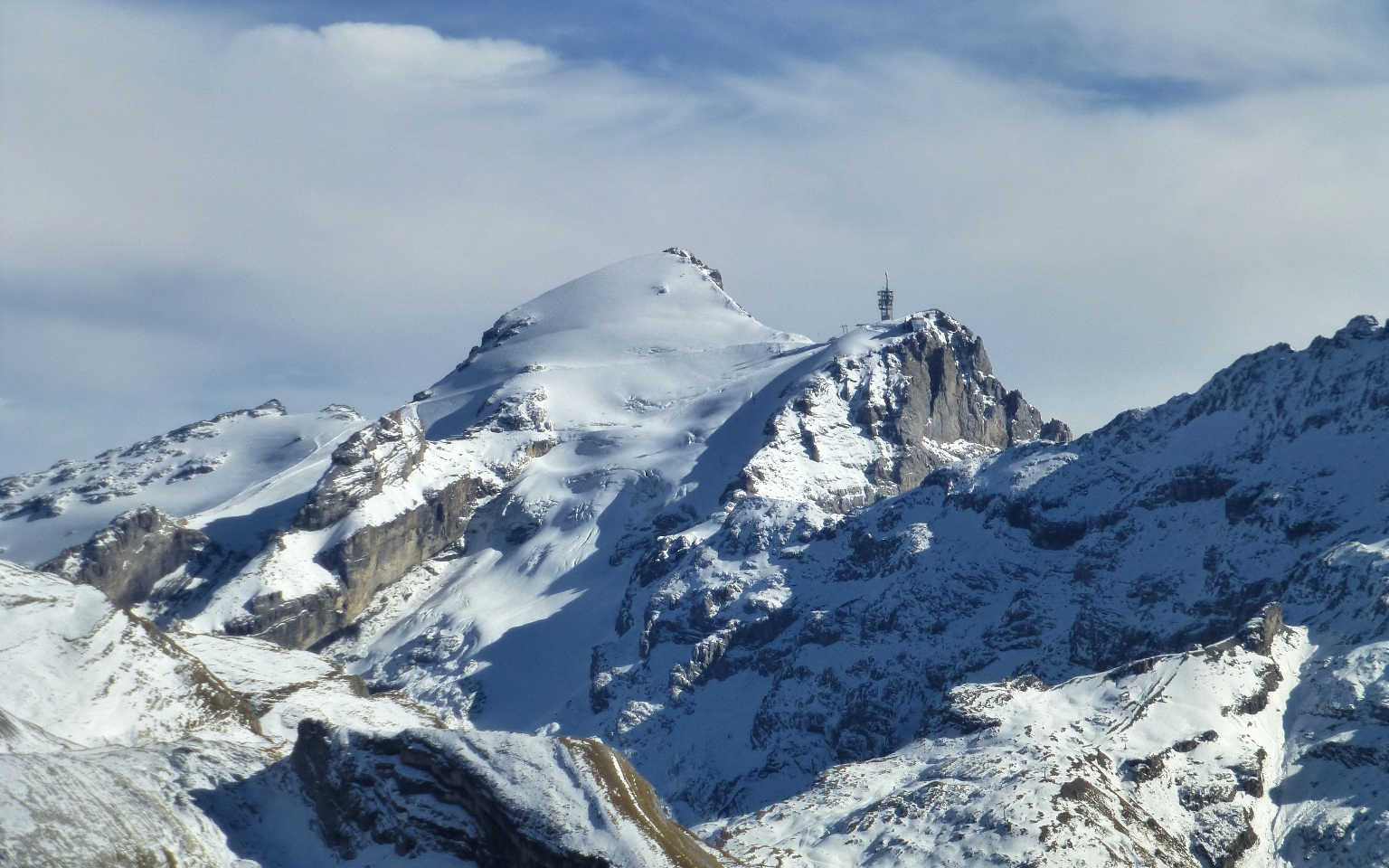
- Titlis and Klein Titlis (right) from the northwest

Highest point
- Elevation: 3,238 m (10,623 ft)
- Prominence: 978 m (3,209 ft)
- Parent peak: Dammastock
- Isolation: 6.9 km (4.3 mi)
- Listing: Canton high point, Alpine mountains above 3000 m
- Coordinates: 46°46′21″N 8°26′14″E

Naming
- Language of name: German

Geography
- Location within Switzerland
- Country: Switzerland
- Cantons: Obwalden and Bern
- Parent range: Uri Alps
- Topo map: Swiss Federal Office of Topography swisstopo

Geology
- Mountain type: Limestone

Climbing
- First ascent: 1739
- Easiest route: By cable car from Engelberg

Titlis is a mountain of the Uri Alps, located on the border between the cantons of Obwalden and Bern. At 3,238 metres (10,623 ft) above sea level, it is the highest summit of the range north of the Susten Pass, between the Bernese Oberland and Central Switzerland. It is mainly accessed from Engelberg (OW) on the north side and is famous as the site of the world's first rotating cable car. The cable car system connects Engelberg (996 m (3,268 ft)) to the summit of Klein Titlis (3,028 m (9,934 ft)) through the three stages of Gerschnialp (1,262 m (4,140 ft)), Trübsee (1,796 m (5,892 ft)) and Stand (2,428 m (7,966 ft)). In 2016, a direct route was created that bypassed Geraschnialp, going directly to Trübsee.

The last part of cable car leads above the glacier. At Klein Titlis, it is possible to visit an illuminated glacier cave from an entrance within the cable-car station, which also includes shops and restaurants. The Titlis Cliff Walk, the highest elevation suspension bridge in Europe, opened in December 2012, giving views across the Alps. Many people use Titlis as a cheaper and easier option than Jungfraujoch.

== Geography ==
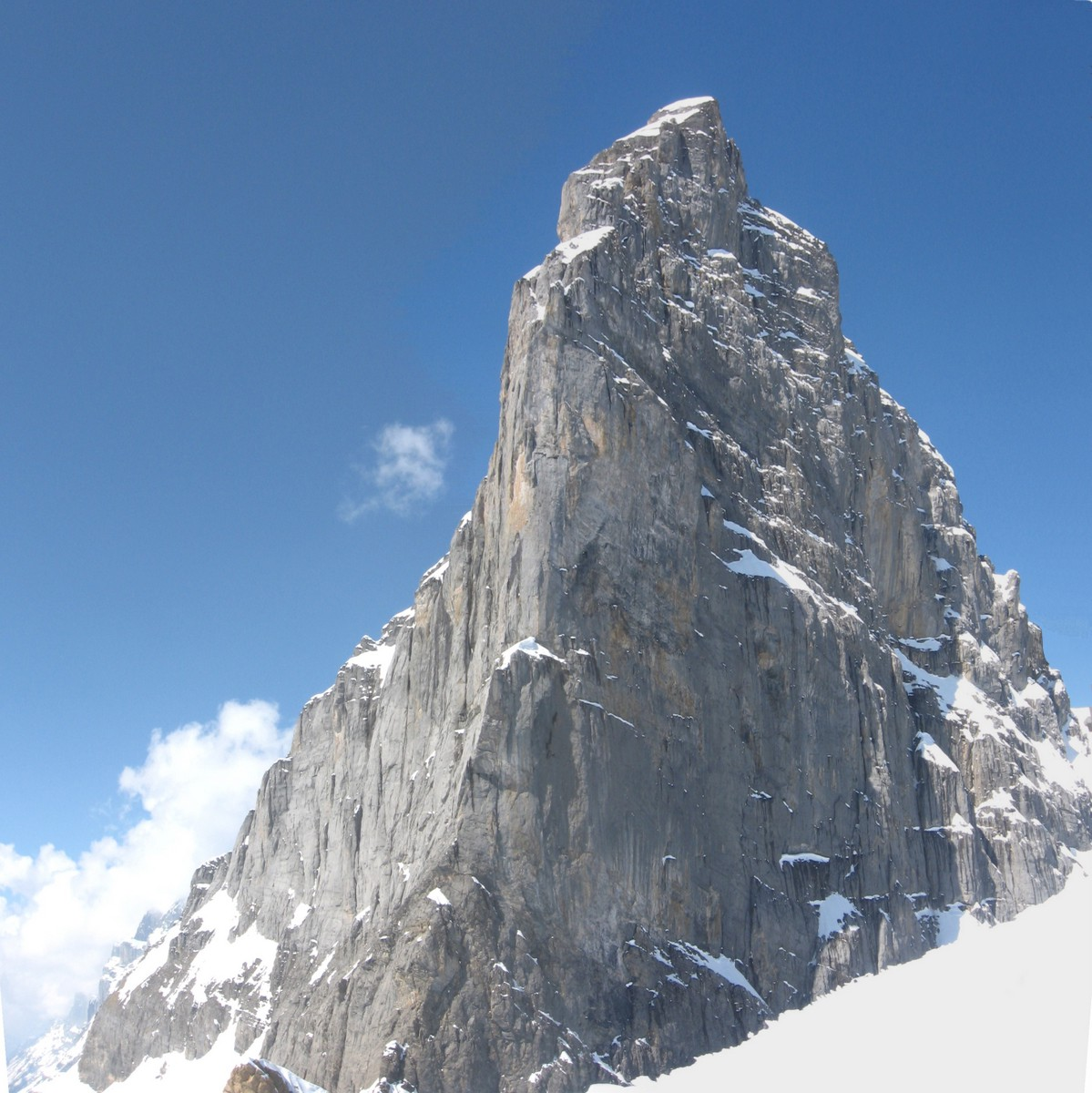
The south-east spur seen from the Grassen

Titlis straddles the border between Obwalden and Bern. The main summit of Titlis (sometimes distinguished by the name Gross Titlis) and Klein Titlis are both located between the municipalities of Engelberg on the north and Gadmen on the south. The Titlis massif is also partially located in Nidwalden, where the highest point of that canton is found: the Rotstöckli (2,901 m). Titlis itself is the highest point in Obwalden and in the valley of Engelberg. East of Titlis is the Grassen, where the borders between the cantons of Obwalden, Berne and Uri converge. The geographical center of Switzerland is situated about 15 kilometers west of the mountain.

Titlis is the highest mountain in the portion of the Uri Alps north of the Susten Pass. This part of the range is located between the valleys of the Hasli (west) and the Reuss (east), thus separating the waters feeding the basins of the Aare and Reuss respectively. On the north side, the valley of Engelberg (Engelbergertal) is drained by the Engelberger Aa, a tributary of the Lake Lucerne. The valley is located southwards from Lake Lucerne.

The northern side of the massif is covered by the Titlis Glacier (German: Titlisgletscher). Due to the global warming the glacier has been receded dramatically; it is expected to disappear in about twenty years. The south steep and rocky face rises above the Wenden Glacier. The east side overlooks a glacier named Firnalpeligletscher.

== History ==
In earlier times, Titlis was known under the names Wendenstock or Nollen. The Reissend Nollen and the Wendenstöcke are the nearest western neighbours to the mountain, slightly lower than Titlis, but with sharp rugged peaks. In a document of 1435 the mountain is called Tuttelsberg (Tutilos mountain), referencing to a man named Tutilos, who was probably a local farmer. The name, from Tutilos Berg, became Titlisberg and later Titlis.

The first ascent of Titlis was probably made in the year 1739. It was done by Ignaz Hess, J. E. Waser and two other men from Engelberg. The first written evidence of an ascent is found in the Engelberger Dokumente. They mention a party of four men that reached the summit in 1744.

On 21 January 1904 the first ski ascent of Titlis was made by Joseph Kuster and Willi Amrhein.

In March 1967 the cable car to Klein Titlis (3,032 m) was inaugurated.

In December 2012, the Titlis Cliff Walk opened to commemorate the 110th anniversary of the Engelberg-Gerschnialp cableway.

== Telecommunications and Observation tower ==
Klein Titlis hosts a significant telecommunications tower, used for high capacity point-to-point microwave radio links and VHF/UHF repeaters. Licensed band radio links are regulated by the Swiss Federal Office of Communications.

Im May 2026, the Titlis Observation tower was opened. At its top, just below the antennas, there is an observation deck from which visitors can look out in all directions. Further down, there is a restaurant. To accommodate all of this, the antenna tower’s original steel structure was expanded (new staircases, an elevator, and two horizontal beams).

== Weather ==
The summit of Titlis is located above the snow line, thus it has a cold, snowy climate with permanent snow cover and freezing temperatures.

== Gallery ==
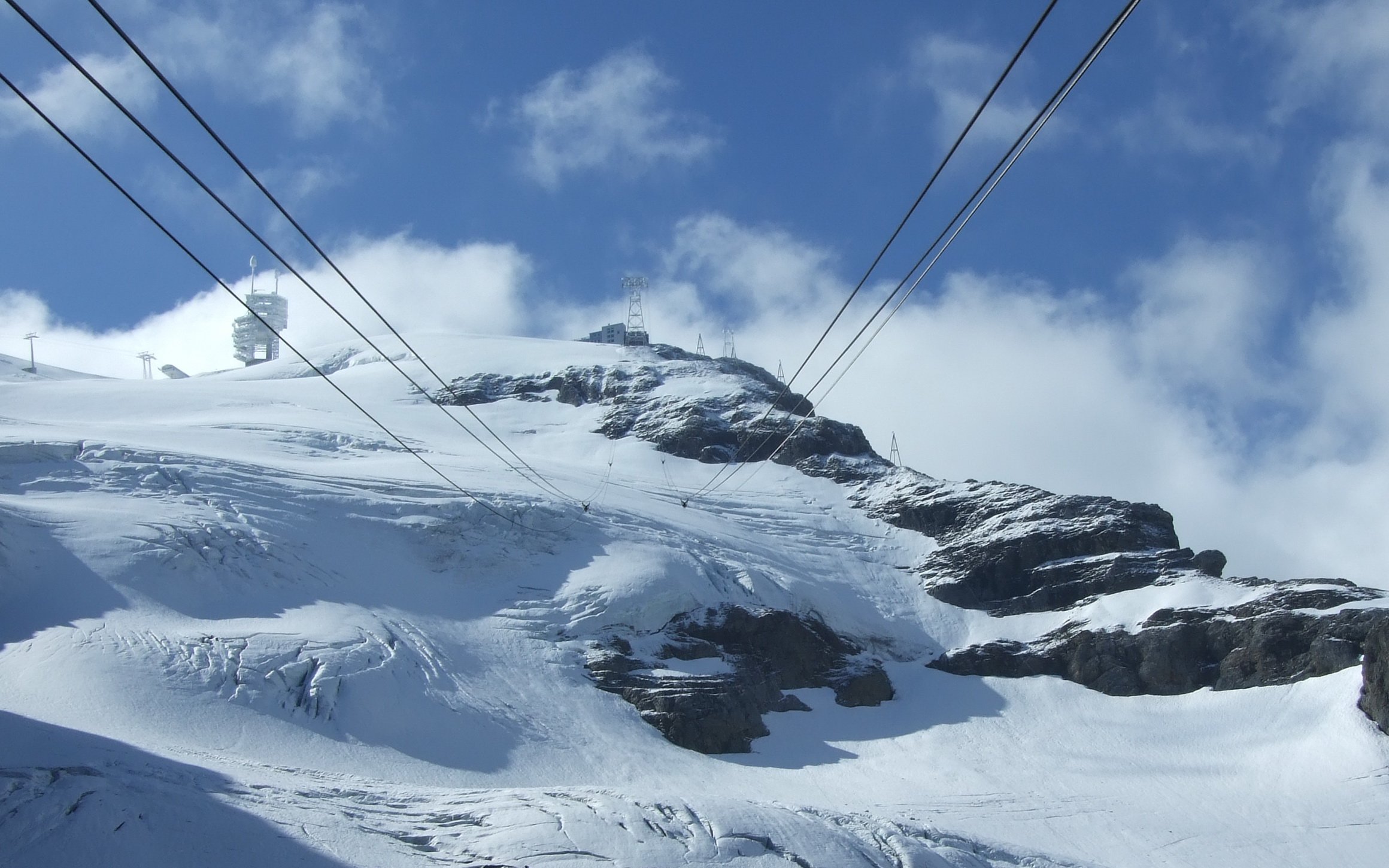
Stand-Klein Titlis cableway (July 2010)

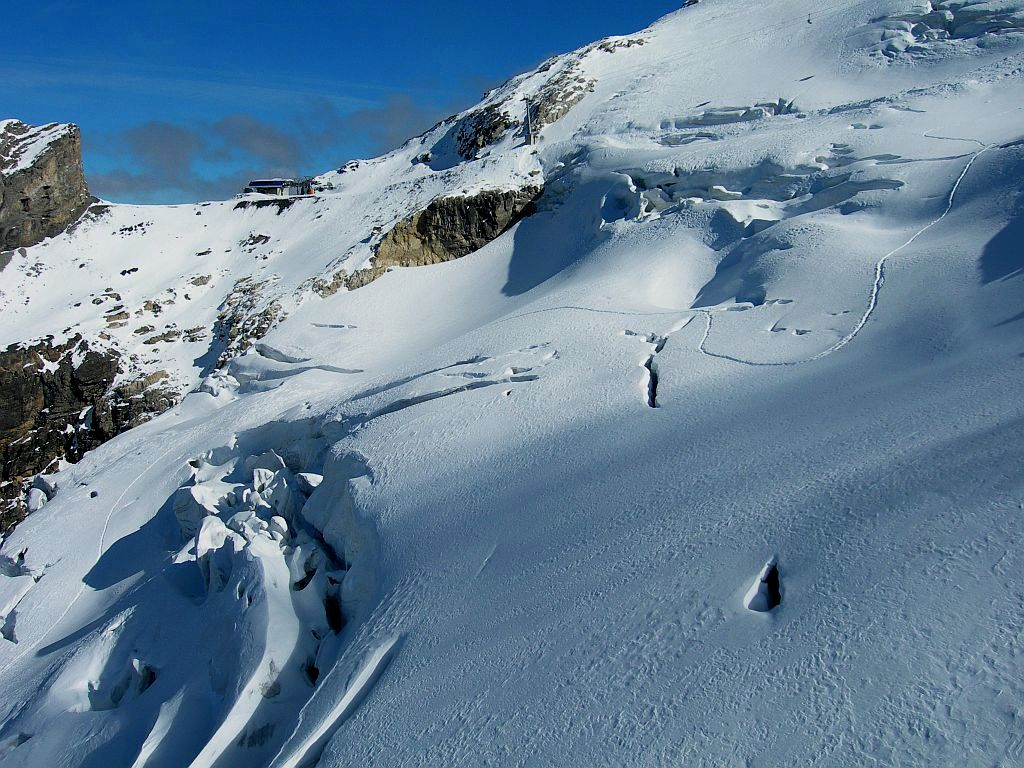
Titlis Glacier (October 2005)

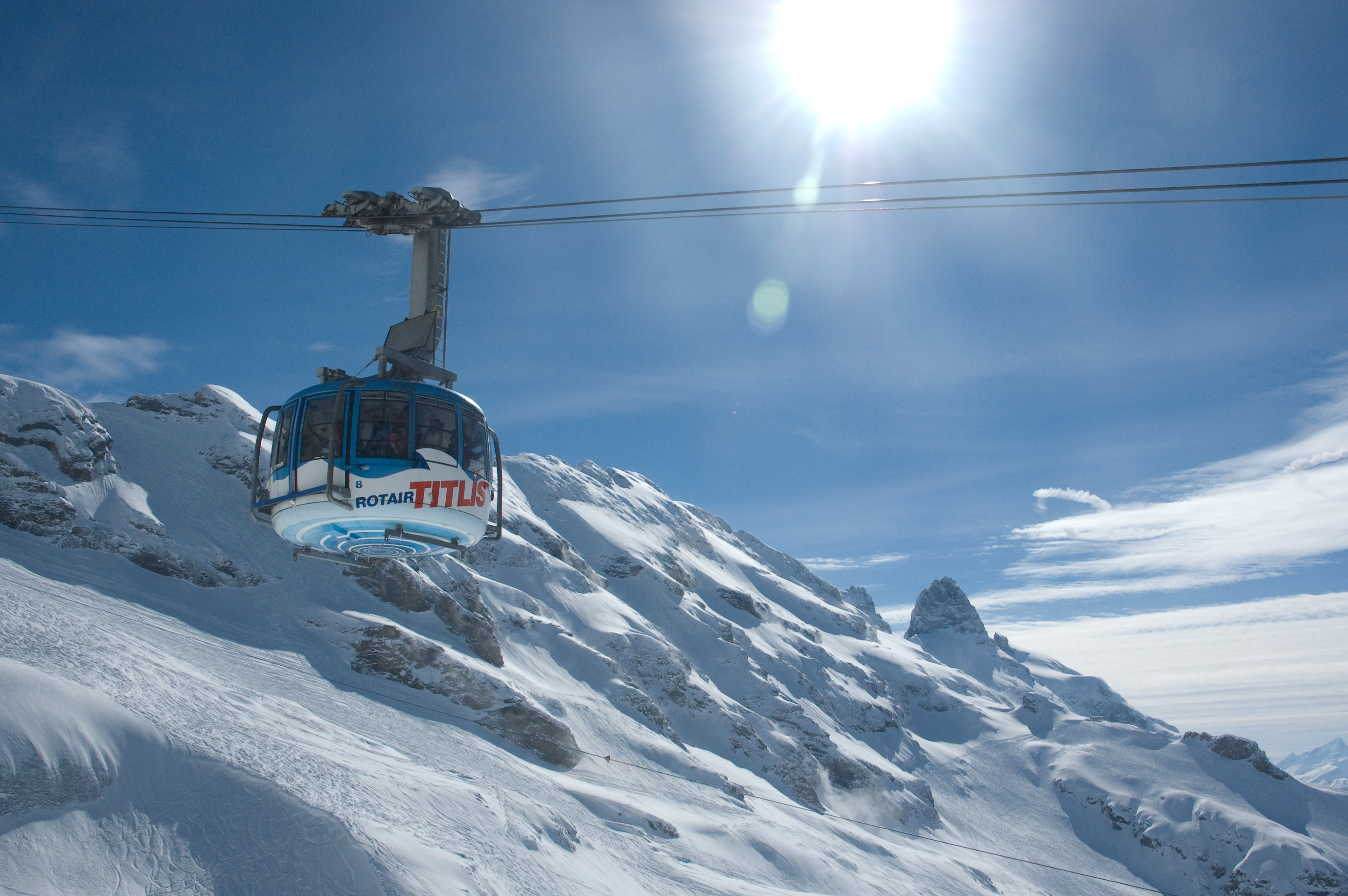
Stand-Klein Titlis cable car, old version (March 2008)

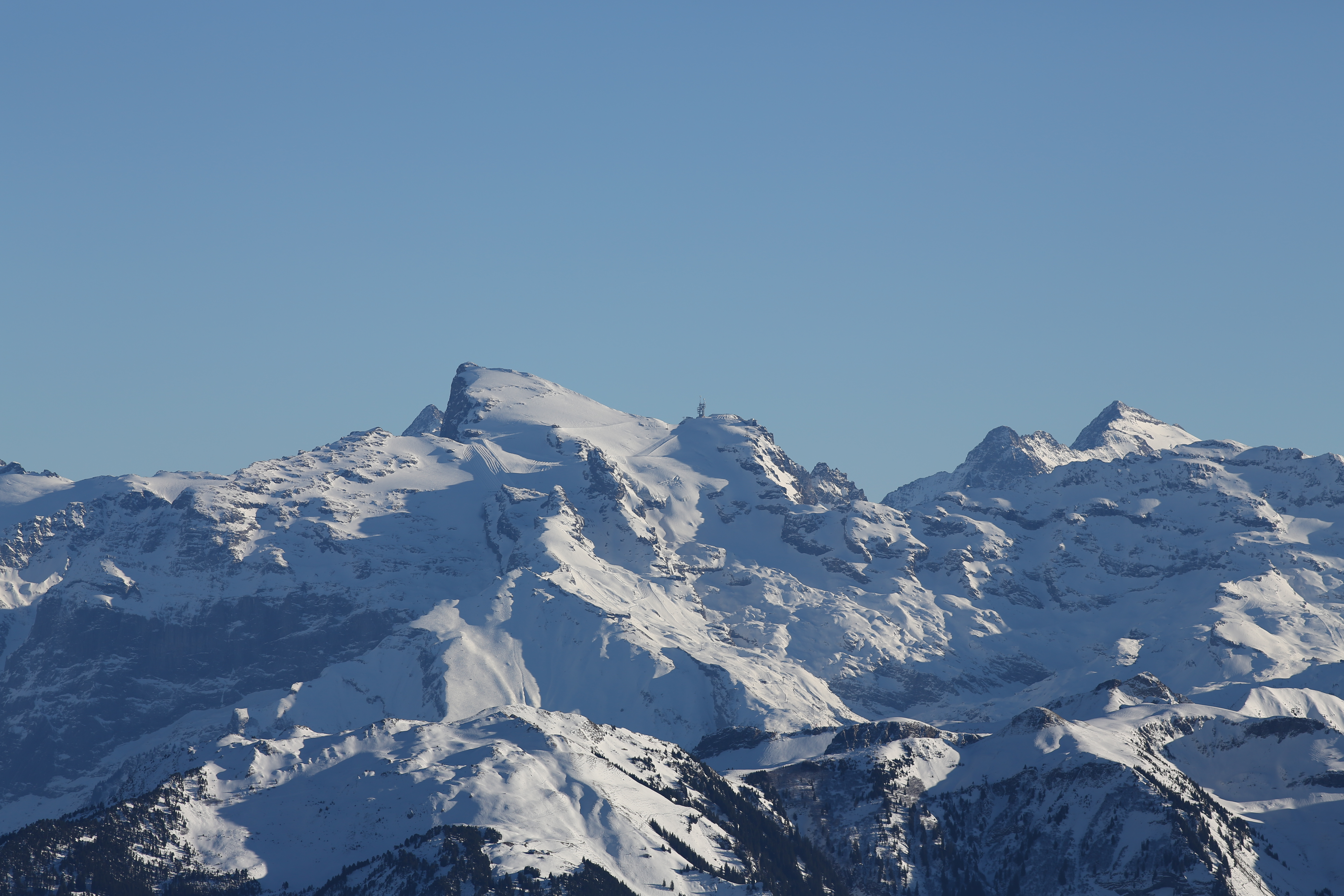
Titlis from Pilatus

== See also ==
- List of mountains of Switzerland
