= Reissend Nollen =

Mountain in Switzerland

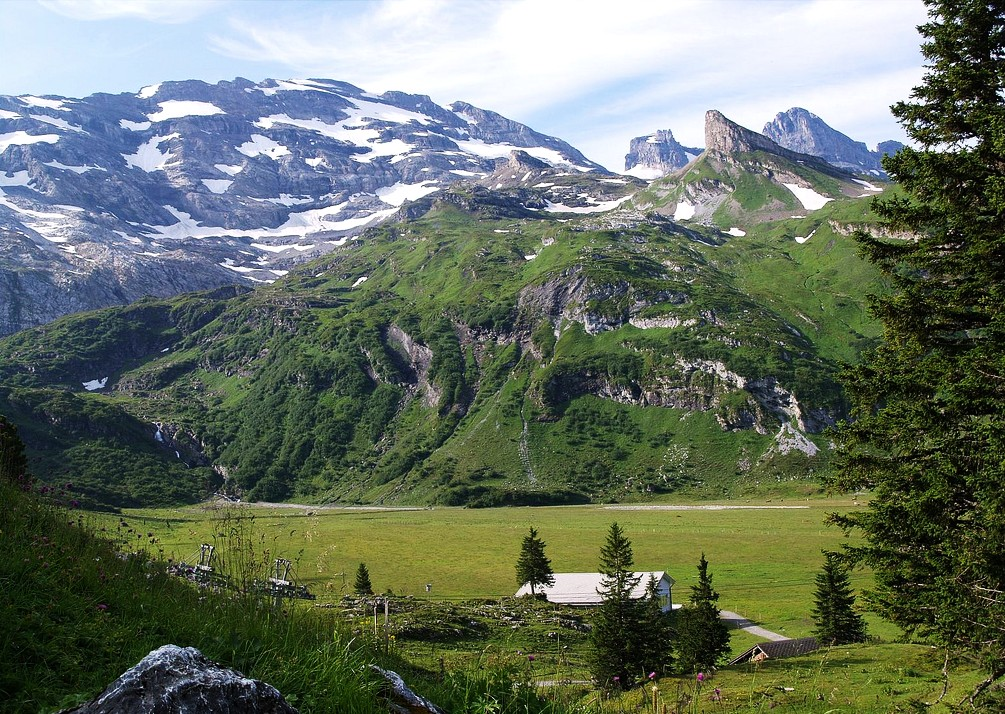
- The north side as seen from Trüebsee cable car station

Highest point
- Elevation: 3,003 m (9,852 ft)
- Prominence: 229 m (751 ft)
- Parent peak: Wendenstöcke
- Coordinates: 46°45′59.5″N 8°24′3″E

Naming
- Language of name: German

Geography
- Location within Switzerland
- Country: Switzerland
- Cantons: Bern and Obwalden
- Parent range: Urner Alps
- Topo map: Swiss Federal Office of Topography swisstopo

The Reissend Nollen is a mountain peak of the Urner Alps, located on the border between the Swiss cantons of Obwalden and Bern. It lies on the range west of the Titlis, between Engelberg and Gadmen.
