= Trübsee =

Lake in Wolfenschiessen, Central Switzerland, Switzerland

Trüebsee
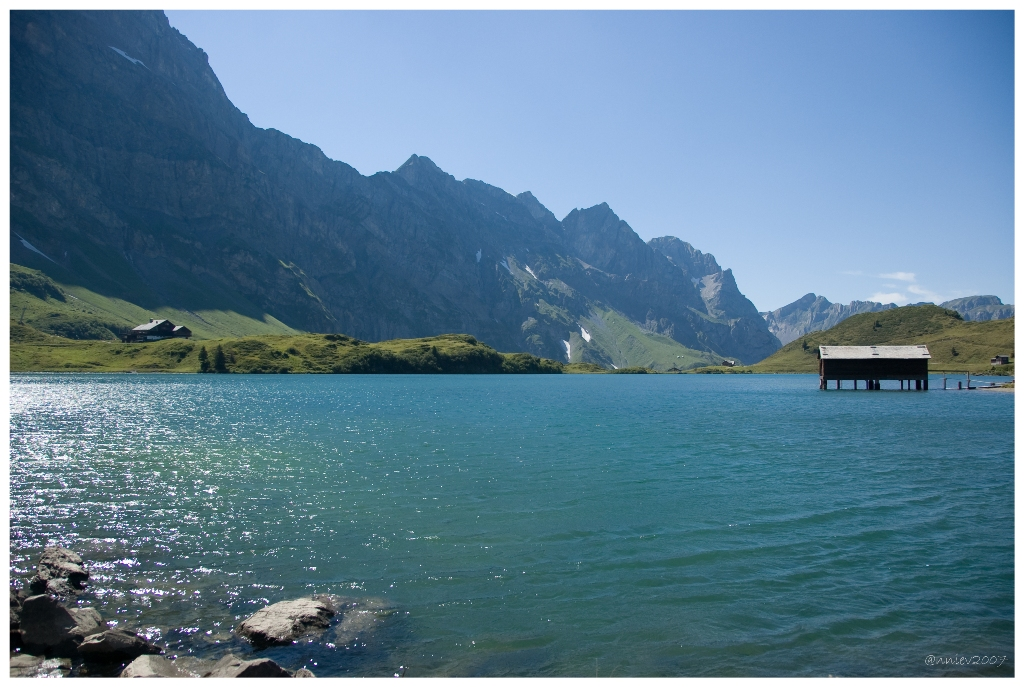

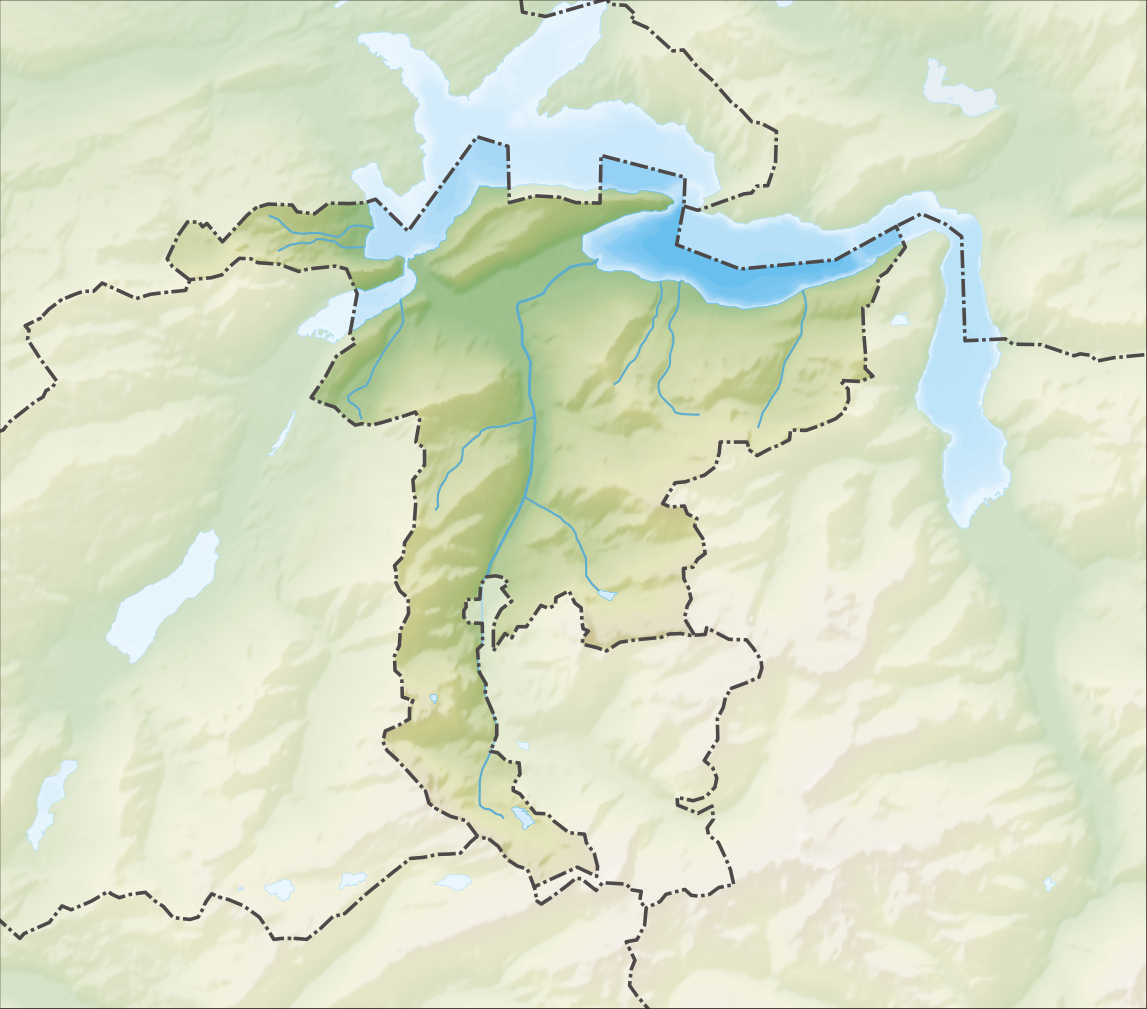
- Location within Canton of Nidwalden Location within Switzerland Location within Alps
- Interactive map of Trüebsee
- Location: Ober Trüebsee, municipality of Wolfenschiessen, Nidwalden (above Engelberg, OW)
- Coordinates: 46°47′38″N 8°23′27″E
- Type: Alpine
- Primary inflows: Trüebseebach
- Primary outflows: Trüebenbach
- Basin countries: Switzerland
- Max. depth: 10 m (33 ft)
- Surface elevation: 1,764 m (5,787 ft)

Trübsee (1,788 m (5,866 ft)) is an intermediate cable car station by the Titlis Bergbahnen, Trüebsee (lit.: turbid lake, Germanized: Trübsee) is an Alpine lake (1,764 m (5,787 ft)) on the Ober Trüebsee Alpine pasture (or often just incorrectly shortened to Trüebsee) in the upper part of the extensive municipality of Wolfenschiessen in the Swiss canton of Nidwalden. The lake lies at the foot of the Titlis above the village resort of Engelberg. It can be reached from the village by cable car, or via several alpine walking paths, e.g. the Pfaffenwand. The first aerial cableway was built in 1927 from Gerschnialp, that could be reached with Gerschnialpbahn.

The lake is a hydroelectric reservoir, providing water to the underground power station Trübsee (opened in 1968) near Engelberg, before flowing into the lake Eugenisee.

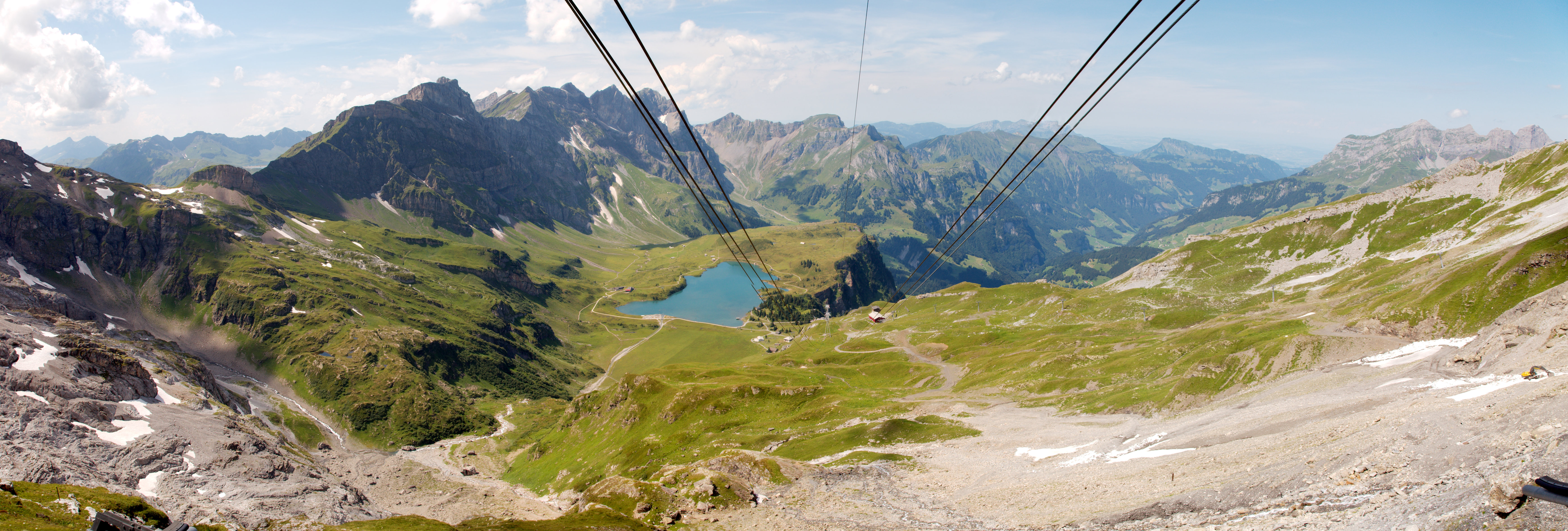
View of the lake, called Trüebsee, seen from the cable car between Trübsee and Stand

== See also ==
- List of mountain lakes of Switzerland
