= Wendenstöcke =

Mountain of the Uri Alps

- Gross Wendenstock
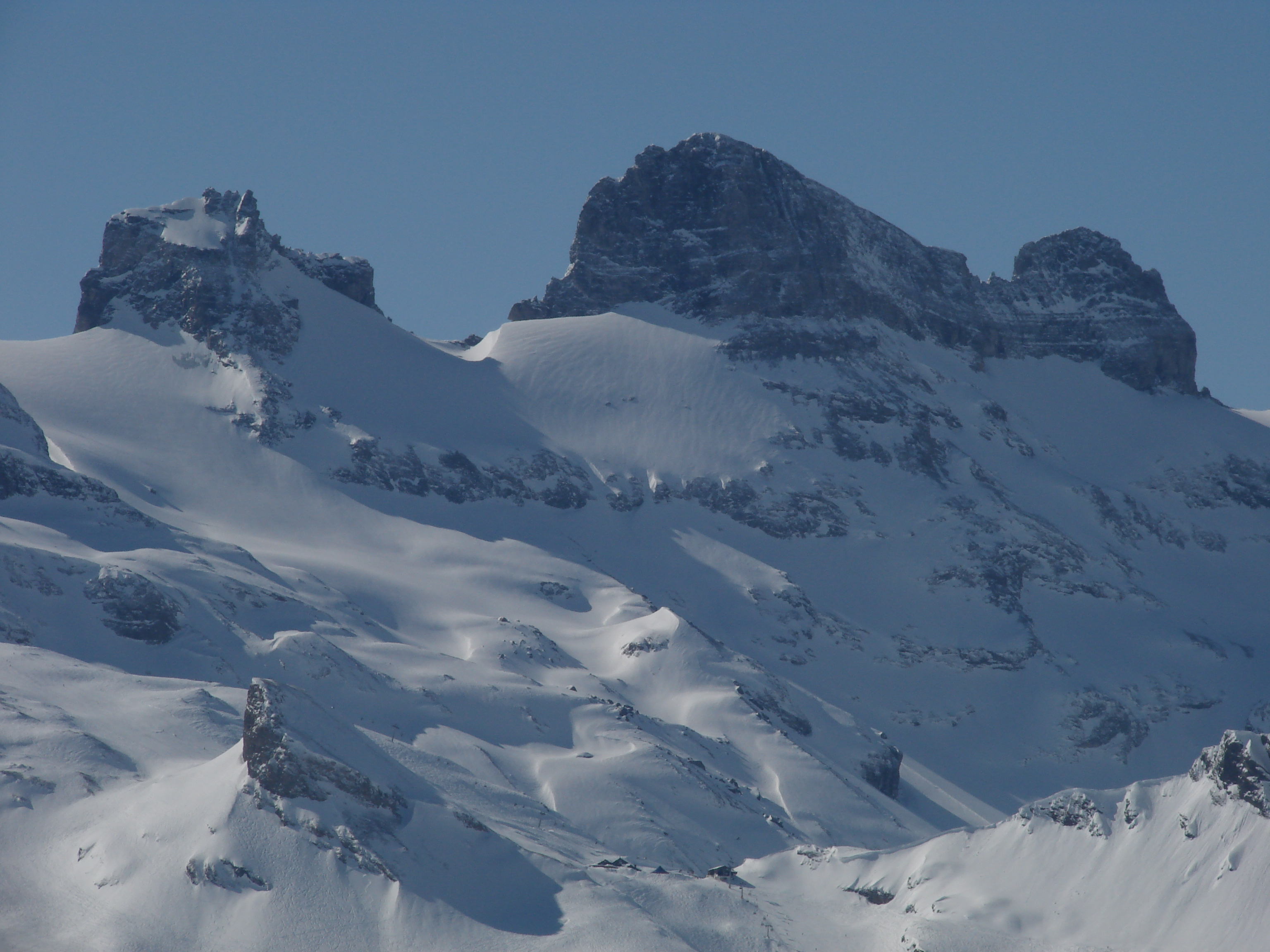

Highest point
- Elevation: 3,042 m (9,980 ft)
- Prominence: 346 m (1,135 ft)
- Parent peak: Titlis
- Listing: Alpine mountains above 3000 m
- Coordinates: 46°45′42″N 08°22′49.7″E

Geography
- Location within Switzerland
- Location: Bern, Switzerland
- Parent range: Uri Alps

The Wendenstöcke are a multi-summited mountain of the Uri Alps, overlooking Gadmen in the canton of Bern. The main summit (3,042 m) is named Gross Wendenstock.
