= Titlis Cliff Walk =

Pedestrian bridge along Mount Titlis in Switzerland

Coordinates: 46°46′13″N 8°25′35″E

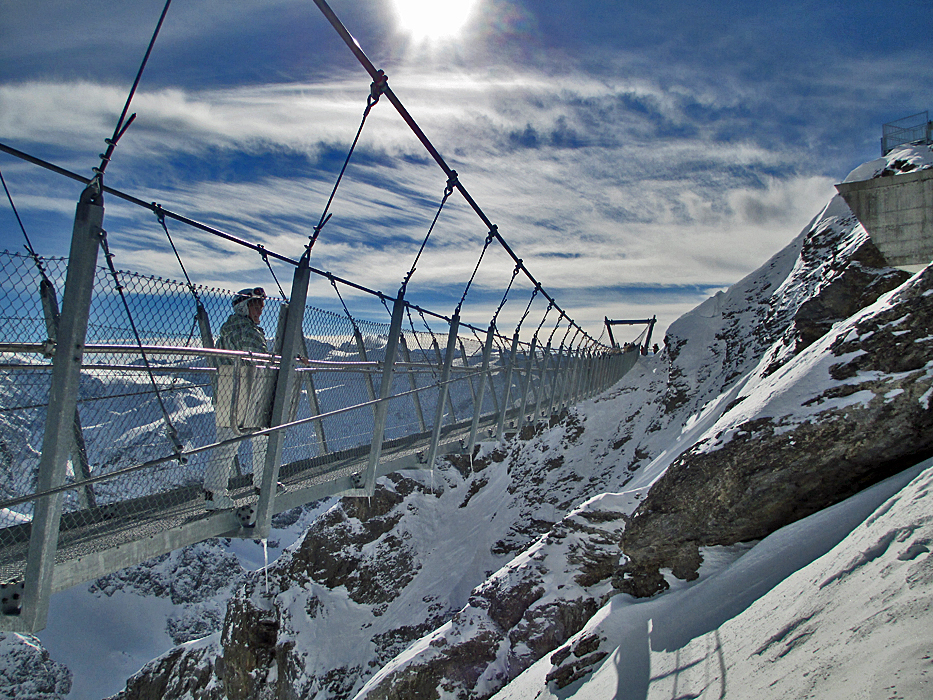
The Titlis Cliff Walk

The Titlis Cliff Walk is a pedestrian bridge along the cliff of Mount Titlis in the Swiss Alps. Built at around 3,000 m (9,800 ft) above sea level, it is believed to be the highest-elevation suspension bridge in Europe. It broke the record held by Salbit Bridge, also located in Switzerland. The bridge spans a distance of around 100 m (320 ft) but is just 1 m (3 ft) wide.

The project was designed as a celebration of the 100th anniversary of the opening of the Engelberg–Gerschnialp funicular railway in January 1913. It was officially opened on 7 December 2012 during a snow storm, leaving dignitaries from 15 countries unable to see more than just a few metres; the public opening occurred a day later.

Constructed over a period of five months, the bridge was built when weather conditions permitted. It was designed to withstand winds that reach over 190 km/h (120 mph) as well as significant snowfall, with a spokesman for Titlis Engelberg ski resort explaining that it can cope with around 450 tonnes (500 short tons) of snow. Much of the material used in construction was transported on cable cars, with larger sections being delivered by helicopter.

At a cost of around £1 million, it is hoped that the bridge will become a significant tourist attraction, particularly during the warmer months. In the first two weeks of it being opened, around 500 visitors crossed the bridge. Media reports called it the "world's scariest bridge" and Switzerland Tourism called it "a high-adrenaline kind of new adventure".

== Tourism and access ==
The Titlis Cliff Walk is approximately 100 metres long and one metre wide, stretching from one rock face to another near the Südwandfenster viewing platform at 3,041 metres above sea level. A 500-metre deep chasm opens beneath the bridge, offering views of the surrounding mountain landscape. Crossing the span involves taking about 150 steps. Visitors reach the bridge from the Titlis summit station by passing through an ice grotto and a viewing platform. At the far end, the bridge connects directly to the Ice Flyer chairlift, which passes over glacier crevasses up to ten metres deep. A spokesman for the Titlis Engelberg resort claims that the bridge is "100 percent safe" and said it is "really impossible to fall from the bridge".

== See also ==
- List of bridges in Switzerland
- Peak Walk
- Tourism in Switzerland
