= Wassen =

- Municipality
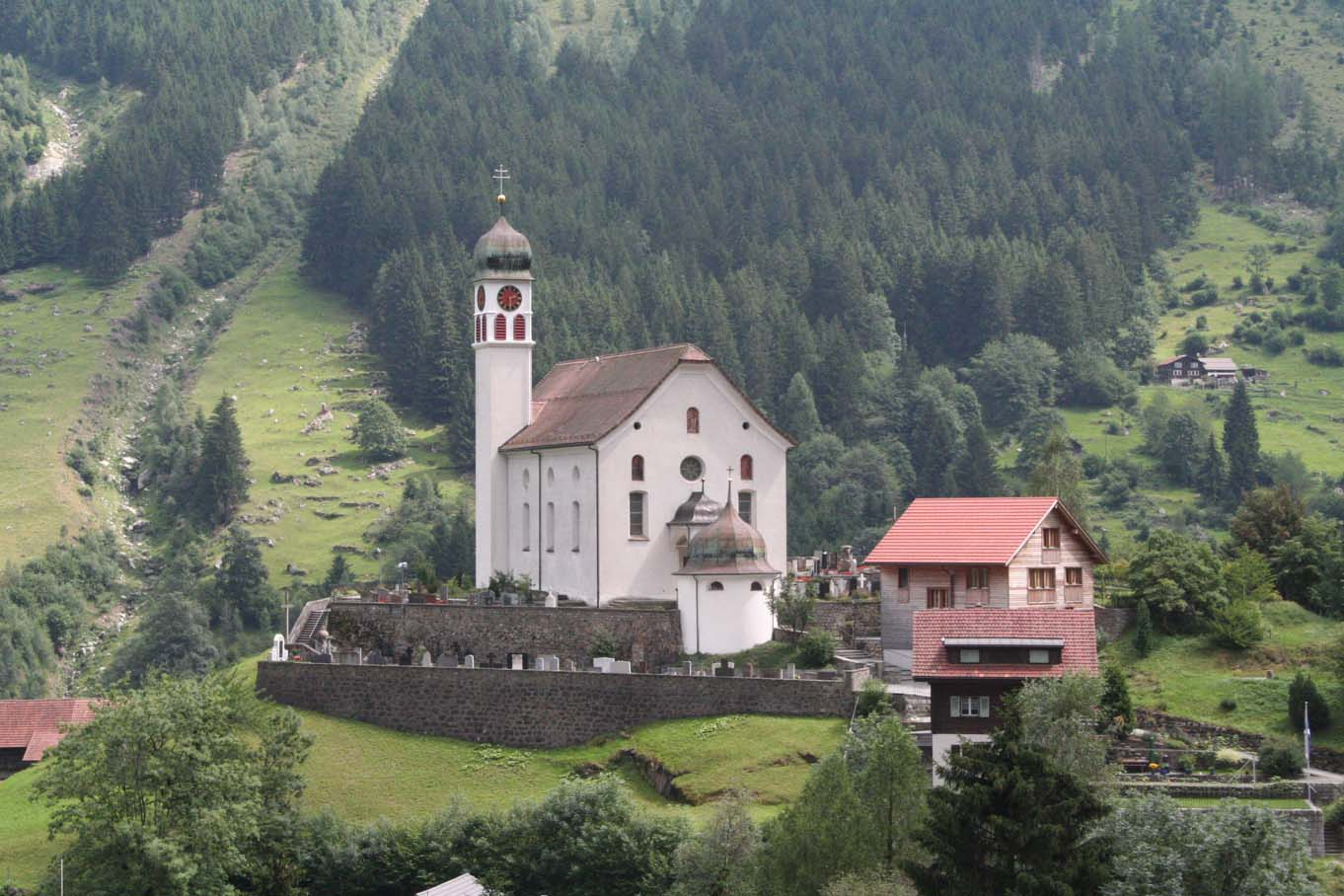
- Pfarrkirche St. Gallus

- Coat of arms
- Location of Wassen
- Location within Switzerland Location within Canton of Uri
- Coordinates: 46°42′N 8°35′E
- Country: Switzerland
- Canton: Uri
- District: n.a.

Area
  - Total: 97.02 km^{2} (37.46 sq mi)
- Elevation: 930 m (3,050 ft)

Population (December 2020)
  - Total: 412
  - Density: 4.25/km^{2} (11.0/sq mi)
- Time zone: UTC+01:00 (CET)
  - Summer (DST): UTC+02:00 (CEST)
- Postal code: 6484
- SFOS number: 1220
- ISO 3166 code: CH-UR
- Surrounded by: Attinghausen, Engelberg (OW), Erstfeld, Gadmen (BE), Göschenen, Gurtnellen
- Website: www.wassen.ch

Wassen is a village and municipality in the canton of Uri in Switzerland.

== Geography ==
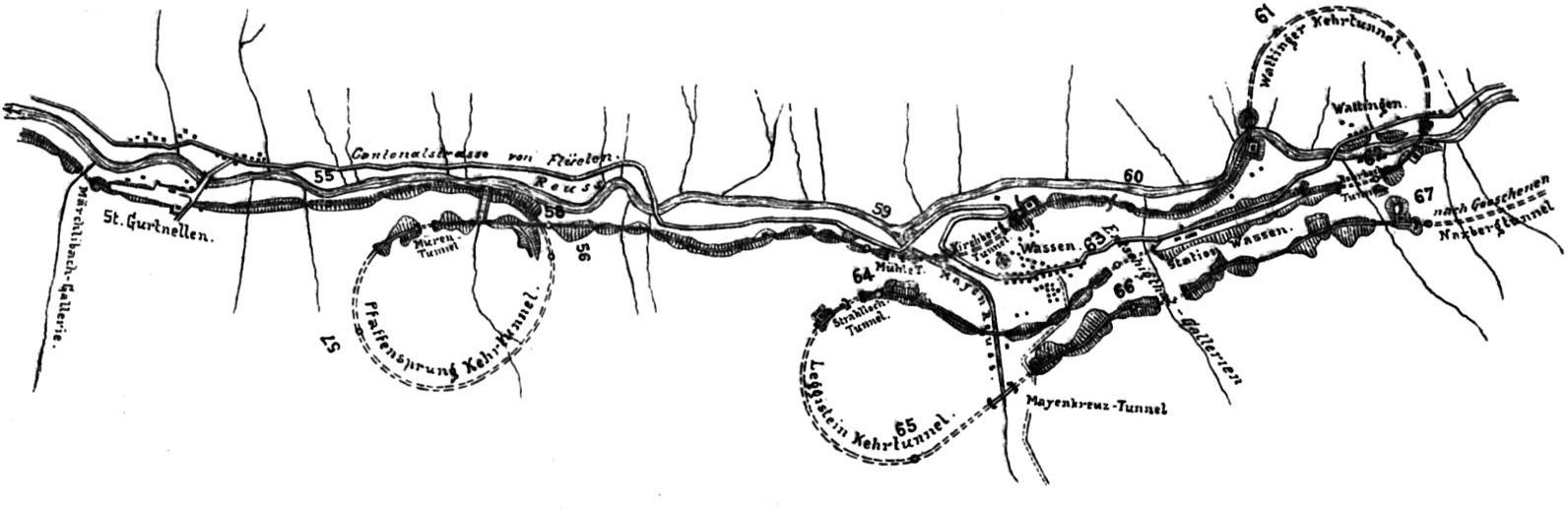
Double loop curved tunnel on the Gotthardbahn rail line near Wassen

Aerial view (1963)

As of 2006, Wassen has an area of 97 km^{2} (37 sq mi). Of this area, 12.5% is used for agricultural purposes, while 18.2% is forested. Of the rest of the land, 1.1% is settled (buildings or roads) and the remainder (68.1%) is non-productive (rivers, glaciers or mountains). In the 1993/97 land survey, 9.6% of the total land area was heavily forested, while 6.8% is covered in small trees and shrubbery. Of the agricultural land, 2.5% is used for orchards or vine crops and 10.1% is used for alpine pastures. Of the settled areas, 0.2% is covered with buildings, and 0.8% is transportation infrastructure. Of the unproductive areas, 0.1% is unproductive standing water (ponds or lakes), 1.2% is unproductive flowing water (rivers), 48.5% is too rocky for vegetation, and 18.3% is other unproductive land.

It is on the Gotthard line and the rail line makes a double loop near Wassen to help the trains deal with the climb. The Susten Pass connects Wassen with Innertkirchen.

== Sights ==
The Gottardo-Weitwanderweg (long-distance hiking trail) between Erstfeld and Biasca was opened for the 125th anniversary of the Gotthard Railway. Panels at over 50 places, including Wassen, provide information on the Gotthard Region and its railway. Waterworld educational and experience trail is a 60 km (37 mi) long network of trails in nearby Göscheneralptal with 90 stations devoted to the theme of water. The Schöllenen Gorge is a gorge, over which, according to legend, a bridge could only be built with the help of the devil. The Pfaffensprung crystal caves is a 165 m (541 ft) long crystal cave. It is the second largest crystal cave in Switzerland and has provided large quantities of mountain crystals for centuries. Accessible with a guide.

== Demographics ==
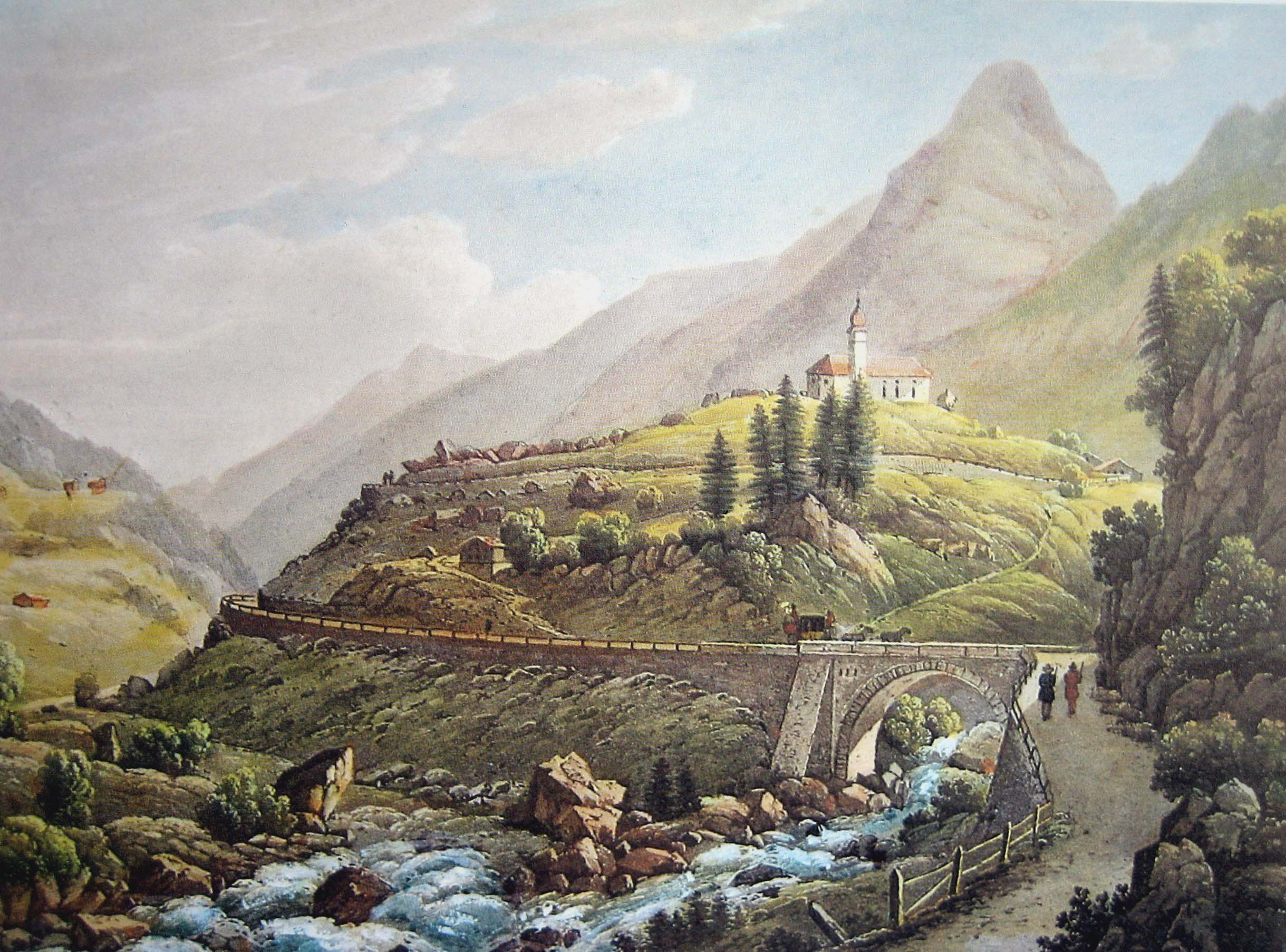
Wassen in 1845

Wassen has a population (as of 31 December 2020) of 412. As of 2007, 7.2% of the population was made up of foreign nationals. Over the last 10 years the population has decreased at a rate of -16%. Most of the population (as of 2000) speaks German (94.2%), with Serbo-Croatian being second most common (2.4%) and Italian being third (1.3%). As of 2007 the gender distribution of the population was 51.8% male and 48.2% female.

In the 2007 federal election the FDP party received 85.9% of the vote.

In Wassen about 53% of the population (between age 25–64) have completed either non-mandatory upper secondary education or additional higher education (either university or a Fachhochschule).

Wassen has an unemployment rate of 0.64%. As of 2005, there were 43 people employed in the primary economic sector and about 18 businesses involved in this sector. 34 people are employed in the secondary sector and there are 7 businesses in this sector. 121 people are employed in the tertiary sector, with 18 businesses in this sector.

The historical population is given in the following table:

year	population
1970	764
1980	671
1990	545
2000	465
2005	466
2007	456
