= Gerschnialpbahn =

Funicular railway in Switzerland

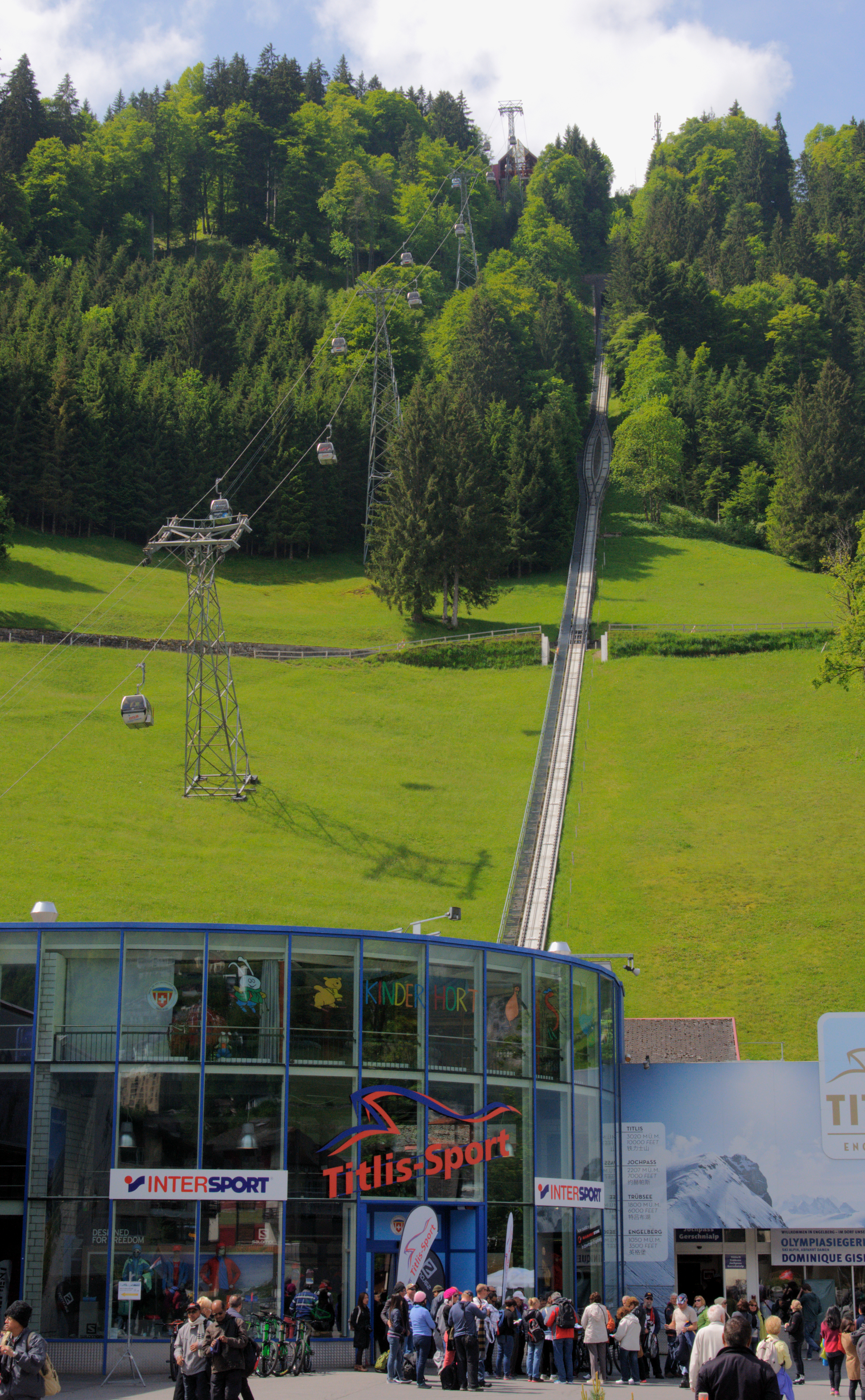
- View from lower station (2015)

Overview
- Other name(s): Standseilbahn Engelberg-Gerschnialp; Drahtseilbahn Engelberg-Gerschnialp
- Status: In operation
- Owner: Bergbahnen Engelberg-Trübsee-Titlis AG (since 1992); Drahtseilbahn Engelberg-Gerschnialp AG (1913-1981), Bergbahnen Engelberg-Gerschnialp-Trübsee AG (1982-1992)
- Locale: Engelberg, Switzerland
- Coordinates: 46.8145°N 8.3941°E
- Termini: Engelberg (Talstation Titlis) at Gerschnistrasse 12 46.816041°N 8.395561°E; Gerschnialp 46.812661°N 8.392371°E
- Stations: 2

Service
- Type: Funicular
- Route number: 2533
- Operator(s): Bergbahnen Engelberg-Trübsee-Titlis AG (short: Titlis Bergbahnen)
- Rolling stock: 2 for 75 persons each (new in 1950)

History
- Opened: 21 January 1913

Technical
- Line length: 512 m (1,680 ft)
- Track length: 528 m (1,732 ft)
- Number of tracks: 1 (with passing loop)
- Track gauge: 1,000 mm (3 ft 3 3/8 in)
- Electrification: change from AC to DC in 1964
- Conduction system: controls automated in 1964
- Operating speed: 3.2 metres per second (10 ft/s)
- Highest elevation: 1,262 m (4,140 ft)
- Maximum incline: 68%

Gerschnialpbahn is a funicular railway in Obwalden, Switzerland. The line leads from Engelberg at 1000 m to Gerschnialp at 1262 m on the slopes of Titlis (3239 m). The funicular with two cars has a single track with a passing loop and a tunnel (88 m) at upper end. Journey time is 5 minutes. It operates all year.

Different ways lead from Gerschnialp to Trübsee at 1800 m, the intermediary station to the summit station of Titlis (3028 m). In 1927, an aerial cableway had been built, earlier a hiking path used. Since 1984, the lower station of the funicular is next to the direct aerial cableway Engelberg-Trübsee and, until 2015, the lower section ran parallel to the funicular. At Untertrübsee, near Gerschnialp, there is the aerial cableway Älplerseil Untertrübsee-Trübsee.

A bus line links the base station to Engelberg railway station, 800 m away.

== History ==
On request of the municipal council of Engelberg, the Swiss Federal Assembly granted a concession for the funicular on 8 March 1912. Initial duration was 80 years.

The funicular opened on 21 January 1913. It was constructed by Bell Maschinenfabrik, Kriens.

In 1950, new cars increased the capacity from 40 to 70 passengers per car. The cars are still in use.

In 1964, AC drive was replaced with a DC system leading to a performance increase from 140 to 250 hp. Also automatic controls were installed.

A new base station was inaugurated in 1978.

In 1995, drive and controls were renewed.

Titlis Cliff Walk was inaugurated in December 2012 to commemorate its 100th anniversary.

During the reconstruction of the aerial cableway in 2015/2016, the funicular was again the only transport in direction of Trübsee.

== Drahtseilbahn Engelberg-Gerschnialp AG ==
The company Drahtseilbahn Engelberg-Gerschnialp AG was founded in 1911 to build and operate the funicular.

From 1913 to 1960, the company generated a cashflow of 1.15 million Swiss francs.

In 1982, the company merged with Luftseilbahn Gerschnialp-Trübsee AG and became Bergbahnen Engelberg-Gerschnialp-Trübsee AG. In 1992, another merger led to the current Bergbahnen Engelberg-Trübsee-Titlis.
