= Steinsee =

Lake in Bern, Switzerland

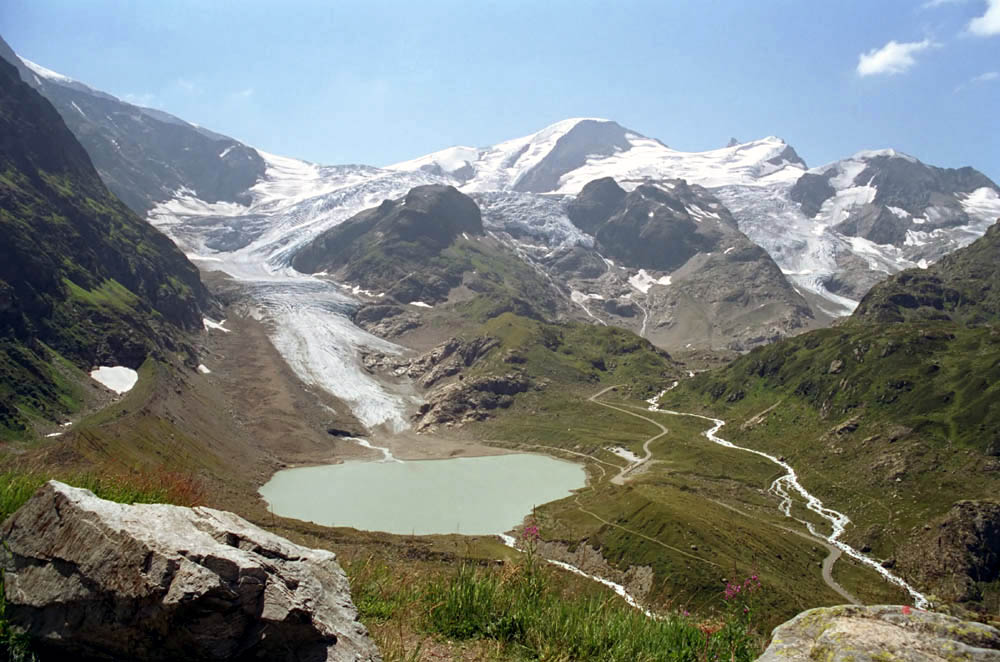

- Location within Canton of Bern Location within Switzerland Location within Alps
- Interactive map of Steinsee
- Location: Susten Pass, canton of Bern
- Coordinates: 46°43′30″N 8°26′0″E
- Basin countries: Switzerland
- Surface area: 11.64 ha (28.8 acres)
- Max. depth: 19 m (62 ft)
- Surface elevation: 1,934 m (6,345 ft)

Steinsee is a lake at Stein Glacier near Susten Pass in the canton of Bern, Switzerland.

== See also ==
- List of mountain lakes of Switzerland
