= Wichelplanggstock =

Mountain in Switzerland

- Location within Switzerland

Highest point
- Elevation: 2,974 m (9,757 ft)
- Prominence: 241 m (791 ft)
- Parent peak: Wendenhorn
- Coordinates: 46°45′56″N 8°28′22″E

Geography
- Location: Uri, Switzerland
- Parent range: Urner Alps

The Wichelplanggstock is a mountain of the Urner Alps, located near the Susten Pass in the canton of Uri. It lies just south of the Grassengrat, where the border with the canton of Obwalden runs.
