= Wenden Glacier =

Swiss glacier

- Wendengletscher
- Location within Switzerland
- Interactive map of Wenden Glacier
- Location: Canton of Bern, Switzerland
- Coordinates: 46.763993°N 8.435454°E

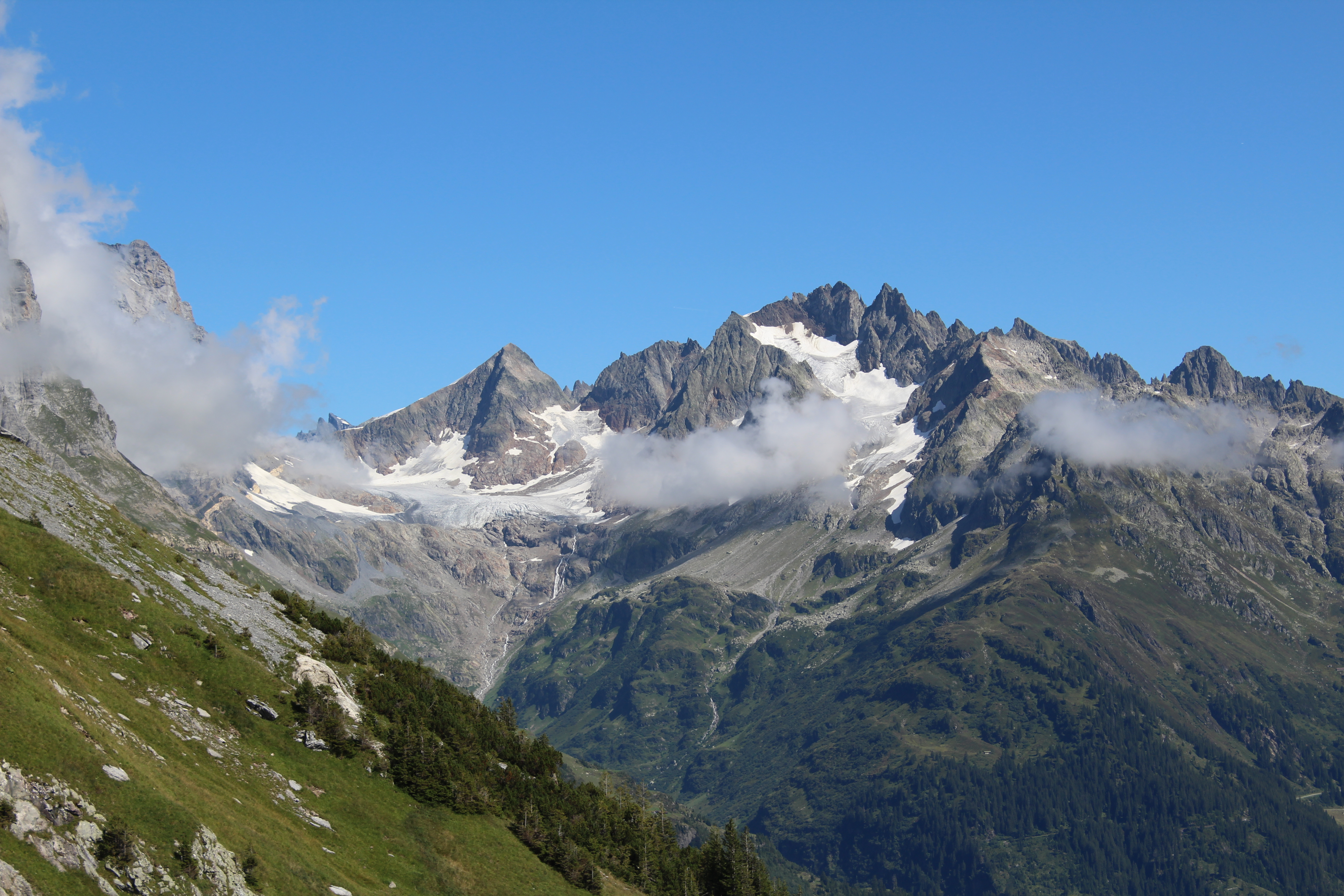

The Wenden Glacier (German: Wendengletscher) is a glacier in the Uri Alps in the canton of Bern in Switzerland.

== See also ==
- Trift Glacier
- Stein Glacier
- List of glaciers in Switzerland
- Swiss Alps
