= Stein Glacier =

Glacier in Switzerland

- Steingletscher
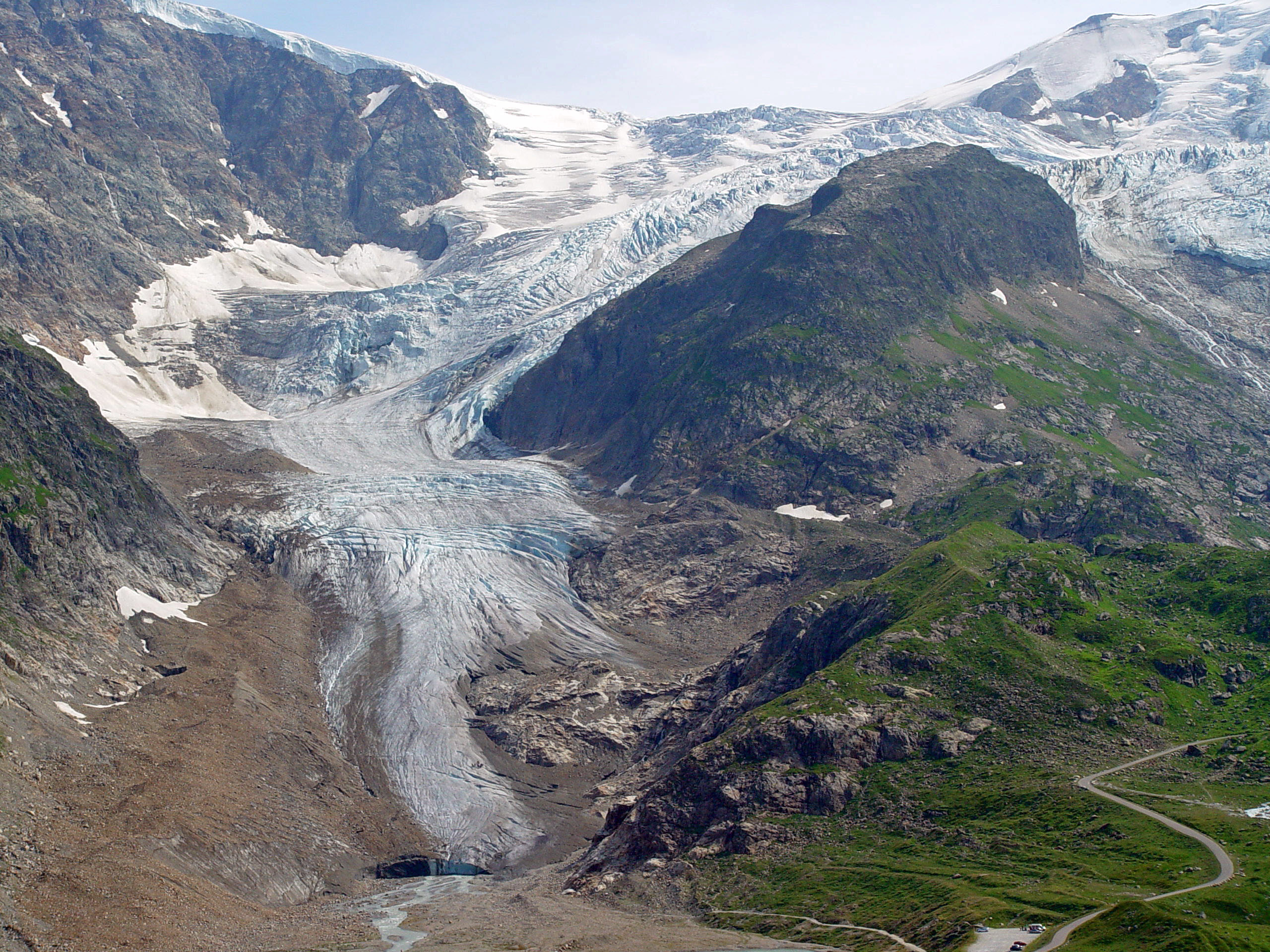
- Stein Glacier in summer 2006
- Interactive map of Stein Glacier
- Location: Canton of Bern, Switzerland
- Coordinates: 46°42′26″N 8°26′18″E
- Length: 4 km

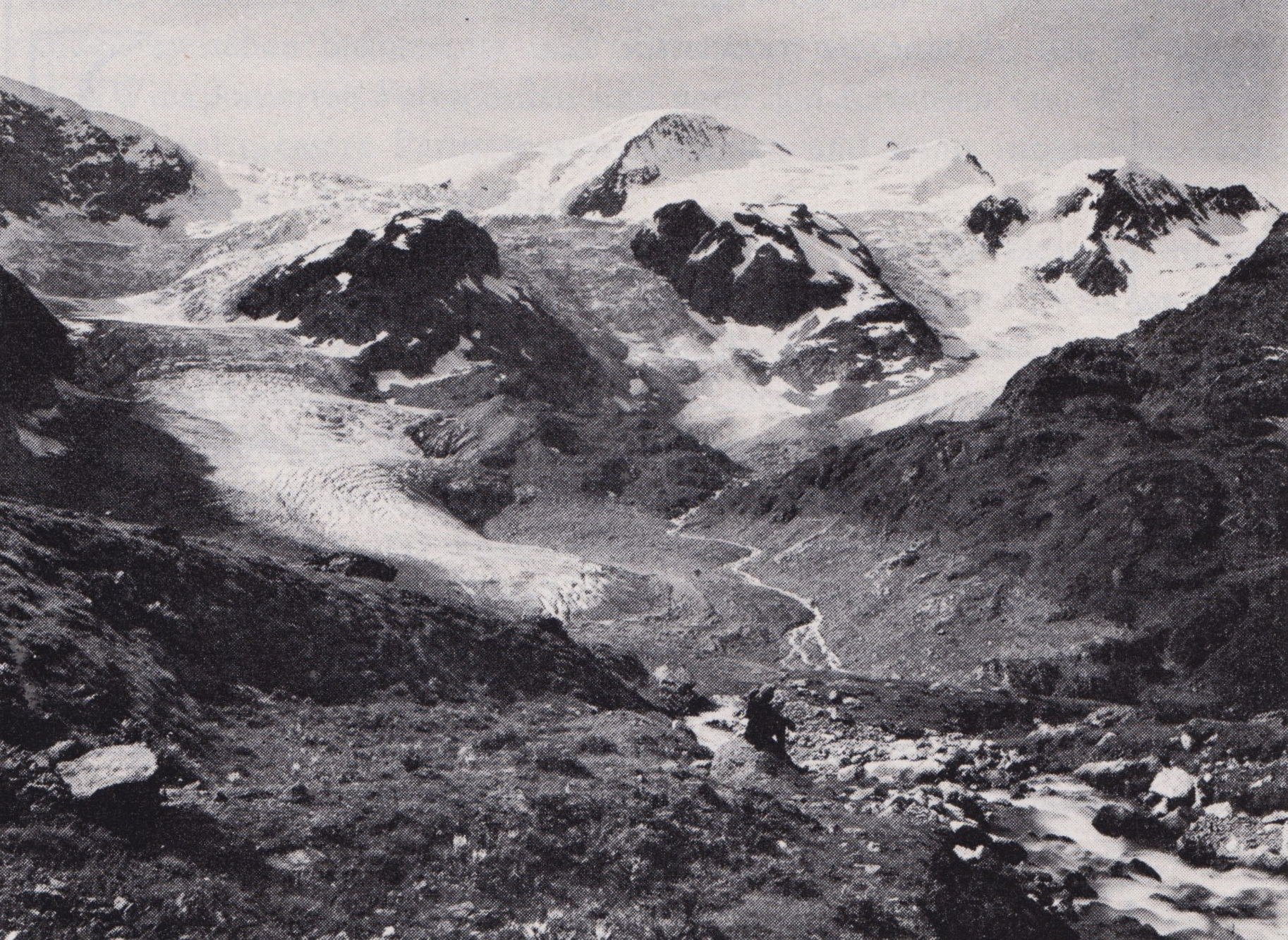
Stein Glacier in 1920

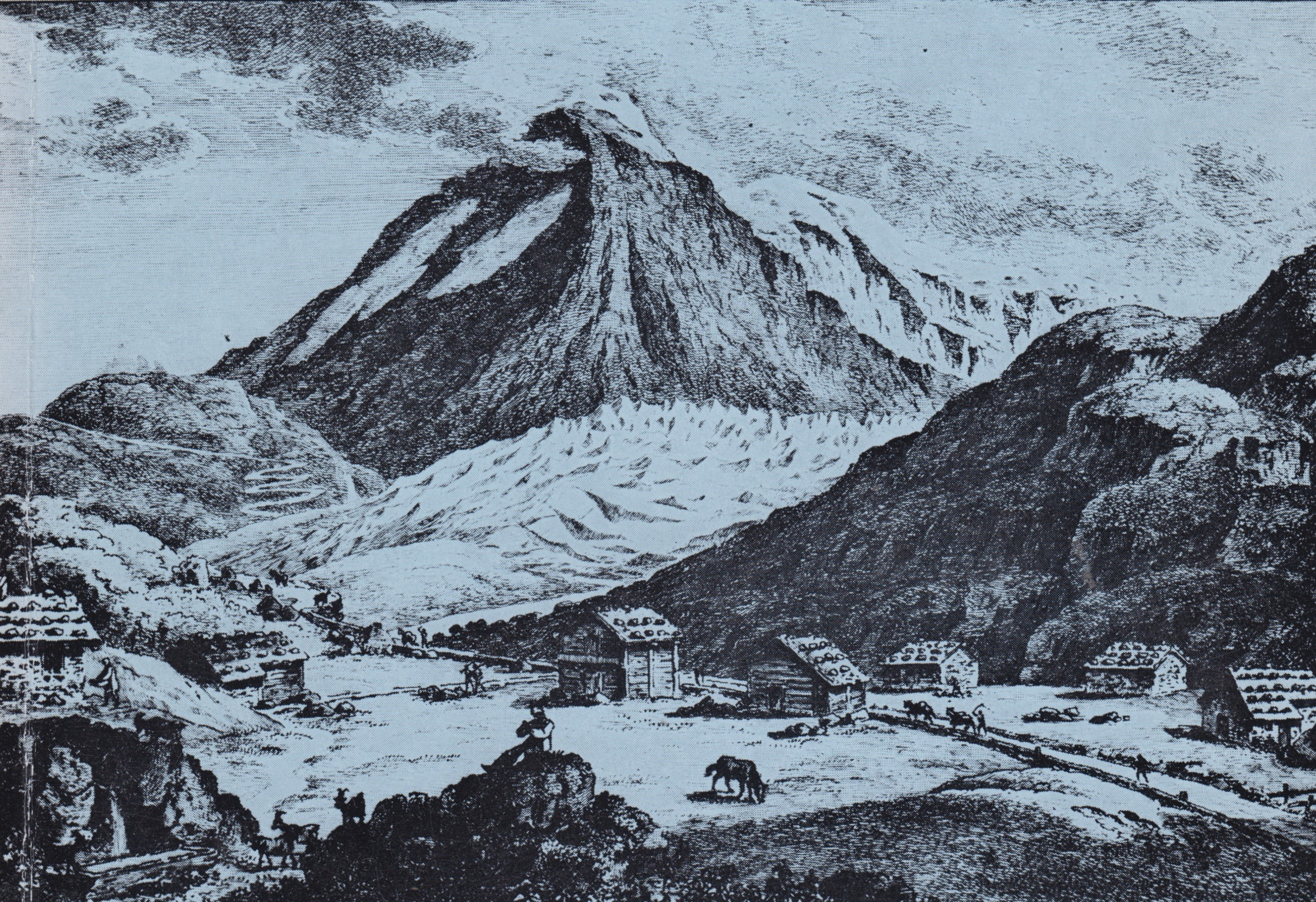
Stein Glacier in 1813, engraving by F.Hegi

The Stein Glacier (German: Steingletscher) is a 4 km long glacier (2005) situated at the Susten Pass in the Urner Alps in the easternmost part of the canton of Bern in Switzerland.In 1973 it had an area of 6.06 km^{2}.

The highest points in the accumulation area are at 3420 meters above sea level. The glacier tongue is currently located at an altitude of 2000 meters. Above the lake Steinsee a second tongue lies west of the Tierbergli mountain. The glacier drains through the Gadmen valley and flows into the river Aare near Innertkirchen.

During the Little Ice Age around the middle of the 19th century, the Stein Glacier was 1 km longer than today. During the retreat, the lake Steinsee formed after 1940 on the plain of the former glacier tongue at an altitude of 1934 meters. There were again strong glacier advances of about 300 meters in 1912–1921 and 1969–1981. The glacier has strongly melted back since. The postglacial history of the glacier and the vegetation has been intensely studied with a multi-disciplinary approach.

== See also ==
- List of glaciers in Switzerland
- Swiss Alps
