= Susten Pass =

Mountain pass in the Swiss Alps

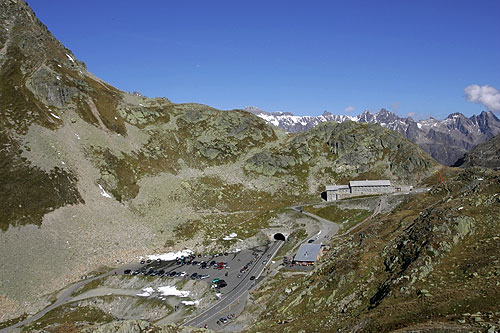
- View of the Bernese side of the pass with the tunnel

- Location within Switzerland
- Elevation: 2,260 m (7,410 ft)
- Traversed by: Road (2,224 m)

Third Approach
- Location: Bern/Uri, Switzerland
- Range: Urner Alps
- Coordinates: 46°43.8′N 08°26.94′E

Susten Pass (German: Sustenpass) (el. 2260 m.) is a mountain pass in the Swiss Alps. The pass road, built from 1938–1945, connects Innertkirchen in the canton of Bern with Wassen in the canton of Uri. A 300-metre long tunnel crosses the pass at 2,224 metres.

The pass is popular with tourists, especially for the views of the Stein Glacier on the south side.

The length and elevation of west/east climbs are respectively:

- Innertkirchen (west): 27km (1599m)
- Wassen (east): 17.7km (1308m)

== History ==
Documents prove the existence of a mule track over the pass since 17th century. While not a primary trade route, its strategic value grew as fortifications were built in the Meien Valley during the 1618 Villmerger Wars.

1798–1799: The pass was used as a key military corridor during the French Revolutionary Wars by the French to trap Austrian and Russian forces.

1811–1818: Following Napoleon's annexation of the Simplon Pass, Switzerland prioritized the Susten route. Construction to widen the mule track into a carriage road began, with the Feden-Meien section opening in 1818.

1938–1946: On the eve of World War II, the Swiss Federal Government, along with the cantons of Bern and Uri, agreed to fully modernize and pave the route for national defense and transport. The current 46-kilometer engineered road features 26 bridges and tunnels and officially opened in September 1946.

Because of its late, deliberate construction, the Susten Pass has wide sweeping curves rather than the tight switchbacks characteristic of older Alpine passes.

== Gallery ==
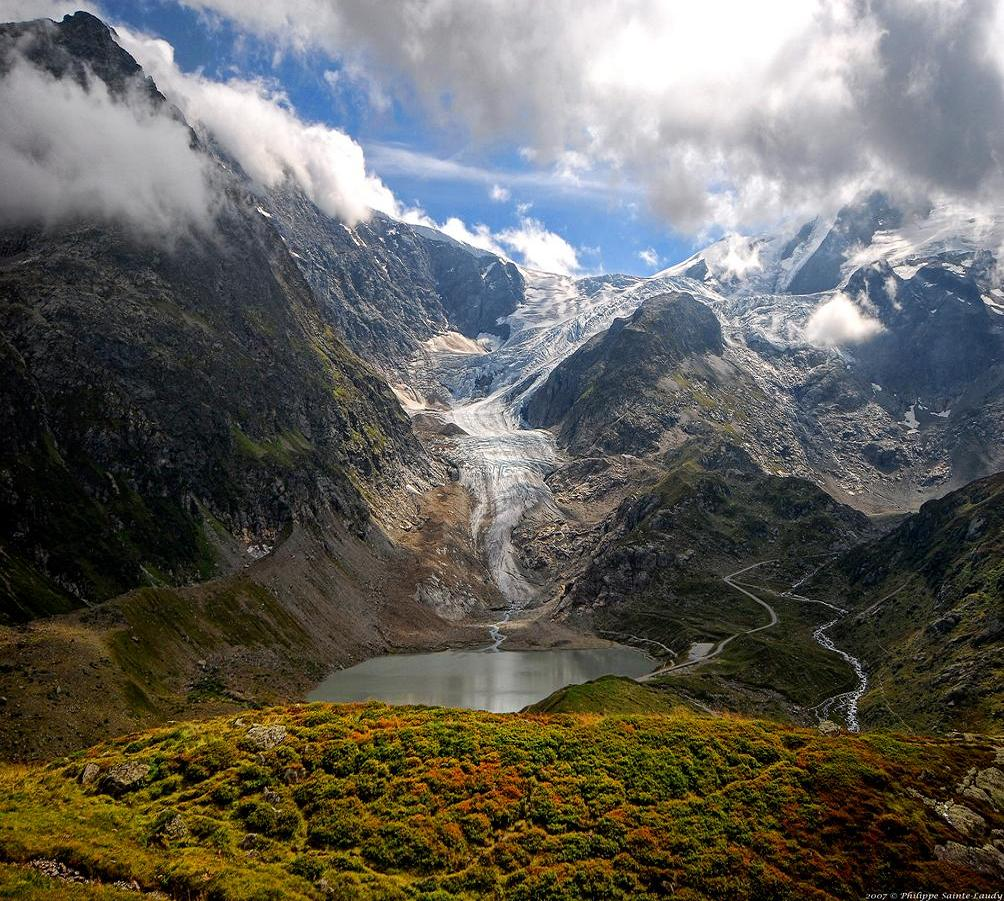
View of Steigletscher from Susten pass

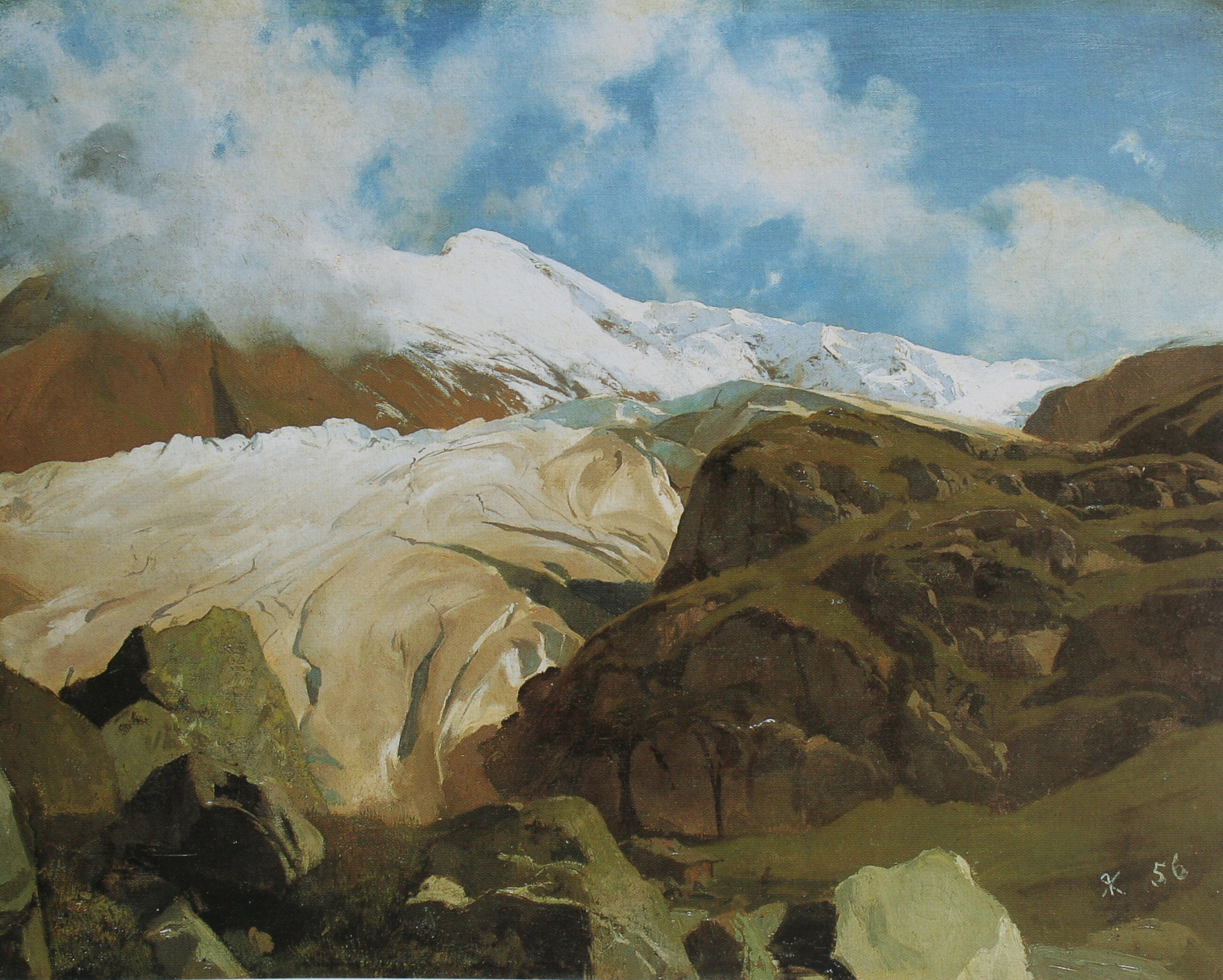
Gletscher in Sustenpass, painted in 1856

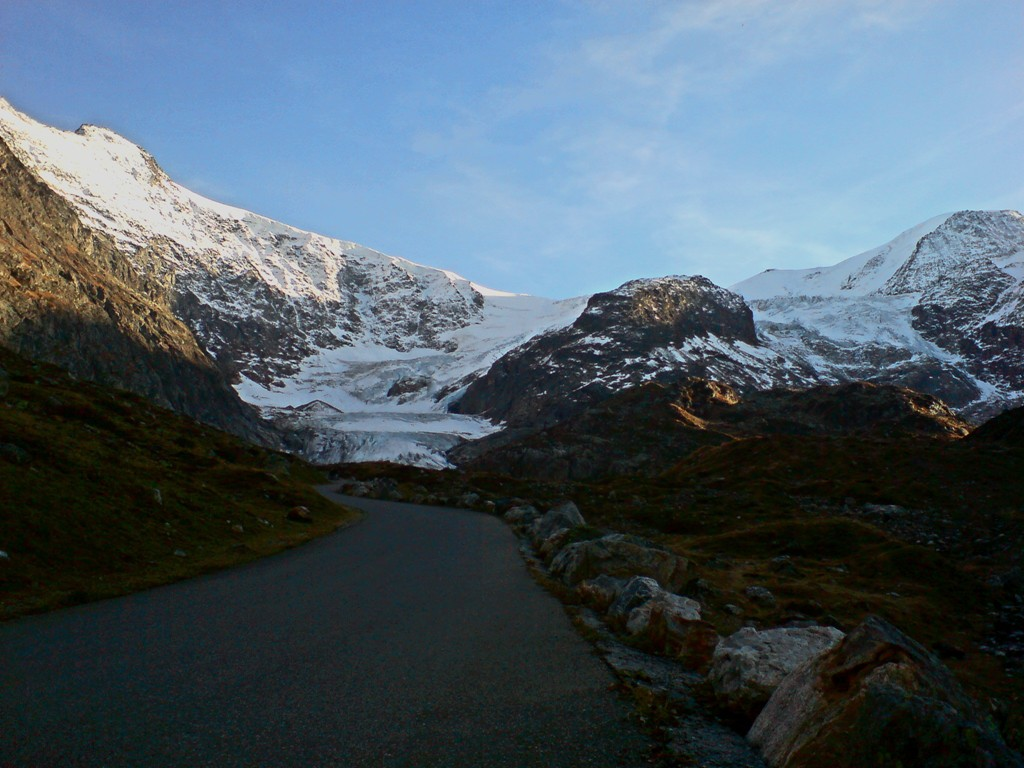
Road to Stein Glacier near Susten pass

== See also ==
- List of highest paved roads in Europe
- List of mountain passes
- List of the highest Swiss passes
