= Piz Buin Pitschen =

Mountain in Switzerland

Piz Buin Pitschen (Romansh) Kleiner Piz Buin (German)
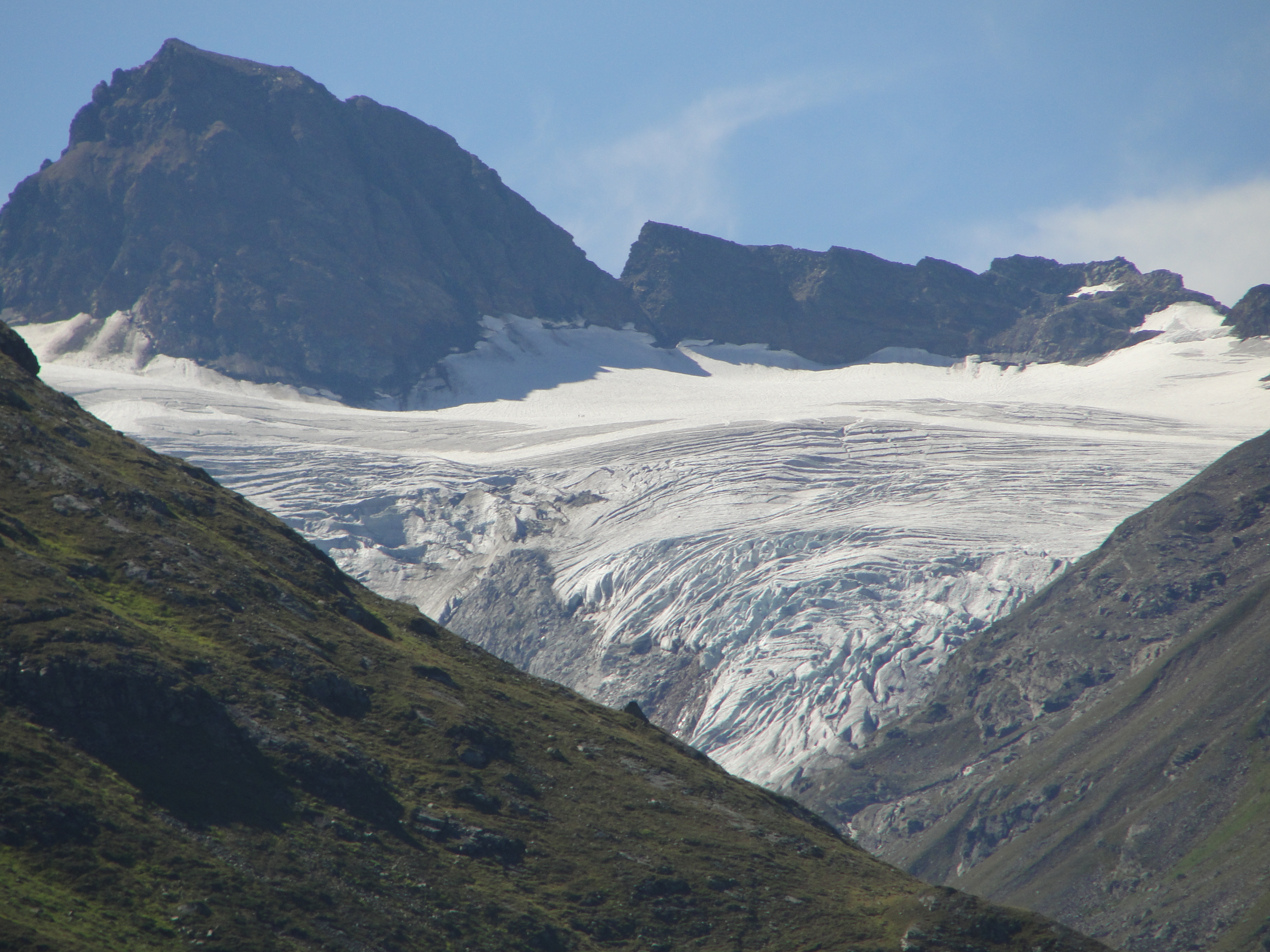
- View from the north with the Ochsentaler Glacier

Highest point
- Elevation: 3,255 m (10,679 ft)
- Prominence: 201 m (659 ft)
- Parent peak: Piz Buin (Grond) (line parent)
- Isolation: 0.44 kilometres (0.27 mi) to Piz Buin
- Coordinates: 46°50′32″N 10°06′45″E

Geography
- Location within Alps Location within Austria Location within Switzerland
- Location: Graubünden, Switzerland; Vorarlberg, Austria
- Parent range: Silvretta Alps

Climbing
- First ascent: 24 August 1868 by O.W. Stein and his guide Christian Jann.
- Easiest route: glacier/rock climb

Piz Buin Pitschen (Rumantsch) or Kleiner Piz Buin (German) is a peak in the Silvretta Alps. The Piz Buin Pitschen lies western of his higher neighbor, the Piz Buin Grond or Großer Piz Buin.

The summit forms the border between Switzerland and Austria and is the second highest peak in Vorarlberg, a state of Austria, and the sixth highest peak of the mountain range after the Piz Linard, the Fluchthorn, the Piz Buin Grond, the Verstanclahorn and the Piz Fliana.

The first ascent was made 1868 by O.W. Stein and his guide Christian Jann.

== Geography ==
The Piz Buin Pitschen lies on the main ridge of the Silvretta alps. It is separated from its more famous neighbour by the Buinlücke (Fourcla Buin), a 3056 m high mountain pass between the two summits.

Piz Buin Pitschen separates two glacial valleys, the Ochsenthaler Glacier on the north and La Cudera on the southwest of the mountain. While the Ochsenthaler Glacier forms the origin of the River Ill, which first fills the Silvretta Reservoir at the Silvretta High-Alpine-Road and later flows into the Rhine (North Sea). South of Piz Buin Pitschen the water flows in the Inn, which empties into the Danube (Black Sea).

In the west, the Fourcla dal Cunfin separates the Piz Buin Pitschen from the 3210 m high Signalhorn. The pass also allows the transition from the Austrian Ochsentaler glacier to the Swiss glacier La Cudera. The glacier La Cudera flows off towards the Tuoi valley, also Swiss, south of the Piz Buin Pitschen, a side valley of the Lower Engadine near Guarda.

The Silvretta High-Alpine-Road, which connects the two Austrian states Vorarlberg and Tyrol, runs along the banks of the Silvretta Reservoir over the 2032 m high Bielerhöhe. The parking facilities there and the bus connection are the starting point for the access to the Wiesbadener hut, from where the easiest route to the summit starts.

== Climbing routes ==
The Piz Buin Pitschen is climbed in compared to its higher neighbor, the Piz Buin Grond rather rarely. It can be done both in summer as a glacier and rock climb and in winter as ski touring.

The route of the first ascent led from the Silvretta hut (2341 m) over the Silvretta pass to the summit.

The easiest route leads from the Wiesbadener hut (2443 m) in Vorarlberg over the Buinlücke (Fourcla Buin) and the west ridge to the summit. The Piz Buin Pitschen can also be climbed from the Chamonna Tuoi (2250 m) in the Swiss Tuoi valley over the glacier La Cudera and Fourcla dal Cunfin or the Vermuntpass.

The ascent of the Kleine Piz Buin leads in any case over glacier and requires climbing at level II in the UIAA grading system, which can be surpassed by the melting of the glacier.

== Name and history ==
The name Piz Buin is derived from the Rumantsch and means "Ochsenspitze" in German what can be translated with "Ox-peak". This name is supplemented in Rumantsch with Grond and Pitschen to distinguish the two summits from each other. If someone only says "Piz Buin", then normally the Piz Buin Grond is meant.

The first ascent of the Piz Buin Pitschen took place on 24 August 1868 by O.W. Stein and Christian Jann, about three years after that of the Piz Buin Grond. Their path led from Klosters via Alp Spörra and Sardasca to the "Clubhütte", today the Silvretta hut, as O.W. Stein describes in his report. From there they climbed over a crevasse glacier towards the Silvretta Pass, where Stein and his guide decided to climb the Piz Buin Pitschen after a rest at the "Mittagsplatte" (Plan da Mezdi) due to the good weather. Stein reports of a rugged rock ridge. At the top, a little cairn was built, which contained in a paper in a bottle with the names of the two climbers. They chose the descent "north along the ridge".

O.W. Stein stated in his report the height of the mountain with 3264 m.
