= Piz da las Clavigliadas =

Mountain in Switzerland

- Location within Switzerland

Highest point
- Elevation: 2,983 m (9,787 ft)
- Prominence: 169 m (554 ft)
- Parent peak: Piz Cotschen
- Coordinates: 46°49′50.5″N 10°9′7.6″E

Geography
- Location: Graubünden, Switzerland
- Parent range: Silvretta Alps

Piz da las Clavigliadas is a mountain of the Swiss Silvretta Alps, located north of Guarda in the canton of Graubünden. It lies between the valleys of Val Tuoi and Val Tasna, south of the Dreiländerspitze.
