= Krone (mountain) =

Mountain in Switzerland

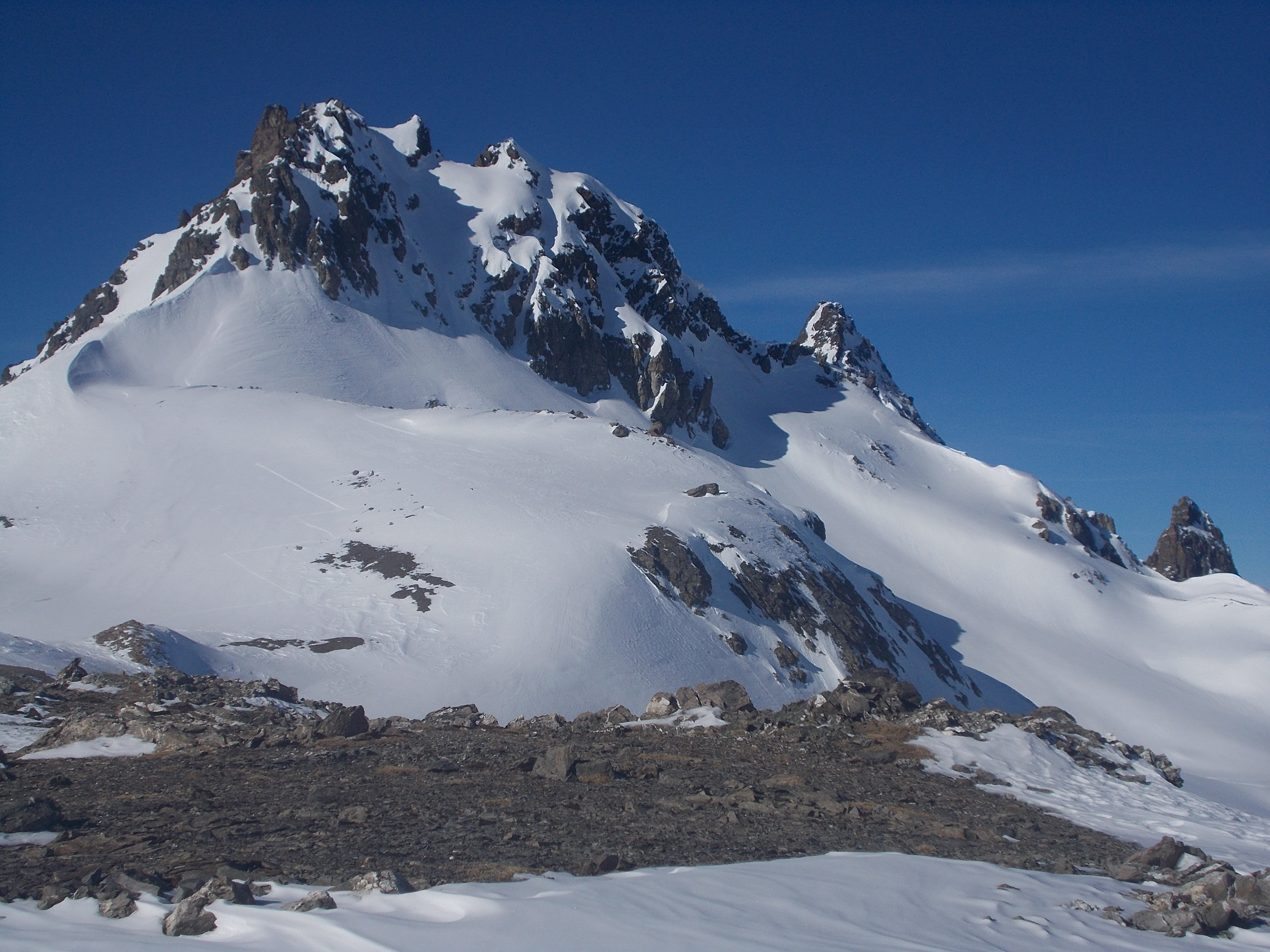
- Krone (left) and Fluchthorn (right, behind) from south-east

Highest point
- Elevation: 3,187 m (10,456 ft)
- Prominence: 243 m (797 ft)
- Parent peak: Fluchthorn
- Coordinates: 46°52′32.5″N 10°13′55″E

Geography
- Location within Alps
- Location: Graubünden, Switzerland; Tyrol, Austria
- Parent range: Silvretta Alps

Krone (3,187 m) is a mountain of the Silvretta Alps, located on the border between Austria and Switzerland. It lies south of the Fluchthorn, on the range between the Jamtal (Tyrol) and the Val Fenga (Graubünden). 1 km in southeast from Krone stands the "Breite Krone" = Coruna Lada (3079 m). The Kronenjoch (2974 m) is a saddle between Jamtal/Futschöltal and Val Fenga in the south of the Krone.
