= Roggenhorn =

Mountain in Switzerland

- Location within Switzerland

Highest point
- Elevation: 2,891 m (9,485 ft)
- Prominence: 140 m (460 ft)
- Parent peak: Piz Linard
- Coordinates: 46°50′3.8″N 10°0′28.1″E

Geography
- Location: Graubünden, Switzerland
- Parent range: Silvretta Alps

The Roggenhorn is a mountain of the Swiss Silvretta Alps, located east of Klosters in the canton of Graubünden. It lies between the valleys of Verstancla and Vernela, west of the Verstanclahorn.
