= Unghürhörner =

Mountain in Switzerland

- Location within Switzerland

Highest point
- Elevation: 2,994 m (9,823 ft)
- Prominence: 206 m (676 ft)
- Parent peak: Piz Linard
- Coordinates: 46°48′45″N 10°00′47″E

Geography
- Location: Graubünden, Switzerland
- Parent range: Silvretta Alps

The Unghürhörner are a multi-summited mountain of the Silvretta Alps, located south-east of Klosters in the canton of Graubünden. They lie in the Vereina valley, west of the Plattenhörner.

The main summit has an elevation of 2,994 metres above sea level. A nearly equally high secondary summit has an elevation of 2,992 metres.
