= Piz Chapisun =

Mountain in Switzerland

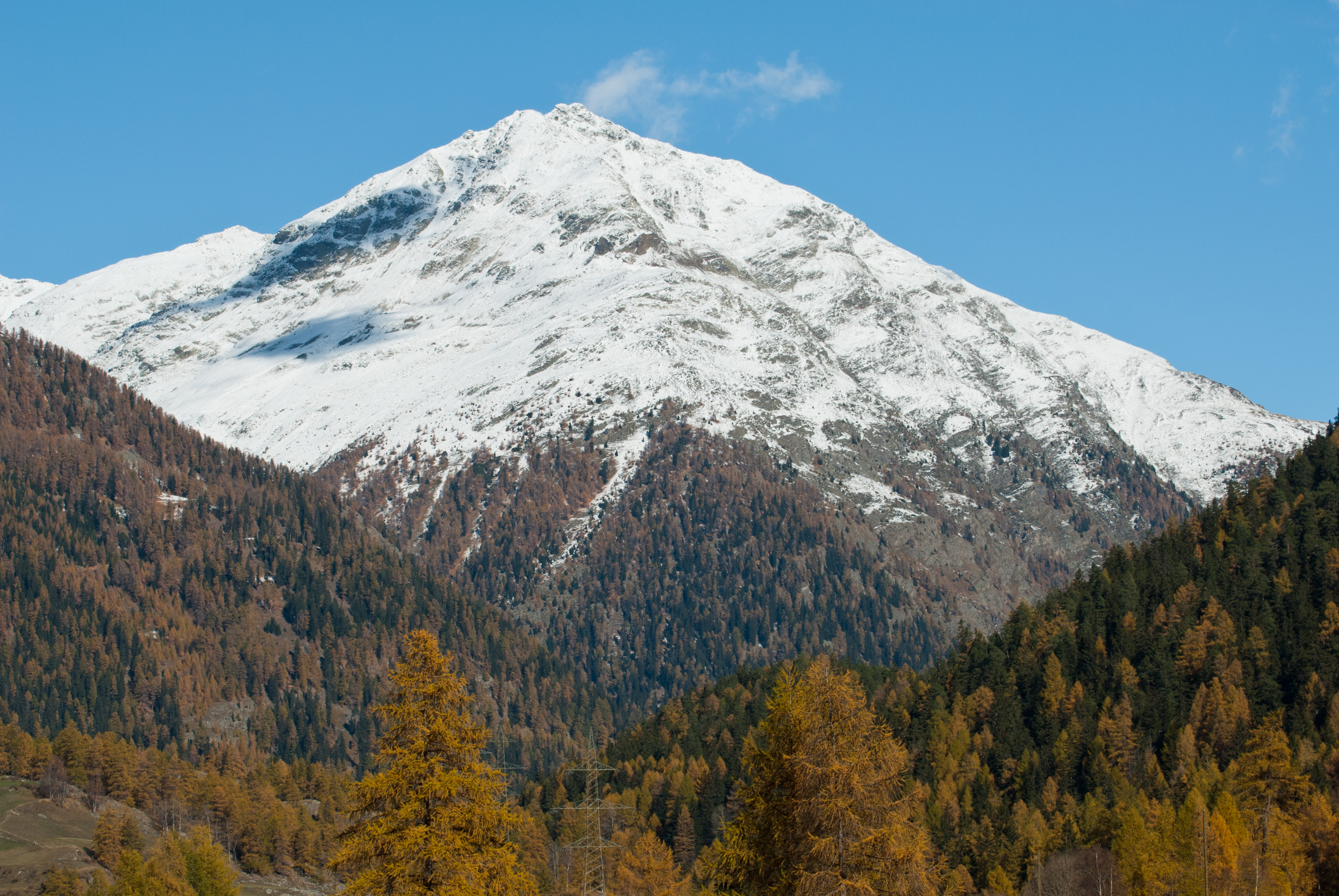
- View from the south side

Highest point
- Elevation: 2,931 m (9,616 ft)
- Prominence: 198 m (650 ft)
- Coordinates: 46°47′38″N 10°07′03″E

Geography
- Location within Switzerland
- Location: Graubünden, Switzerland
- Parent range: Silvretta Alps

Piz Chapisun (2,931 m) is a mountain of the Silvretta Alps, overlooking Lavin in the canton of Graubünden. It lies at the southern end of the range south of Piz Buin, between the Val Lavinuoz and the Val Tuoi.
