= Piz Murtera =

Mountain in Switzerland

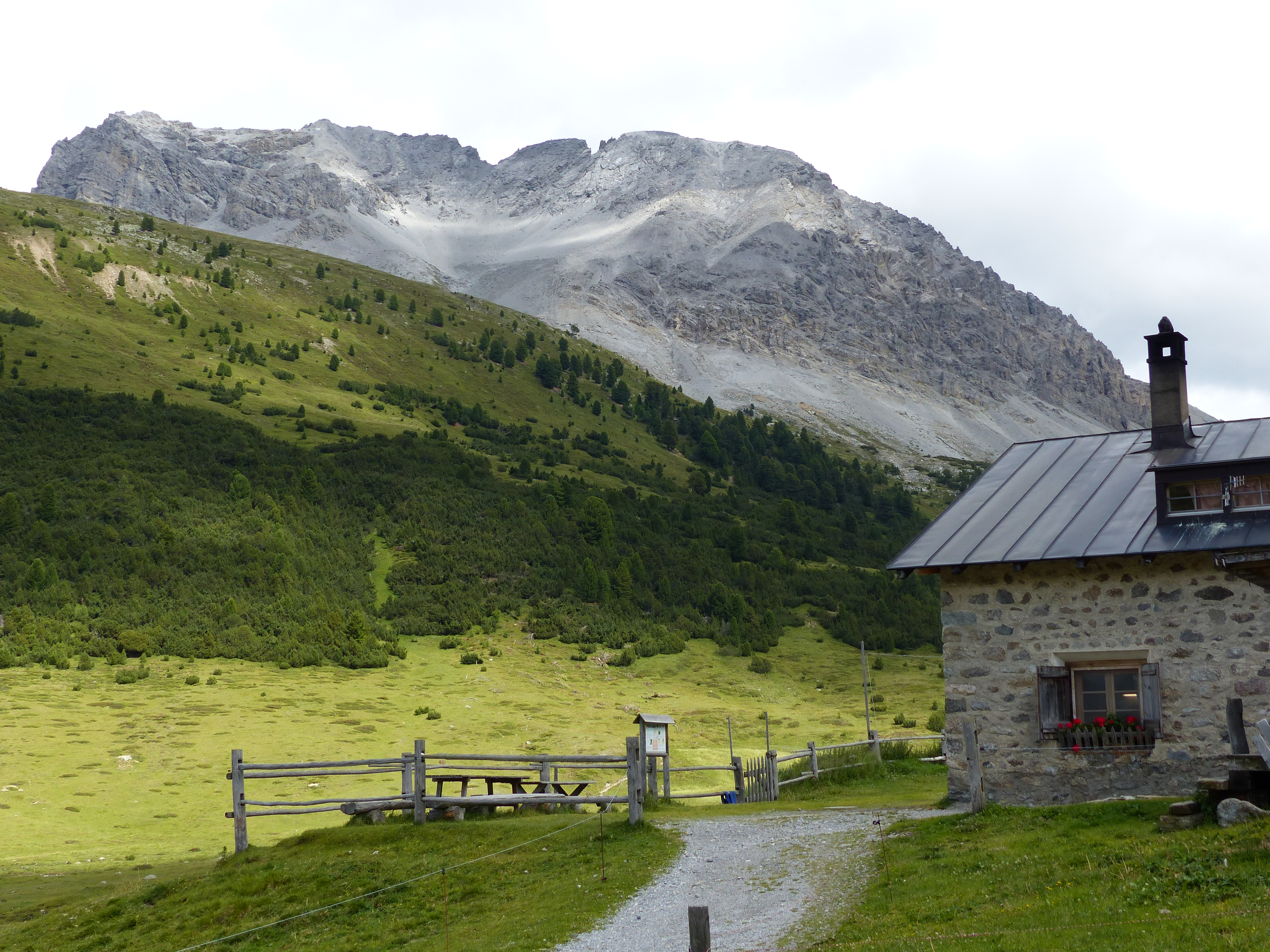
- Piz Murtera

Highest point
- Elevation: 3,044 m (9,987 ft)
- Prominence: 459 m (1,506 ft)
- Parent peak: Piz Linard
- Listing: Alpine mountains above 3000 m
- Coordinates: 46°46′31.5″N 10°02′24.7″E

Geography
- Location within Switzerland
- Location: Graubünden, Switzerland
- Parent range: Silvretta Alps

Piz Murtera (3,044 m) is a mountain of the Silvretta Alps, overlooking Susch in the Swiss canton of Graubünden. It is the culminating point of the small group lying south of the Vereina Pass, between the Val Fless and the Val Sagliains.
