= Schildflue =

Mountain in Switzerland

- Location within Switzerland

Highest point
- Elevation: 2,887 m (9,472 ft)
- Prominence: 333 m (1,093 ft)
- Parent peak: Piz Linard
- Coordinates: 46°52′50.7″N 9°57′25.6″E

Geography
- Location: Graubünden, Switzerland
- Parent range: Silvretta Alps

The Schildflue is a mountain of the Silvretta Alps, located east of Klosters in the canton of Graubünden. With an elevation of 2,887 metres above sea level, the Schildflue is the culminating point of the range that separates the Schlappintal from the valley of Monbiel.
