= Chessler =

Mountain in Switzerland

- Location within Switzerland

Highest point
- Elevation: 2,836 m (9,304 ft)
- Prominence: 95 m (312 ft)
- Parent peak: Leidhorn
- Coordinates: 46°52′18.6″N 9°59′32.1″E

Geography
- Location: Graubünden, Switzerland
- Parent range: Silvretta Alps

The Chessler is a mountain of the Silvretta Alps, overlooking the valley of Monbiel, east of Klosters in the canton of Graubünden.
