= Piz Cotschen =

Mountain in Switzerland

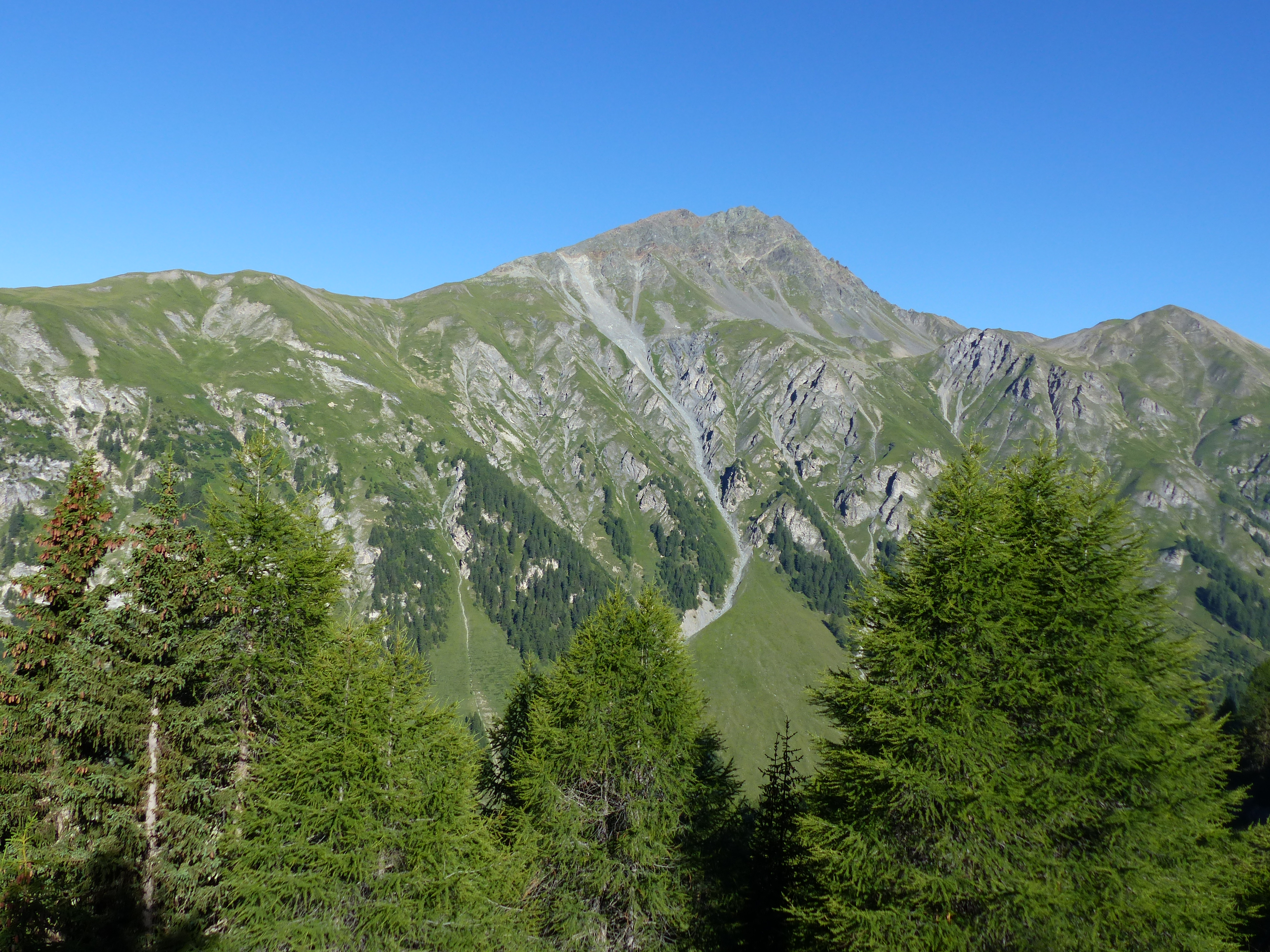
- Piz Cotschen.jpg

Highest point
- Elevation: 3,031 m (9,944 ft)
- Prominence: 296 m (971 ft)
- Parent peak: Piz Linard
- Listing: Alpine mountains above 3000 m
- Coordinates: 46°48′47.2″N 10°10′36.2″E

Geography
- Location within Switzerland
- Location: Graubünden, Switzerland
- Parent range: Silvretta Alps

Piz Cotschen is a mountain of the Swiss Silvretta Alps, located north of Guarda and Ardez in the canton of Graubünden. It lies between the valleys of Val Tuoi and Val Tasna.
