= Piz Davo Lais =

Mountain in Switzerland

- Location within Switzerland

Highest point
- Elevation: 3,027 m (9,931 ft)
- Prominence: 220 m (720 ft)
- Parent peak: Fluchthorn
- Coordinates: 46°52′43.2″N 10°16′03.7″E

Geography
- Location: Graubünden, Switzerland
- Parent range: Silvretta Alps

Piz Davo Lais is a mountain of the Silvretta Alps, located between the Val Fenga and the Val Sinestra in the canton of Graubünden.
