= Piz Buin =

Alpine mountain peak

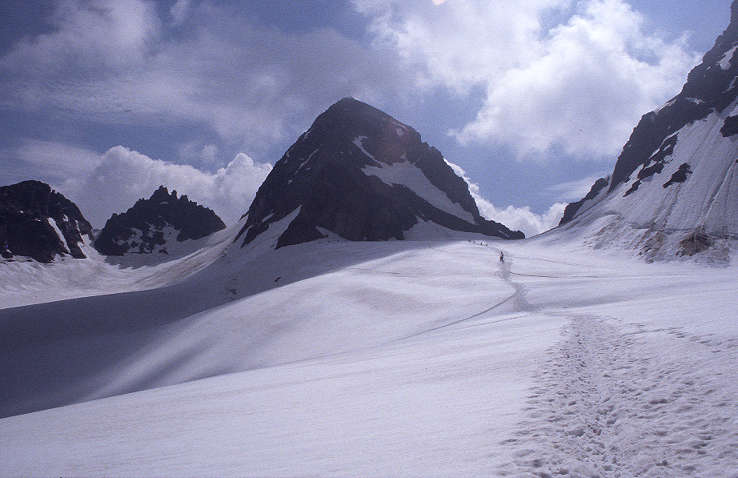
- View from the Ochsentaler Glacier, July 2001

Highest point
- Elevation: 3,312 m (10,866 ft)
- Prominence: 544 m (1,785 ft)
- Parent peak: Fluchthorn
- Isolation: 6.1 km (3.8 mi) to Piz Linard
- Listing: Alpine mountains above 3000 m
- Coordinates: 46°50′44″N 10°07′11″E

Geography
- Location within Alps Location within Austria Location within Switzerland
- Location: Vorarlberg, Austria; Graubünden, Switzerland
- Parent range: Silvretta Alps

Climbing
- First ascent: 14 July 1865 by Joseph Anton Specht und Johann Jakob Weilenmann, guided by Jakob Pfitscher und Franz Pöll.
- Easiest route: glacier/snow climb

Piz Buin (Romansh pronunciation: [ˌpits buˈiːn]) is a mountain in the Silvretta range of the Alps on the border between Austria and Switzerland. It forms the border between the Swiss canton of Graubünden and the Austrian state of Vorarlberg and is the highest peak in Vorarlberg.

Its full name in the Romansh language is Piz Buin Grond (Great Piz Buin). A similar but smaller summit nearby is called Piz Buin Pitschen (Small Piz Buin) at 3,255 m (10,680 ft). Piz Buin was first climbed on 14 July 1865 by Joseph Anton Specht and Johann Jakob Weilenmann, guided by Jakob Pfitscher and Franz Pöll. Piz Buin Pitschen was climbed three years later.

Piz Buin can be reached from the Wiesbadener hut, crossing the Vermunt glacier, climbing up the Wiesbadener ridge and hiking over the Ochsentaler Glacier to the Buin gap. From the gap there is a zigzag walk to the top, with only a 20 m (65 ft) steep step to surmount before reaching the relatively flat summit space, which has an old wooden cross on the very top. The border between Switzerland and Austria crosses the summit from East to West.

== Location and Surroundings ==
As part of the main Silvretta ridge, the mountain marks the border between Austria and Switzerland or Vorarlberg and the canton of Grisons, which runs across the summit in a west-easterly direction. To the west, separated by the Buinlücke pass, lies the Kleine Piz Buin, also known as Piz Buin Pitschen on some maps (3255 m). The Ochsental Glacier extends to the north and west of the Grosser Piz Buin, while the Vermunt Glacier lies to the northeast, separated from the Ochsental Glacier by the Wiesbadner Grätle. These two glaciers, located on Austrian territory, form the source of the Ill, which flows north through the Ochsental valley to the Silvretta Reservoir in Vermunt on the Bielerhöhe. To the south of the Vermunt glacier, the 2797 m high Vermunt Pass forms the transition into the Swiss Val Tuoi, a side valley of the Lower Engadine, which extends south of Piz Buin to Guarda and belongs to the municipality of Scuol.To the southwest of Piz Buin are the Cronsel rock spur and behind it the Plan Rai firn field, followed by Piz Fliana. To the west of Kleiner Piz Buin, the terrain is also glaciated, where the Vadret Tiatscha is located, which merges into the Silvretta Glacier via the Silvretta Pass and the Verstanclator into the Verstancla Glacier via the Verstanclator. To the northwest, the ridge leads from the Kleiner Piz Buin to the Fuorcla dal Cunfin and over to the Signalhorn. In the Silvretta, Piz Buin is only surpassed in height by the huge pyramid of Piz Linard (3410 m) and the Fluchthorn (3397 m).

== Geology and Flora ==
Piz Buin, like the surrounding peaks of the Silvretta, is made up of crystalline rock which consist mainly of gneiss. In contrast to the higher peaks of Piz Linard and Fluchthorn, which are mainly composed of hornblende gneiss and schist, Piz Buin is composed of lighter granite and augen gneiss.

The vegetation is sparse, as is generally the case in the higher regions of the Silvretta, and consists of rock and debris-dwelling plants of the nival zone. In addition to lichens and mosses, the glacier buttercup should be mentioned, which even flowers on the summit of Piz Buin.

== Base Point and Trails ==
On the Austrian side, next to the Bieler Höhe, is the Wiesbadener Hütte (2443 m) on the east side of the Ochsental. From there, the traditional normal route leads south over the Vermunt Glacier and further west to the Wiesbadener Grätle, from where you cross the Ochsental Glacier to the Buinlücke. On the ascent to the Wiesbadener Grätle, there are sections of grade level II (UIAA) to overcome. As the glacier under the Wiesbadener Grätle has continued to melt since around the year 2000, this route has become increasingly difficult and risky and because of the risk of falling rocks the route has been considered for closure. The lower ice level is making it increasingly difficult to access, so that in midsummer it can often reach difficulty level IV+ or even be completely impassable.

An alternative to this route leads from the Wiesbadener Hütte or directly from the Bieler Höhe to the Ochsentaler Glacier and over this to the Buinlücke. This ascent is a popular ski tour in winter.

The Buinlücke can also be reached from the Tuoi hut (2250 m) in Val Tuoi, usually via the Fuorcla dal Cunfin to the west of the Kleiner Piz Buin and then via the Ochsental glacier. This route is also frequently used in winter with touring skis. In avalanche-safe conditions, a direct descent through the Buinlücke towards the Tuoihütte is possible for very good skiers (narrow and approx. 40° steep in the upper section).

The route over the Fuorcla dal Cunfin can also be reached from the Swiss Silvretta hut (2341 m) via the Silvretta glacier and Silvretta Pass.

What all these routes have in common is the ascent to the summit from the Buinlücke: It leads over the west flank to the northwest ridge and over this through the so-called chimney to the scree-covered west flank and over this to the summit without any difficulty. The exposed crux in the chimney is rated I to III.

== Hazard Zone Buinlücke - Normal Route Piz Buin ==
The Office for Natural Hazards of the Canton of Graubünden and the Institute for Snow and Avalanche Research in Davos have been warning of a major rockfall on the Kleiner Piz Buin (Piz Buin Pitschen) since autumn 2022, which also directly affects the area of the Buinlücke (Fuorcla Buin) and the lower section of the normal route on Piz Buin. Measurements carried out in 2022 showed that over twenty thousand cubic meters of rock material (including large boulders) had already fallen within the year as a result of rockfall/blockfall and that, unlike in previous years, the rock mass was now increasingly in motion. The normal route to the summit initially led directly over the freshly erupted rock material, so that the ascent is directly in the danger zone and the major rockfall expected in the next five years would put climbers on the normal route at considerable risk. This should be taken into account when planning a tour, especially in unfavorable weather conditions such as prolonged/heavy rainfall and prolonged heat with strong sunlight. The endangered area of the normal route should therefore be crossed quickly and individually with the greatest possible distance to the foot of the Kleiner Piz Buin in order to minimize the risks. A ski descent from the Buinlücke in the direction of the Tuoi hut should no longer be undertaken, as this area down to the hut is particularly at risk, especially in winter.

== Name and History ==
Piz Buin is a Rhaeto-Romanic name meaning 'Ox Head', with the 'Buin' stressed on the second syllable. The almost flat valley floor at the end of the Ochsental, which is now flooded by the Silvretta reservoir, used to be pastureland. Grazing animals are still kept in the vicinity of the reservoir.

The original Rhaeto-Romanic name is Piz Buin Grond (Great Piz Buin), as opposed to the smaller Piz Buin, Piz Buin Pitschen. Other names that are hardly used today were "Albuinkopf" in Vorarlberg and "Albainkopf" in Tyrol.

The first ascent was made on 14 July 1865 by Josef Anton Specht and Johann Jakob Weilenmann, accompanied by Jakob Pfitscher and Franz Pöll. Their original plan was to reach the Wiesbadener Grätle from the Bielerhöhe from the east, cross it and climb to the Buinlücke (3054m) via the gently sloping upper part of the ice stream, now called the Ochsentaler Glacier. However, as an ascent via the (still existing) icefall to the north-west of the Wiesbadener Grätle promised faster progress, they left the Grätle to the east and reached the summit via the Buinlücke and the west flank in five hours.

The first descent was back to the Buinlücke. The route continued along the northern foot of the smaller Piz Buin to the saddle south of the Signalhorn, the "Fuorcla dal Cunfin", and from there through the Swiss Val Tuoi to Klosters.

The names of the glaciers in the Piz Buin area used to be different from those used today. In his description of the first ascent, Weilenmann referred to the ice field now commonly known as the "Vermunt Glacier", framed by the Dreiländerspitze, Vermuntpaß, Piz Buin and Wiesbadener Grätle, as the "Fermunt - or Ochsenthal Glacier" and the "Main Glacier". The ice stream surrounded by the Wiesbadener Grätle, the Buinen, the Signalhorn and the Silvrettahorn, now called the Ochsentaler Glacier, over which the first ascent was made, he saw as a "side glacier" of the ice field now called the Vermuntgletscher.

Even Hermine and Walther Flaig, in an essay ("100 Jahre Piz Buin") to mark the centenary of the first ascent, spoke of a "crevasse labyrinth of the western Vermunt glacier", referring to the icefall of the present-day Ochsental glacier.

At the time of the first ascents, both glaciers joined below the Grüne Kuppe (2579 m) in front of the Wiesbadener Grätli to the north, forming a medial moraine. Today, they have been greatly reduced by glacial melting and are separate ice fields, widely separated by the Wiesbadener Grätle and the Grüne Kuppe.

On 13 September 1936, Vorarlberg's first summit cross was erected on Piz Buin. The Christian-socialist newspaper the Vorarlberger Volksblatt described the highly symbolic action as a "sign that this country is and will remain Christian despite all the attacks of the 'conquerors of Christianity'" (meaning the Communists and the Nazis) and described the transport of the cross to the summit as a "crusade of the Reichsbund", which "can hardly be explained physically, but can only be understood by the faith that moves mountains". In the summer of 2012, a new summit cross was flown to the mountain on behalf of the ÖAV, after the previous one, believed to date from the 1950s, had weathered and become misaligned.

== Trivia ==
The mountain also gives its name to the 'Piz Buin' sun protection products of the pharmaceutical company Johnson & Johnson. The chemist Franz Greiter was sunburned while climbing the peak in 1938 and in the following years developed the sunscreen of the same name.

== See also ==
- List of mountains of Switzerland
