= Rotbüelspitz =

Mountain in Switzerland

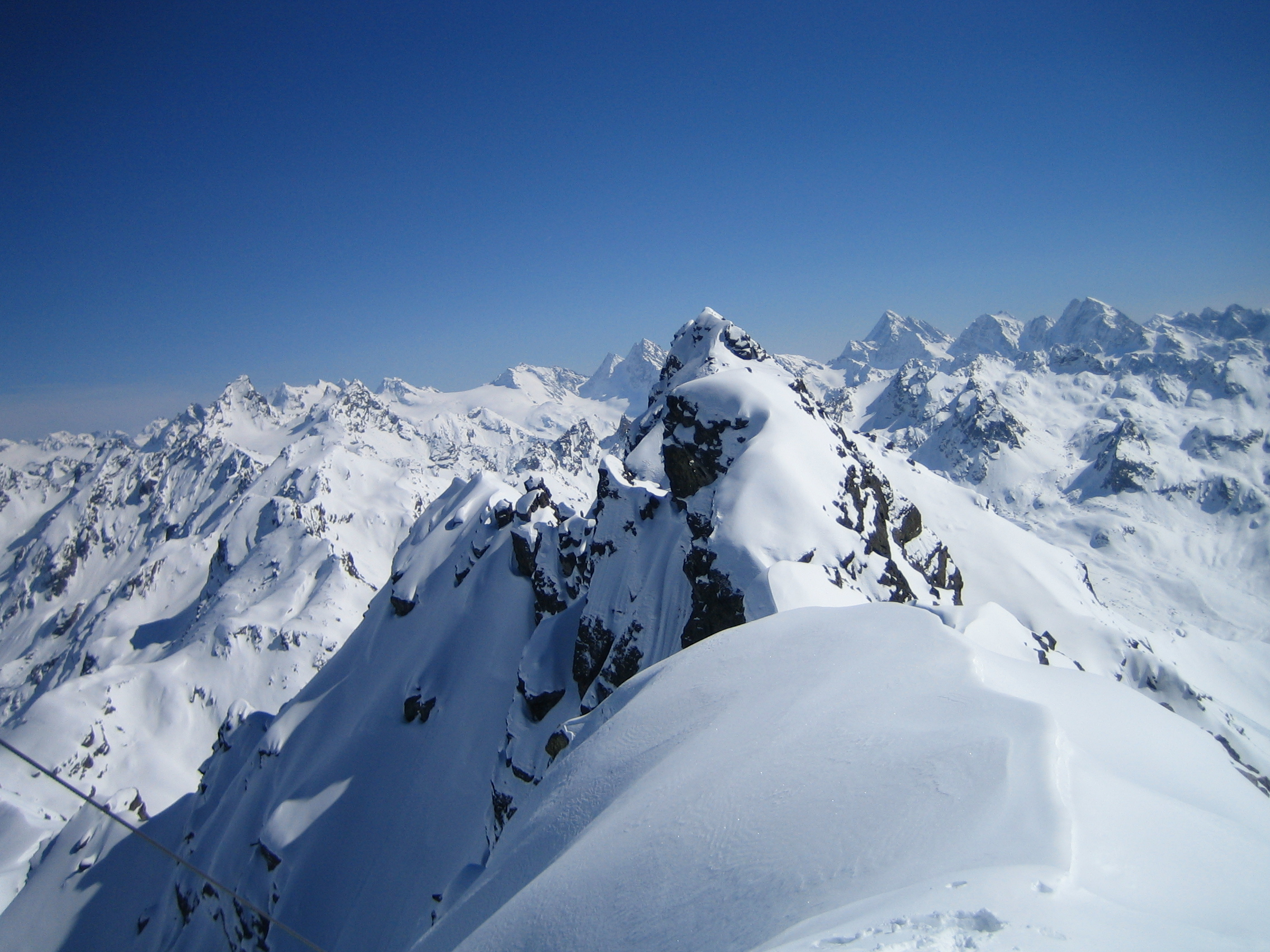
- View from Rotbühelspitze in winter towards Silvretta

Highest point
- Elevation: 2,852 m (9,357 ft)
- Prominence: 42 m (138 ft)
- Parent peak: Isentällispitz
- Coordinates: 46°54′57.4″N 9°57′32.1″E

Geography
- Location within Alps
- Location: Graubünden, Switzerland; Vorarlberg, Austria
- Parent range: Silvretta Alps

Climbing
- Easiest route: Gargellen (Austria) - Wintertal - Summit

The Rotbüelspitz (also spelled Rotbühelspitze) is a mountain of the Silvretta Alps, located on the border between Austria and Switzerland. It is located north of the slightly higher Isentällispitz.
