= Piz Minschun =

Mountain in Switzerland

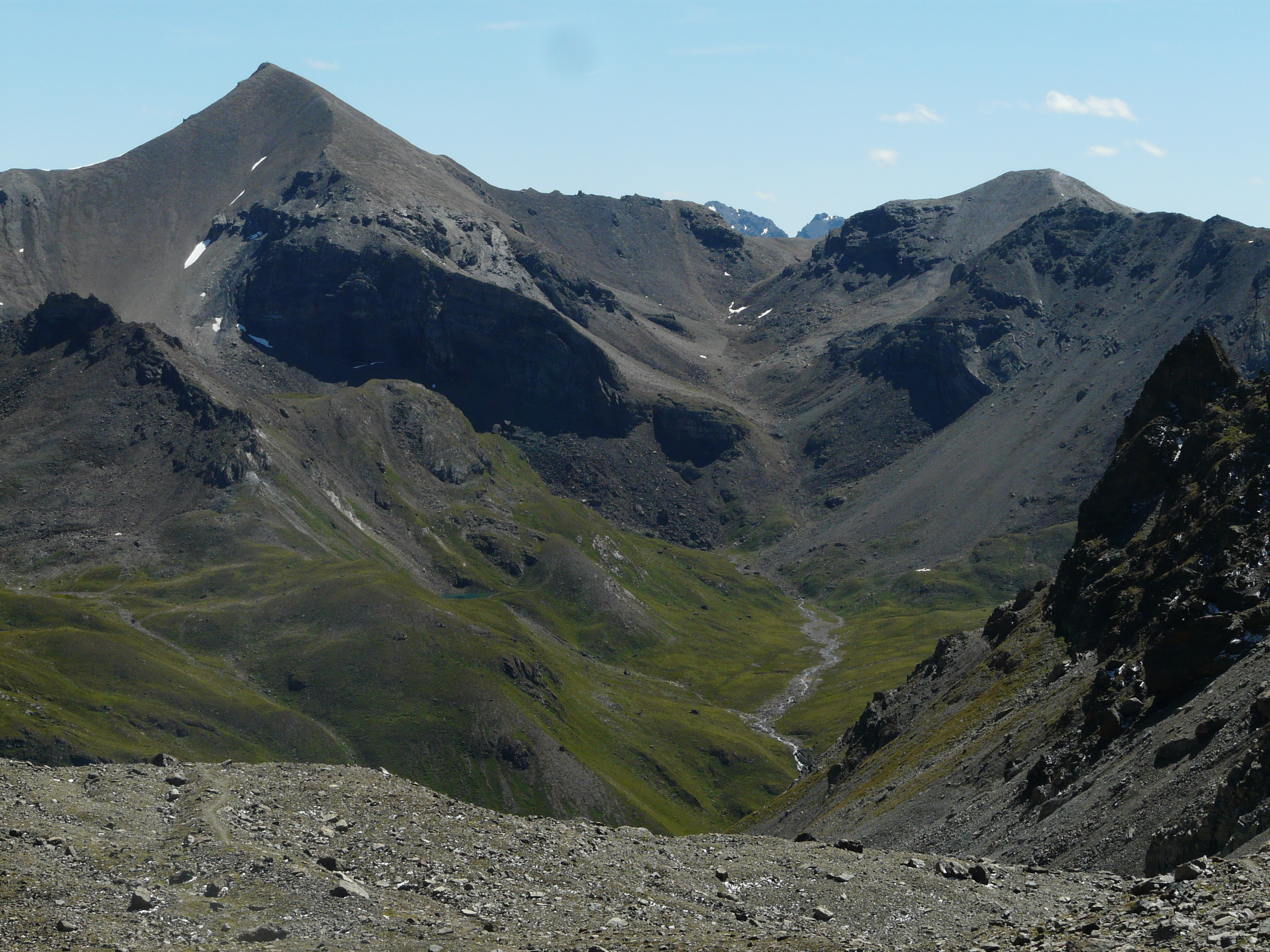
- Piz Minschun as seen from the Futschöl pass

Highest point
- Elevation: 3,068 m (10,066 ft)
- Prominence: 269 m (883 ft)
- Parent peak: Fluchthorn
- Coordinates: 46°49′53.5″N 10°14′28.3″E

Geography
- Location within Switzerland
- Location: Graubünden, Switzerland
- Parent range: Silvretta Alps

Piz Minschun is a mountain of the Silvretta Alps, overlooking Scuol in the Swiss canton of Graubünden. From the heights of Scuol (south side), a trail lead to the summit.
