= Piz d'Anschatscha =

Mountain in Switzerland

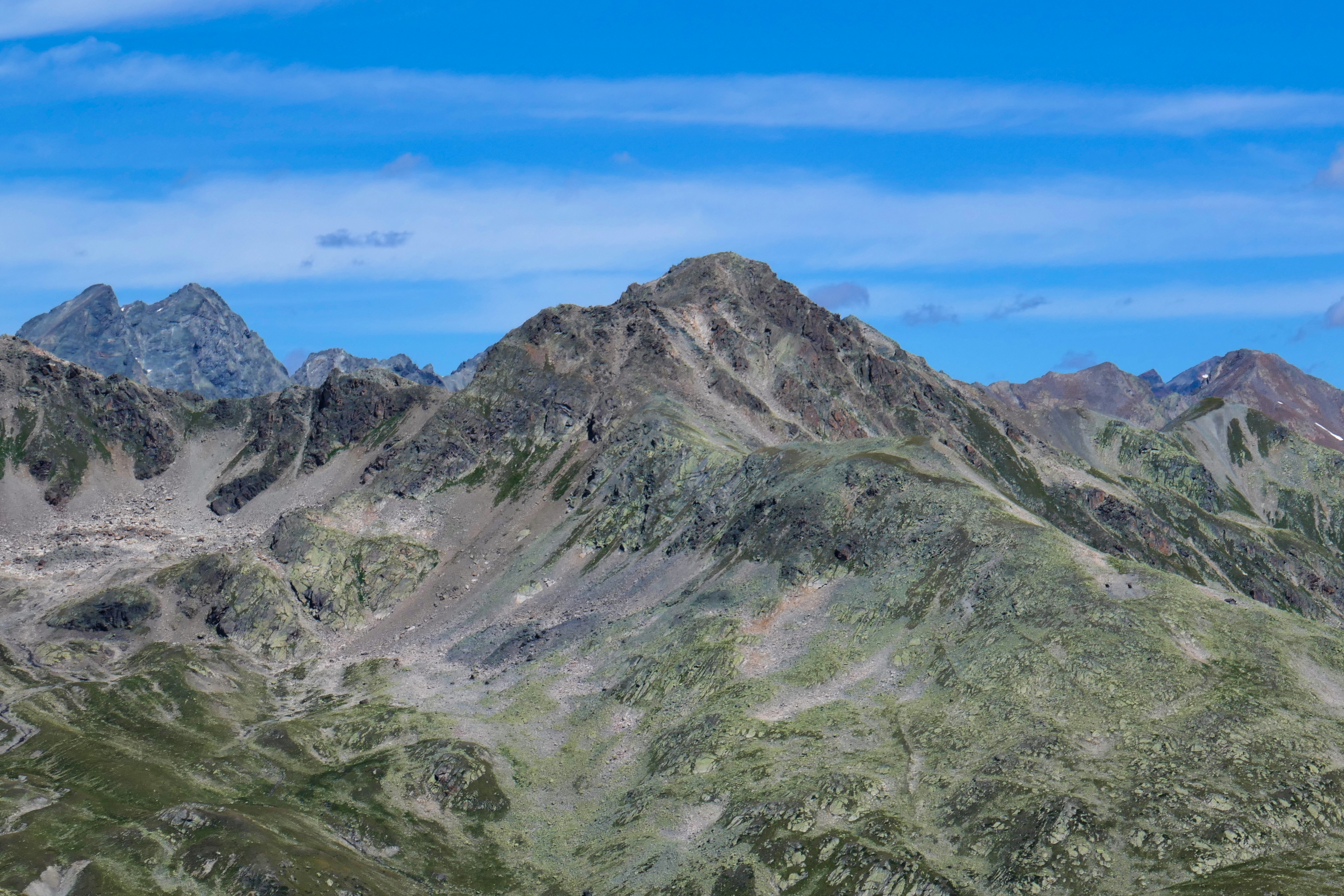
- Piz Champatsch

Highest point
- Elevation: 2,983 m (9,787 ft)
- Prominence: 135 m (443 ft)
- Parent peak: Piz Fliana
- Coordinates: 46°49′02″N 10°6′39″E

Geography
- Location within Switzerland
- Location: Graubünden, Switzerland
- Parent range: Silvretta Alps

Piz d'Anschatscha is a mountain of the Silvretta Alps, located north of Guarda in the canton of Graubünden. It lies south of Piz Fliana, on the watershed between the valleys of Lavinuoz and Tuoi.

Piz d'Anschatscha has two summits: the northern one (2,983 m) and the southern one (2,978 m). On the south is the slightly lower Piz Champatsch (2,958 m)
