= Signalhorn (Silvretta Alps) =

Mountain in Switzerland

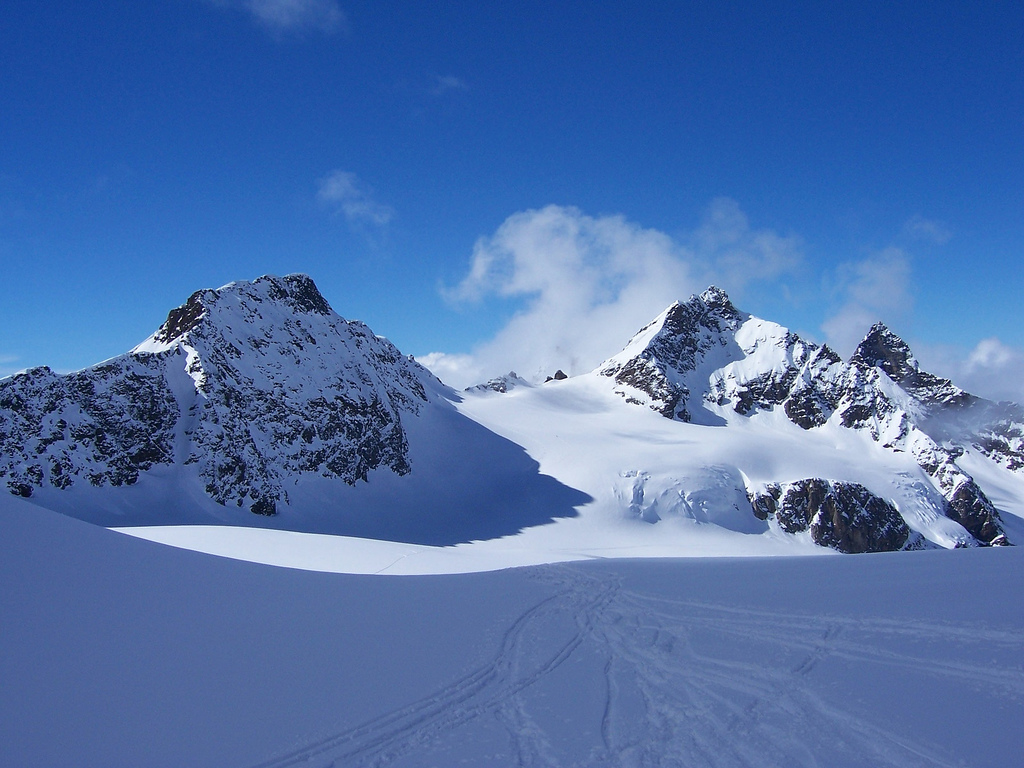
- Signalhorn (left) and Silvrettahorn (right) from the east

Highest point
- Elevation: 3,207 m (10,522 ft)
- Prominence: 162 m (531 ft)
- Parent peak: Silvrettahorn
- Coordinates: 46°50′56″N 10°05′49″E

Geography
- Location within Alps
- Location: Graubünden, Switzerland; Vorarlberg, Austria
- Parent range: Silvretta Alps

The Signalhorn is a mountain of the Silvretta Alps, located on the border between Switzerland and Austria. It lies just east of the Silvretta Pass and is the tripoint between the regions of Prättigau and Engadin (in the Swiss canton of Graubünden) and Montafon (in the Austrian state of Vorarlberg).
