= Leidhorn =

Mountain in Switzerland

- Location within Switzerland

Highest point
- Elevation: 2,839 m (9,314 ft)
- Prominence: 187 m (614 ft)
- Parent peak: Schildflue
- Coordinates: 46°52′43.5″N 9°59′37.5″E

Geography
- Location: Graubünden, Switzerland
- Parent range: Silvretta Alps

The Leidhorn is a mountain of the Silvretta Alps, located east of Klosters in the canton of Graubünden. The mountain lies between the valleys of Schlappintal and Monbiel. The mountain was formed during the Alpine orogeny through the uplift and deformation of metamorphic rocks, with its present shape subsequently sculpted by glacial erosion.
