= Isentällispitz =

Mountain in Switzerland

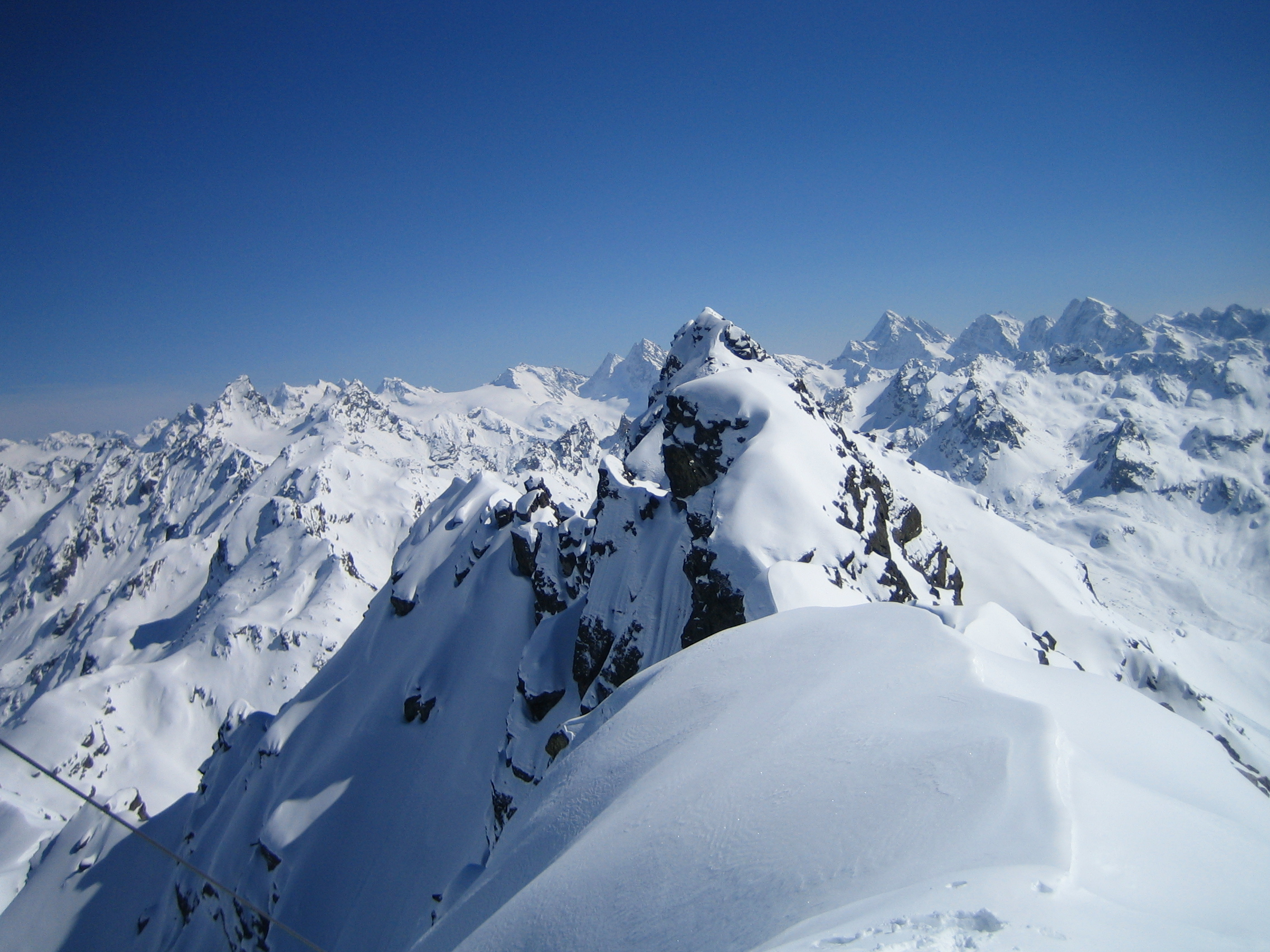
- Isentällispitz from Rothbühelspitze summit

Highest point
- Elevation: 2,873 m (9,426 ft)
- Prominence: 384 m (1,260 ft)
- Parent peak: Piz Linard
- Listing: Alpine mountains 2500-2999 m
- Coordinates: 46°54′48″N 9°57′45″E

Geography
- Location within Alps
- Location: Graubünden, Switzerland; Vorarlberg, Austria
- Parent range: Silvretta Alps

Isentällispitz (2,873 m) is a mountain of the Silvretta Alps, located on the border between Austria and Switzerland. The closest locality is Klosters on the Swiss side.
