= Piz Tasna =

Mountain in Switzerland

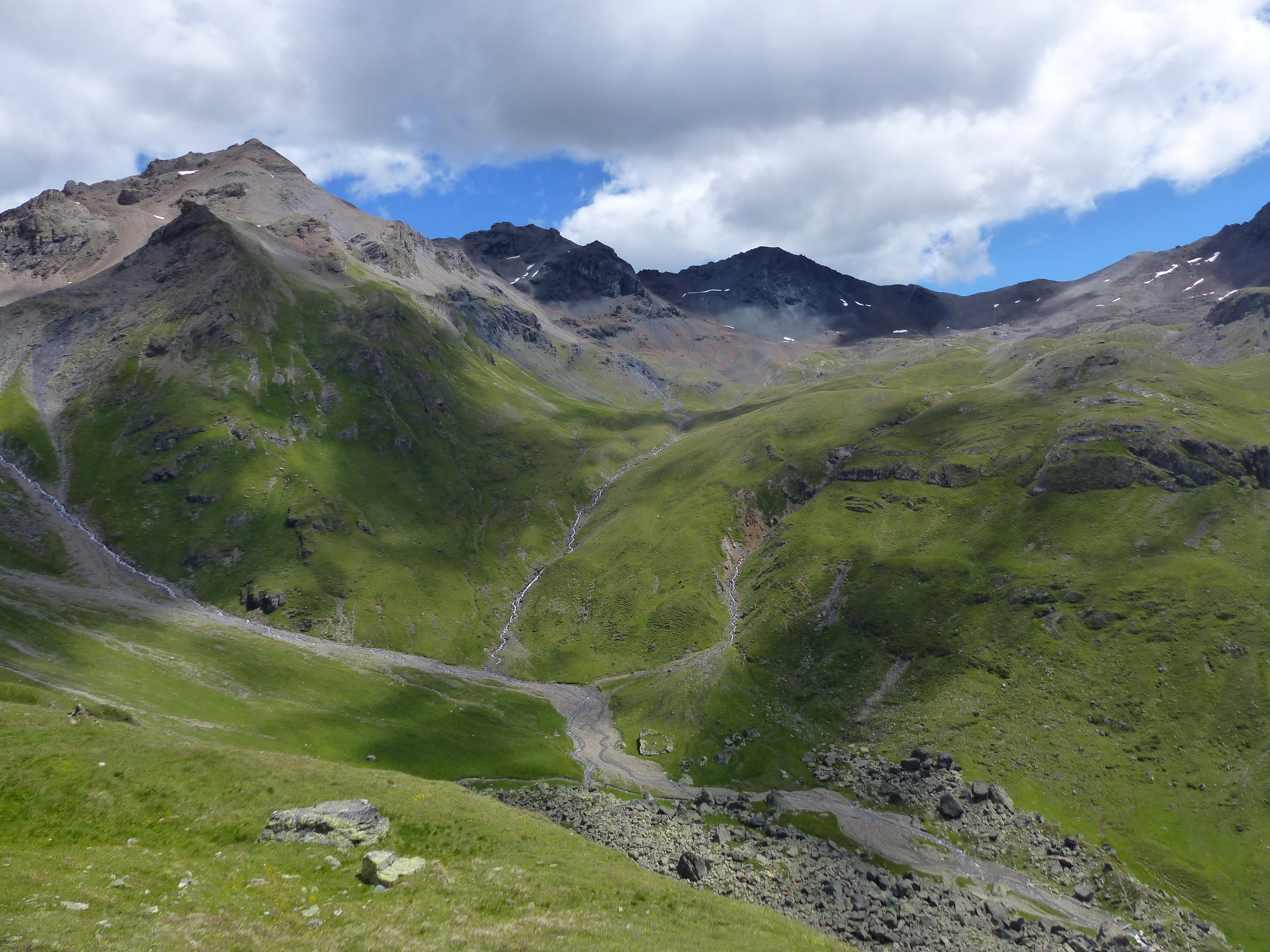
- Piz Tasna (left)

Highest point
- Elevation: 3,179 m (10,430 ft)
- Prominence: 371 m (1,217 ft)
- Parent peak: Fluchthorn
- Listing: Alpine mountains above 3000 m
- Coordinates: 46°51′32.7″N 10°15′8.1″E

Geography
- Location within Switzerland
- Location: Graubünden, Switzerland
- Parent range: Silvretta Alps

Piz Tasna is a mountain of the Silvretta Alps, located between Val Tasna and Val Sinestra in Graubünden, Switzerland. On the north side of the mountain lies a glacier named Vadret da Tasna.
