= Johann Jakob Weilenmann =

Swiss mountaineer and Alpine writer

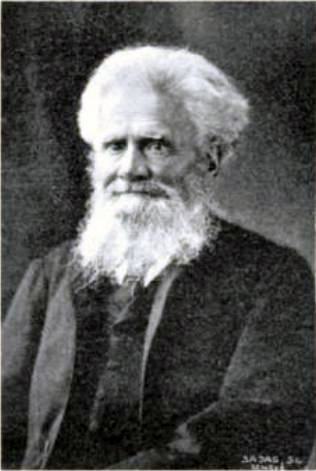
J.J. Weilenmann

Johann Jakob Weilenmann (24 January 1819 in St. Gallen – 8 June 1896 in St. Gallen) was a Swiss mountaineer and Alpine writer.

Weilenmann accomplished many first ascents in the Alps, amongst which are:

- 1859 - Muttler in the Samnaun Alps
- 1861 - Fluchthorn in the Silvretta, with Franz Pöll, a guide from Galtür
- 1862 - Ramolkogel and Weißer Kogel in the Ötztal Alps
- 1863 - Helsenhorn in the Lepontine Alps
- 1865 - Piz Buin in the Silvretta with Joseph Anton Specht and the guides Franz Pöll and Jakob Pfitschner
- 1865 - Crast' Agüzza in the Bernina Range with Specht, Pöll and Pfitschner
- 1865 - Mont Blanc de Cheilon in the Pennine Alps with Justin Felley

== Bibliography ==
- 1859 - Eine Ersteigung des Piz Linard im Unter-Engadin
- 1859 - Berg- und Gletscher-Fahrten in den Hochalpen der Schweiz, with Heinrich Zellen-Horner, Melchior Ulrich and Gottlieb Samuel Studer
- 1859 - Die Ersteigung des Monte Rosa und Monte Generoso, with Melchior Ulrich
- 1866 - Im Adula-Gebirge
- 1866 - Das Gepaatschjoch: aus dem Kauner-Thale über die Gepaatsch- und Vernagt-Ferner nach dem Rofenthale
- 1868 - Die bäder von Bormio : Landschaftsbilder, bergfahrten und naturwissenschaftliche skizzen, with Gottfried Ludwig Theobald
- 1868 - Die Bäder von Bormio und die sie umgebende Gebirgswelt, with Gottfried Theobald, Christian Gregor Brugger and Conrad Meyer-Ahrens
- 1872 - Aus der Firnenwelt, gesammelte Schriften
- ? - Bergabenteuer in Rätikon, Verwall und Silvretta : auf den Höhenwegen vom Rheintal bis zum Engadin mit dem einsamen Bergwanderer des 19. Jahrhunderts, ISBN 3799541004

== Literature ==
- Eduard Scherrer: J.J. Weilenmann. In: Jahrbuch des Schweizer Alpenklub, (32) 1896–1897, 183–202. ISBN 978-0-543-78228-1
