= Verstancla Glacier =

Glacier in Switzerland

Coordinates: 46°50′36″N 10°4′2″E

The Verstancla Glacier (German: Verstanclagletscher) is a 2 km long glacier (2005) situated in the Silvretta Range in the canton of Graubünden in Switzerland. In 1973 it had an area of 1.27 km^{2}. The glacier is located north of the Verstanclahorn. It is parallel to the larger Silvretta Glacier lying a few kilometres north.

The Verstancla Glacier gives birth to the river Verstanclabach which ends in the river Landquart.

== See also ==
- List of glaciers in Switzerland
- Swiss Alps
