= Augstenberg =

Mountain in Switzerland

- Piz Blaisch Lunga
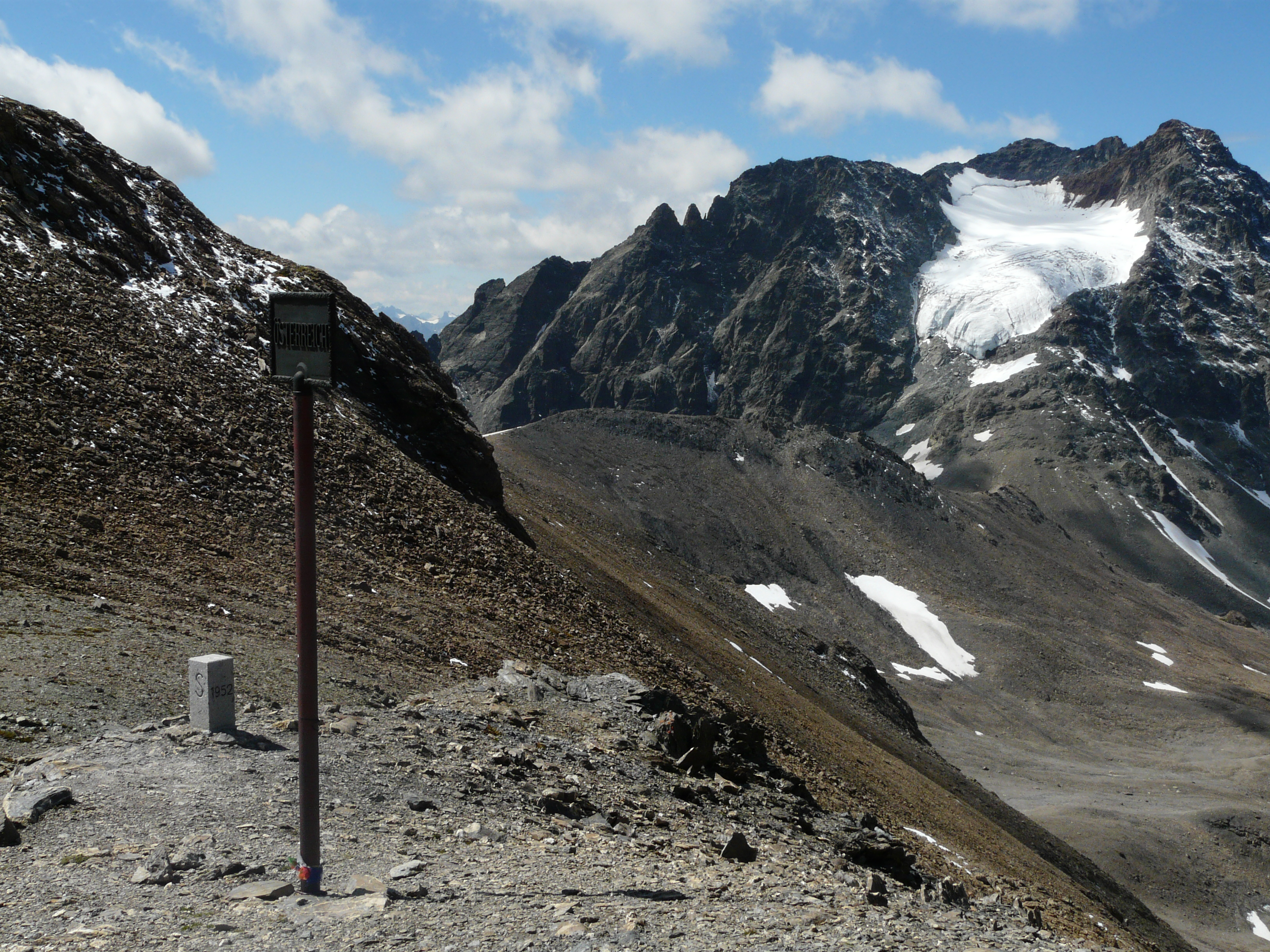
- Augstenberg on the right.

Highest point
- Elevation: 3,230 m (10,600 ft)
- Prominence: 432 m (1,417 ft)
- Parent peak: Piz Buin
- Listing: Alpine mountains above 3000 m
- Coordinates: 46°51′52″N 10°12′13″E

Geography
- Location within Alps
- Location: Graubünden, Switzerland/Tyrol, Austria
- Parent range: Silvretta Alps

Climbing
- First ascent: 23 August 1881 by C. Blezinger and E. Renner, guided by Peter Reinstadler and the brothers Lorenz.

The Augstenberg (also known as Piz Blaisch Lunga) is a mountain in the Silvretta Alps, located on the border between Austria and Switzerland. It has an elevation of 3,230 metres (10,597 ft) above sea level. A secondary summit on the south has an elevation of 3,225 metres. On its eastern side, the Augstenberg overlooks the Pass Futschöl (2,768 m).
