= Plattenhörner =

Mountain in Switzerland

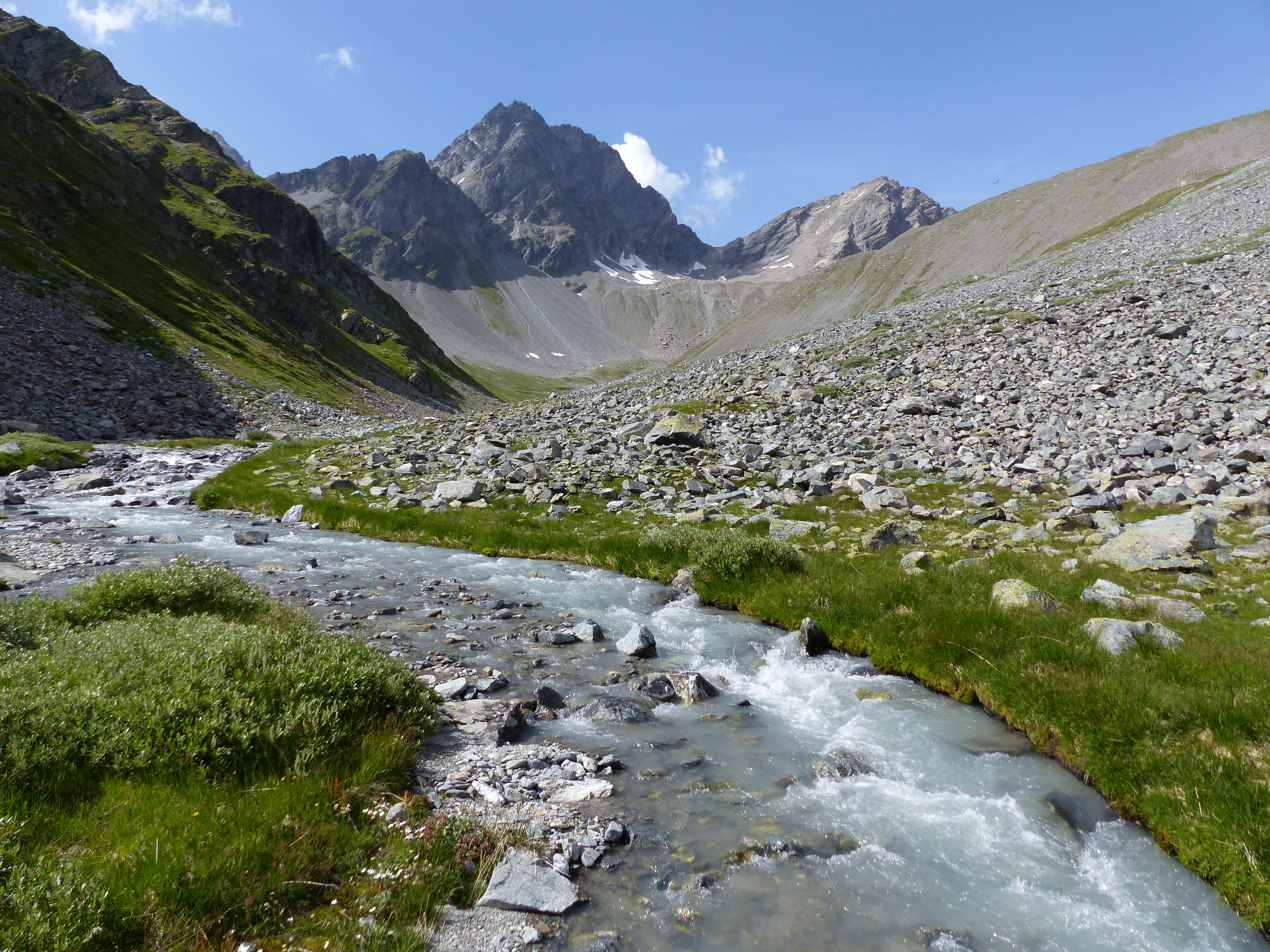
- Plattenhörner

Highest point
- Elevation: 3,220 m (10,560 ft)
- Prominence: 300 m (980 ft)
- Parent peak: Piz Linard
- Listing: Alpine mountains above 3000 m
- Coordinates: 46°48′39.7″N 10°1′51.6″E

Geography
- Location within Switzerland
- Location: Graubünden, Switzerland
- Parent range: Silvretta Alps

The Plattenhörner is a 3220 meter-high multi-summited mountain in the Swiss Silvretta Alps, overlooking the Vereina Pass in the Swiss canton of Graubünden. The main summit has an elevation of 3,220 metres above sea level and is located three kilometres west of Piz Linard.

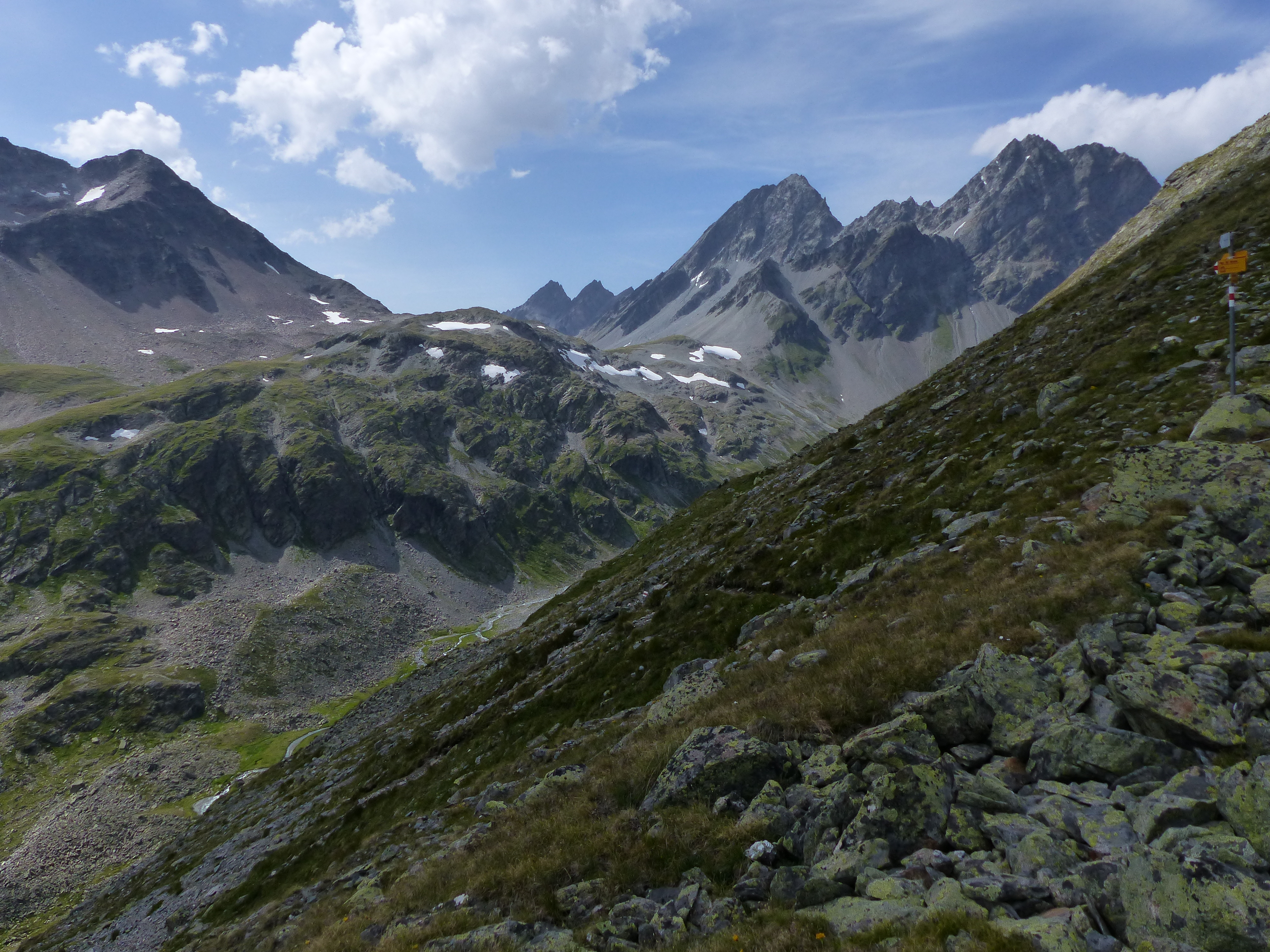
Plattenhörner from SE, above Vereina Pass
