= Silvretta-Hochalpenstraße =

Road in Tyrol, Austria

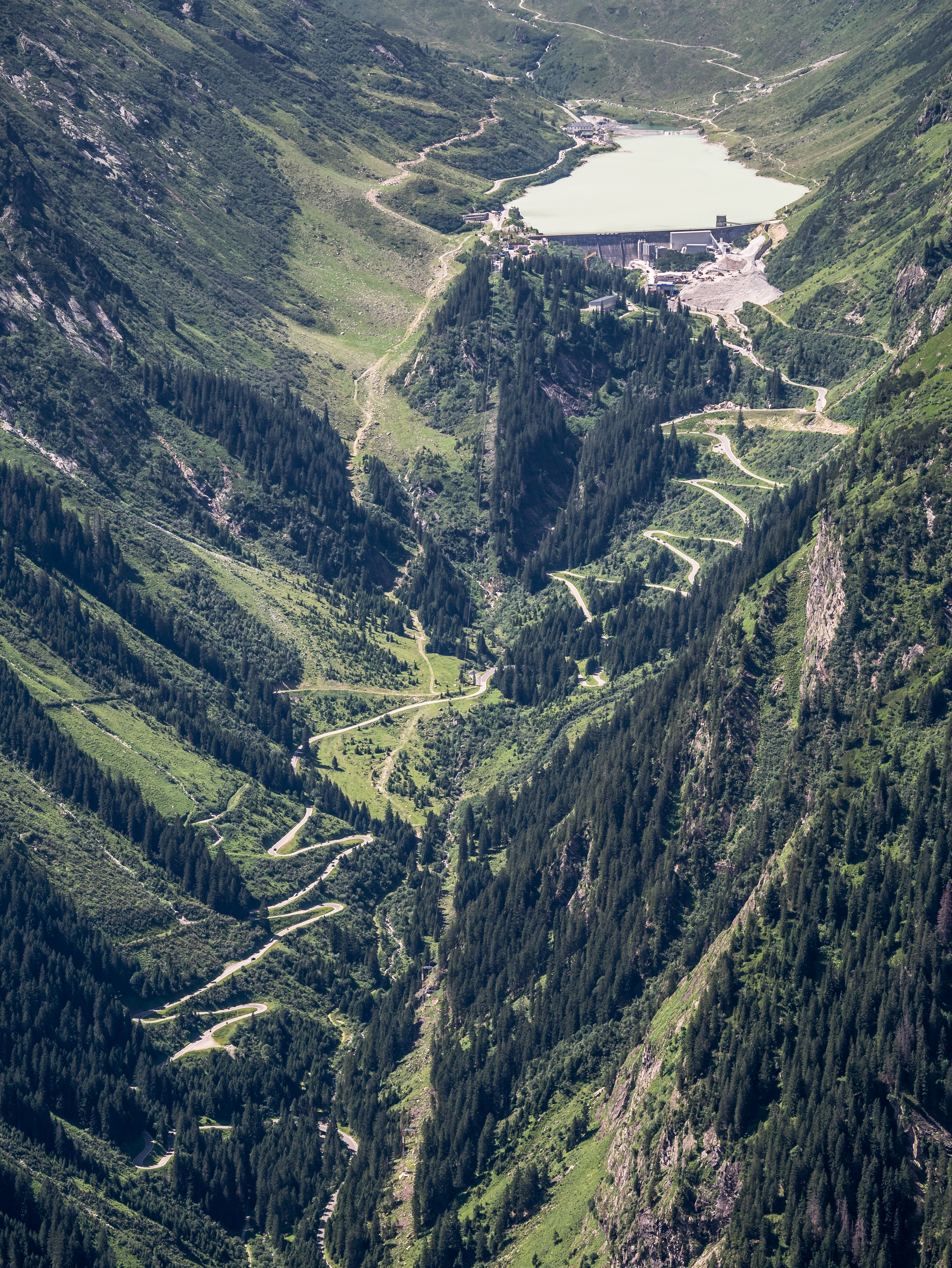
View of the highest point (2,032 m) featuring the Silvretta Reservoir

Silvretta-Hochalpenstraße is a private toll road leading to the Bielerhöhe Pass between Vorarlberg and Tirol. The road is owned and operated by Vorarlberger Illwerke.

The length is 22.3 kilometres (13.9 mi). The road was opened to the public in 1954.

Toll booths (entry/exit):

- Partenen at 1,051 metres (3,448 ft) above sea level
- Galtür at 1,725 metres (5,659 ft) above sea level

== See also ==
- List of toll roads#Austria
- List of mountain passes
