= Verstanclahorn =

Mountain in Switzerland

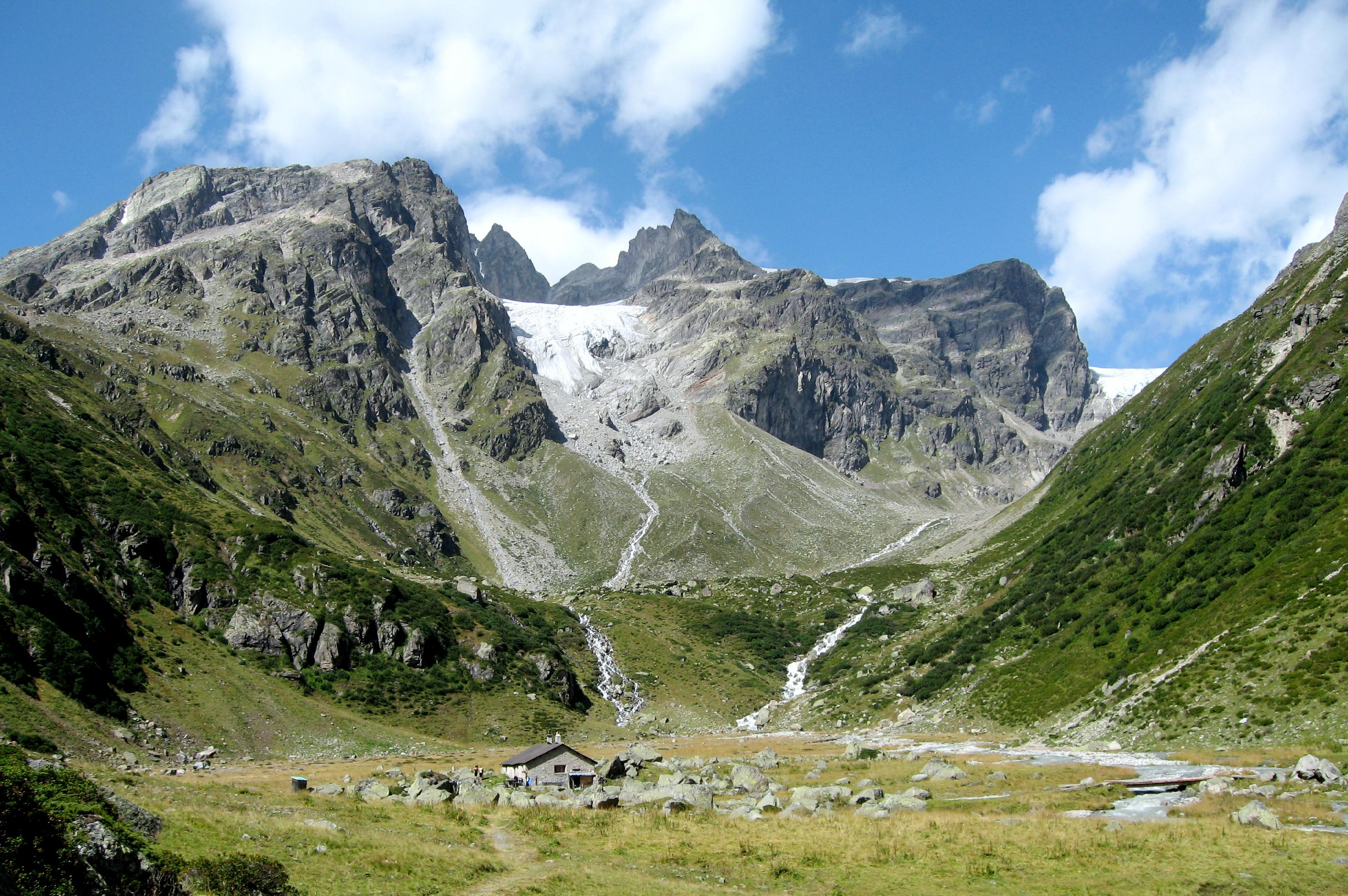
- View from Val Lavinuoz, the southern glacier is visible just under the summit

Highest point
- Elevation: 3,298 m (10,820 ft)
- Prominence: 375 m (1,230 ft)
- Parent peak: Piz Buin
- Listing: Alpine mountains above 3000 m
- Coordinates: 46°50′6.2″N 10°4′20.9″E

Geography
- Location within Switzerland
- Location: Graubünden, Switzerland
- Parent range: Silvretta Alps

The Verstanclahorn is a mountain of the Swiss Silvretta Alps, located between Piz Buin and Piz Linard in the canton of Graubünden. The mountain has a pyramidal shape with the northern face lying above the Verstancla Glacier. The smaller glacier Vadret da las Maisas lies on the south side.

The mountain is located on the ridge between the central Graubünden (north) and the Engadine valley (south), also separating the basins of the Rhine and Inn River.

The closest locality is Lavin, on the southern side.
