= Vallüla =

Mountain in western Austria

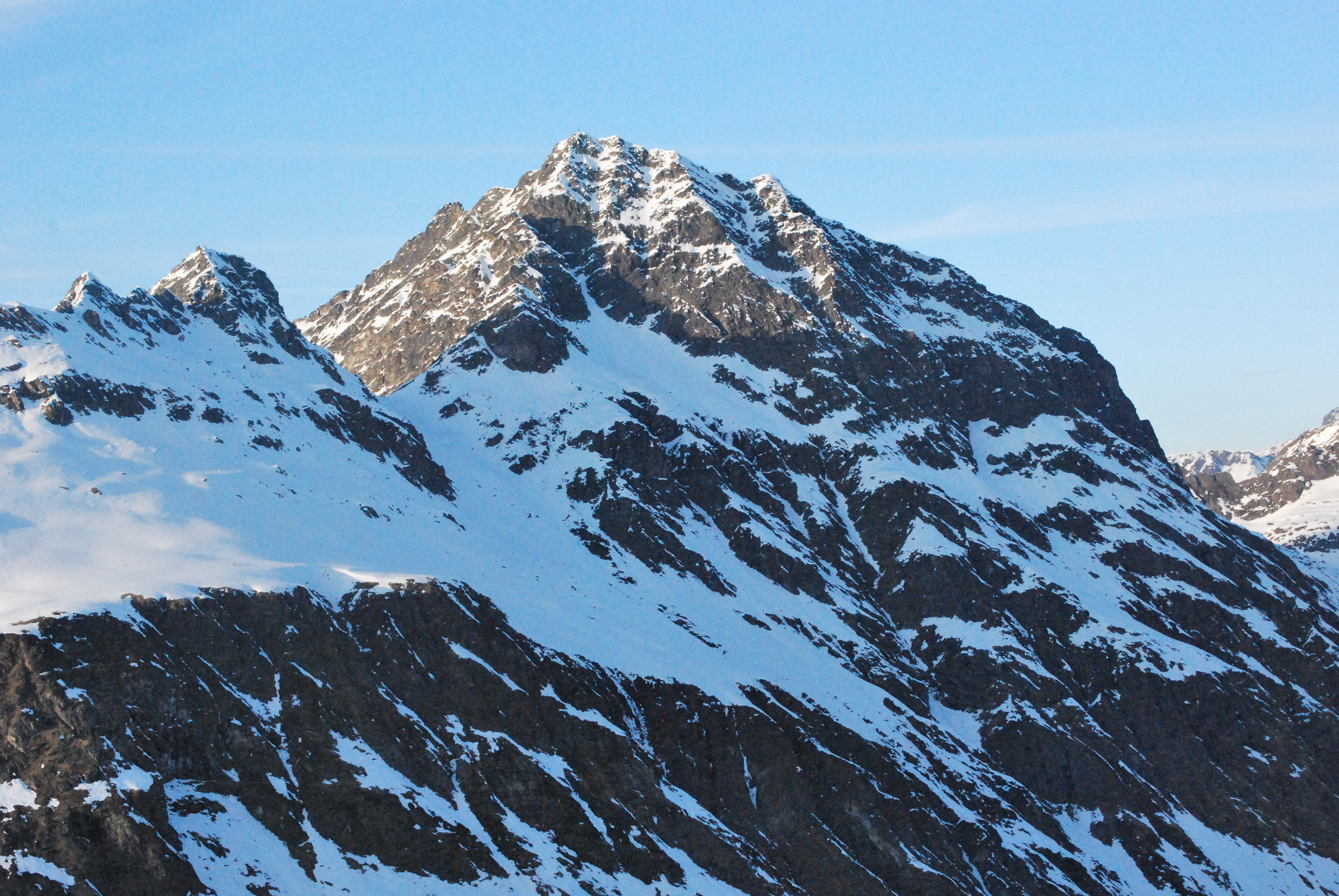
- Vallüla

Highest point
- Elevation: 2,813 m (9,229 ft)
- Prominence: 775 m (2,543 ft)
- Coordinates: 46°56′N 10°07′E

Geography
- Location within Alps
- Location: Tyrol and Vorarlberg, Austria
- Parent range: Silvretta Alps

Vallüla (2,813 m) is a mountain of the Silvretta Alps on the border between Tyrol and Vorarlberg, Austria. It is located above the Bielerhöhe pass, from where most climbs start from.

== In popular culture ==
In W.G. Sebald's 1995 book The Rings of Saturn, he describes the Vallüla massif in lucid detail as it appeared to him in a dream. Sebald had previously seen the mountain as a child while on a visit to the Montafon and felt that his subconscious had retrieved the accurate description from his memory decades later.

== See also ==
- Vallülasee
