= Dreiländerspitze =

Mountain in Switzerland

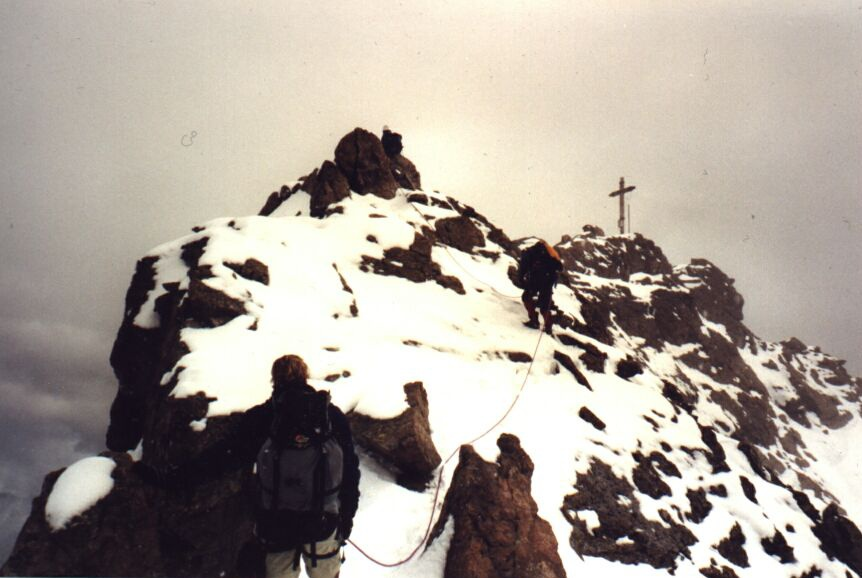
- Approaching the summit in October

Highest point
- Elevation: 3,197 m (10,489 ft)
- Prominence: 306 m (1,004 ft)
- Parent peak: Augstenberg
- Listing: Alpine mountains above 3000 m
- Coordinates: 46°51′04″N 10°08′41.2″E

Geography
- Location within Alps
- Location: Austria-Switzerland
- Parent range: Silvretta Alps

Climbing
- First ascent: 1870, Th. Petersen, O. Morell, D. Barbeuda
- Easiest route: rock/ice climb

The Dreiländerspitze is with 3,197 m (10,489 ft) one of the higher mountains in the Silvretta range in the eastern Alps and located on the Austria–Switzerland border. The borders of the Swiss canton of Graubünden and the Austrian states of Vorarlberg and Tyrol meet at the peak. Its name (Dreiländerspitze means peak of three countries) refers to a meeting point between the territories of three ancient tribes (Rhaeto-Romance or Romansch, Bavarii and Alamanni) and their languages. It is also on the watershed between the Rhine and Danube.

It is a favourite viewpoint, due to its position and accessibility. Its first documented ascent was by the German alpinist Theodor Petersen, accompanied by two locals, on 14 July 1870, although it appeared to have been previously climbed by surveyors in the 1850s. The nearest settlements are Galtür, 14 km (8.7 mi) to the north, and Guarda, 9 km (5.6 mi) to the south.
