= Silvrettahorn =

Mountain in Switzerland

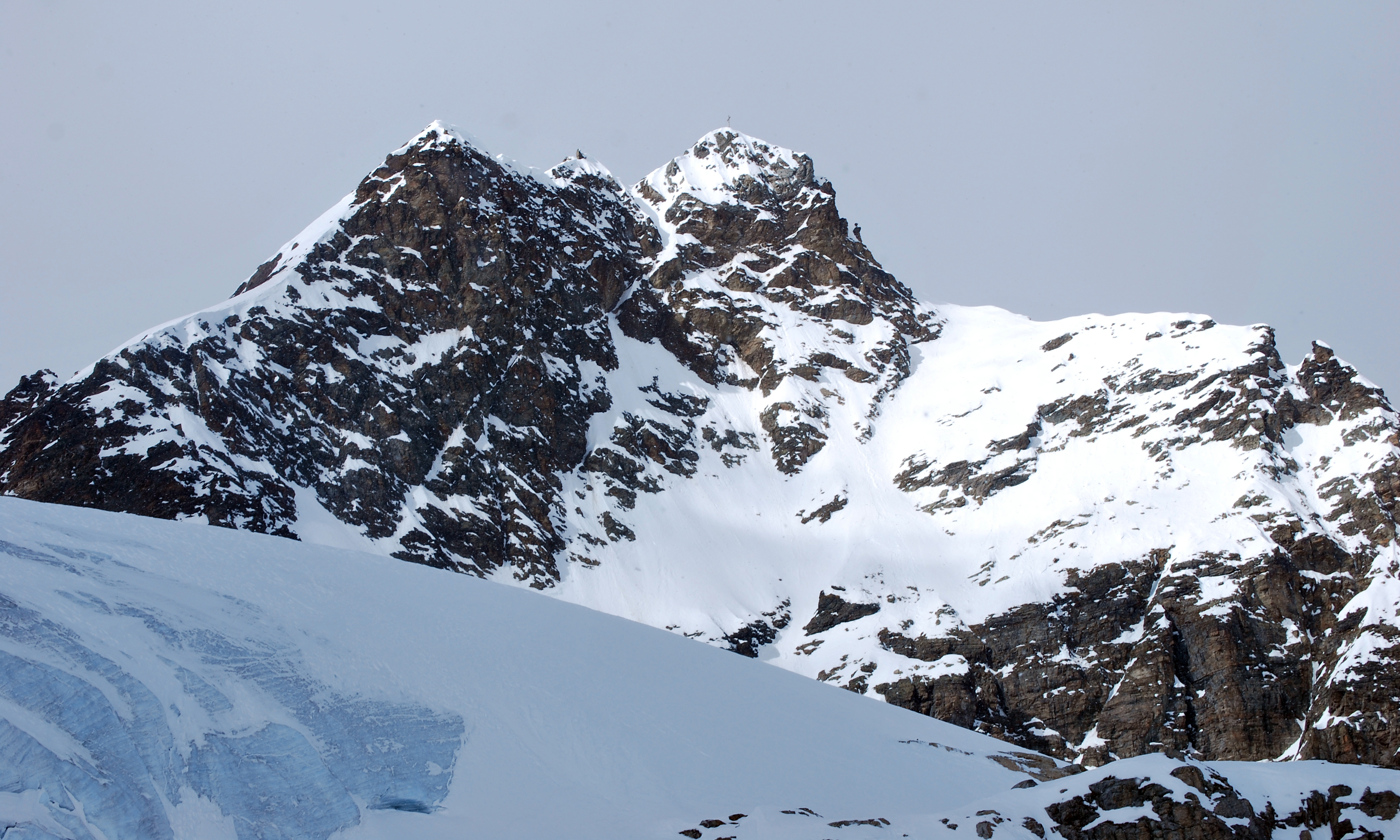
- View from the south-east

Highest point
- Elevation: 3,244 m (10,643 ft)
- Prominence: 201 m (659 ft)
- Parent peak: Piz Buin Pitschen
- Isolation: 2.3 kilometres (1.4 mi)
- Coordinates: 46°51′25″N 10°05′35″E

Geography
- Location within Alps Location within Austria Location within Switzerland
- Location: Vorarlberg, Austria; Graubünden, Switzerland
- Parent range: Silvretta Alps

Climbing
- First ascent: 22 August 1865 by Jules Jacot, guided by Christian Jegen and A. Schlegel

The Silvrettahorn is a mountain of the Silvretta Alps, located on the border between Switzerland and Austria. On its southern Swiss side it overlooks the Silvretta Glacier.
