= Weißer Kogel =

Mountain in Austria

- Location within Austria

Highest point
- Elevation: 3,409 m (11,184 ft)
- Prominence: 197 m (646 ft)
- Parent peak: Wildspitze
- Coordinates: 46°53′30″N 10°54′23″E

Geography
- Location: Tyrol, Austria
- Parent range: Ötztal Alps

Climbing
- First ascent: 1862 by Johann Jakob Weilenmann
- Easiest route: West ridge

The Weißer Kogel is a mountain in the Weisskamm group of the Ötztal Alps.
