= Hochmaderer =

Mountain in Vorarlberg, Austria

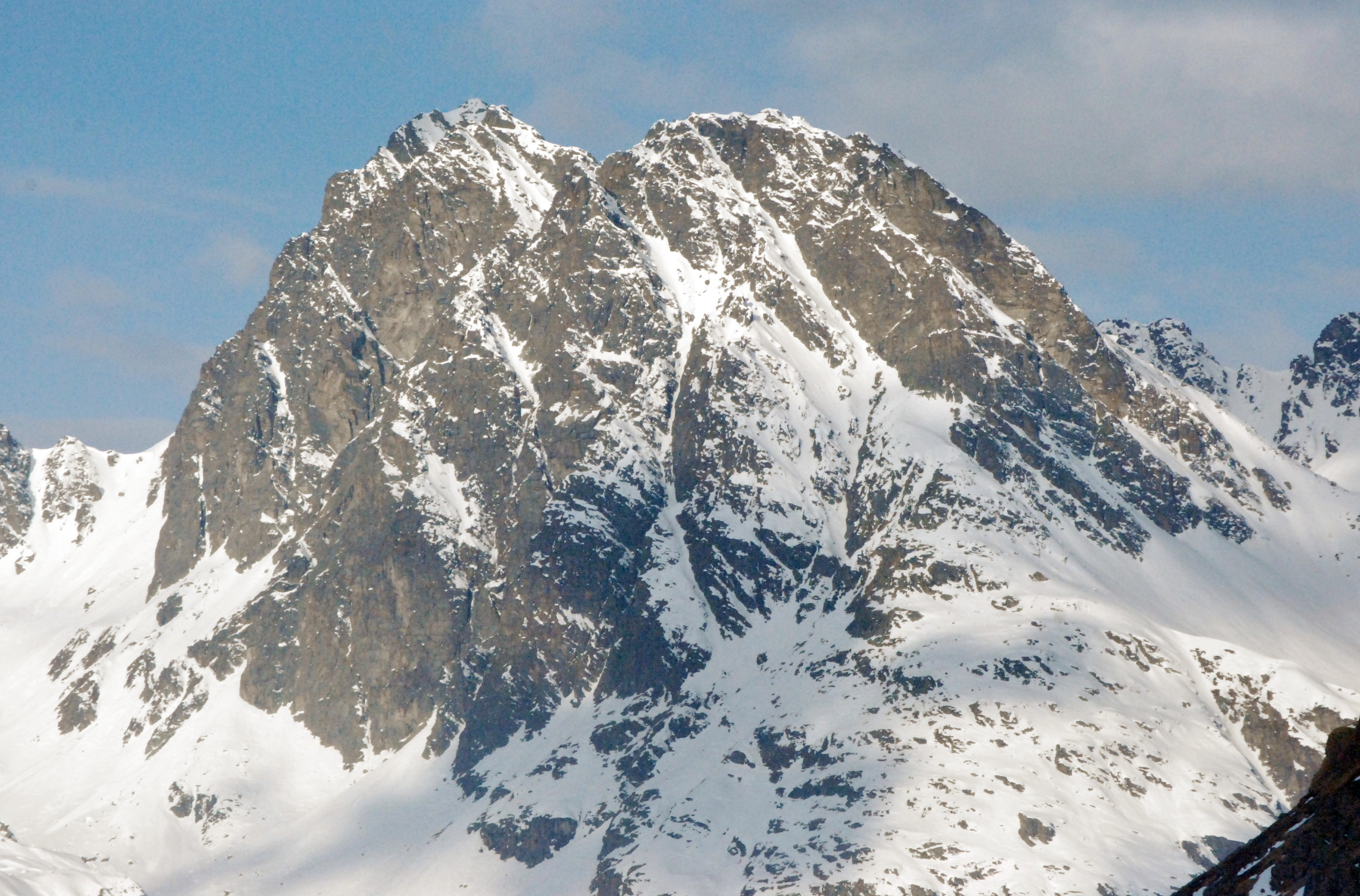
- The Hochmaderer from Bielerhöhe to the east

Highest point
- Elevation: 2,823 m (AA) (9,262 ft)
- Prominence: 318 m ↓ Hochmadererjoch
- Isolation: 2.7 km → Zwillinge
- Coordinates: 46°55′51″N 10°01′41″E

Geography
- Location within Austria
- Location: Vorarlberg, Austria
- Parent range: Silvretta

The Hochmaderer is a prominent mountain, 2,823 metres high, in the Silvretta in the Austrian state of Vorarlberg, at the end of the Montafon valley. The multi-peaked block of primitive rock drops in mighty precipices to the south and east.

The mountain may be ascended from the lake of Vermuntsee (1,743 m / 3½ hours) or from the Tübinger Hut (2,190 m / 2¾ hours) up the little valley of Gantschettatäli (2,300 m) to the south and the Hochmadererjoch saddle (2,505 m / 1 hour).

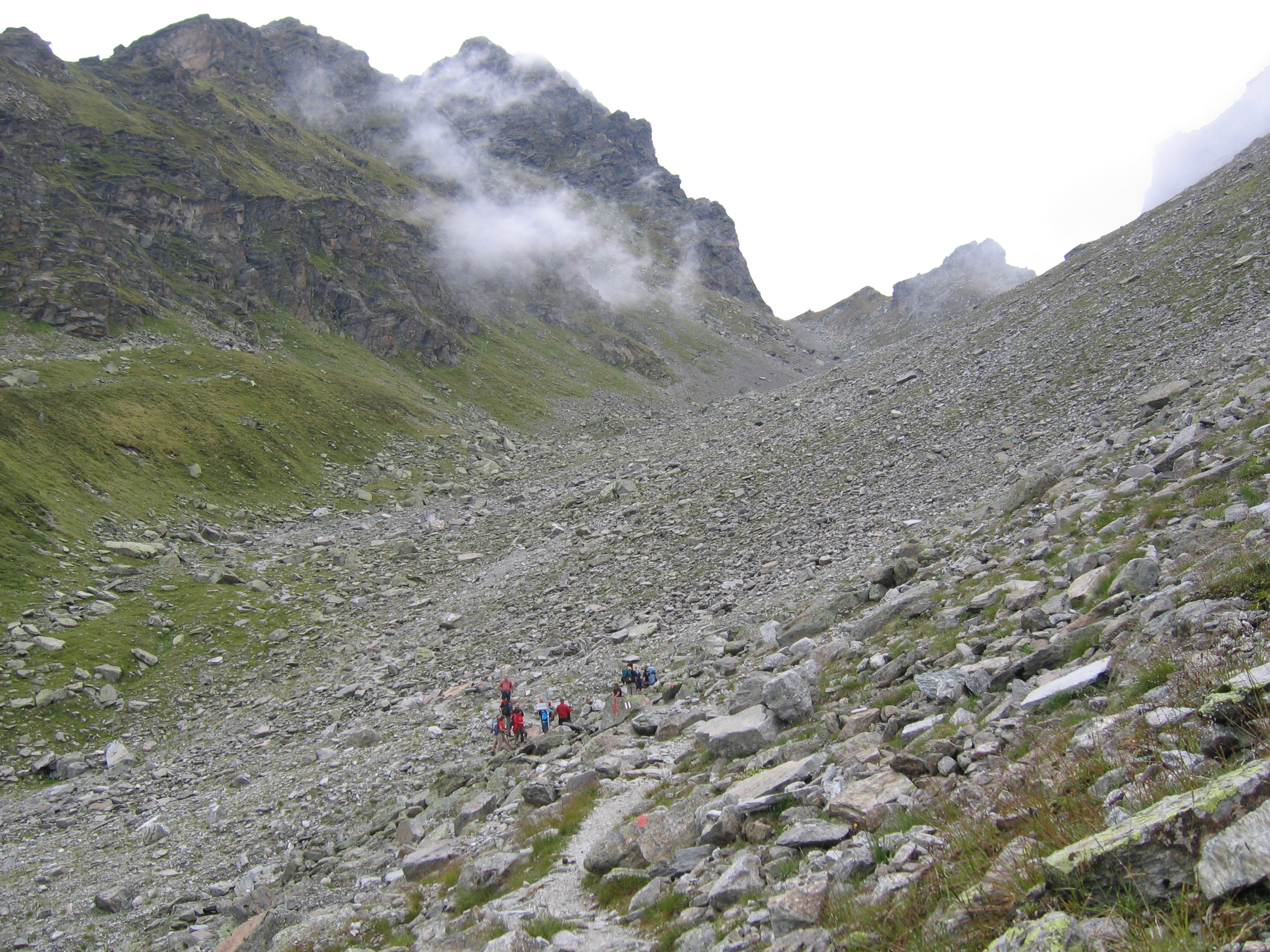
View from the west over the Gantschettatäli valley and Hochmadererjoch saddle to the Hochmaderer (left)
