= Piz Fliana =

Mountain in Switzerland

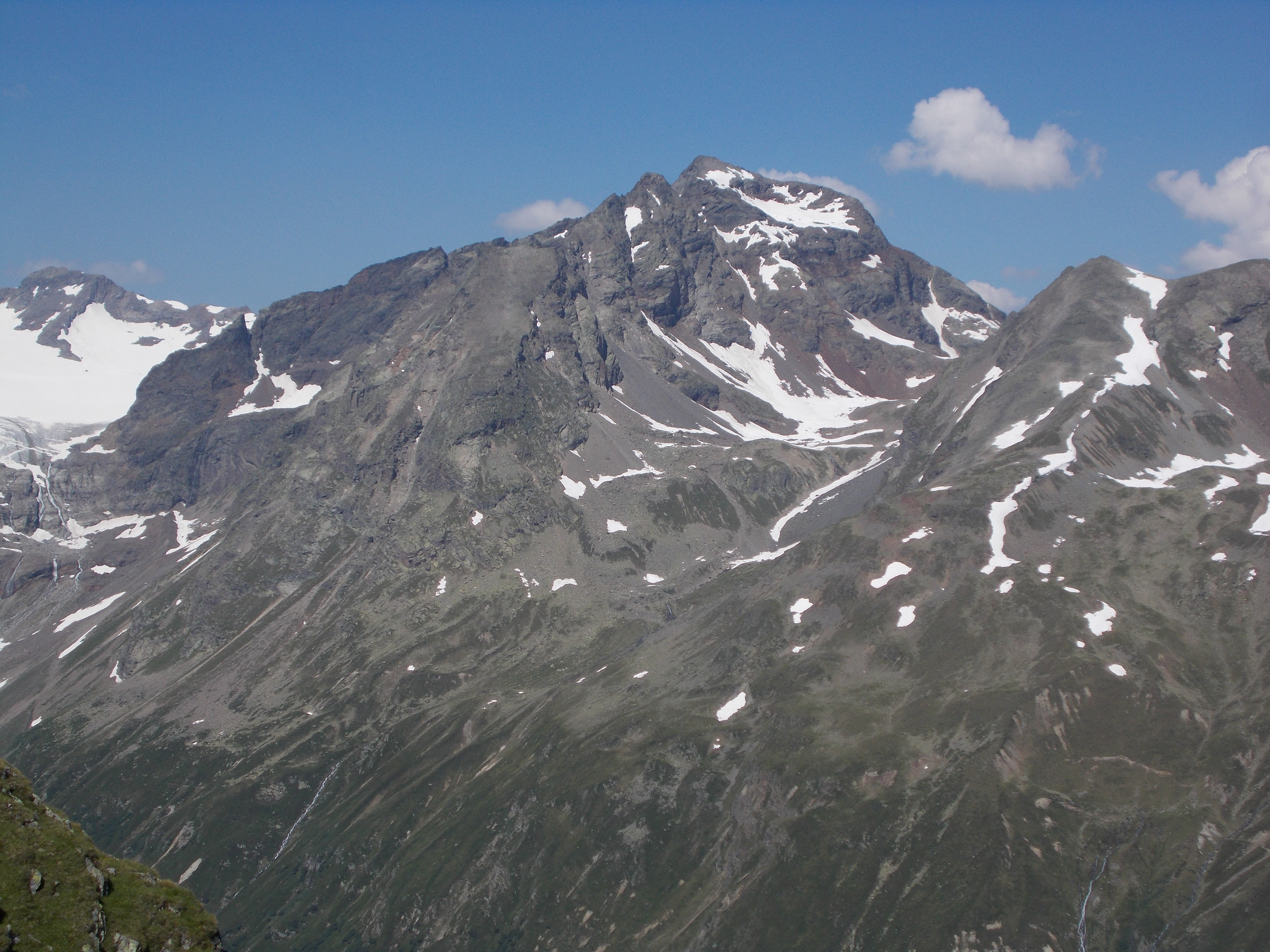
- Piz Fliana from the Southwest

Highest point
- Elevation: 3,281 m (10,764 ft)
- Prominence: 428 m (1,404 ft)
- Parent peak: Piz Buin
- Listing: Alpine mountains above 3000 m
- Coordinates: 46°49′37.5″N 10°06′32″E

Geography
- Location within Switzerland
- Location: Graubünden, Switzerland
- Parent range: Silvretta Alps

Piz Fliana is a mountain of the Silvretta Alps, located south of Piz Buin in the Swiss canton of Graubünden.
