= Silvretta Reservoir =

Reservoir in Austria

- Silvretta-Stausee (German)
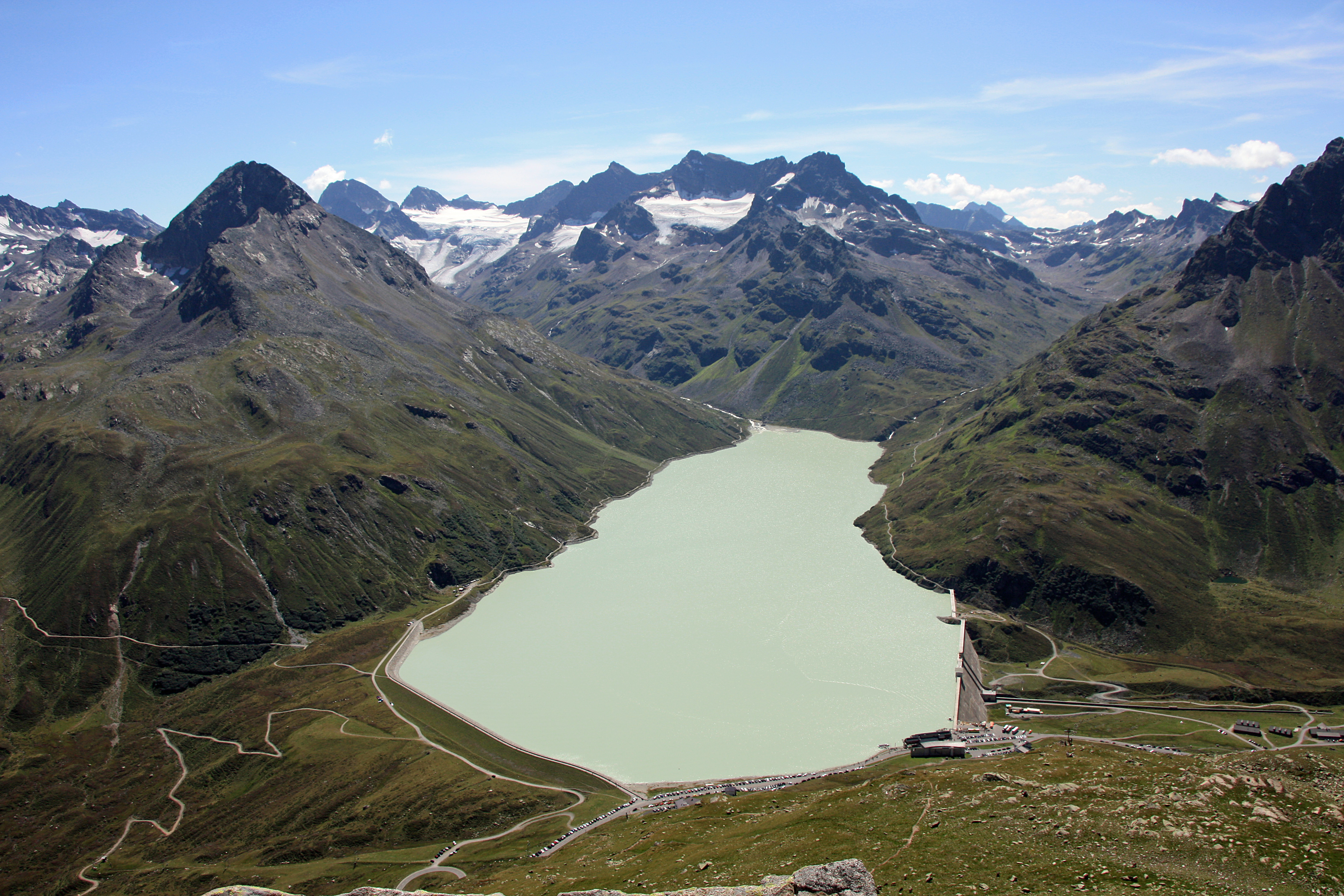
- The Silvretta Reservoir, 2009

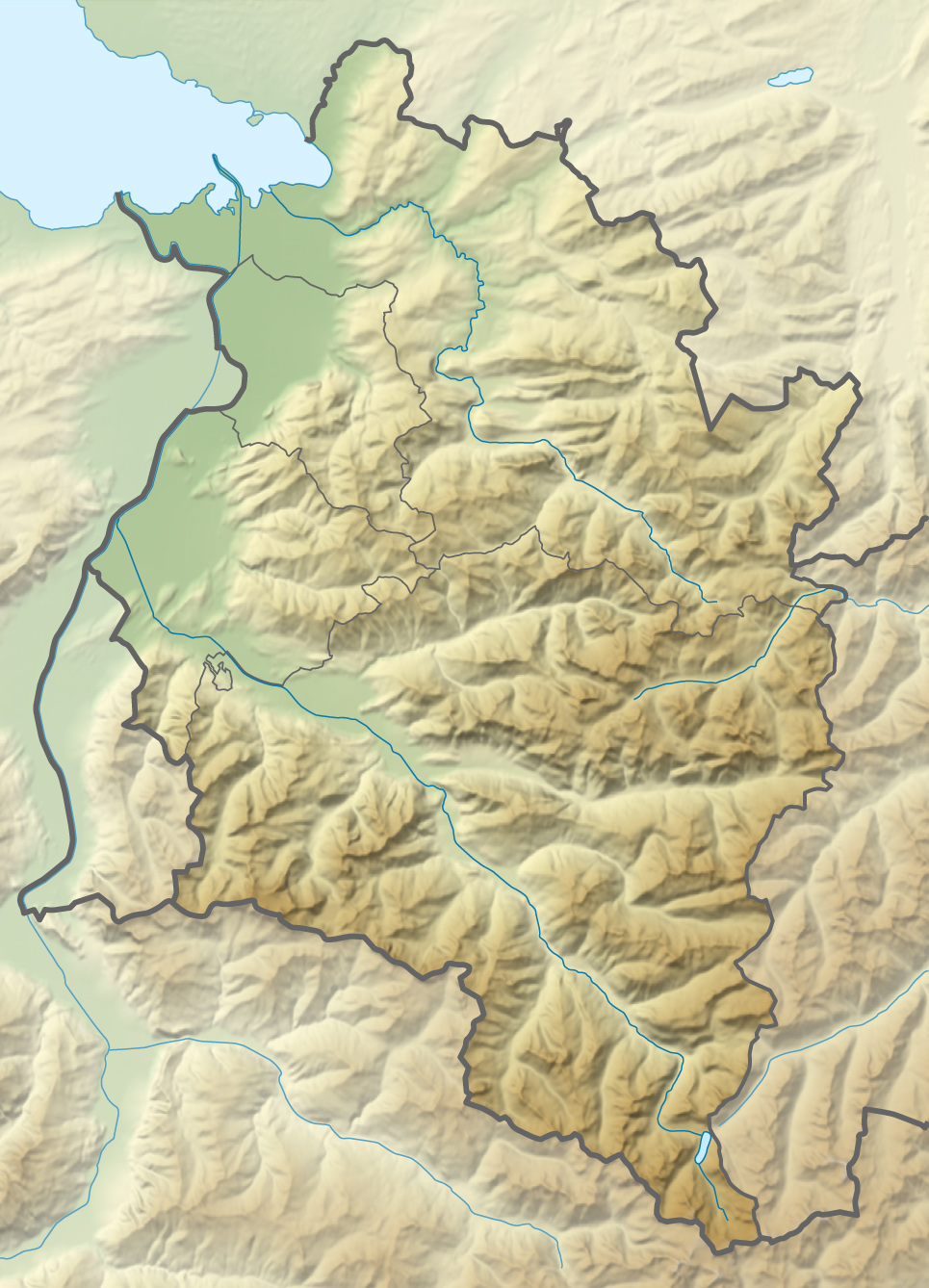
- Location within Vorarlberg Location within Austria
- Interactive map of Silvretta Reservoir
- Location: Silvretta Alps; Vorarlberg, Austria
- Coordinates: 46.9075°N 10.093056°E
- Type: Reservoir
- Basin countries: Austria
- Surface area: 1.3 km^{2} (0.50 sq mi)
- Max. depth: 80 metres (260 ft)
- Water volume: 38.6 million cubic metres (1.02×10^{10} US gal)
- Surface elevation: 2,000 m (6,600 ft)

The Silvretta Reservoir is a reservoir in the Silvretta Alps in the province of Vorarlberg, Austria. It is located approximately 2,000 metres (6,600 ft) above sea level and covers an area of 1.3 square kilometres (0.50 sq mi). Along with the Vermunt Reservoir, it is responsible for feeding the Obervermuntwerk II pumped-storage power plant.
