= Fluchthorn =

Mountain in Switzerland

- Piz Fenga
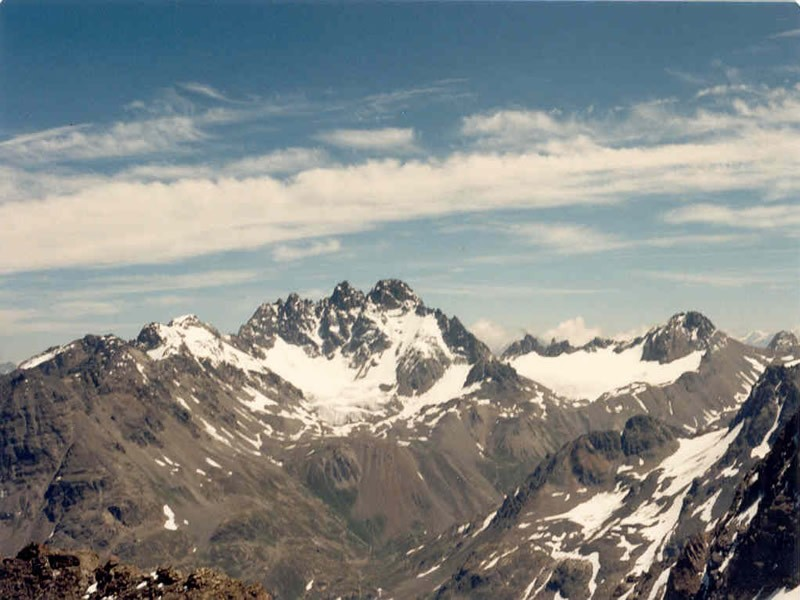
- Fluchthorn from the West, July 1987

Highest point
- Elevation: 3,397 m (11,145 ft)
- Prominence: 645 m (2,116 ft)
- Parent peak: Piz Linard
- Isolation: 15.5 km (9.6 mi)
- Listing: Alpine mountains above 3000 m
- Coordinates: 46°53′27.2″N 10°13′38.7″E

Geography
- Location within Alps
- Location: Tyrol, Austria; Graubünden, Switzerland
- Parent range: Silvretta Alps

Climbing
- First ascent: 1862 by Johann Jakob Weilenmann and Franz Pöll
- Easiest route: Scramble

The Fluchthorn or Piz Fenga is a mountain in the Silvretta Alps, located on the border between Austria and Switzerland. With a height of 3,397 metres (11,145 ft) above Adriatic Sea level, it is the second highest summit of the Silvretta Alps. The Fluchthorn lies between the Jamtal (Tyrol) and the Val Fenga (Graubünden). It consists of three summits of which the southern one was the highest.

The 3,399 metres (11,152 ft) southern summit (including the summit cross) collapsed in a massive landslide which occurred on 11 June 2023 around 15:30 CEST. The main peak (south peak) lost 62 feet (19 m). It fell in the western area of the peak, in the Futschöl Valley. The landslide was attributed to permafrost melt due to global warming.

The middle peak (3,397 m) is now the highest point of the Fluchthorn and the second highest mountain of the Silvretta.

== See also ==
- List of most isolated mountains of Switzerland
- List of mountains of Graubünden
