= Silvretta Alps =

Mountain range on the Austro-Swiss border

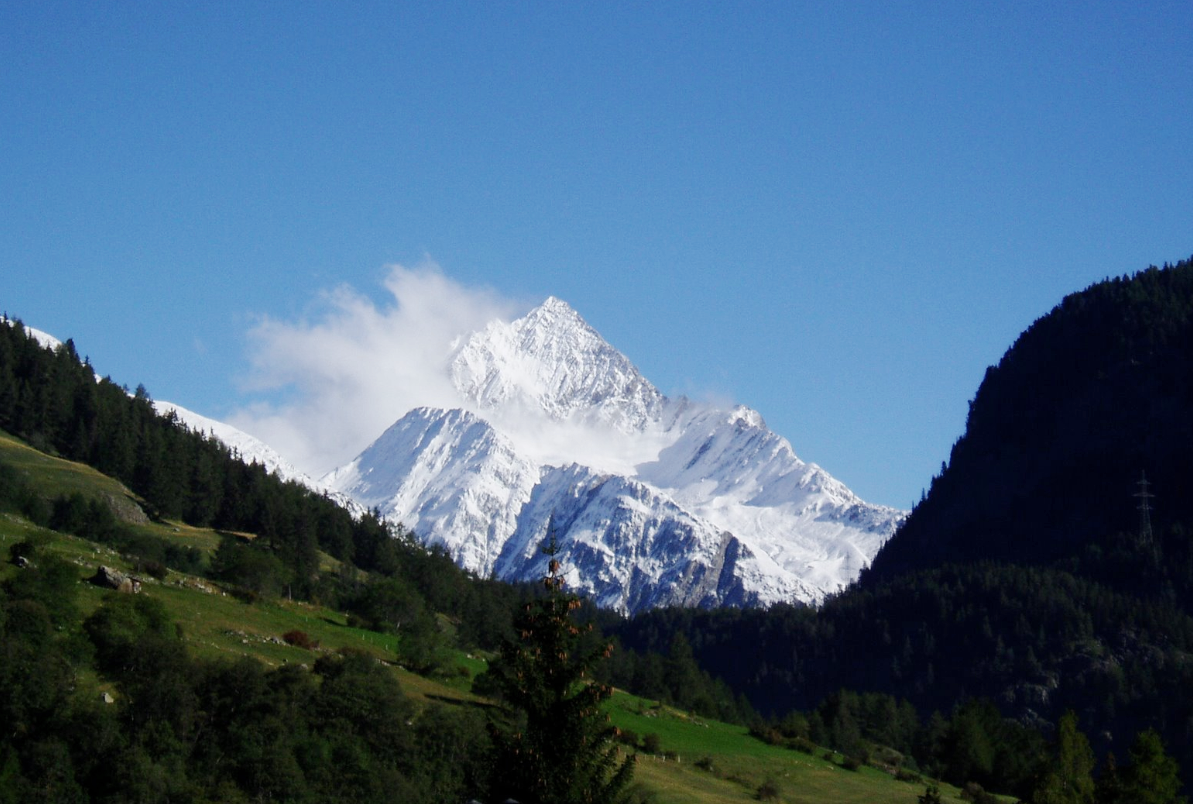
- Piz Linard

Highest point
- Peak: Piz Linard
- Elevation: 3,410 m (11,190 ft)
- Coordinates: 46°50′N 10°02′E

Geography
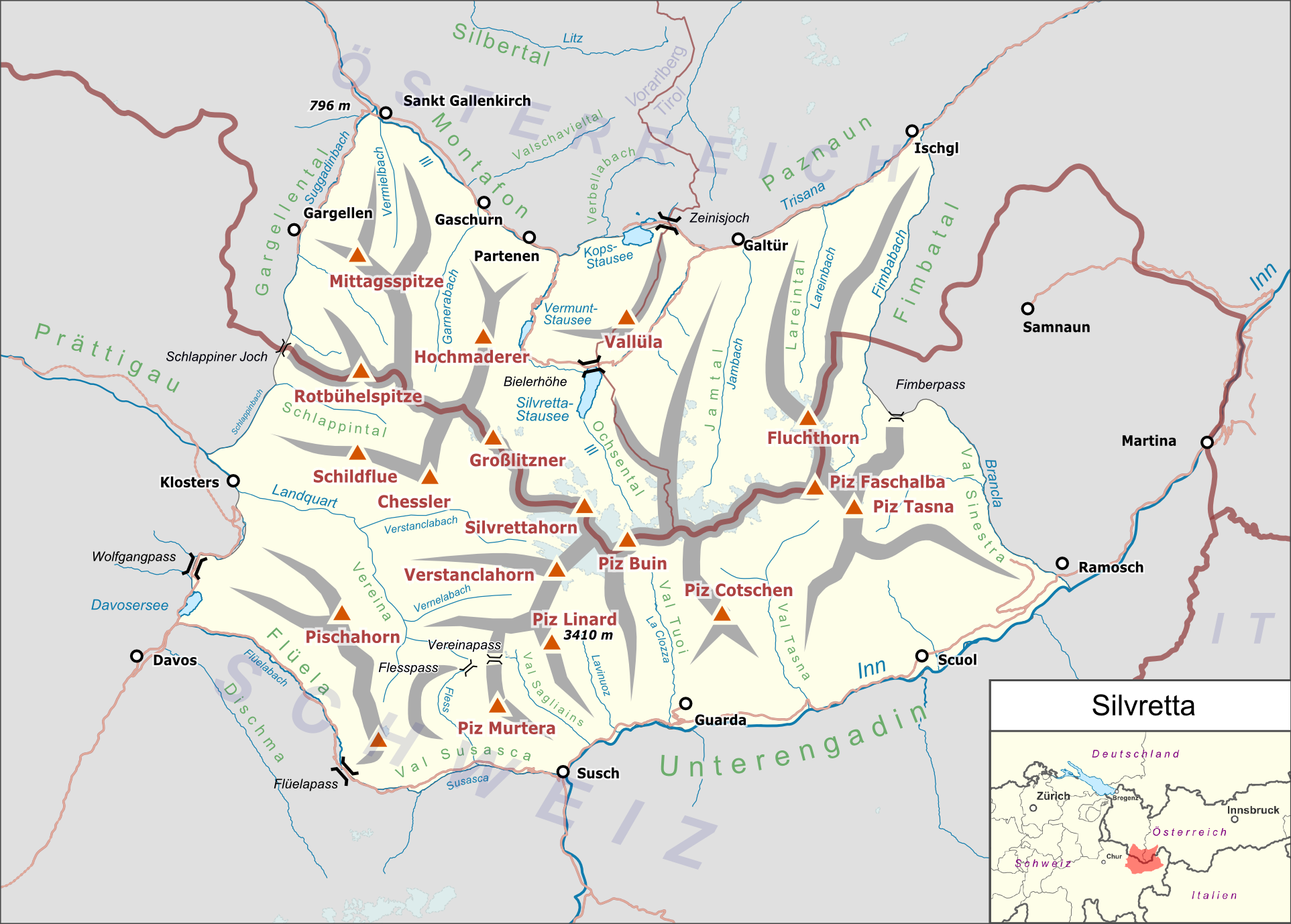
- Silvretta Alps; The borders of the range according to Alpine Club classification of the Eastern Alps
- Countries: Austria; Switzerland
- States: Tirol; Vorarlberg; Graubünden
- Range coordinates: 46°52′N 10°07′E
- Parent range: Central Eastern Alps
- Borders on: Rätikon; Verwall Alps; Samnaun Alps; Sesvenna Range; Albula Range

The Silvretta Alps are a mountain range of the Central Eastern Alps shared by Tirol, Vorarlberg (both in Austria) and Graubünden (Switzerland). The Austrian states of Tirol and Vorarlberg are connected by a pass road (Silvretta Hochalpenstraße at 2032 m). The majority of the peaks are elevated above three thousand metres and are surrounded by glaciers. Thus, the area is also known as the "Blue Silvretta".

== Borders ==
According to the Alpine Clubs, the Silvretta Alps are outlined from other groups by the following borders: St. Gallenkirch - Ill river as far as Partenen - Zeinisjoch - Zeinisbach - Paznauntal as far as Ischgl - Fimbertal - Fimber Pass - Val Chöglias - Val Sinestra - Inn River from the mouth of the Branclabach to the mouth of the Susasca - Val Susasca - Flüela Pass - Davos - Wolfgang - Laretbach - Klosters - Schlappinbach - Schlappiner Joch - Valzifensbach - Gargellental - St. Gallenkirch.

The Silvretta Alps are surrounded by the Rätikon, Verwall, Samnaun, Sesvenna, Albula and Plessur ranges.

The Piz Buin is not the highest, but the most popular peak of the range. It can relatively easily be ascended from north or south through glaciers and stretches of easy climbing.

The Silvretta is famous for its skiing especially its many backcountry skiing possibilities. In the 1920s Ernest Hemingway was staying in the region for a winter (he lived at Schruns in Montafon, Austria). Later, he wrote a couple of short stories about his skiing experiences in the Silvretta. Some of these short stories are to be found in A moveable feast.

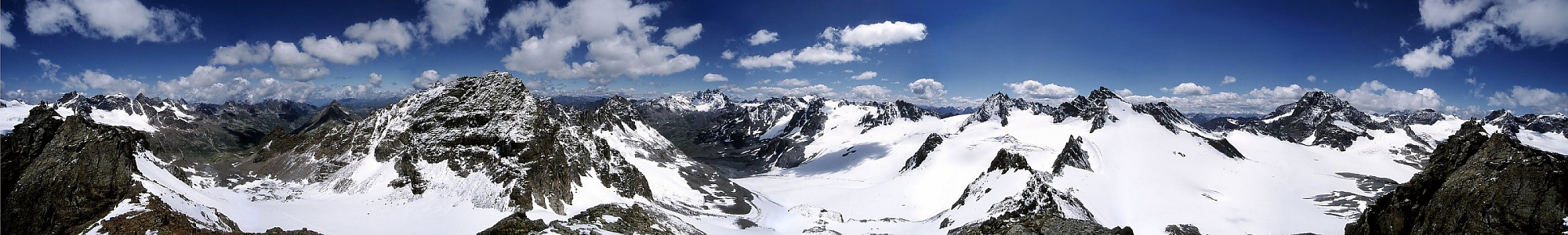
Silvretta - 360° panoramic view

== Adjacent valleys ==
- Montafon
- Paznaun
- Engadin

== Peaks ==
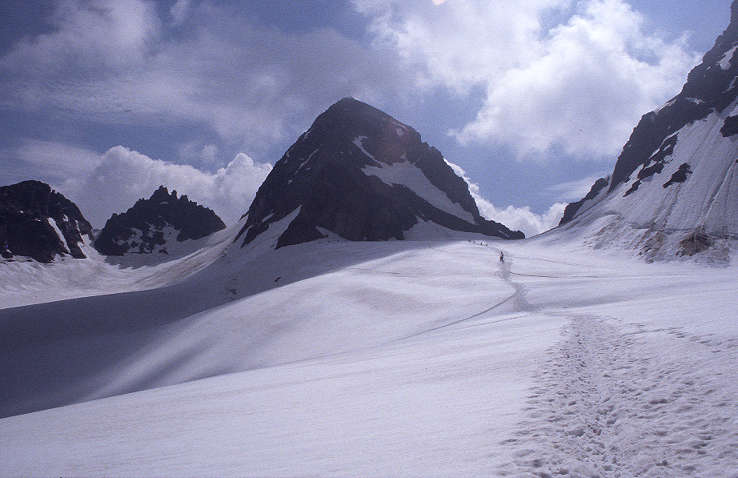
Piz Buin

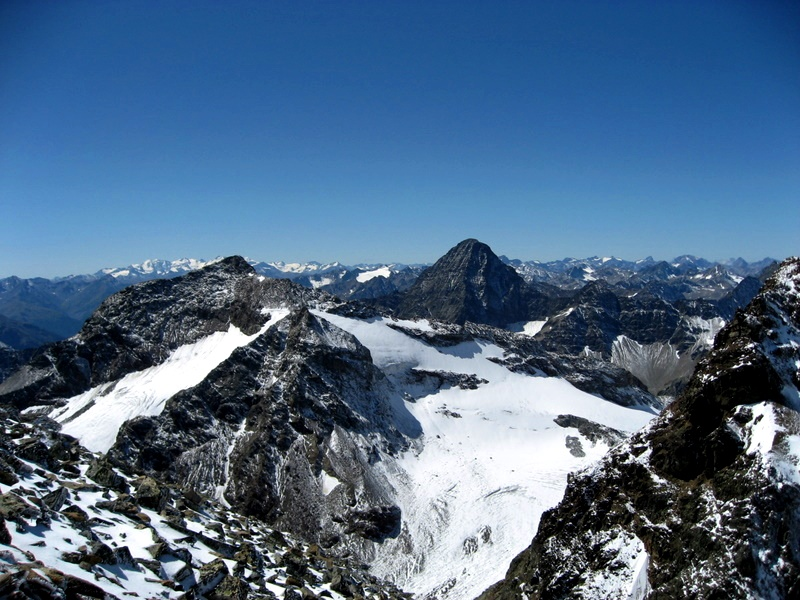
Piz Fliana and Piz Linard from Piz Buin

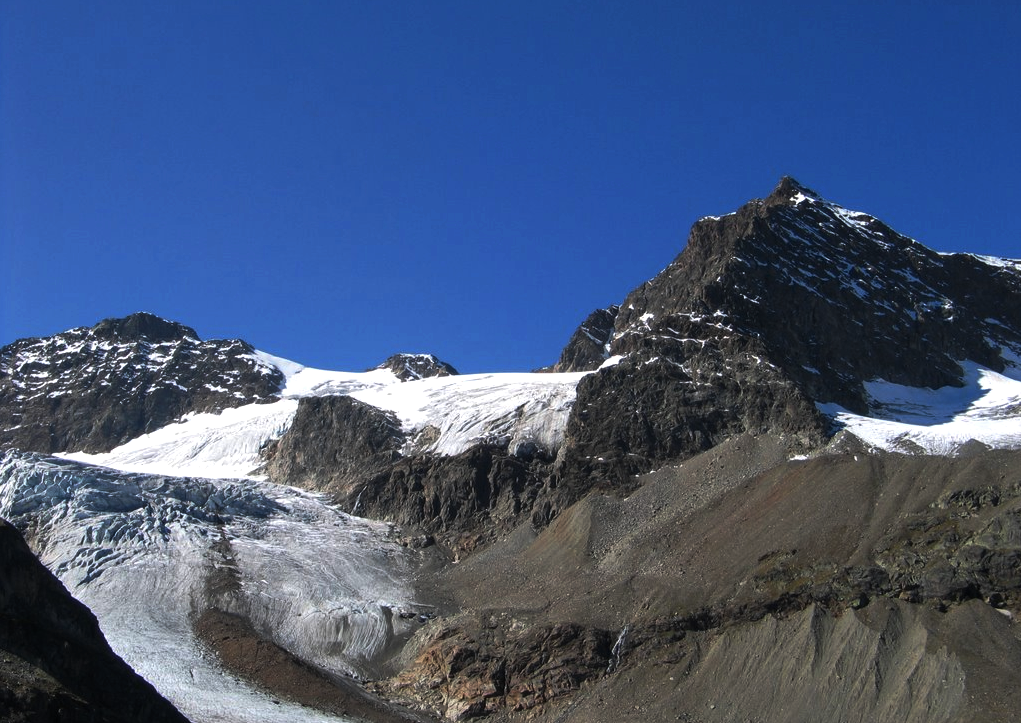
Piz Buin from east

Peak	Elevation
Piz Linard	3,411 m (11,191 ft)
Fluchthorn	3,399 m (11,152 ft)
Piz Buin	3,312 m (10,866 ft)
Verstanclahorn	3,301 m (10,830 ft)
Piz Fliana	3,284 m (10,774 ft)
Silvrettahorn	3,244 m (10,643 ft)
Augstenberg	3,228 m (10,591 ft)
Plattenhörner	3,221 m (10,568 ft)
Dreiländerspitze	3,212 m (10,538 ft)
Piz Tasna	3,183 m (10,443 ft)
Gross Seehorn	3,123 m (10,246 ft)
Gross Litzner	3,111 m (10,207 ft)
Flüela Wisshorn	3,088 m (10,131 ft)
Piz Minschun	3,072 m (10,079 ft)
Piz Murtera	3,044 m (9,987 ft)
Piz Davo Lais	3,027 m (9,931 ft)
Unghürhörner	2,994 m (9,823 ft)
Piz d'Anschatscha	2,983 m (9,787 ft)
Piz da las Clavigliadas	2,983 m (9,787 ft)
Pischahorn	2,982 m (9,783 ft)
Piz Chapisun	2,931 m (9,616 ft)
Hohes Rad	2,912 m (9,554 ft)
Roggenhorn	2,891 m (9,485 ft)
Rotbüelspitz	2,852 m (9,357 ft)
Chessler	2,836 m (9,304 ft)
Hochmaderer	2,823 m (9,262 ft)
Vallüla	2,813 m (9,229 ft)

== Mountain huts ==
- Berghaus-Verein, private
- Bodenalpenhaus, private
- Chamanna Dal Linard, Swiss Alpine Club (SAC)
- Fergen Hut, SAC
- Heidelberger Hut, German Alpine Club (DAV), Heidelberg Section
- Jamtal Hut DAV, Schwaben Section
- Klostertaler Umwelt Hut, DAV
- Madlenerhaus, DAV Wiesbaden Section
- Saarbrücken Hut, DAV, Alpenverein u. Skiclub Silvretta
- Seetal Hut, SAC
- Silvretta Hut, SAC
- Tuoi Hut, SAC
- Tübingen Hut, DAV, Tübingen Section
- Wiesbaden Hut, DAV Wiesbaden Section

== Ski areas in the Silvretta Alps ==
- Silvretta Montafon – Vorarlberg, Austria – largest ski area offering 113 km of slopes
- Silvretta Bielerhöhe – Partenen – Vorarlberg, Austria
- Gargellen – Vorarlberg, Austria
- Galtür – Silvapark – Tyrol, Austria
- Scuol (Motta Naluns) – Graubünden, Switzerland
- Parsenn (Davos Klosters) – Graubünden, Switzerland – highest ski area which extends up to an altitude of 2,844m
- Madrisa (Davos Klosters) – Graubünden, Switzerland
- Pischa (Davos Klosters) – Graubünden, Switzerland
- Selfranga – Klosters – Graubünden, Switzerland
- Ardez – Graubünden, Switzerland
- Guarda – Graubünden, Switzerland

== See also ==
- Passes of the Silvretta and Rätikon Ranges
- Swiss Alps
