= Piz Linard =

Mountain in Switzerland

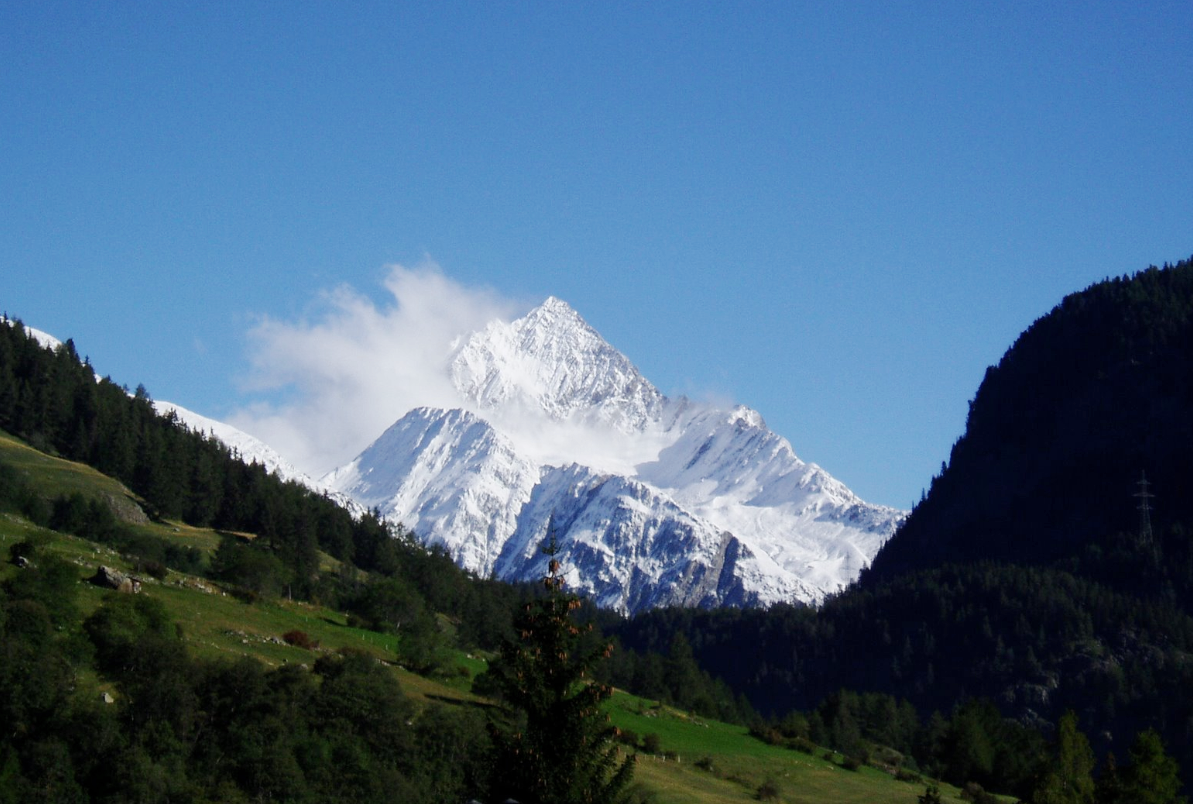
- View of Piz Linard from the Engadine valley (south)

Highest point
- Elevation: 3,410 m (11,190 ft)
- Prominence: 1,027 m (3,369 ft)
- Parent peak: Piz Kesch
- Isolation: 24.9 km (15.5 mi) to Piz Kesch
- Listing: List of mountains of Switzerland, Alpine mountains above 3000 m
- Coordinates: 46°47′56″N 10°04′17″E

Geography
- Location within Switzerland
- Location: Graubünden, Switzerland
- Parent range: Silvretta Alps

Climbing
- First ascent: August 1, 1835 by Oswald Heer and Johann Madutz
- Easiest route: Scramble

Piz Linard is a pyramid-shaped mountain of the Swiss Alps. At 3,410 m it is the highest peak of the Silvretta mountain range.

It was first climbed on August 1, 1835, by the geologist and naturalist Oswald Heer led by Johann Madutz.

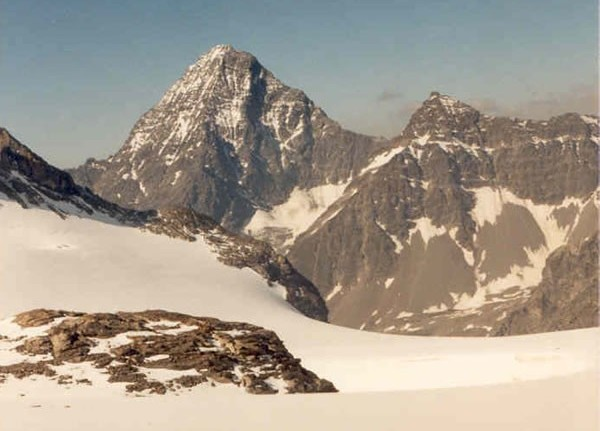
Piz Linard from the north in July 1986

There is a legend that a man of name "Chounard" reached the summit in 1572 carrying a large golden cross; however, the cross has never been found.

Piz Linard is located between the valleys of Val Lavinuoz (east) and Val Saglains (west), both part of the basin of the Inn river in the Engadine valley.

== See also ==
- List of most isolated mountains of Switzerland
