= Flimspitz =

Mountain in Switzerland

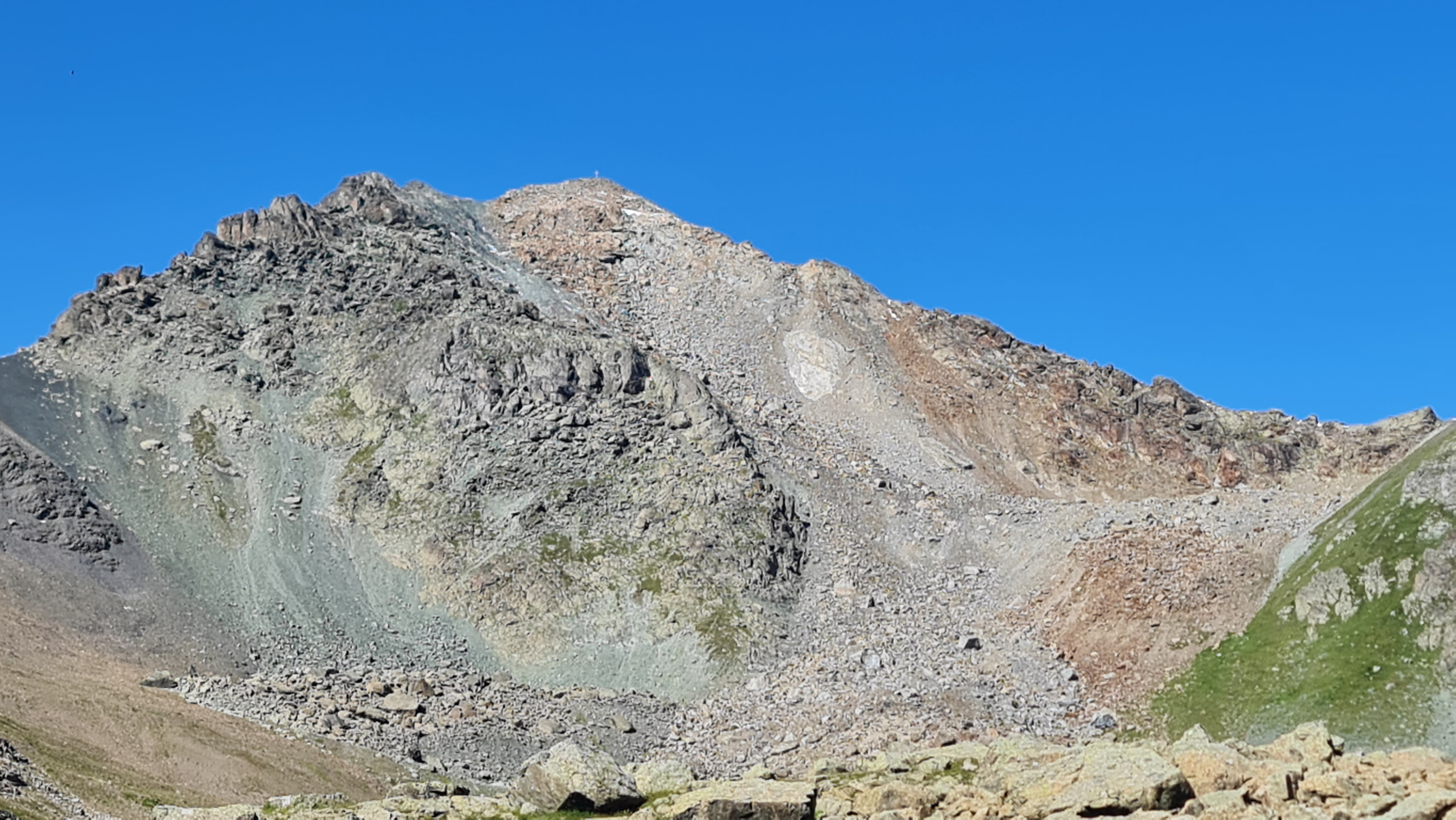

Highest point
- Elevation: 2,929 m (9,610 ft)
- Prominence: 172 m (564 ft)
- Parent peak: Vesulspitze
- Coordinates: 46°58′56″N 10°20′38″E

Geography
- Location within Alps
- Location: Graubünden, Switzerland; Tyrol, Austria
- Parent range: Samnaun Alps

Flimspitz (2,929 m) is a mountain of the Samnaun Alps, located on the border between Switzerland and Austria. It lies on the range between the Greitspitz and the Bürkelkopf.

From the Flimjoch a trail leads to the summit of the mountain.
