= Val Sinestra =

Coordinates: 46.8507°N 10.3367°E

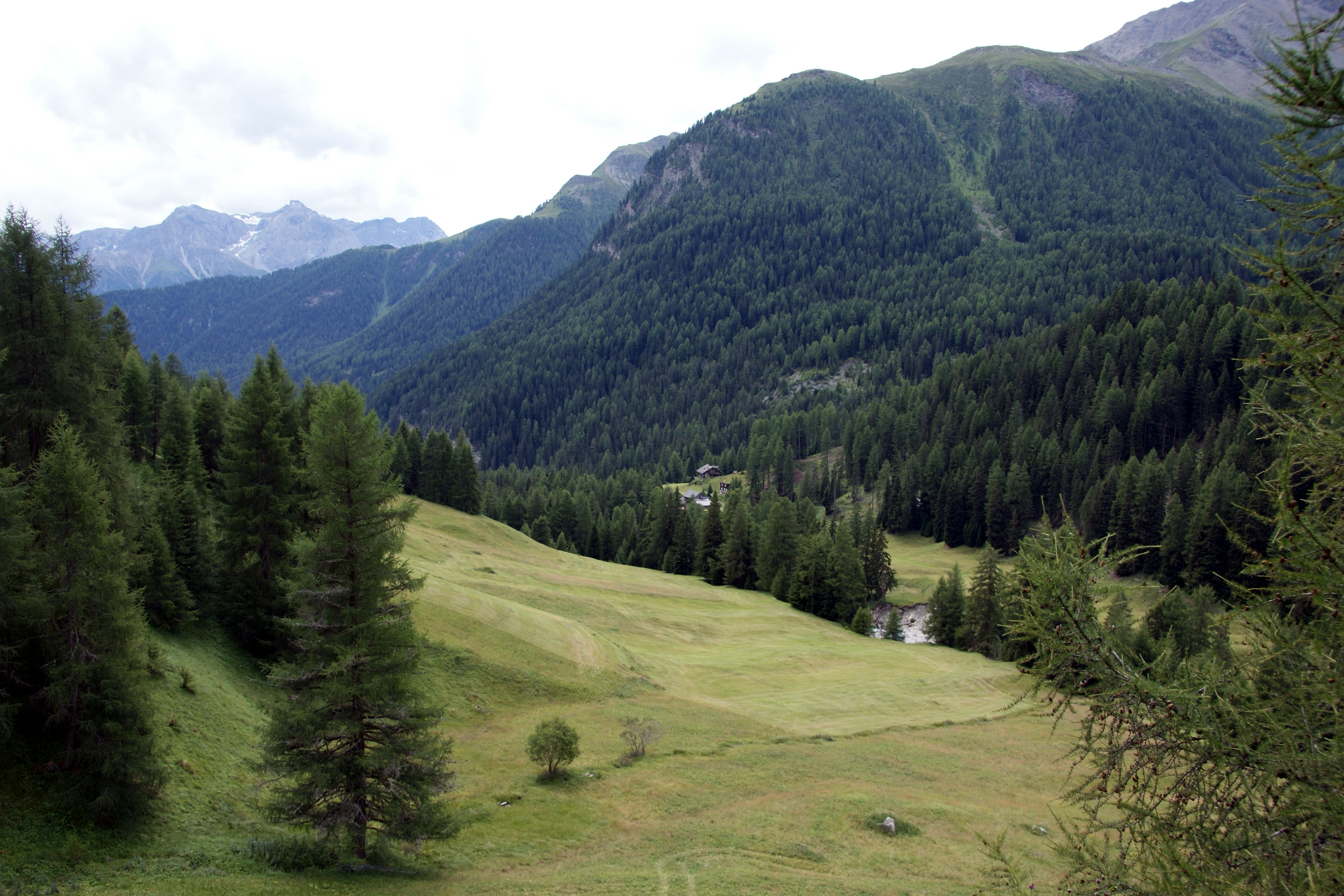
Val Sinestra with Zuort in the middle

The Val Sinestra (Romansh lit.: "left valley") is a valley of the Swiss Alps, located in the Engadin between the Silvretta and the Samnaun ranges. The valley is drained by La Brancla, a tributary of the Inn basin, near Ramosch. The highest mountains in the Val Sinestra are the Muttler (3,293 m), Piz Tschütta (3,254 m) and Piz Tasna (3,179 m). The valley is approximately 10 kilometres long.

The valley belongs to the municipalities of Sent and Ramosch in the Swiss canton of Graubünden. The main localities in Val Sinestra are Zuort and Vnà.

The Val Sinestra is connected to the Val Fenga by the 2,608 metre high pass named Cuolmen d'Fenga.

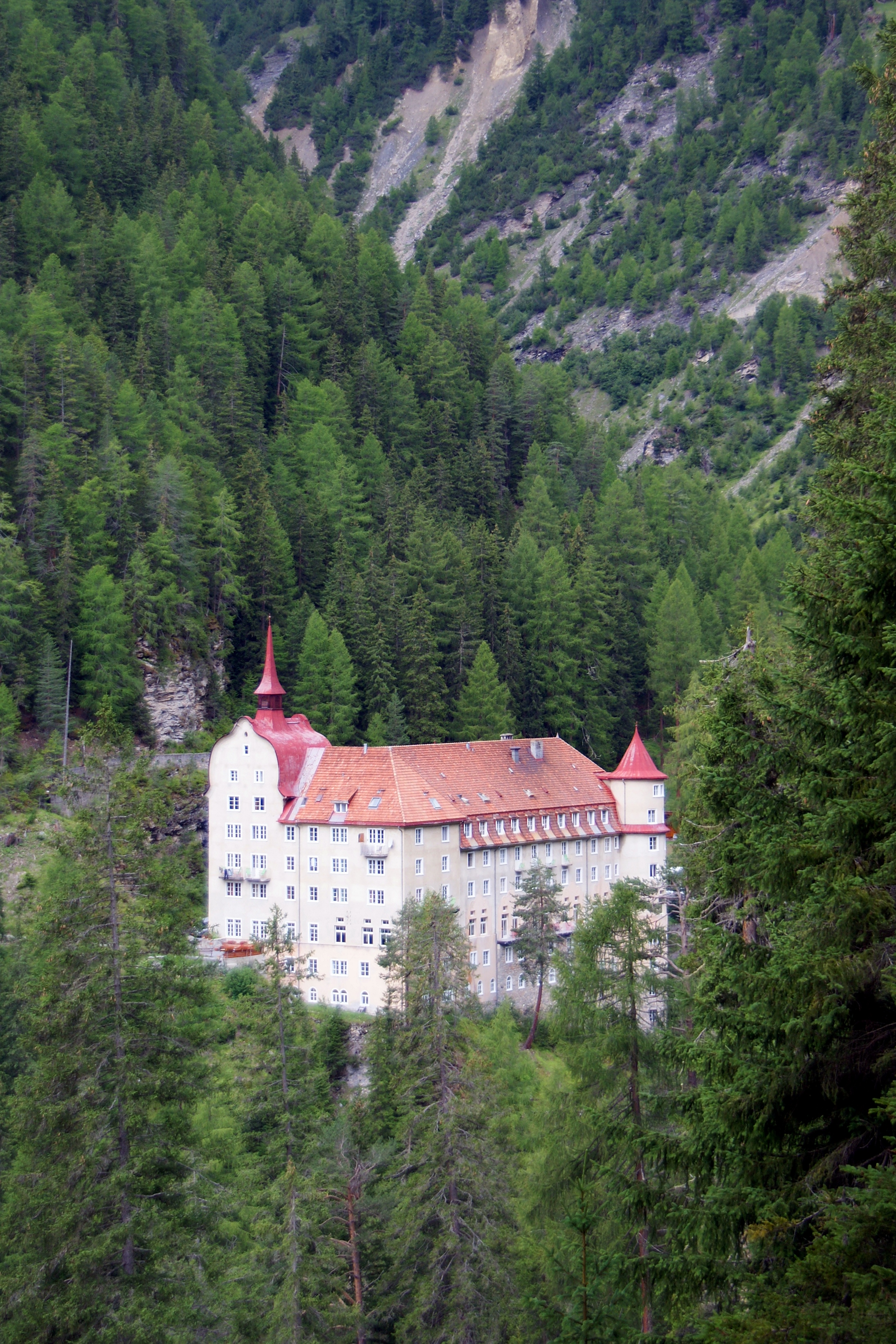
The Hotel Val Sinestra

There is also a Hotel from 1912 in the valley, which used to serve as a Kurhaus (spa house). The 2022 Dutch film Hotel Sinestra takes place at this hotel.

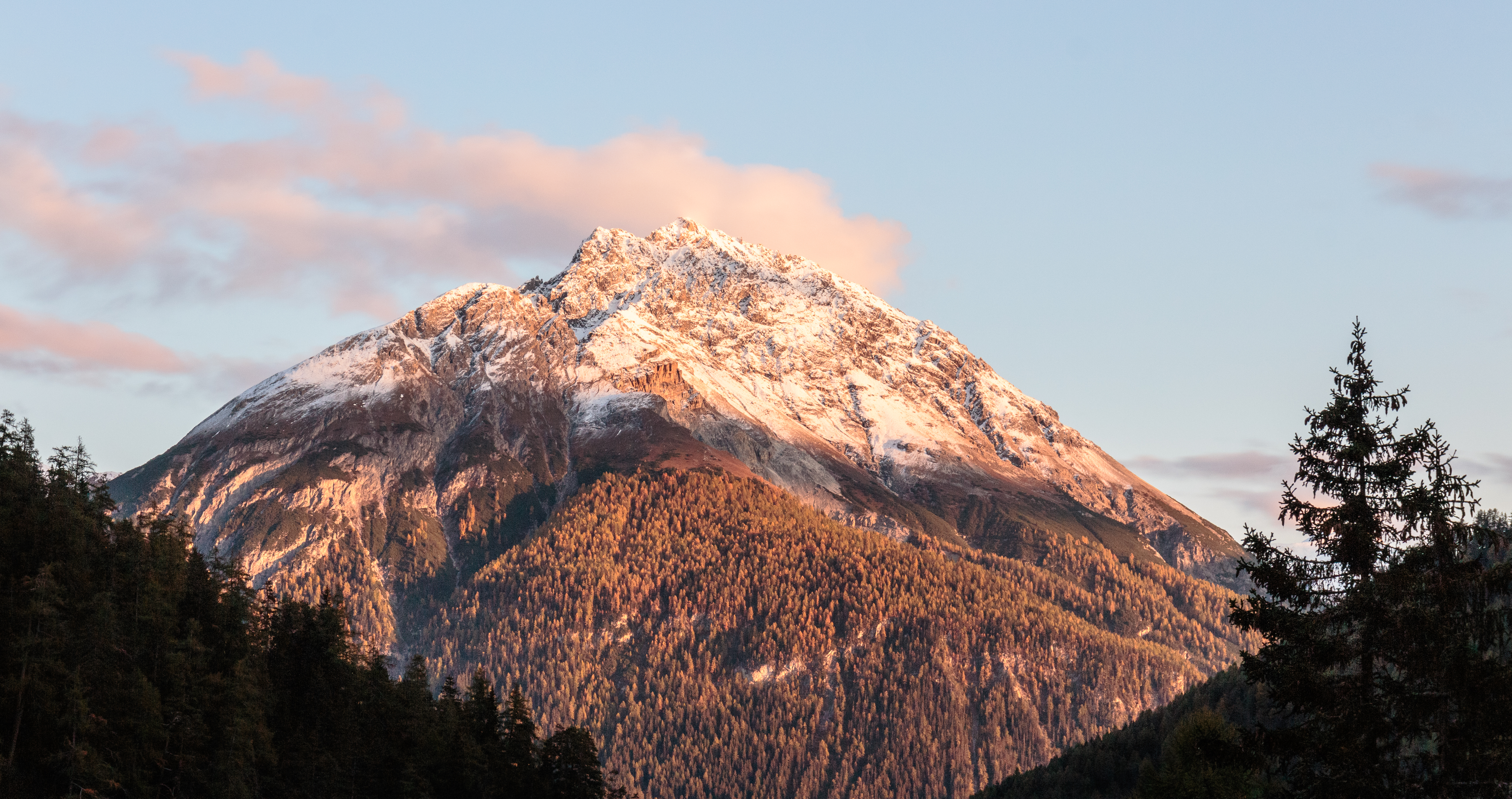
View from Val Sinestra.
