= Piz Malmurainza =

Mountain in Switzerland

- Location within Switzerland

Highest point
- Elevation: 3,038 m (9,967 ft)
- Prominence: 229 m (751 ft)
- Parent peak: Piz Mundin
- Coordinates: 46°54′22″N 10°24′26″E

Geography
- Location: Graubünden, Switzerland
- Parent range: Samnaun Alps

Piz Malmurainza (3,038 m) is a mountain of the Swiss Samnaun Alps, located north of Tschlin in the canton of Graubünden. It lies between the Muttler and Piz Mundin, on the range separating the main Inn valley from the Samnaun valley.
