= Hexenkopf =

Mountain in Austria

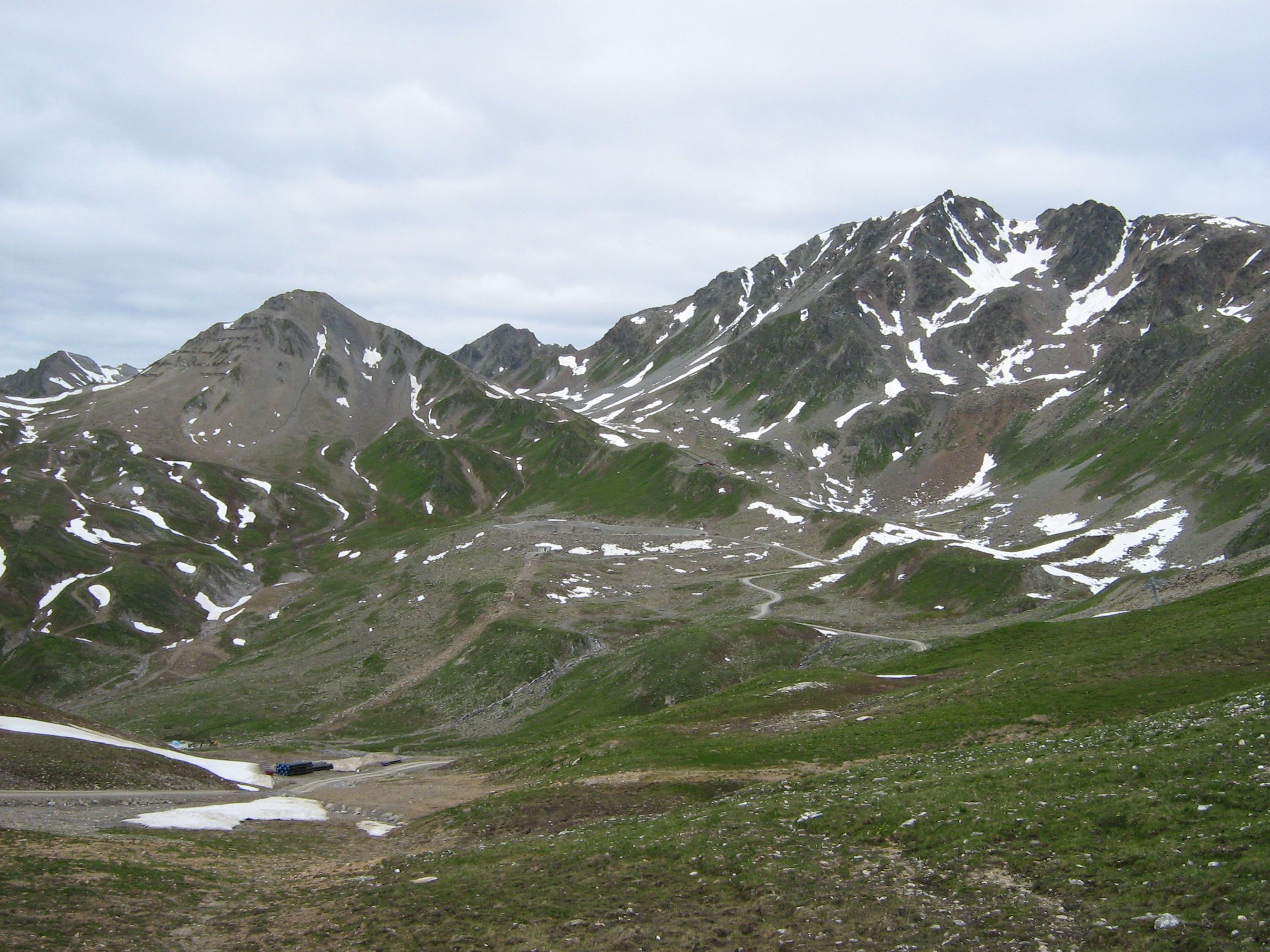
- View from the Arrezjoch col to the east of the Masnerkopf (l) and the Hexenkopf (r)

Highest point
- Elevation: 3,035 m (AA) (9,957 ft)
- Prominence: 371 m ↓ Eastern Fließer Scharte
- Isolation: 9.4 km → Vesulspitze
- Listing: Alpine mountains above 3000 m
- Coordinates: 47°01′16″N 10°28′08″E

Geography
- Location within Austria
- Location: Tyrol, Austria
- Parent range: Samnaun Group

Climbing
- Normal route: north arête (UIAA grade I)

The Hexenkopf is a mountain, 3,035 m (AA), in the Samnaun Group in the Alps in the Austrian state of Tyrol.

== Location and surrounding area ==
The Hexenkopf lies on the northern chain of the Samnaun Group between the valleys of Paznauntal in the north and Oberinntal in the south. Its neighbouring peak to the west is the 2,914 m high Gmaierkopf; to the south, separated by the Hexen Saddle, is the 2,828 m high Masnerkopf. To the southeast is the Masneralpe, which has been developed for winter sports by the Serfaus-Fiss-Ladis ski region. The Hexensee Hut (2,588 m) on the lake of Hexensee is one of the most important bases for an ascent of the Hexenkopfs. In the east the 2,685 m high Masnerjoch col separates the Hexenkopf from the 2,845 m high Arrezkopf; this chain runs eastwards to the 3,004 m high Furgler. To the north another ridge to the Plattkopf (2,893 m) separates the alpine meadows of Hinterflathalpe in the west from Berglialpe in the east.

== Geology ==
The Hexenkopf is largely composed of mica-rich slate gneiss, which is interspersed with veins of pegmatite and other granitic rocks. In addition, there are small deposits of strong, hornblende-containing amphibolite.

== Ascents ==
Unlike the nearby and oft-visited Furgler, the Hexenkopf is very rarely climbed. That is because, on the one hand it is further from the top station of the Lazidbahn from the tourist resort of Serfaus and, on the other, it is more difficult to climb.

From the Masnerjoch col there is a waymarked route running initially westwards, and then along the northern arête of the Hexenkopf to the top. This exposed rocky ridge has climbing sections of UIAA grade I. The Masnerjoch may be reached from the Hexensee Hut, from the Kölner Haus (1,965 m) near Serfaus or from the north, from See in the Paznauntal valley. Even the Ascher Hut (2,256 m) here is a possible base.

Another waymarked, but trackless, ascent runs from the Hexensattel along the south arête to the summit.

== Literature ==
- Paul Werner; Ludwig Thoma (1982), Deutscher Alpenverein; Österreichischer Alpenverein; Alpenverein Südtirol (eds.), Alpenvereinsführer Samnaungruppe (in German) (2. ed.), München: Rother, pp. 157–161, ISBN 3-7633-1241-2
