= Palinkopf =

Mountain in Switzerland

- Paliner Kopf
- Location within Alps

Highest point
- Elevation: 2,864 m (9,396 ft)
- Prominence: 171 m (561 ft)
- Parent peak: Vesulspitze
- Coordinates: 46°57′00″N 10°18′34″E

Geography
- Location: Graubünden, Switzerland; Tyrol, Austria
- Parent range: Samnaun Alps

The Palinkopf (also spelled Paliner Kopf) (2,864 m) is a mountain of the Samnaun Alps, located on the border between Switzerland and Austria. It lies west of Samnaun and is part of the Samnaun-Ischgl ski area.
