= Piz Tschütta =

Mountain in Switzerland

- Stammerspitz
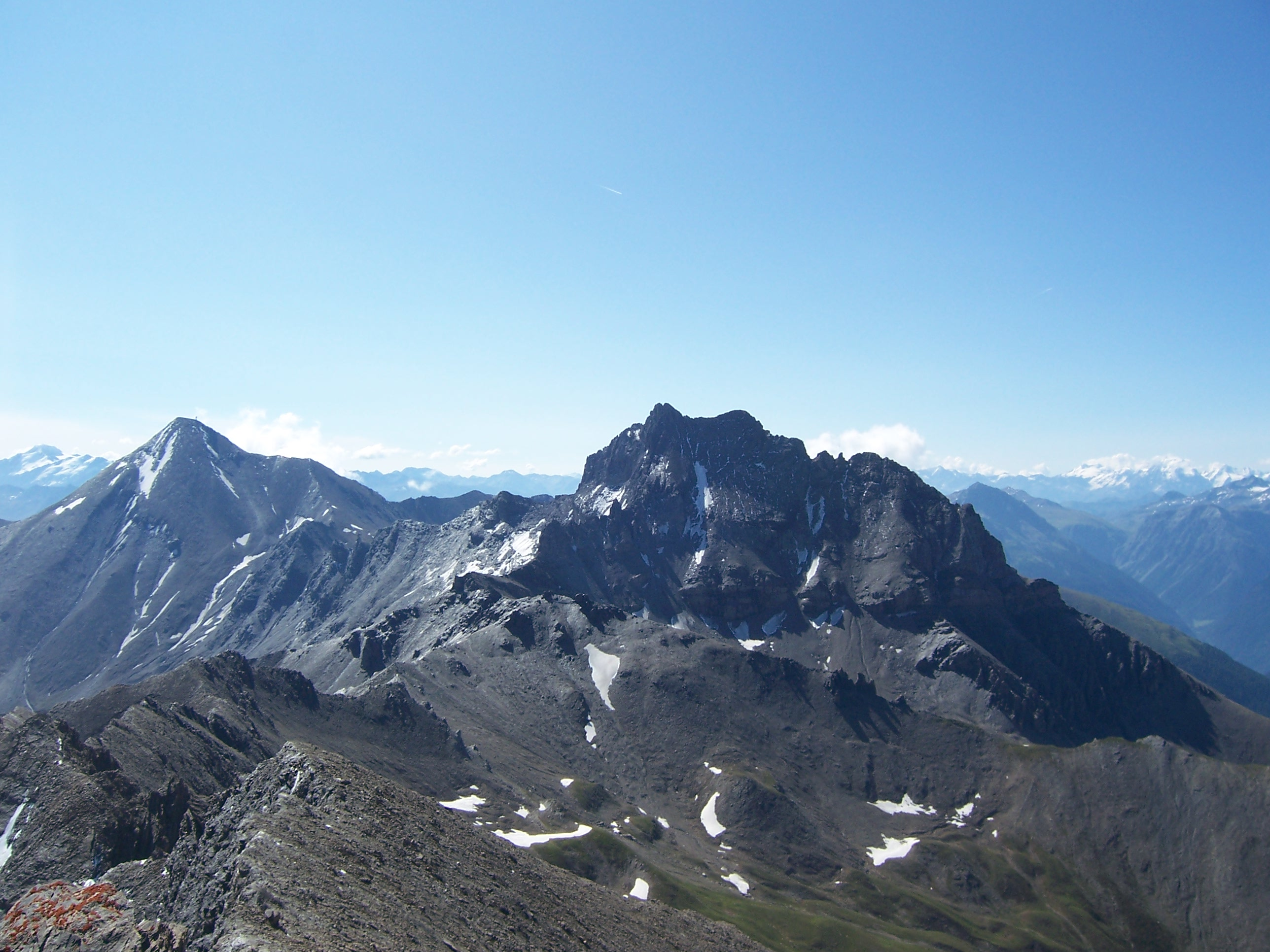
- Muttler (left) and Piz Tschütta (right) from Piz Rots

Highest point
- Elevation: 3,254 m (10,676 ft)
- Prominence: 406 m (1,332 ft)
- Parent peak: Muttler
- Listing: Alpine mountains above 3000 m
- Coordinates: 46°54′13.4″N 10°20′36.2″E

Geography
- Location within Switzerland
- Location: Graubünden, Switzerland
- Parent range: Samnaun Alps

Piz Tschütta (also known as Stammerspitz) is a mountain of the Samnaun Alps, overlooking Samnaun in the canton of Graubünden. With an elevation of 3,254 metres (10,676 ft) above sea level, it is the second highest mountain of the Samnaun Alps.

It lies about 3 km north-west from the Muttler, the highest mountain of the Samnaun Alps. The first ascent was on 16. August 1884 by K. Schulze, Johann Nell and Seraphim Kuppelwieser.
