= Fimbatal =

Coordinates: 46°57′48″N 10°17′02″E

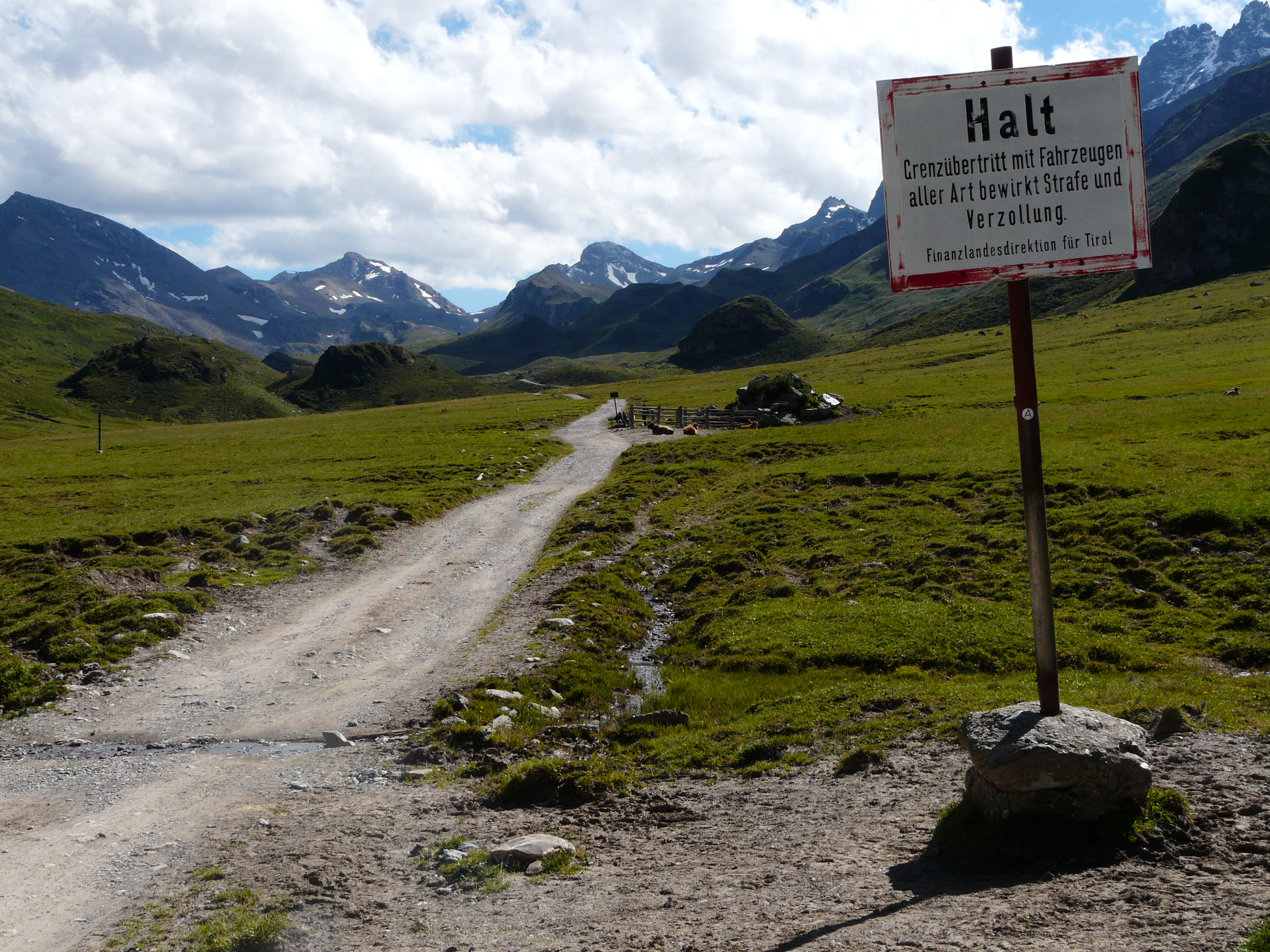
Fimbatal looking south (from the international border)

The Fimbatal, also Fimbertal, (Romansh: Val Fenga) is an alpine valley situated between the Silvretta Alps and the Samnaun Alps. The valley is drained by the Fimbabach river (Aua da Fenga), a tributary of the Inn basin (Trisanna) at Ischgl. The highest mountain bordering the Fimbatal is the Fluchthorn (Piz Fenga) (3399 m).

The Fimbatal is politically divided between Austria and Switzerland. The lower northern part belongs to the Austrian state of Tyrol (municipality of Ischgl) and the upper southern part belongs to the Swiss canton of Graubünden (municipalities of Sent and Valsot). The border runs from the Paraid Naira to Piz Rots, reaching an altitude of 2122 metres at valley floor. This unusual border situation exists since the late Middle Ages.

On the upper part, at an altitude of 2264 metres above sea level, lies the Heidelberger Hut.

The upper side of Fimbatal is connected to the Val Sinestra by the 2608-metre-high pass named Cuolmen d'Fenga (or Fimberpass). The footpath over it is the lowest trail connecting the valley to the rest of Switzerland, making the upper valley a virtual exclave.
