= VNA =

VNA may refer to:

== Medicine ==
- Vagal nerve activity, activity of the vagus nerve which connects the brain to the heart
- Ventral anterior nucleus, a nucleus of the thalamus
- Vertebral nerve activity, activity of the vertebral nerve, a nerve near the backbone and neck in vertebrates
- Virus-neutralizing antibody, antibodies that are specialized to bind to viral components such as viral glycoproteins.
- Vendor Neutral Archive, an archive for medical image storage that is independent of the picture archiving and communication system (PACS) that utilizes those images

== Science and technology ==
- Value network analysis, a methodology for handling value networks
- Vanillylamide of n-nonanoic acid, another name for the capsaicinoid nonivamide
- Vector network analyzer, an instrument for electrical circuits analysis, measuring both amplitude and phase properties
- Very narrow aisle, a common abbreviation for a type of forklift truck used in warehousing
- von Neumann architecture, a design model for a stored-program digital computer, utilized by virtually all modern computers

== Miscellaneous ==
- Vietnam News Agency, the official news agency of Vietnam
- Vietnamese National Army (1949–1955), the loyalist army in the First Indochina War
- Virgin New Adventures, a series of novels by Virgin Publishing based on the British television series Doctor Who
- Virgin Nigeria Airways, the former name of Nigerian Eagle Airlines, the national flag carrier of Nigeria
- Visiting Nurse Association, a type of home healthcare organization

=== Air transport codes ===
- The IATA airport designator of Saravane Airport, Salavan Province, Laos
- The ICAO airline designator of Empresa Aviación Interamericana, Uruguay

== See also ==
- Vnà, a village in the Lower Engadine, Graubünden, Switzerland
