= Greitspitz =

Mountain in Switzerland

- Greitspitze
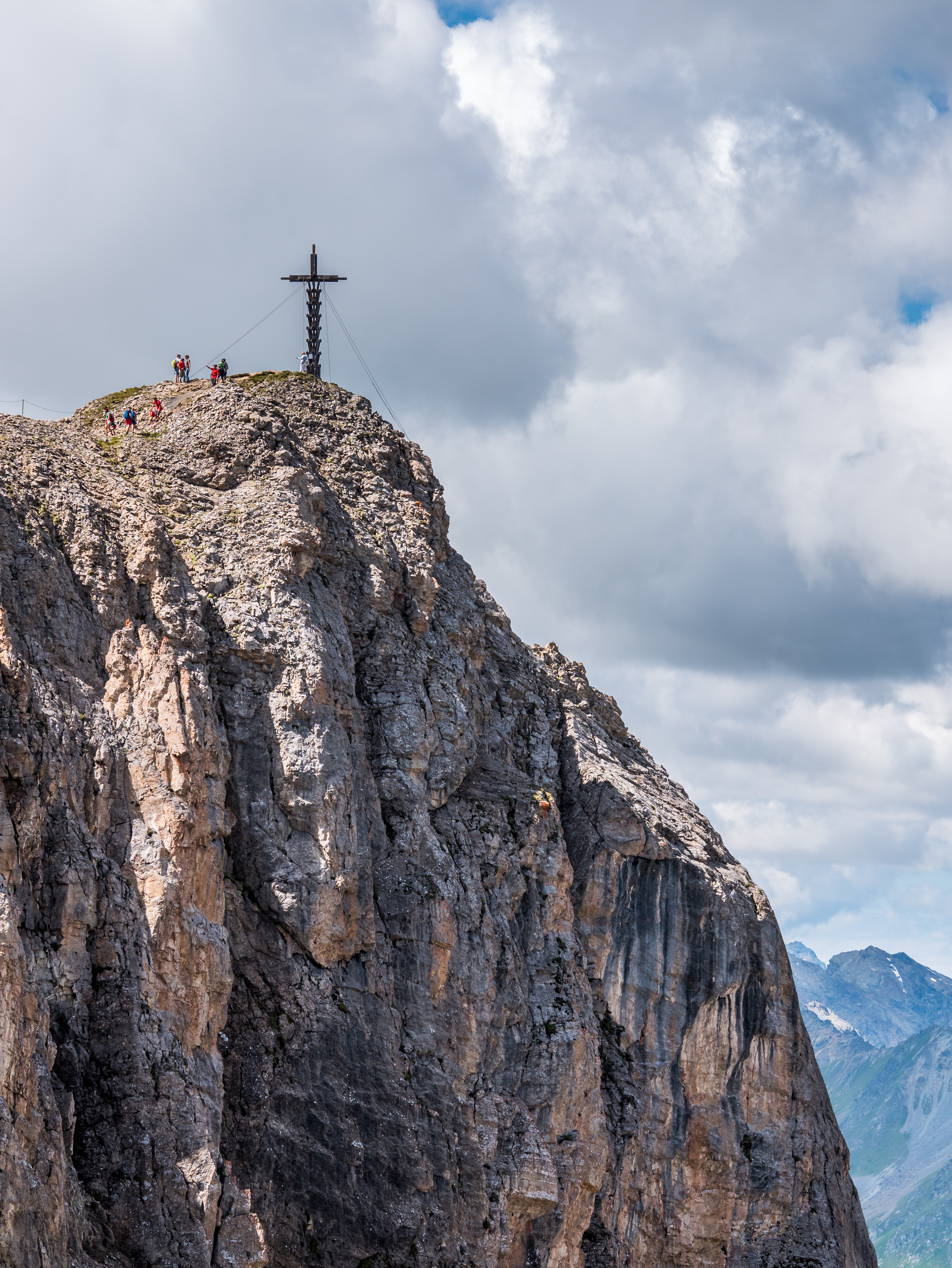
- Greitspitz with the Fimbatal in the Background.

Highest point
- Elevation: 2,871 m (9,419 ft)
- Prominence: 138 m (453 ft)
- Parent peak: Vesulspitze
- Coordinates: 46°58′13″N 10°20′03″E

Geography
- Location within Alps
- Location: Graubünden, Switzerland; Tyrol, Austria
- Parent range: Samnaun Alps

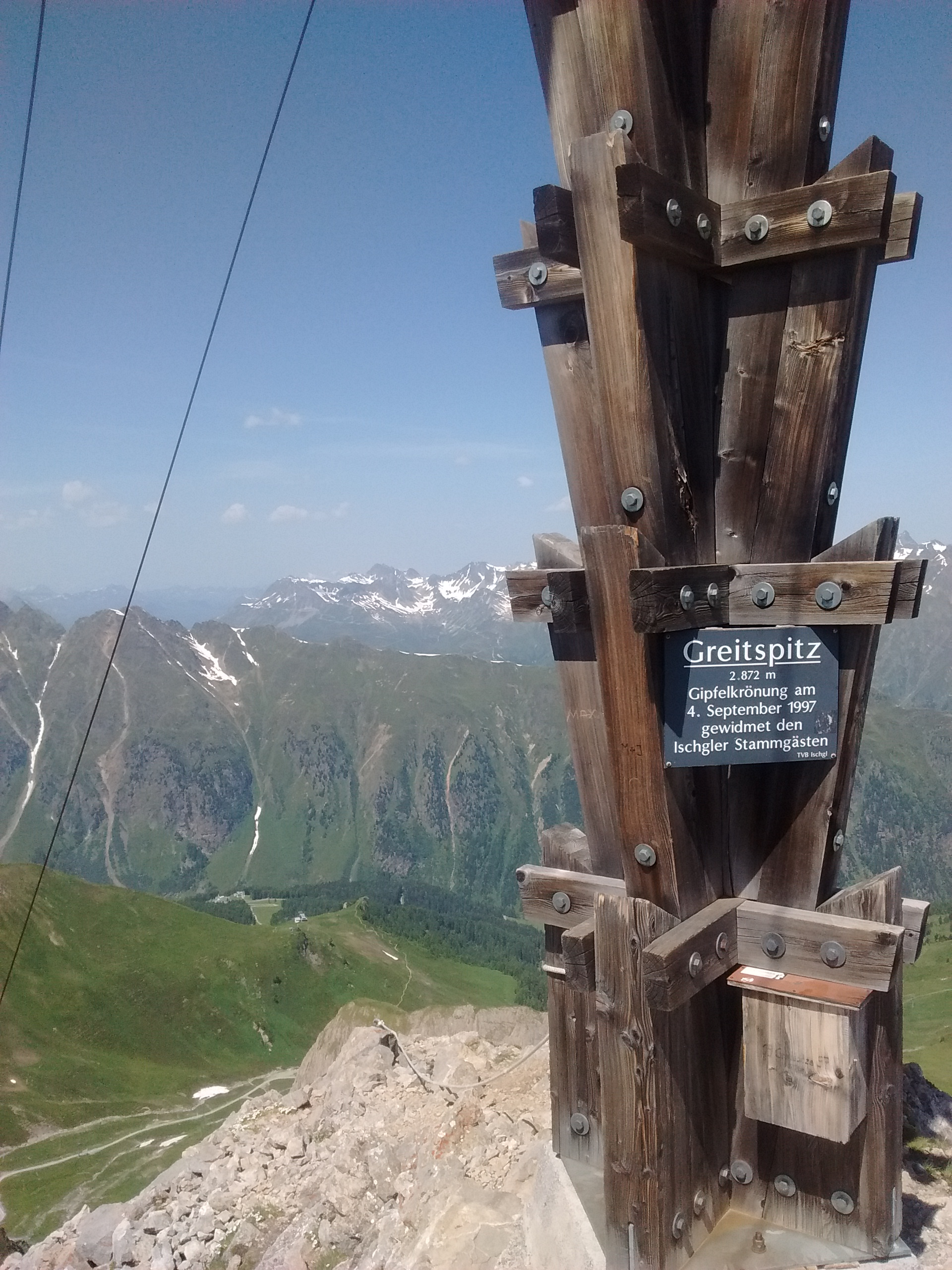
Greitspitz Peak

The Greitspitz (also spelled Greitspitze) (2,871 m; also referenced as 2,872 m) is a mountain of the Samnaun Alps, located on the border between Switzerland and Austria. It lies approximately halfway between Samnaun and Ischgl.

In winter it is part of the ski area Silvretta Arena.
