= Piz Mundin =

Mountain in Switzerland

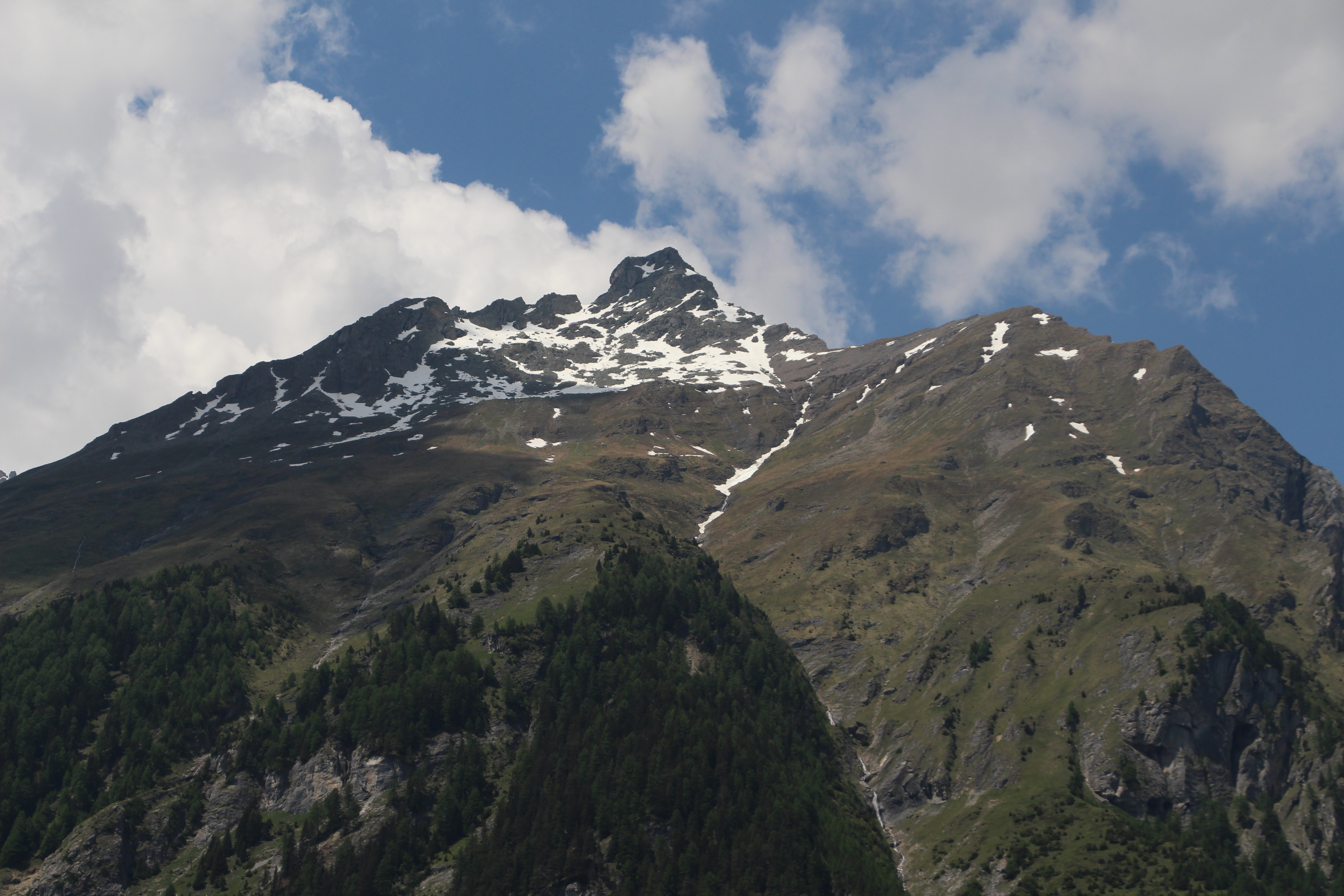
- Piz Mundin as seen from the Finstermünzpass

Highest point
- Elevation: 3,146 m (10,322 ft)
- Prominence: 342 m (1,122 ft)
- Parent peak: Muttler
- Listing: Alpine mountains above 3000 m
- Coordinates: 46°55′31.3″N 10°25′50.7″E

Geography
- Location within Switzerland
- Location: Graubünden, Switzerland
- Parent range: Samnaun Alps

Climbing
- First ascent: 22 June 1849 by Johann Coaz and Jon Rag Tscharner

Piz Mundin is a mountain of the Samnaun Alps, located between Samnaun and Martina in the Swiss canton of Graubünden. With an elevation of 3,146 metres above sea level, Piz Mundin is one of the highest summits in the Samnaun Alps.
