= Bürkelkopf =

Mountain in Switzerland

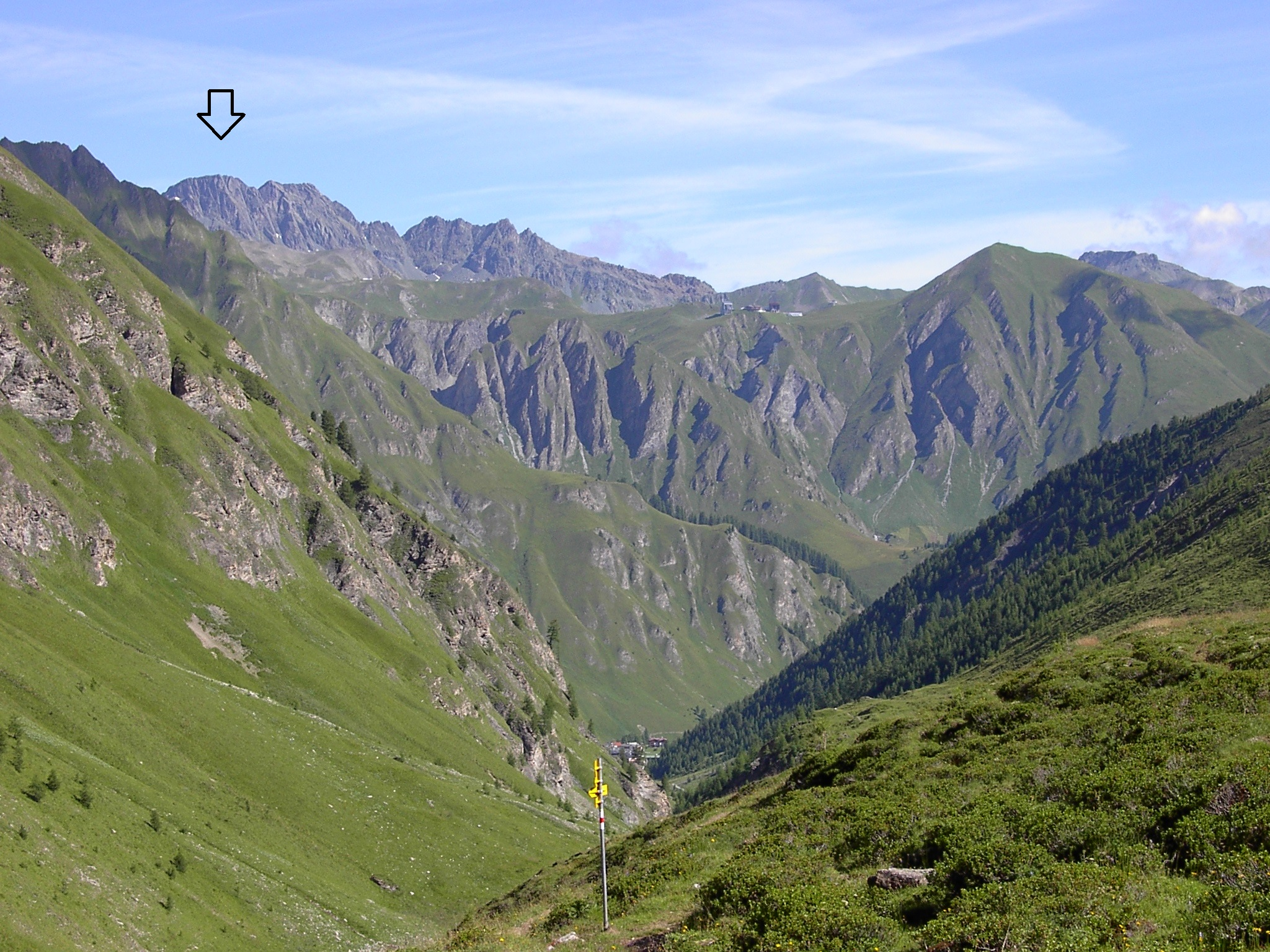
- Bürkelkopf

Highest point
- Elevation: 3,033 m (9,951 ft)
- Prominence: 229 m (751 ft)
- Parent peak: Vesulspitze
- Coordinates: 46°59′22.3″N 10°20′49.4″E

Geography
- Location within Alps
- Location: Graubünden, Switzerland; Tyrol, Austria
- Parent range: Samnaun Alps

Bürkelkopf is a mountain of the Samnaun Alps, located on the border between Austria and Switzerland. It lies between Ischgl (Tyrol) and Samnaun (Graubünden). In winter it is part of a ski area.
