= Grübelekopf =

Mountain in Switzerland

- Location within Alps

Highest point
- Elevation: 2,894 m (9,495 ft)
- Prominence: 19 m (62 ft)
- Parent peak: Ochsebnekopf
- Coordinates: 47°0′1.7″N 10°23′20.9″E

Geography
- Location: Graubünden, Switzerland/Tyrol, Austria
- Parent range: Samnaun Alps

The Grübelekopf (also spelled Grüblekopf or Gribellakopf) is a mountain of the Samnaun Alps, located on the border between Austria and Switzerland.

The Grübelekopf is the northernmost point of the Austrian-Swiss border in the Samnaun Alps and the tripoint between the Samnaun valley, the Visnitztal and the Grübeletal.
