= Paraid Naira =

Mountain in Switzerland

Gamspleisspitze
- Paraid Naira, Gemspleisspitze
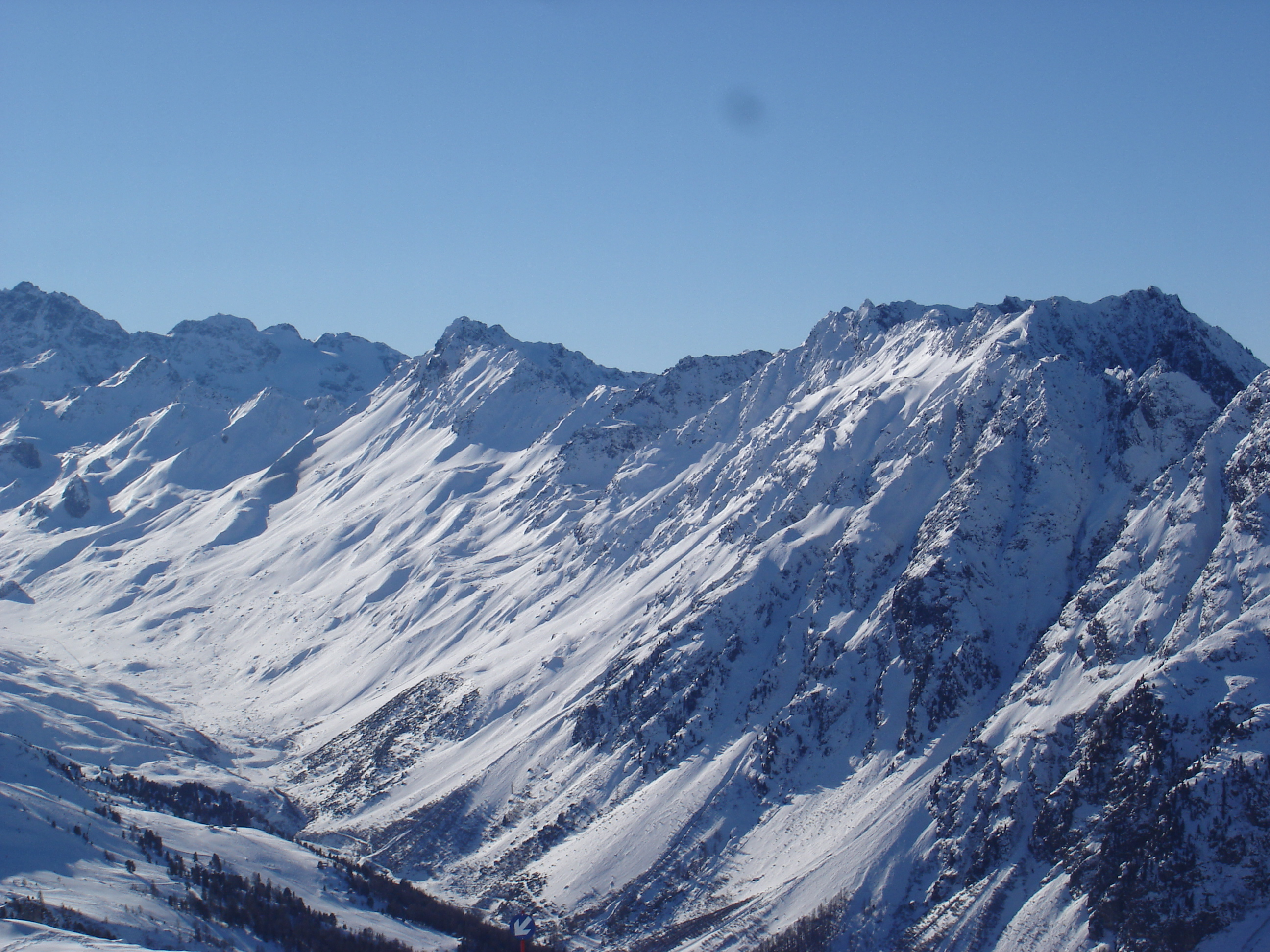

Highest point
- Elevation: 3,015 m (9,892 ft)
- Prominence: 329 m (1,079 ft)
- Parent peak: Fluchthorn
- Listing: Alpine mountains above 3000 m
- Coordinates: 46°55′53.8″N 10°14′29.7″E

Geography
- Location within Alps
- Location: Tyrol, Austria/Graubünden, Switzerland
- Parent range: Silvretta Alps

Climbing
- First ascent: 13 July 1849 by Johann Coaz

The Gamspleisspitze (German, also Gemspleisspitze) or Paraid Naira (Romansh) is a mountain of the Silvretta Alps, located on the border between Austria and Switzerland. From this peak, the border approaching south from the Fluchthorn departs east to intersect the neighboring valley in an Austrian lower (north) part named Fimbatal and an uninhabited Swiss upper (south) part, named Val Fenga. On the Austrian west site lies the also uninhabited Larein valley.
