= Heidelberger Hut =

Coordinates: 46°54′35″N 10°15′35″E

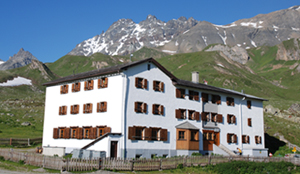
Heidelberger Hut

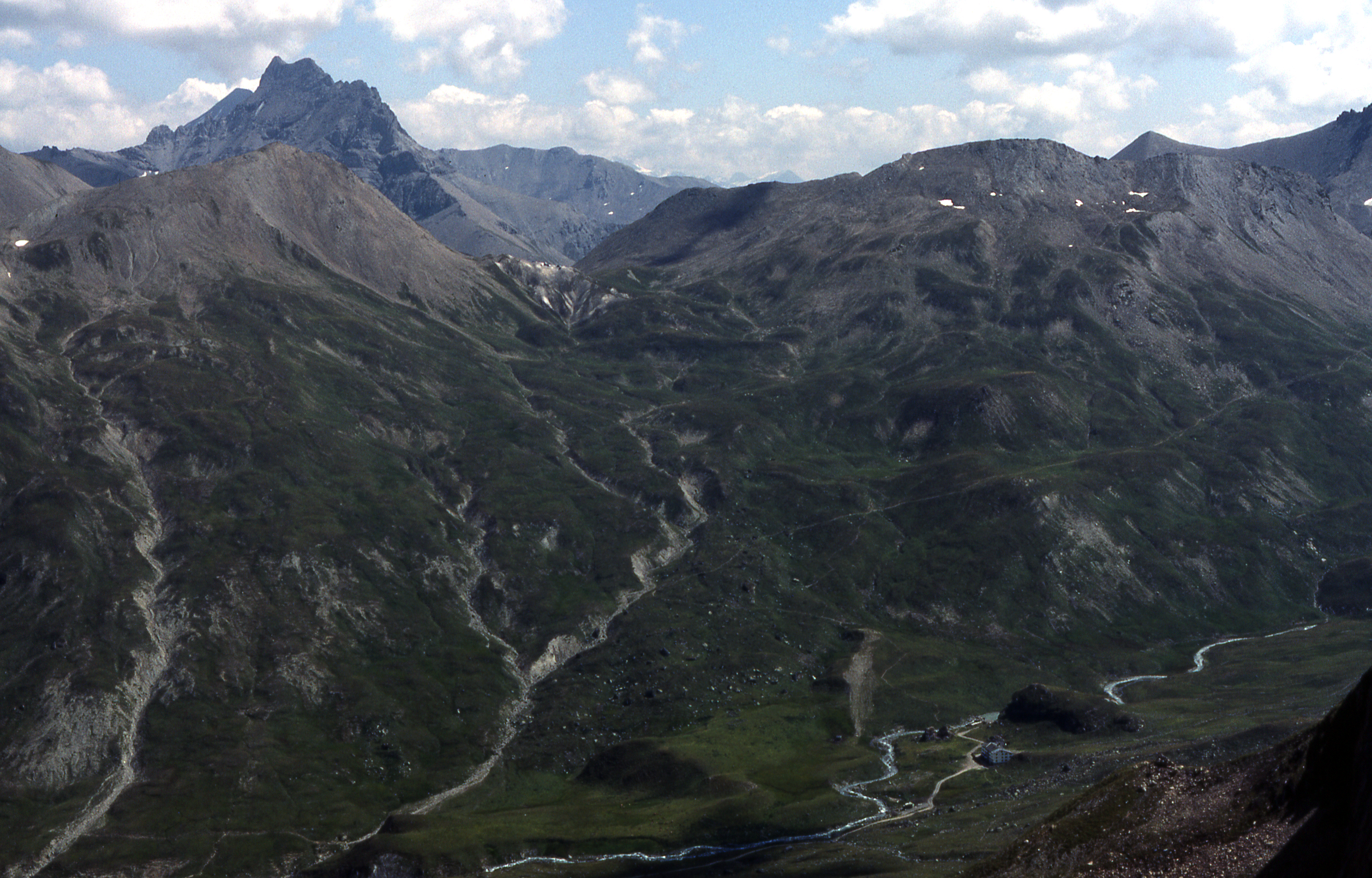
View from the west from the Ritzenjoch

The Heidelberger Hut (German: Heidelberger Hütte) is a mountain hut located in the Silvretta in the Swiss canton of Graubünden. It lies at an altitude of 2,264 metres above sea level in the Val Fenga.

The hut was built between 1887 and 1889 by the Heidelberg division of the German Alpine Club (DAV), which has operated it since. Since 1910, the hut has been a popular destination for winter sports as well. Major expansions were finished in 1963 and again in 1979.

Heidelberger hut is easily accessible from Ischgl, Austria, by a road through the Fimbatal, which south of the Austrian-Swiss border is named Val Fenga. On the other hand, the quickest routes from a Swiss settlement are about 5 hour hikes from either Ramosch via the 2,608 m Cuolemn de Fenga/Fimberpaß or from Samnaun via the 2539 m Zeblasjoch and 2752 m Fuorcla da Val Gronda. The hut is therefore supplied from Ischgl and staffed by Austrians.
