= Furgler =

Mountain in Austria

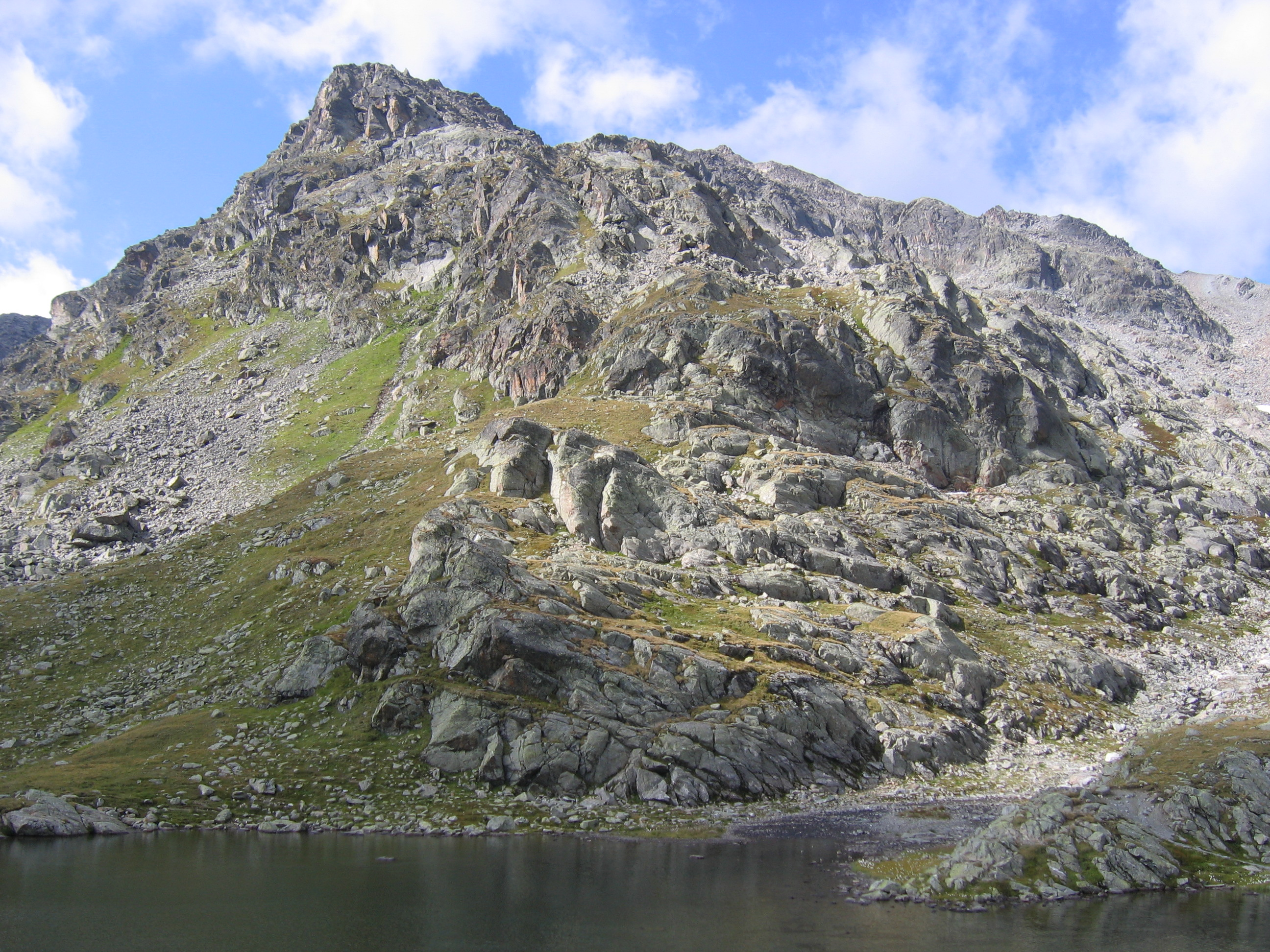
- The summit of the Furgler from the Furglersee

Highest point
- Elevation: 3,004 m (AA) (9,856 ft)
- Prominence: 319 m ↓ Masnerjoch
- Isolation: 3.9 km → Hexenkopf
- Listing: Alpine mountains above 3000 m
- Coordinates: 47°02′25″N 10°30′43″E

Geography
- Location within Austria
- Location: Tyrol, Austria
- Parent range: Samnaungruppe

The Furgler (also Großer Furgler, 3,004 m (AA)) is one of the most visited mountains of the Samnaun Alps in the Austrian state of Tyrol. The tourist resort of Serfaus, which is in the immediate vicinity, is often selected as the start point for tours of the mountain.

== Ascents ==
The ski area of Serfaus-Fiss-Ladis runs close to the mountain, which makes it much easier to climb. Start points here are the middle or top stations of the Komperdell lift on the Lazidkopf.

An ascent from the lift may be made on one of two waymarked paths:

- The northern route runs from the middle station (1,980 m) along the long-distance path no. 702 past the Furglersee (2,458 m), westwards through the Furgler valley, over the Furglerjoch col (2,748 m) and along the north arête to the summit cross.
- The southern route runs from the Lassida top station (2,351 m) over the Böderköpfe to the Scheid (2,429 m), continues to the Tieftalsee lake (2,783 m) and circumnavigates this to the southwest before reaching the summit.

Both routes may be combined in a crossing (taking about 5.5 hours). Climbing the southern route the crossing is slightly easier than the northern one. No special climbing equipment is needed, but good footwear is required.

- Another ascent runs from the Ascher Hut over the Furglerjoch up to the summit (ca. 4 hours).

In winter the Furgler is a popular ski touring mountain.

== Summit ==
There is a summit cross at the top of the Furgler which was erected in 1988, replacing the first cross put up in 1957. It is roughly nine metres high, made of wood and fixed with eight cables. Two memorial tablets recall these events: "Heiliges Kreuz sei unsere Fahne in dem Kampf und jeder Not die uns wecke die uns mahne treu zu sein bis in den Tod" (Errichtet von den Burschen und den Männern von Serfaus, 1957) and "Neu errichtet 1988 - Allen Helfern und Spendern Dank und Gottes Segen". The translation is: "Holy Cross be our banner in the battle and every adversity that befalls us that exhorts us to be true unto death" (erected by the boys and men of Serfaus, 1957) and "Newly erected in 1988 - Thanks and God bless to all those who helped and donated".

On another memorial tablet, Siegmund Oberacher (born 16 November 1944, died 23 March 1997) is commemorated by members of the Serfaus Mountain Rescue and by his family : "Wenn Du erschöpft bist, suche neue Kräfte in den Höhen der Berge, wo Du Gott und dir selber am nächsten sein kannst. Je höher man steigt, umso klarer wird das Wasser, umso reiner der Schnee, umso leuchtender das Himmelszelt. Ein jeder Tag ist wie ein kleines Jahr und jede Stunde Bergeinsamkeit ist Ewigkeit." The translation is: "When you're exhausted, seek new strength in the heights of the mountains where you can be closest to God and yourself. The higher you climb, the clearer is the water, the purer the snow, the more brilliant the sky. Every day is like a little year and every hour of mountain solitude is eternity."

In good weather there is an outstanding all-round view from the summit of countless Alpine summits.

== Gallery ==
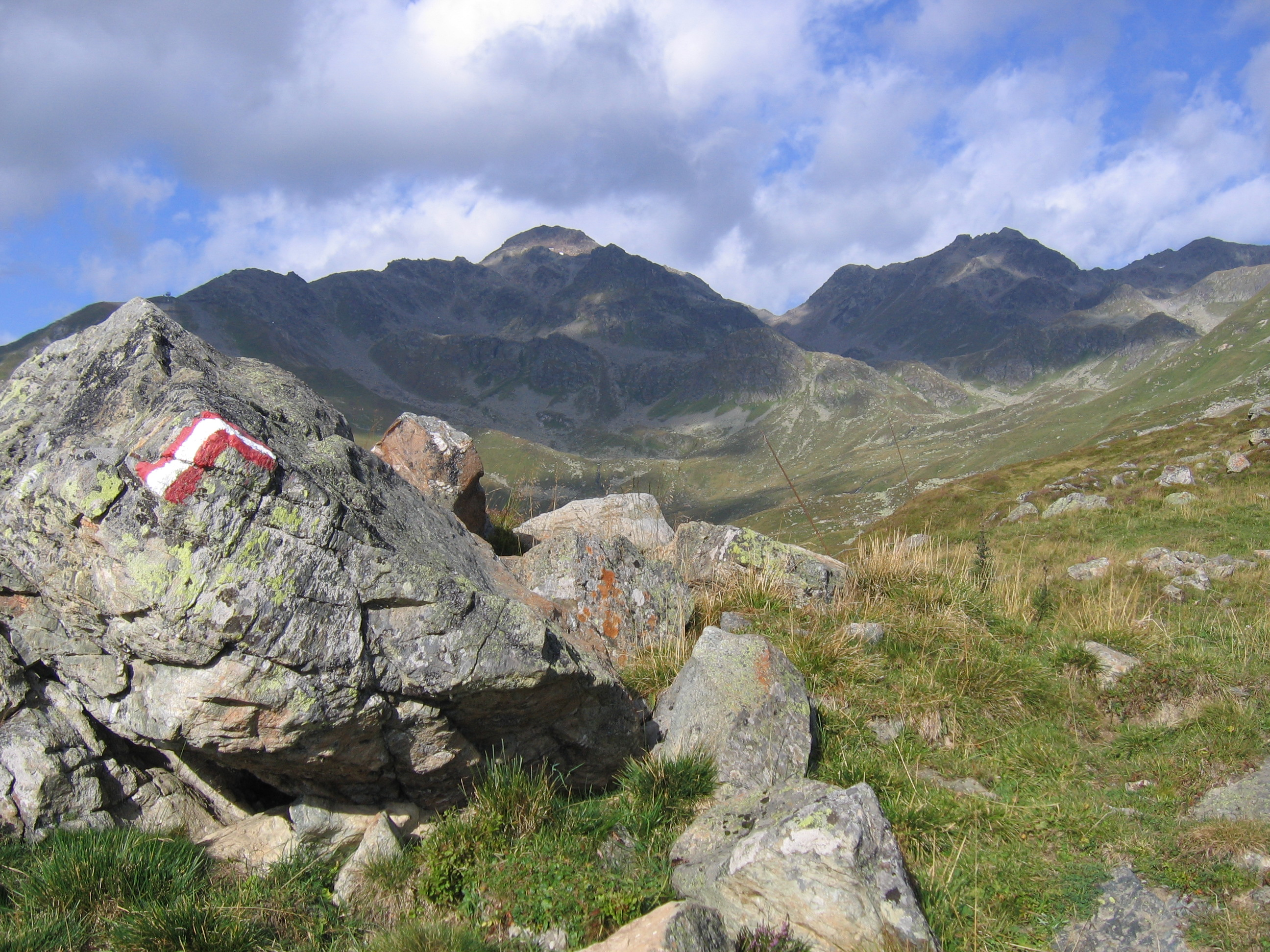
The Furgler (left) seen from the Kölner Haus

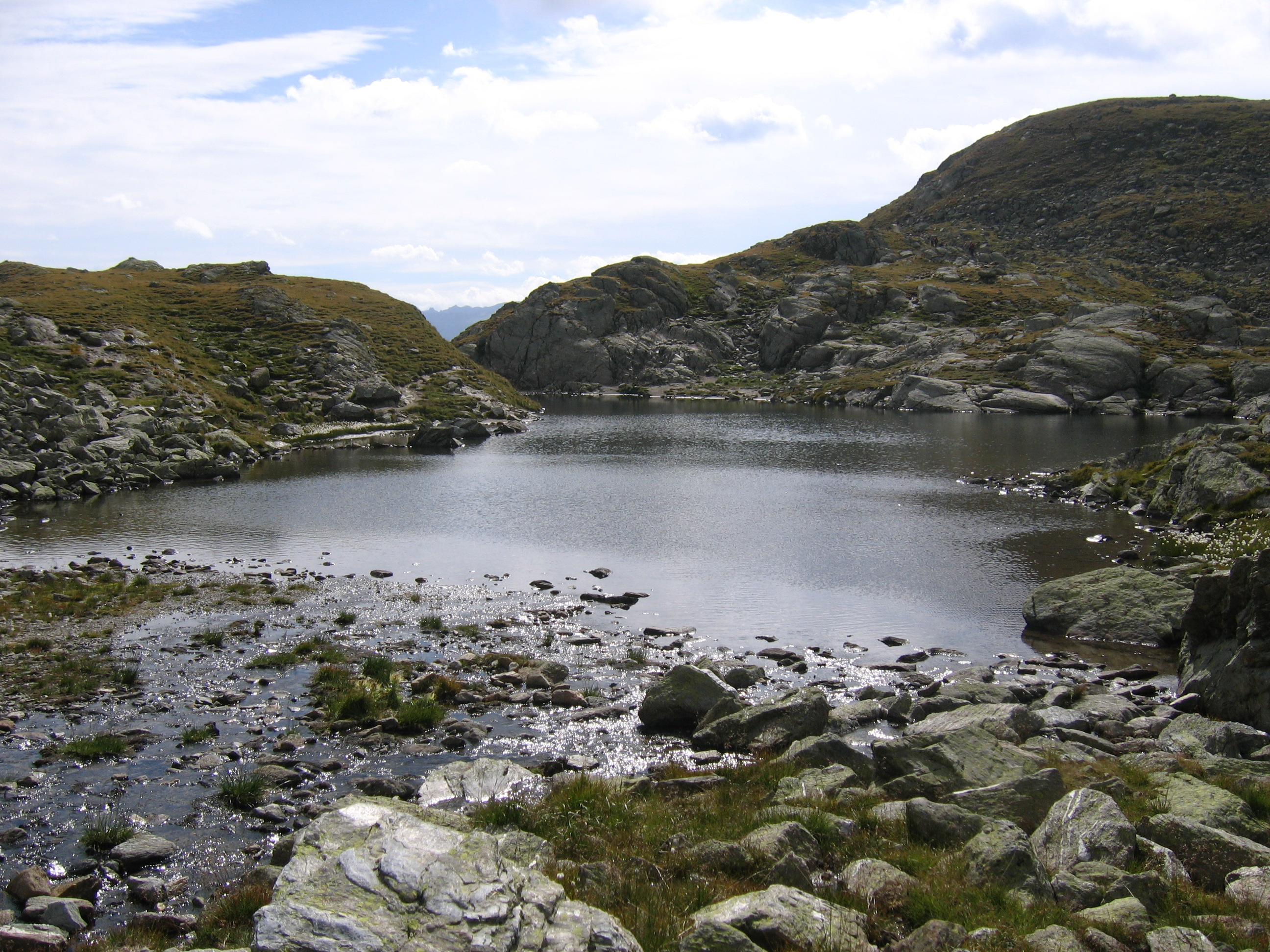
The lake of Furglersee

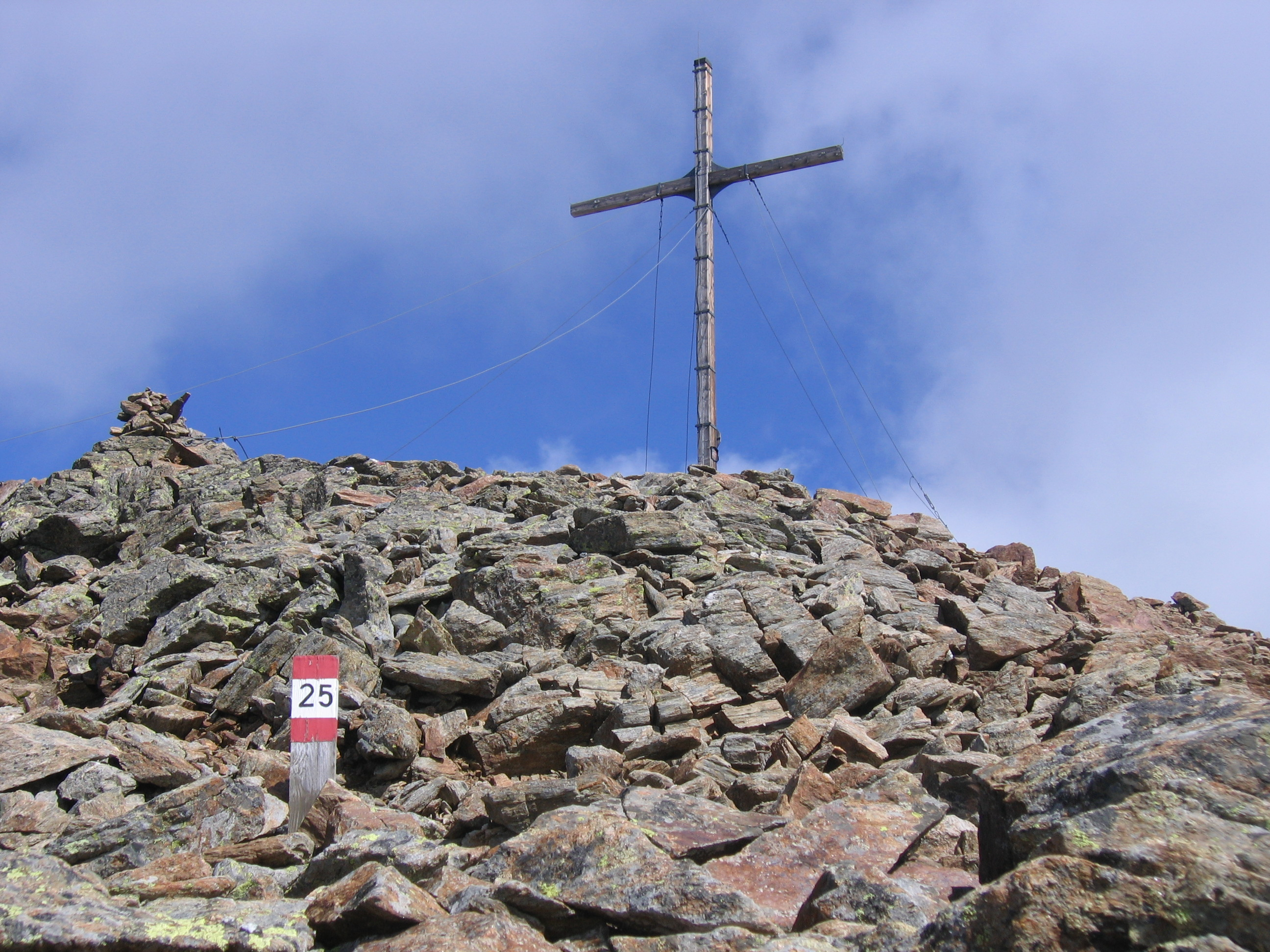
The summit cross on the Furgler

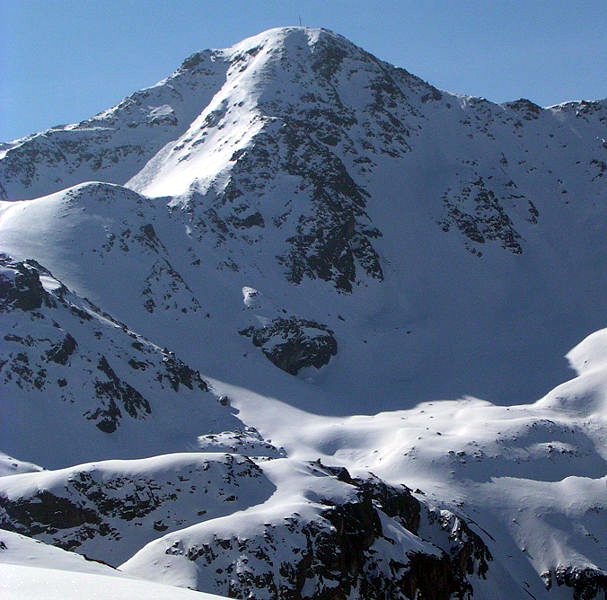
The Furgler in winter from the north

== Literature ==
- Paul Werner; Ludwig Thoma (1982), Deutscher Alpenverein; Österreichischer Alpenverein; Alpenverein Südtirol (eds.), Alpenvereinsführer Samnaungruppe (in German) (2 ed.), München: Rother, pp. 150–152, ISBN 3-7633-1241-2
