= Piz Rots =

Mountain in Switzerland

- Vesilspitze
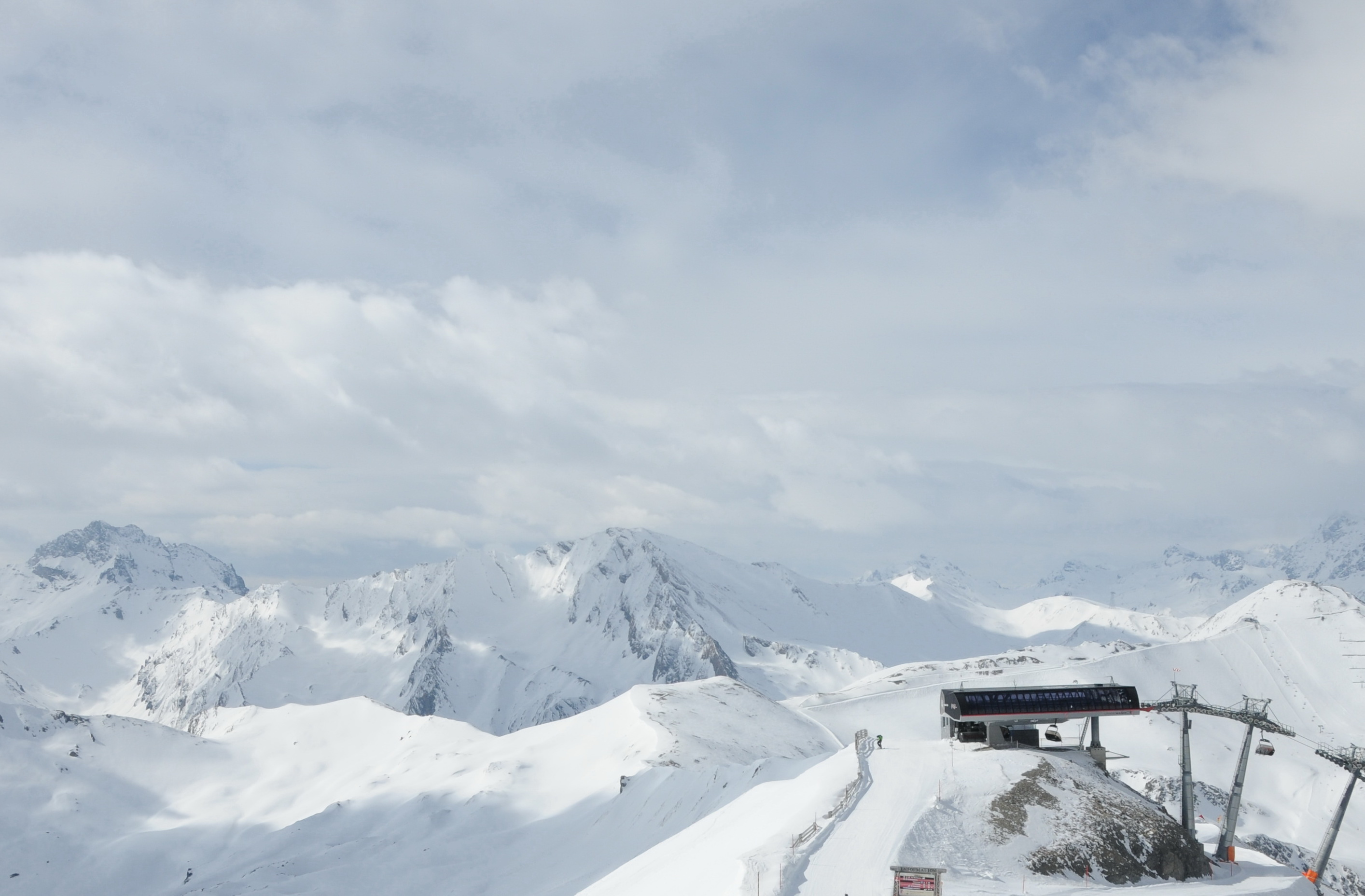
- Piz Rots in the middle

Highest point
- Elevation: 3,097 m (10,161 ft); Metres above the Sea (Switzerland)
- Prominence: 279 m (915 ft)
- Parent peak: Muttler
- Coordinates: 46°55′30.7″N 10°18′57.5″E

Geography
- Location within Alps
- Location: Graubünden, Switzerland/Tyrol, Austria
- Parent range: Samnaun Alps

Piz Rots (also known as Vesilspitze) is a mountain of the Samnaun Alps, located on the Austria–Switzerland border. It lies south-west of Samnaun.
