= Vnà =

Village in Graubünden, Switzerland

Coordinates: 46.8431°N 10.3628°E

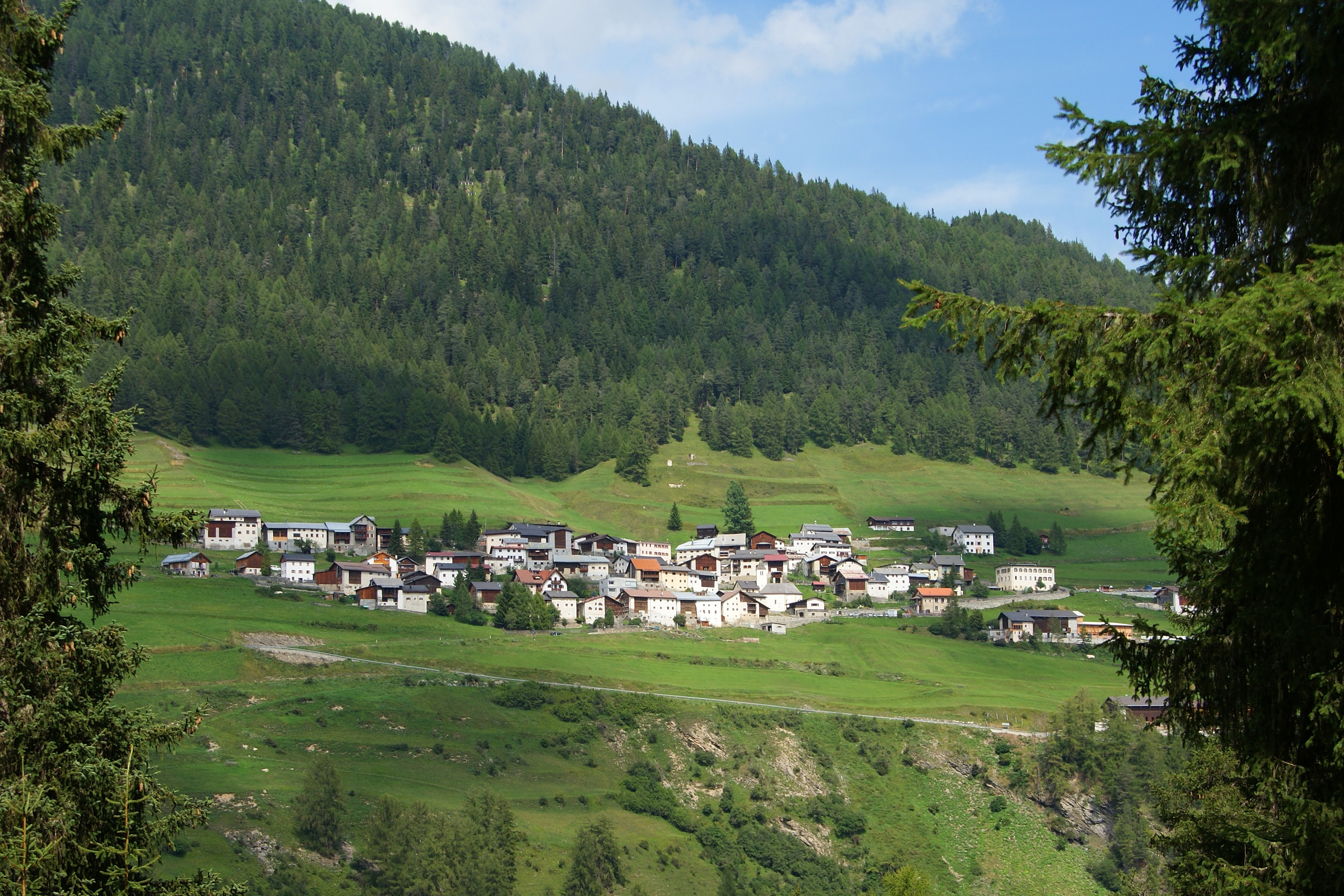
Vnà

Vnà is a village in the Lower Engadine in the Swiss canton of Graubünden, situated at 1,630 m above sea level. It is about 3 km from Ramosch and about 11 km from Scuol, the tourist center of the Lower Engadine.

In addition to several hiking trails into Val Sinestra, Zuort, Samnaun, or Griosch, the small village church and the village museum is worth seeing. The church was renovated from 1963 to 1965. The museum contains more than 400 works by artists and collectors.

== Vnà and surroundings photo gallery ==
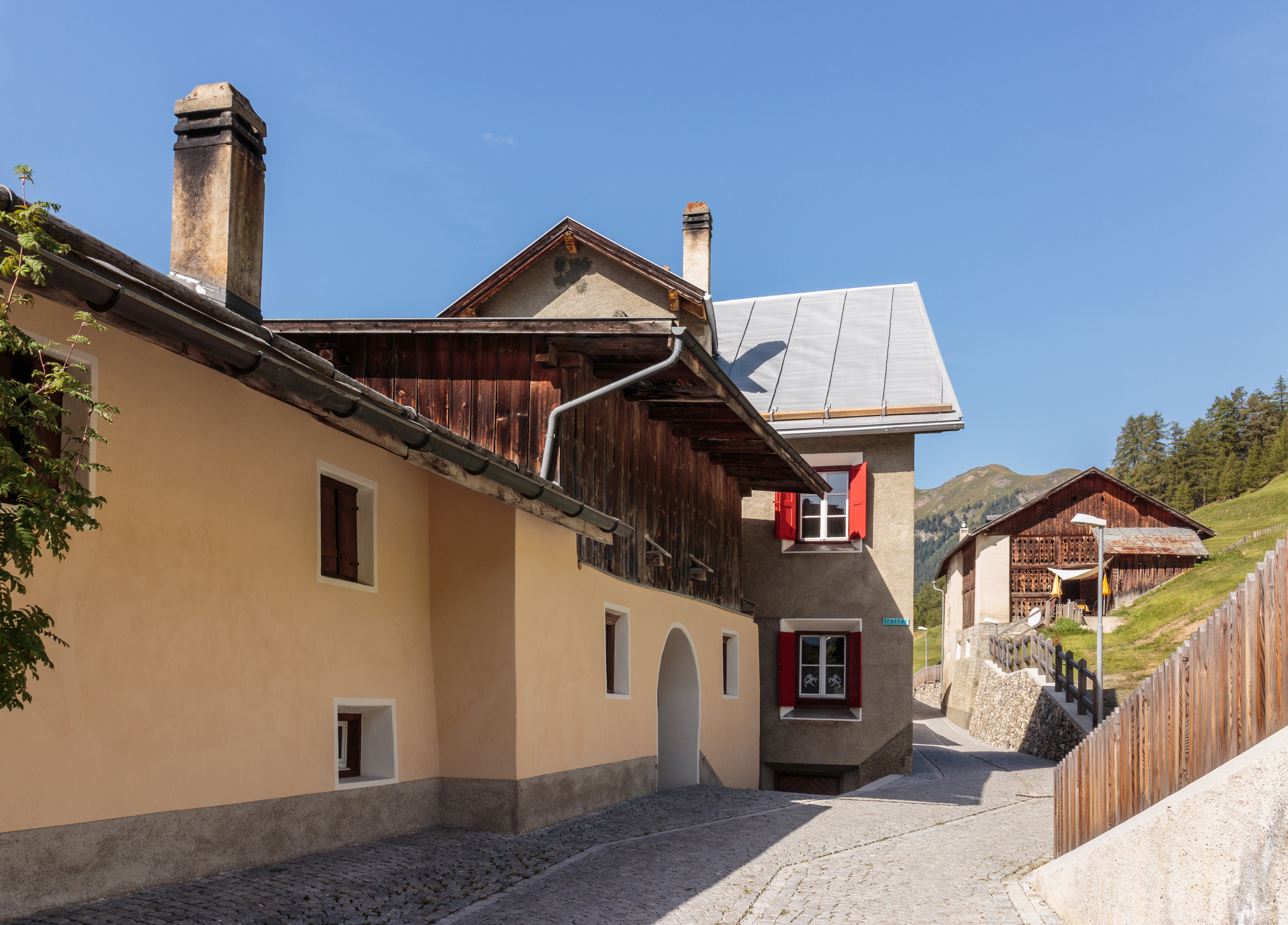
Plaz in Vnà.

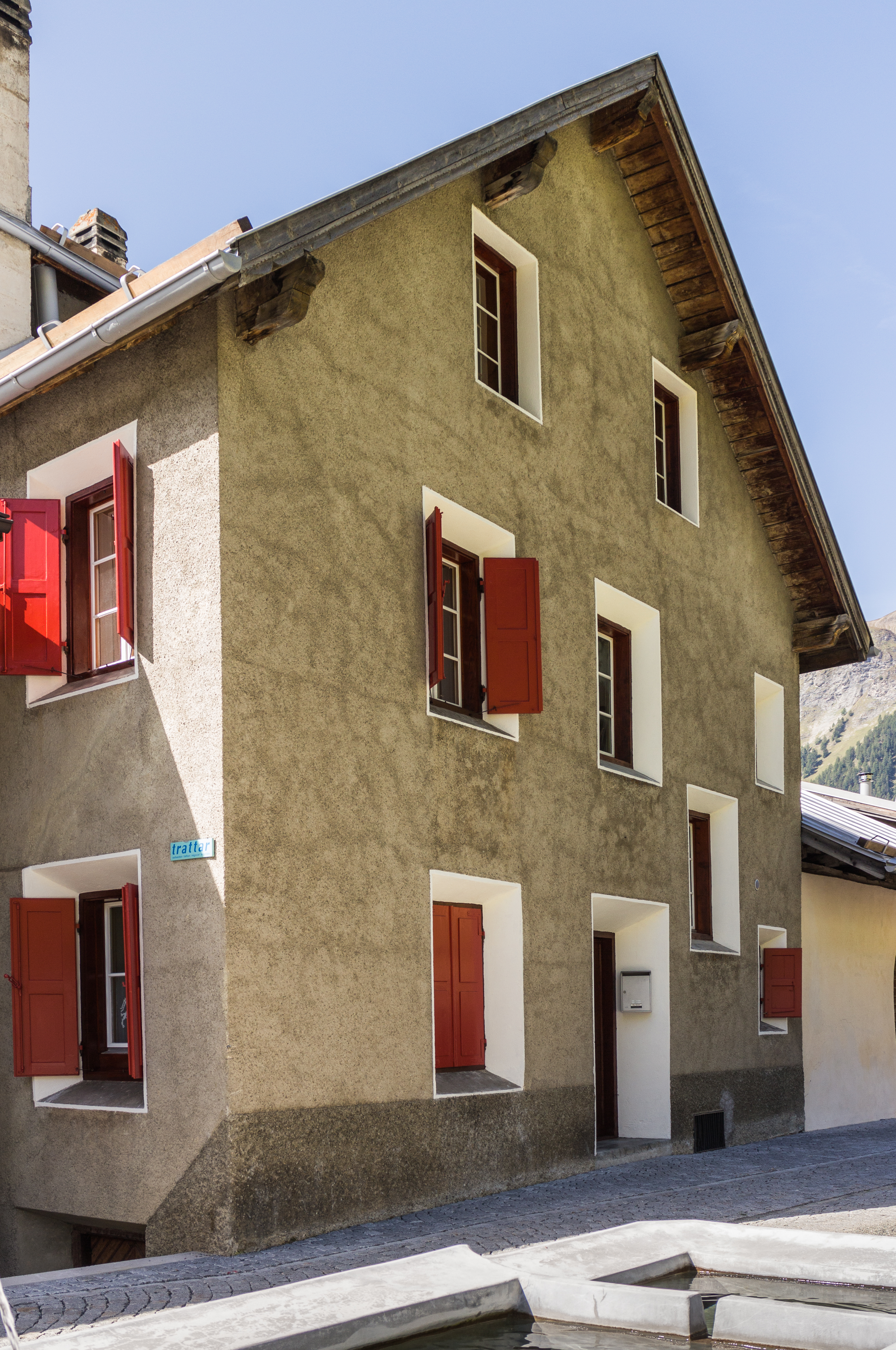
House on Plaz in Vnà.

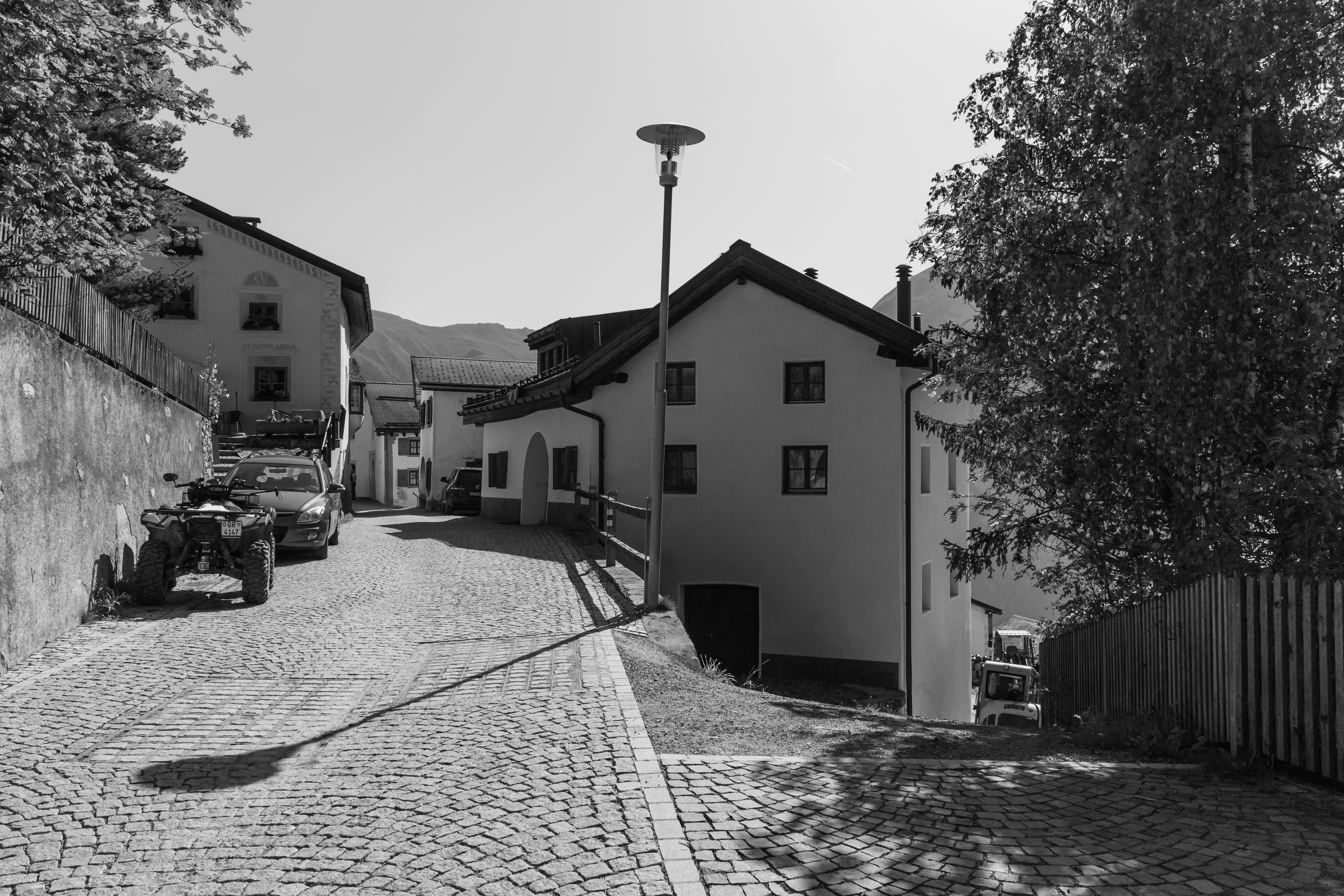
Plaz in Vnà.

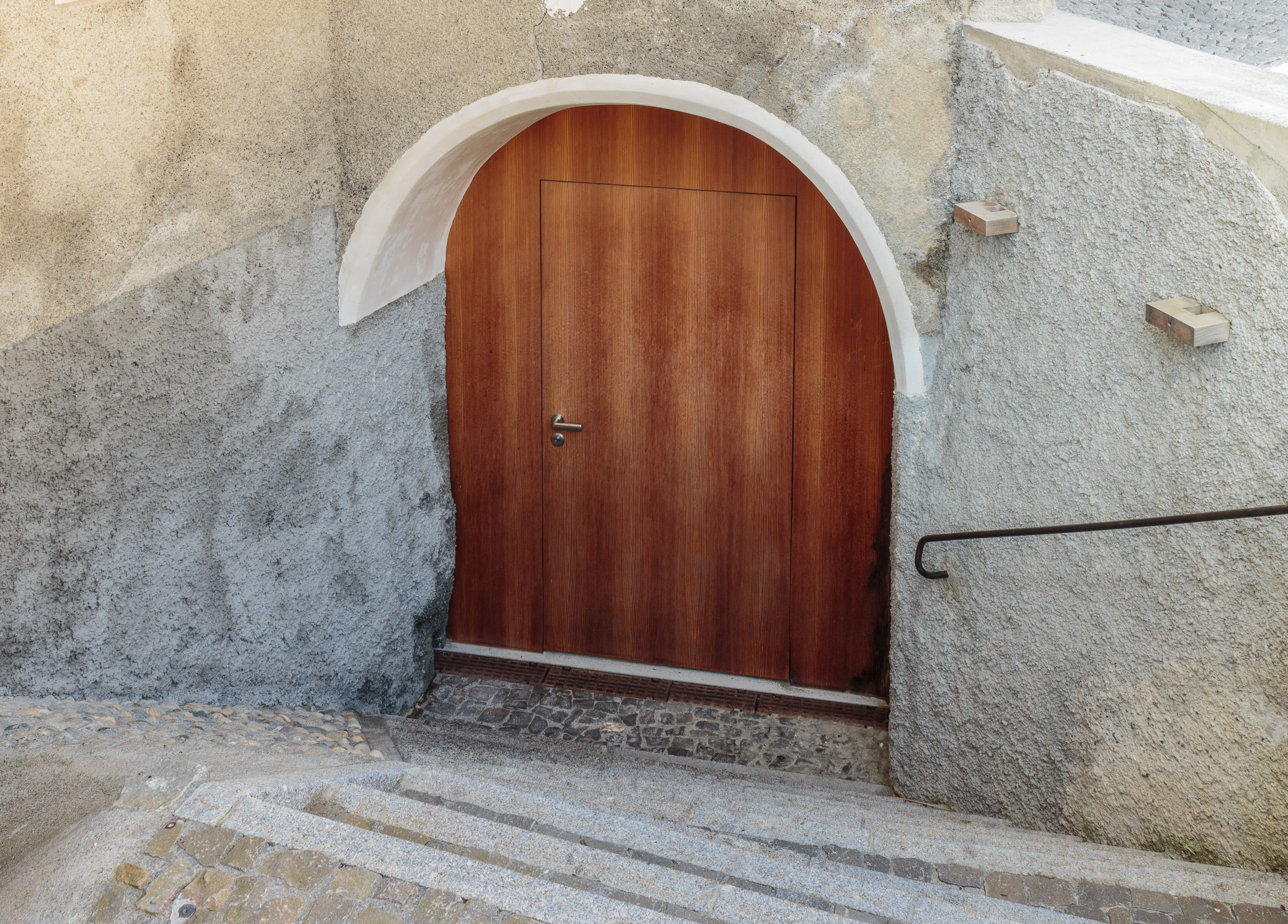
Old wooden door of a House on Plaz in Vnà.
