= Samnaun Alps =

Mountain range of the Central Eastern Alps

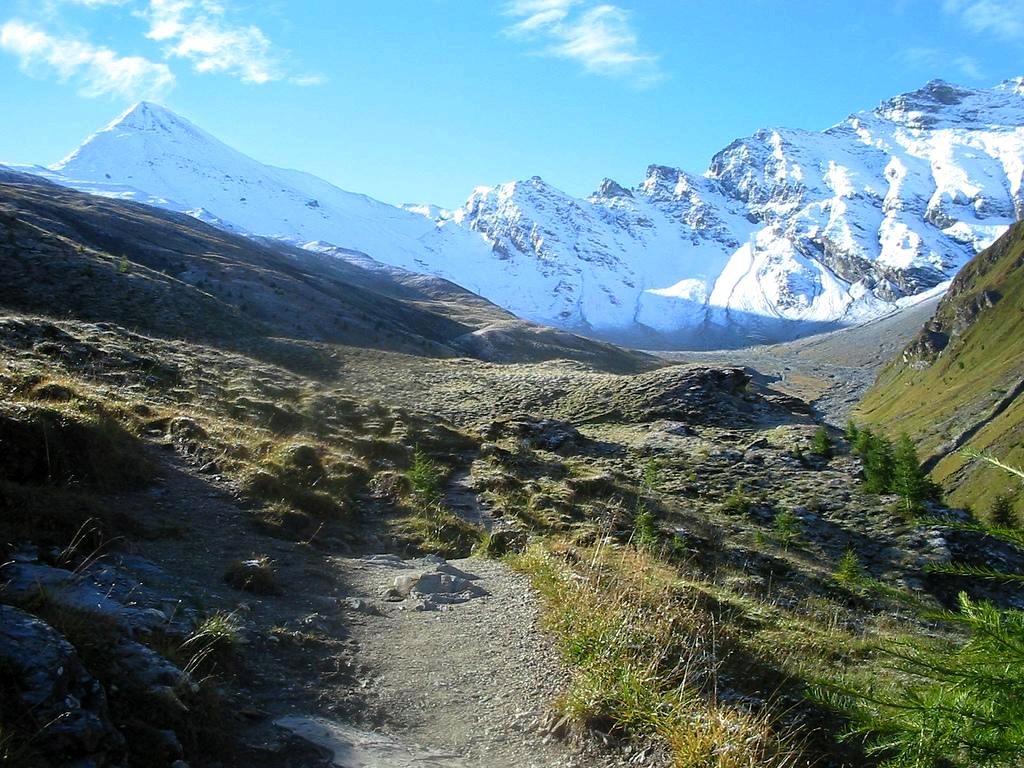
- Muttler (left) and Piz Tschütta (right)

Highest point
- Peak: Muttler
- Elevation: 3,293 m (10,804 ft)
- Coordinates: 46°54′1″N 10°22′42″E

Geography
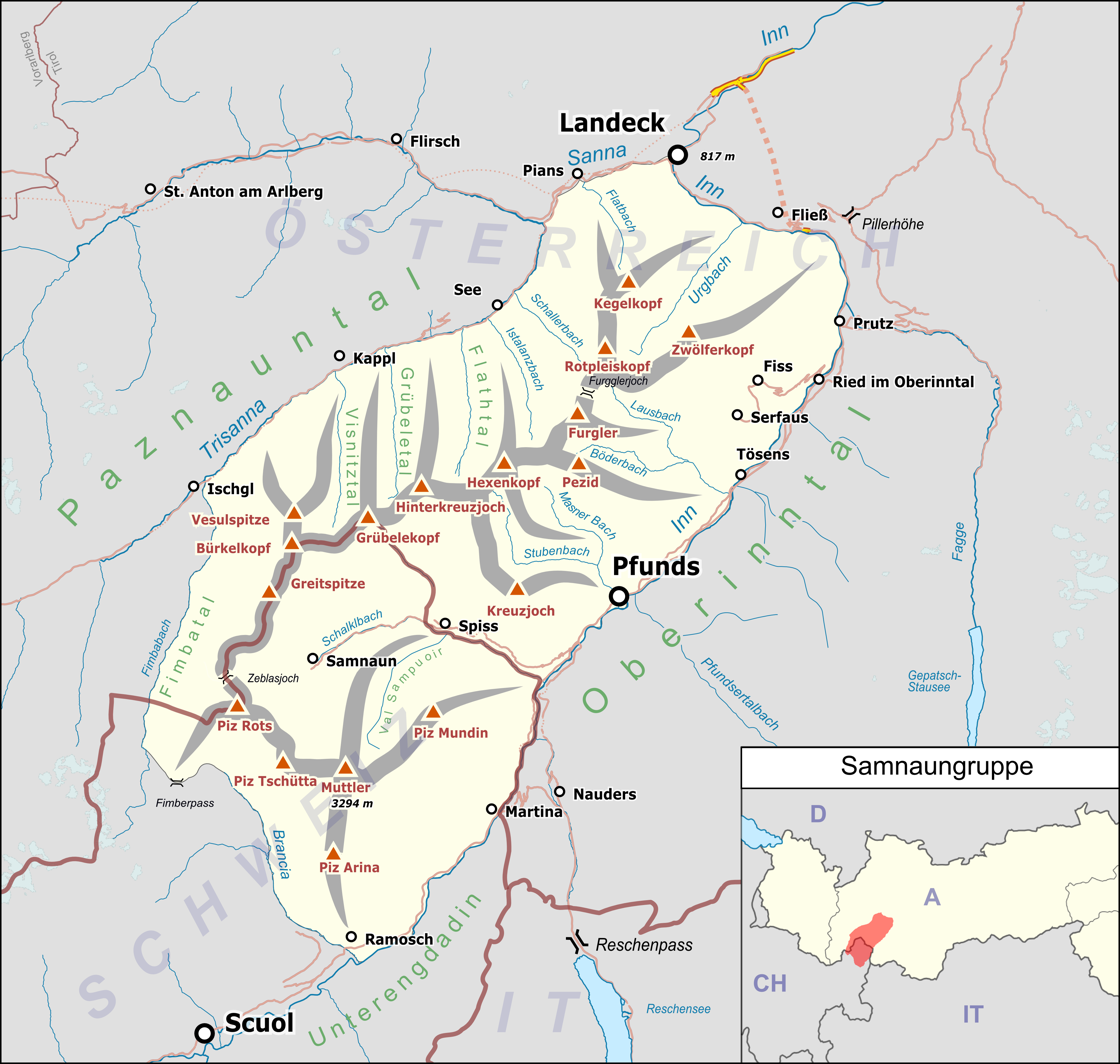
- Samnaun Alps; The borders of the range according to Alpine Club classification of the Eastern Alps
- Countries: Austria; Switzerland
- States: Tyrol; Graubünden
- Parent range: Central Eastern Alps
- Borders on: Verwall Alps; Silvretta; Sesvenna Range; Ötztal Alps

The Samnaun Alps are a mountain range of the Central Eastern Alps, named after the Swiss municipality of Samnaun. They are located at the border of the Austrian state of Tyrol and the Graubünden canton of Switzerland.

The Samnaun Alps are separated from the Sesvenna Alps in the south by the Engadine Valley; from the Silvretta Alps in the west by the Fimber Pass; from the Verwall Alps and the Lechtal Alps in the north by the Paznauntal; from the Ötztal Alps in the east by the Inn valley. All the range is drained by the river Inn, through the Trisanna, Schergenbach, Brancla and Fimbabach.

== Peaks ==
The range includes the following peaks:

Peak	Elevation (m/ft)	
Muttler	3293	10,804
Piz Tschütta	3258	10,689
Piz Mundin	3146	10,322
Vesilspitze	3115	10,220
Piz Rots	3097	10,161
Vesulspitze	3092	10,145
Hexenkopf	3038	9,968
Piz Malmurainza	3038	9,968
Bürkelkopf	3033	9,951
Gemspleiskopf	3017	9,899
Furgler	3004	9,856
Rothbleiskopf	2938	9,640
Flimspitz	2929	9610
Grübelekopf	2894	9495
Palinkopf	2864	9396

For a list of passes, see Passes of the Silvretta and Rätikon Ranges.

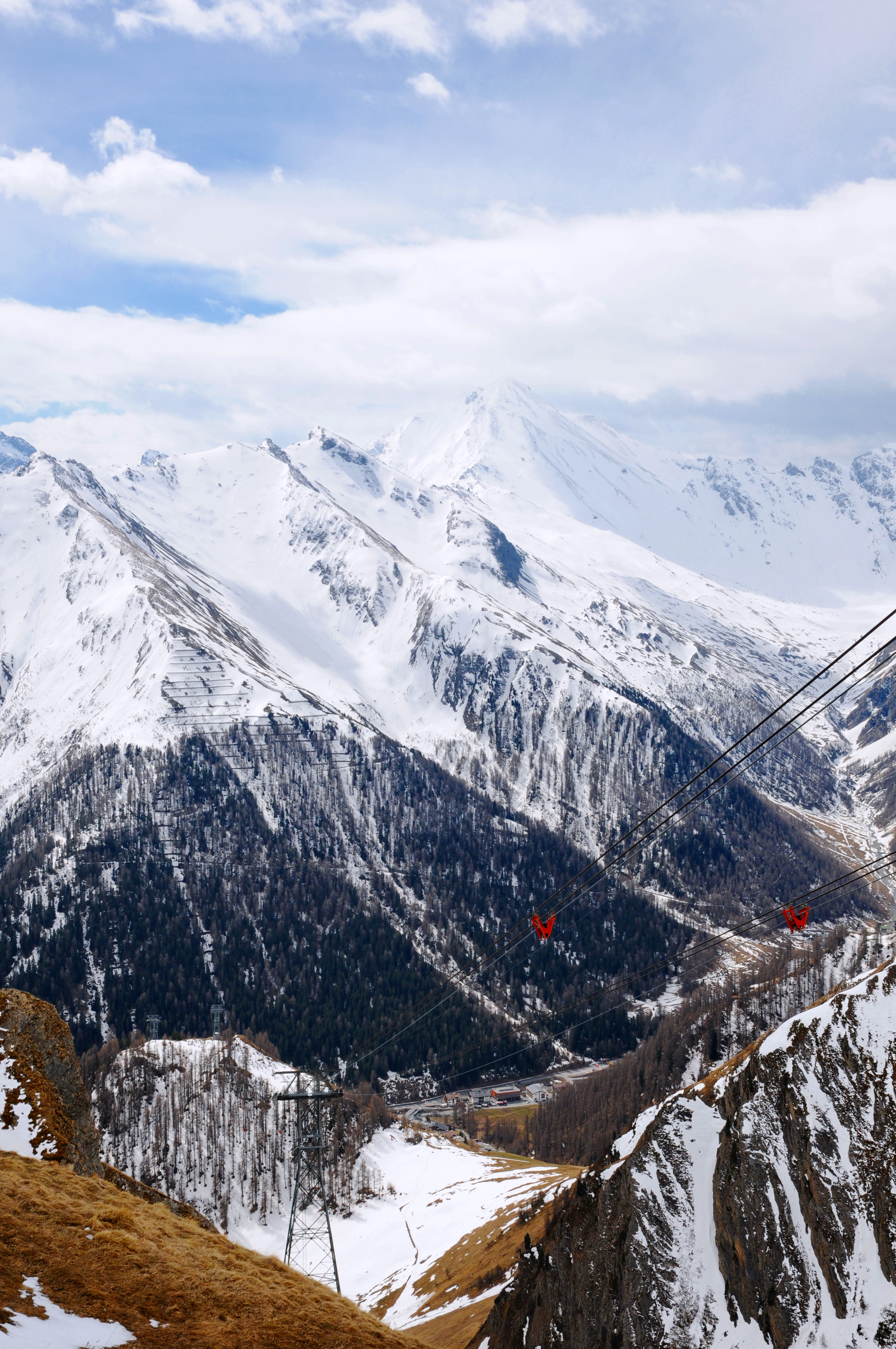
Muttler from north

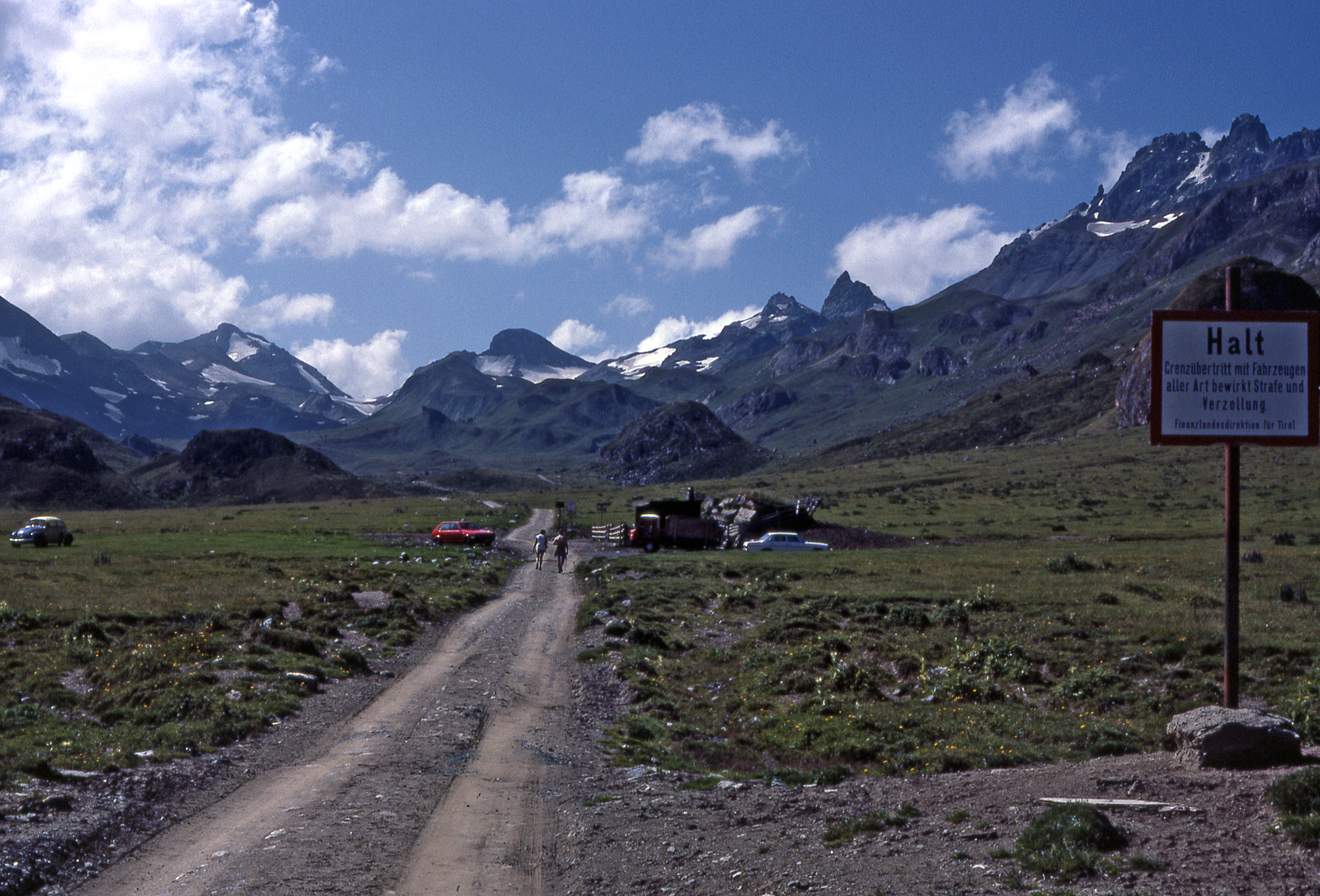
Fimbatal border crossing Switzerland and Austria

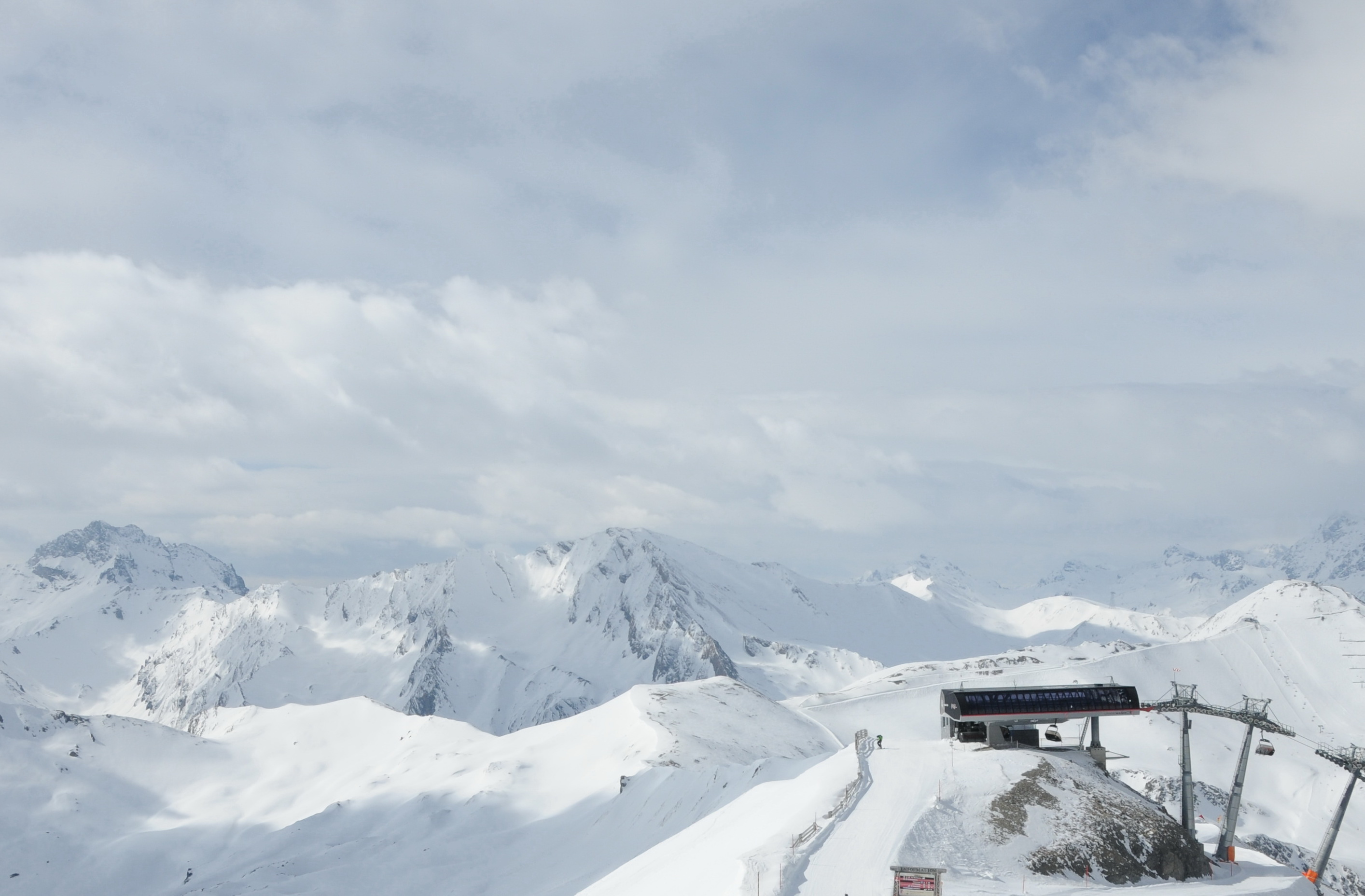
Piz Rots in the skiarea Silvretta Arena

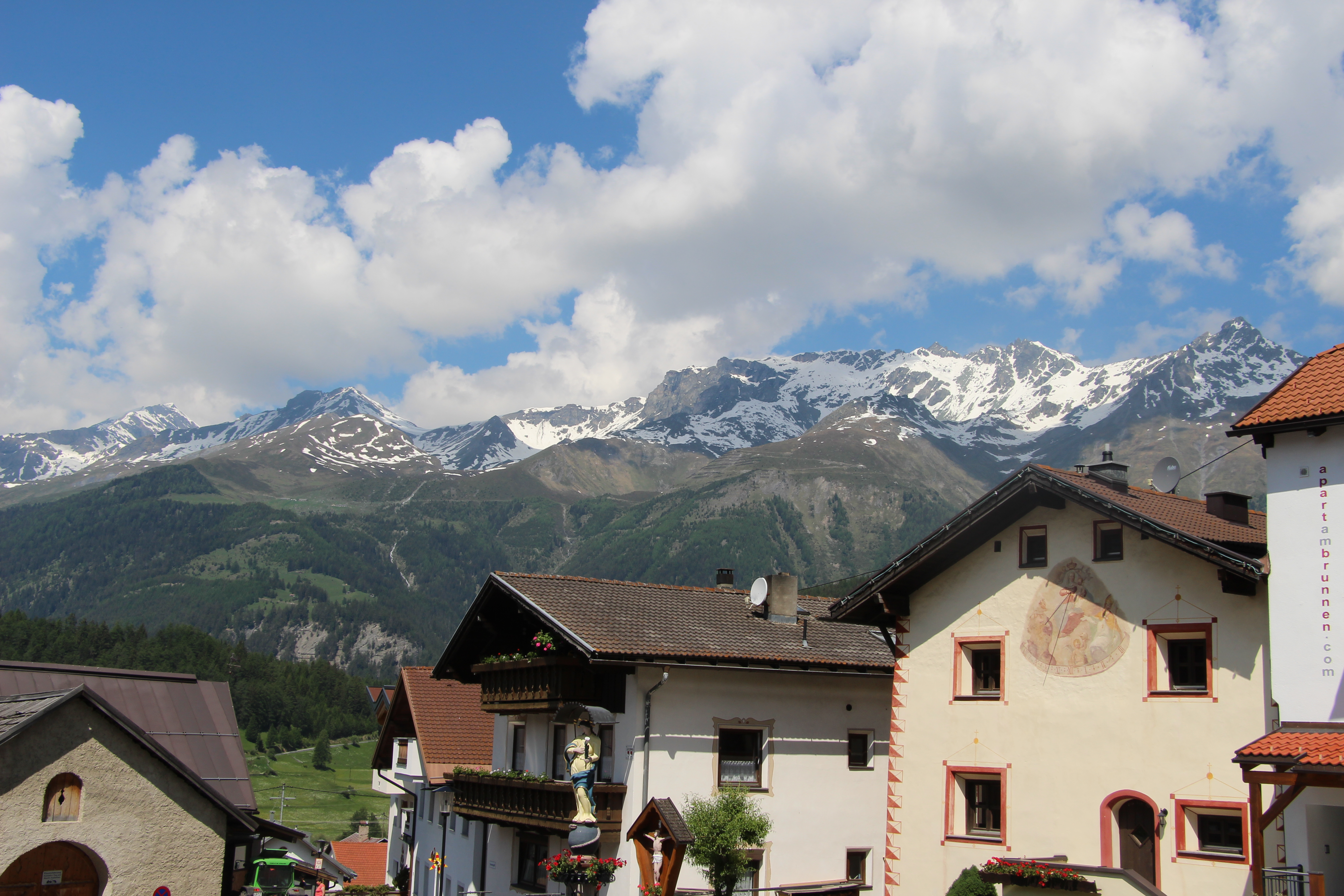
Piz Mundin and Muttler from east (Nauders)

== See also ==
- Swiss Alps
- List of mountains in Switzerland
