= Vesulspitze =

Mountain in Austria

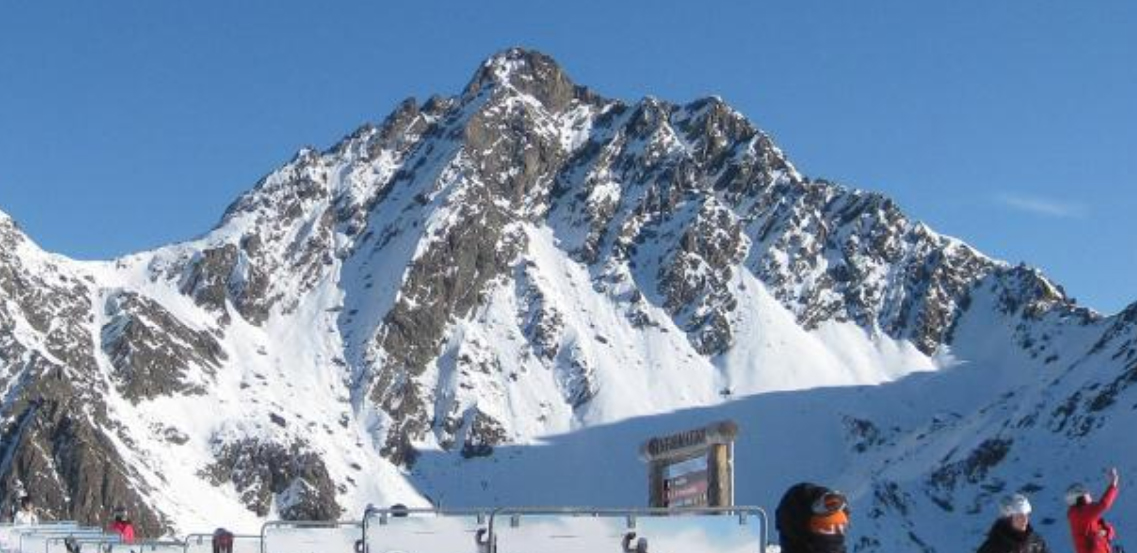
- View from the south-west side

Highest point
- Elevation: 3,089 m (10,135 ft)
- Prominence: 550 m (1,800 ft)
- Parent peak: Piz Linard
- Listing: Alpine mountains above 3000 m
- Coordinates: 47°00′6″N 10°20′56″E

Geography
- Location within Alps
- Location: Tyrol, Austria
- Parent range: Samnaun Alps

The Vesulspitze is a mountain of the Samnaun Alps, located near Ischgl in Austria. With an elevation of 3,089 metres above sea level, it is the highest summit of the Samnaun Alps north of the Zeblasjoch.
