= Muttler =

Mountain in Switzerland

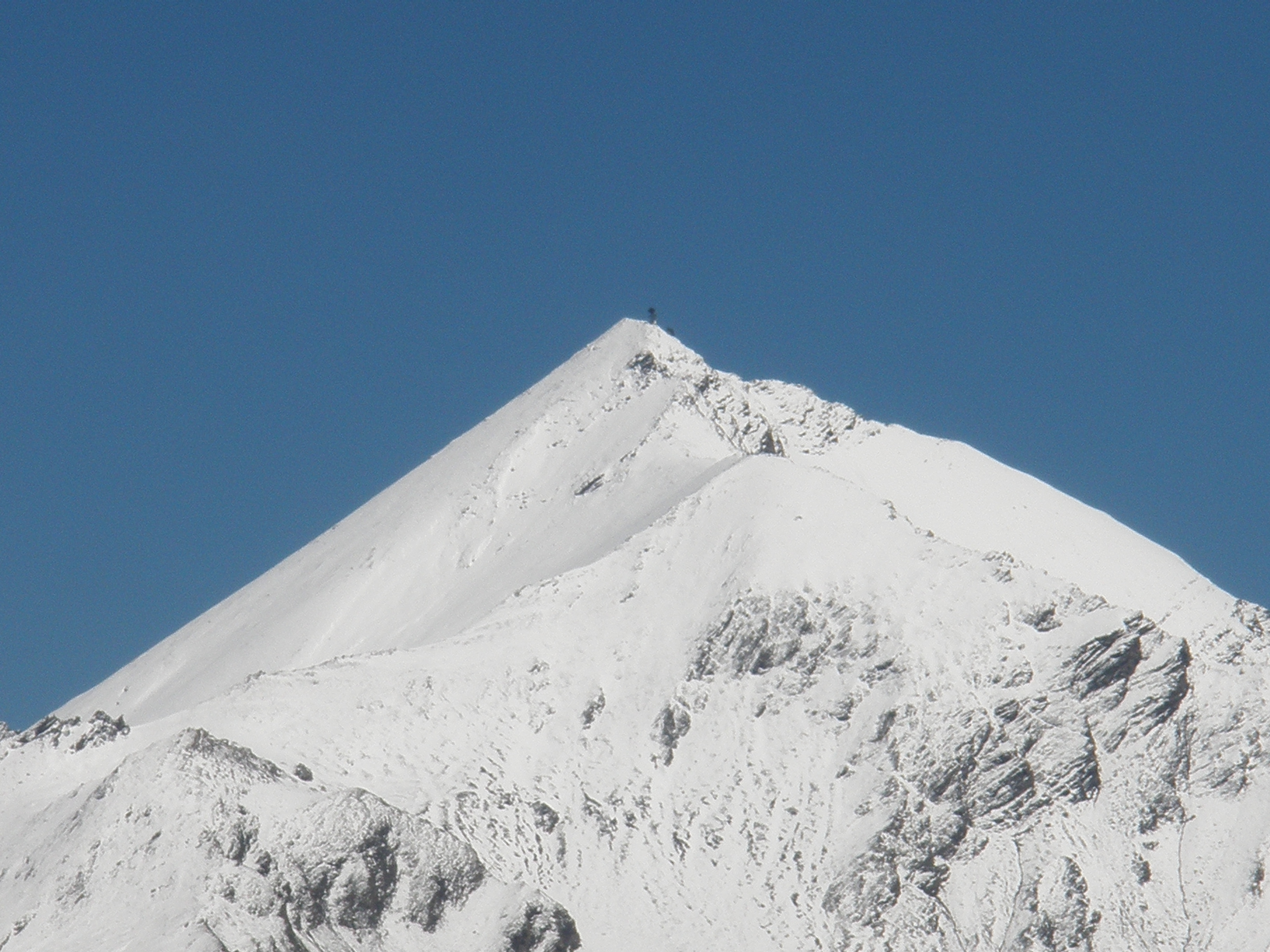

Highest point
- Elevation: 3,294 m (10,807 ft)
- Prominence: 703 m (2,306 ft)
- Parent peak: Piz Linard
- Isolation: 11.45 km (7.11 mi)
- Listing: Alpine mountains above 3000 m
- Coordinates: 46°54′02.3″N 10°22′43.4″E

Geography
- Location within Switzerland
- Location: Graubünden, Switzerland
- Parent range: Samnaun Alps

Climbing
- First ascent: 29 July 1859 by Johann Jakob Weilenmann
- Easiest route: Trail leading to the summit

The Muttler (3,296 m) is the highest mountain in the Samnaun Alps. It is located south of Samnaun in the Swiss canton of Graubünden. From 1972 - 2011 a transmitter was located west of the summit.

== See also ==
- List of mountains of Graubünden
- List of most isolated mountains of Switzerland
