= Serbian Military Cemetery, Vukovar =

Cemetery in eastern Croatia

Serbian Military Cemetery Aleja
- Interactive map of Serbian Military Cemetery; Aleja

Details
- Established: 1994
- Location: Vukovar
- Country: Croatia
- Coordinates: 45°20′41″N 19°00′06″E
- Type: military cemetery
- No. of graves: 26

The Serbian Military Cemetery (Serbian Cyrillic: Српско војничко гробље, Croatian: Srpsko vojničko groblje), also known as the Aleja lit. 'Alley' among local Serbs and Šajkača Cemetery among local Croats, is a small military cemetery in Vukovar, town in eastern Croatia. The cemetery was built in 1994 on a plot of land next to the Old Orthodox Cemetery. The cemetery commemorates 26 Serbian soldiers killed during the Battle of Vukovar in 1991.

Built at the time when the town was a part of the self-proclaimed Republic of Serbian Krajina, the cemetery became a topic of tense debates between the local Serb community and representatives and Croat returnees after the end of the United Nations-led UNTAES transitional administration, in big part due to the shape of memorials which resembled šajkača hats of Serb soldiers or paramilitaries. At the time, there were proposals to relocate the cemetery at another location due to unresolved land issues with 17 private properties being used for the cemetery, yet until 2010 owners of 14 parcels accepted financial compensation for their property. In 2001 the Joint Council of Municipalities together with the Independent Democratic Serb Party issued a statement after the 7th case of vandalization of the location in which it condemned the absence of the official reaction from the authorities. After repeated vandalization, in 2002 Serb community decided to reshape all 26 memorials into standardized shape without šajkača on top which led to significant decrease in intercomunal tensions over the location.

Local Serb community organizations and institutions together with representatives from the Consulate General of Serbia in Vukovar each year in early September commemorate war victims with the Orthodox liturgy at the nearby Church of St. Nicholas and at the military cemetery.

== See also ==
- National Memorial Cemetery of The Victims of Homeland War in Vukovar
- Dudik Memorial Park
- Jewish Cemetery of Vukovar
- Bulgarian Military Cemetery, Vukovar
