= Ravnikar =

Ravnikar is a Slovene surname. Notable people with the surname include:

- Dijana Ravnikar (born 1978), Slovene biathlete and skier
- Edvard Ravnikar (1907–1993), Slovene architect
- Majda Širca Ravnikar (born 1953), Slovene politician
- Vojteh Ravnikar (1943–2010), Slovene architect and journalist
- Žiga Ravnikar (born 1999), Slovene archer
