= International Piranesi Award =

Award for architecture

Piranesi Award
- Description: Award for architectural projects from Central Europe and the Balkans
- Country: Slovenia
- Presented by: Piran Days of Architecture international conference
- First award: 1989
- Final award: 2024
- Current recipient: Vidic Grohar Arhitekti (2024)
- Website: www.pida.si/en/piranesi-award

The International Piranesi Award, is an award for architectural projects that were created in Central Europe and the Balkans.

Started in 1989, the Piranesi Award is given out at the Piran Days of Architecture international conference in Piran, Slovenia. It was named after Giovanni Battista Piranesi. Participating countries include Austria, the Czech Republic, Greece, Croatia, Italy, Hungary, Slovakia, Slovenia, Serbia (joined in 2018), Bosnia and Herzegovina (joined in 2019), and Montenegro (joined in 2020).

== Main award ==
The projects presented at the Piranesi exhibition, are selected and nominated at the end of October by the national selectors of the participating countries. Each selector can propose five projects. Fifty-five architectural realizations and 42 student projects compete for the award.

The prestigious Piranesi Award, two Piranesi Honorary Mentions, and the one Piranesi Student Honorary Mention are selected by an international jury consisting of annual PDA conferencing lecturers and conferred by the honorary sponsor of the PDA Conference.

In 1989, Bogdan Bogdanović received the first Piranesi award for the Dudik Memorial Park in Vukovar, Croatia.

=== Recipients ===
- 1989 Bogdan Bogdanović, Yugoslavia for Dudik Memorial Park, Vukovar, 1978–1980
- 1990 Vojteh Ravnikar, Slovenia for Resljeva apartment building, Ljubljana
- 1991 Gino Valle, Italy for office building Bergamin, Portogruaro
- 1992 Klaus Kada, Austria for Student residence WIST, Graz, 1989
- 1993 Much Untertrifaller, Gerhard Hörburger, Austria for Silvrettahaus, Bielerhöhe Pass
- 1994 Roberto Pirzio Biroli with Sandra Martincich, and Maddalena Pandolfi, Italy for Parco Botanico Friulano "Cormor", 1990–93
- 1995 Hans Peter Wörndl, Austria for "Gucklhupf", Mondsee, 1992–93
- 1996 Michelle Cannatà, Italy and Fátima Fernandez, Portugal for Piazza N. Green
- 1997 Dieter Henke and Marta Schreieck, Austria for the Bruno Kreisky School, Vienna
- 1998 Urša Komac and Špela Kuhar, Slovenia for rest areas on the Kras cycling path
- 1999 Sadar + Vuga, Slovenia for Chamber of Commerce and Industry of Slovenia, Ljubljana
- 2000 Aleš Vodopivec, Slovenia for parting hall and service buildings of the Srebrniče Cemetery, Novo Mesto
- 2001 Cino Zucchi, Italy for the plan for the Former Junghans Factory, Giudecca, Venice
- 2002 Nicholas Dodd, Tadej Glažar, Vasa J. Perović, Arne Vehovar, and Ana Kučan, Slovenia for Primary School Ob Rinži, Kočevje
- 2003 Miha Kajzelj, Slovenia for Shelter, Kobariški Stol
- 2004 Miha Klinar, Špela Kuhar, Blaž Medja, Uroš Pavasovič, Robert Potokar, Slovenia for Unified memorial posts for hidden burial ground in Slovenia
- 2005 Idis Turato, Saša Randić, Croatia for Primary school Fran Krsto Frankopan, island Krk
- 2006 Enota, Dean Lah, Milan Tomac, Slovenia for Hotel Sotelia in spa Olimia, Olimje
- 2007 Studio Njirić+Arhitekti, Croatia for Kindergarten Sunce-Retkovec, Zagreb
- 2008 Ján Studený, Martin Vojta, Slovakia for Family house in Černošice, CZ
- 2009 Deca Architecture, Greece for Aloni house in Antiparos
- 2010 Maruša Zorec, Matjaž Bolčina, Slovenia for The manor Naskov dvorec, Maribor, 2009
- 2011 Marte.Marte Architekten, Austria for Aflenzbrücke, Lorüns, 2010
- 2012 Bernardo Bader, Austria for Islamic cemetery, Altach, 2011
- 2013 Modus, Sandy Attia, Matteo Scagnol, Italy for Ring road, Bressanone, 2012
- 2014 Péter Gereben, Balázs Marián, Hungary for Wine terrace and spa, Eger, Almagyar
- 2015 Dinko Peračić, Croatia for Market and fish market, Vodice
- 2016 Maruša Zorec, Maša Živec, Matjaž Bolčina, Slovenia for Renovation of Plečnik's house in Ljubljana, 2015
- 2017 Bernardo Bader, Austria for Chapel Salgenreute Krumbach, 2016
- 2018 Francesca Torzo for Galerie n09 – z33, Hasselt, Belgium, 2018
- 2019 Bevk Perović Architects for New Gallery and Kasemattes, Neue Bastei, Wiener Neustadt, Austria, 2019
- 2021 Építész Stúdió, Hungary for Szent Gellért Sport and Event Hall, Saint Margaret High School, Budapest, 2020
- 2022 Medprostor, Slovenia for Covering the Remains of the Church of St. John the Baptist in Žiče Charterhouse with a temporary lapidary, Žiče Charterhouse, 2022
- 2023 Elementarna, Slovenia for Revitalization of Old Glassworks and Surrounding Urban Areas, Ptuj, 2023
- 2024 Vidic Grohar Arhitekti, Slovenia for Temporary spaces of the Slovene National Drama Theatre, Ljubljana, 2024

=== Gallery ===
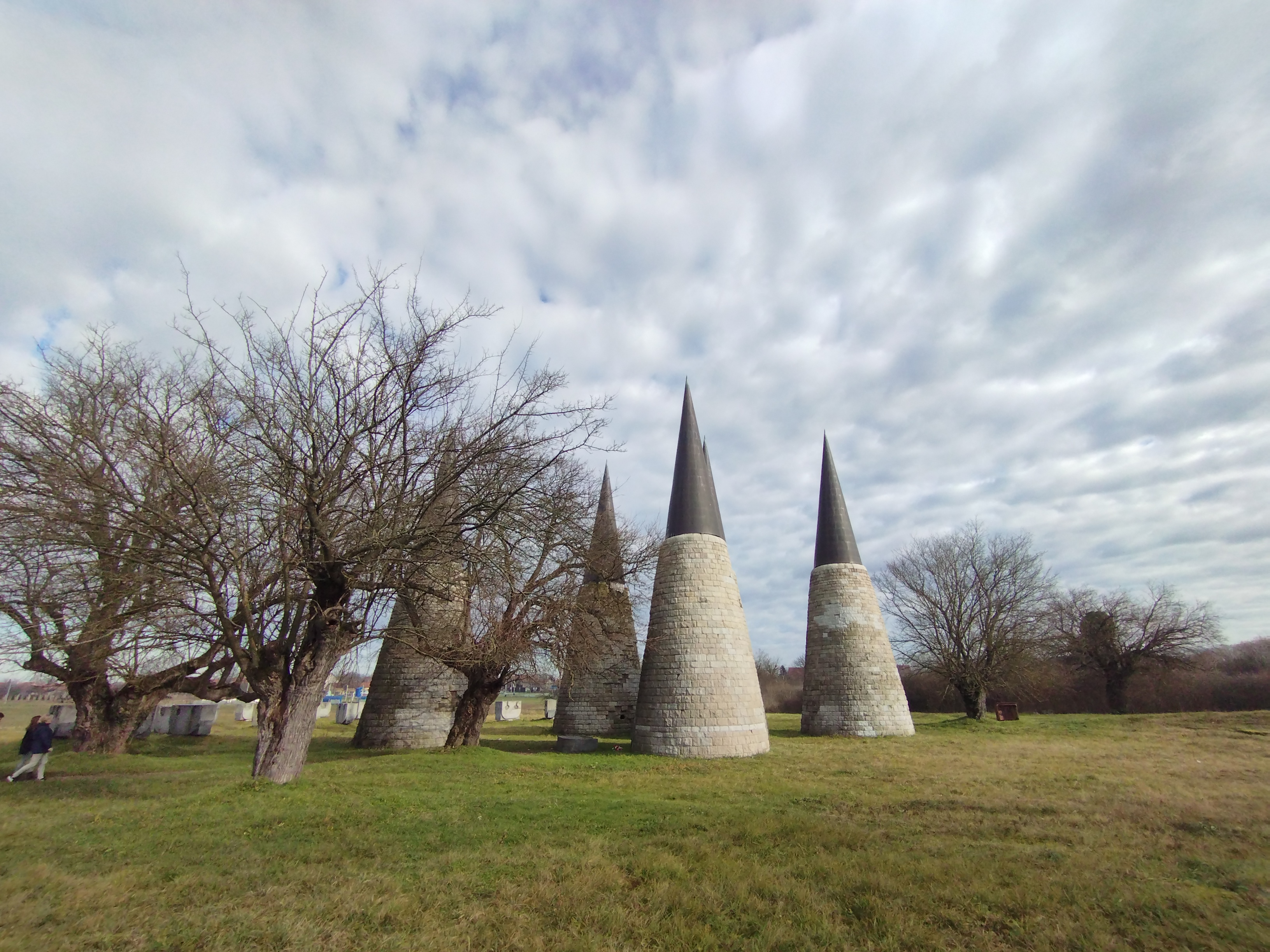
Monument at the Dudik Memorial Park by Bogdan Bogdanović

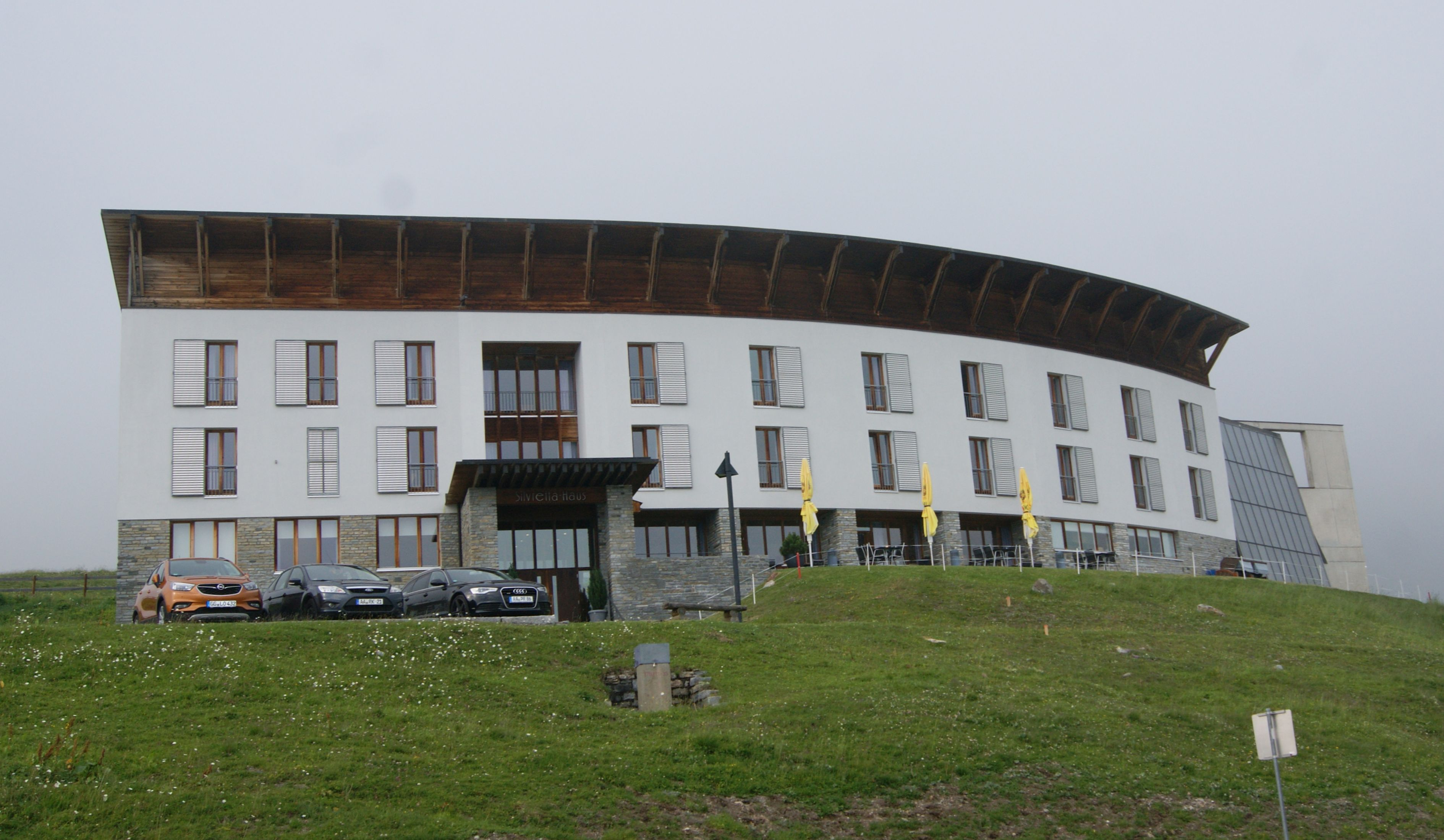
Silvrettahaus, Bielerhöhe Pass

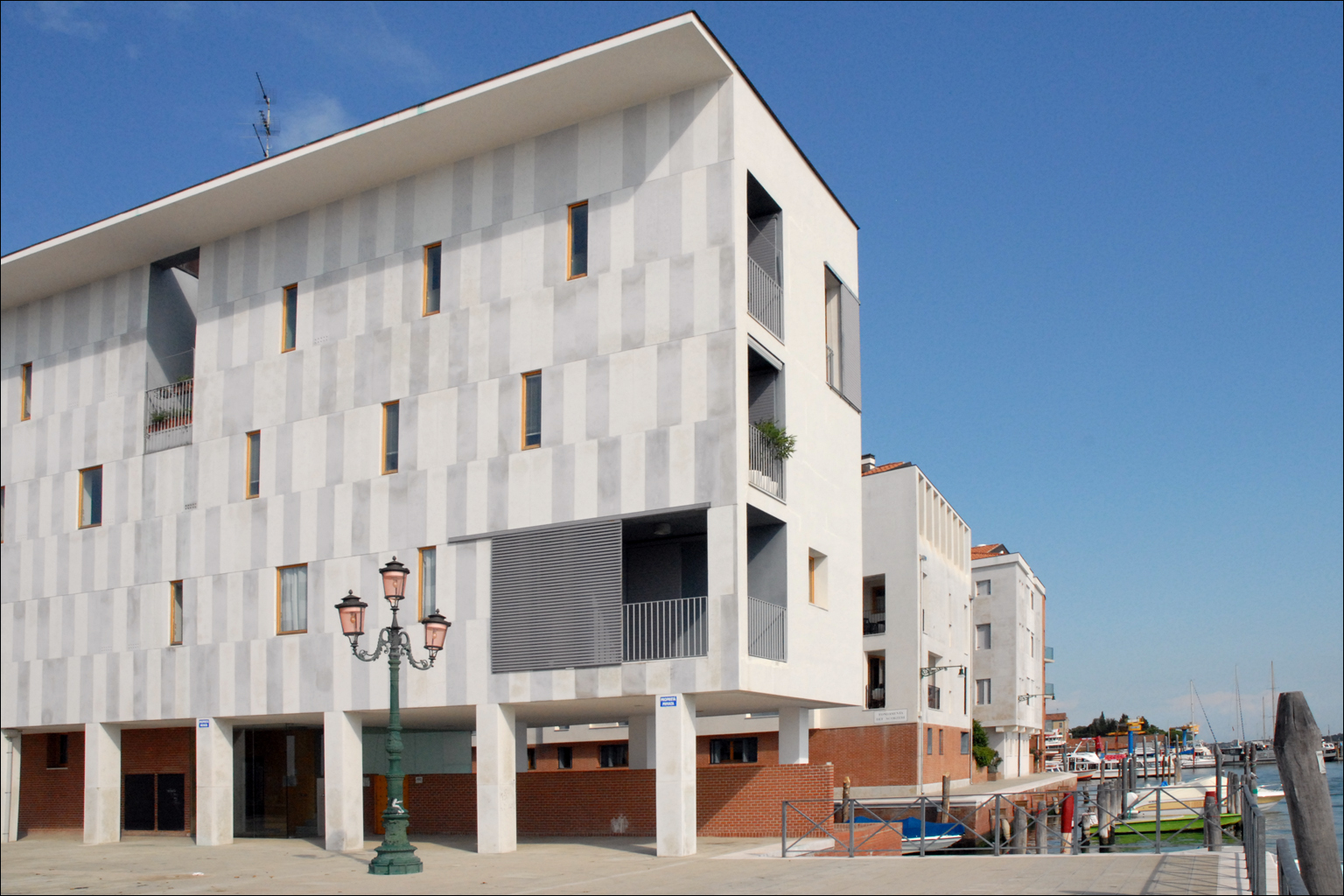
Former Junghans Factory, Giudecca, Venice

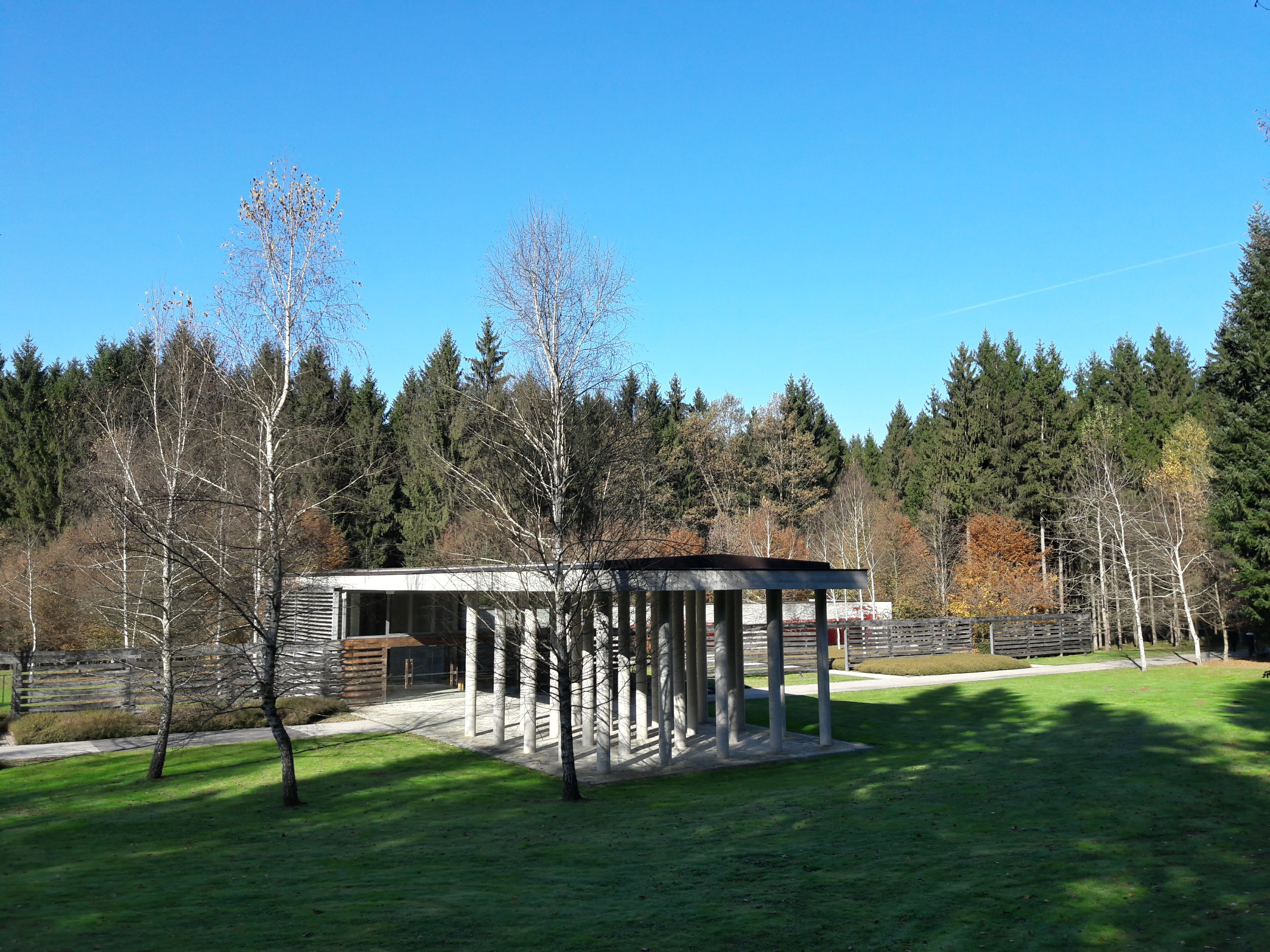
Srebrniče Cemetery

== Student award ==
The Piranesi conference also includes an international student exhibition, held since 2008, with awards. Twenty-one European architectural faculties participate: Graz, Spittal, Vienna, Banja Luka, Mostar, Sarajevo, Split, Zagreb, Thessaloniki, Budapest, Pescara, Trieste, Podgorica, Bratislava, Ljubljana, Maribor, Belgrade, Novi Sad, Kragujevac, the Architectural Association in London, the Liechtenstein School of Architecture, and the Lucerne University of Applied Sciences and Arts. Each faculty nominates two student projects designed in the last two academic years.
