= Bulgarian Military Cemetery, Vukovar =

Cemetery in eastern Croatia

Bulgarian Military Cemetery
- Interactive map of Bulgarian Military Cemetery

Details
- Established: 1944–1945
- Location: Vukovar
- Country: Croatia
- Coordinates: 45.3307°N 19.0390°E
- Type: military cemetery
- No. of graves: 1,027

The Bulgarian Military Cemetery (Croatian: Bugarsko vojno groblje, Bulgarian: Българско военно гробище, Serbian Cyrillic: Бугарско војно гробље) is a military cemetery in Vukovar, a town in eastern Croatia. It commemorates 1,027 Bulgarian soldiers and officers killed during the liberation of the town from fascism in 1944 at the final stage of the World War II in Yugoslavia. The grave contains the remains of soldiers from the 1st Bulgarian Army which held the Syrmia Front line from Sotin to Grabovo, Berak and Orolik in late 1944.

It is located southeast of the city, adjacent to the New Cemetery of Dubrava.

== History ==
The cemetery was first marked in 1965 and suffered damage during the Croatian War of Independence. In 1999, after the end of UNTAES mission in the region, it was commemorated with a plaque, and in 2002, it underwent restoration. Commemorative ceremonies, organized by the Bulgarian Ministry of Defence and the Union of War Veterans of Bulgaria, are held regularly at the site. During his official state visit to Croatia, Bulgarian Defence Minister Nikolay Nenchev visited the cemetery in Vukovar. On that occasion Nenchev highlighted that approximately 10,700 Bulgarian soldiers lost their lives in Croatia, Serbia and North Macedonia while fighting against Nazism far from their homeland.

== See also ==
- National Memorial Cemetery of The Victims of Homeland War in Vukovar
- Serbian Military Cemetery, Vukovar
- Dudik Memorial Park
- Jewish Cemetery of Vukovar
- Bulgaria–Croatia relations
