= Parco Botanico Friulano "Cormor" =

Municipal park and botanical garden in Udine, Italy

Coordinates: 46°05′01″N 13°11′25″E

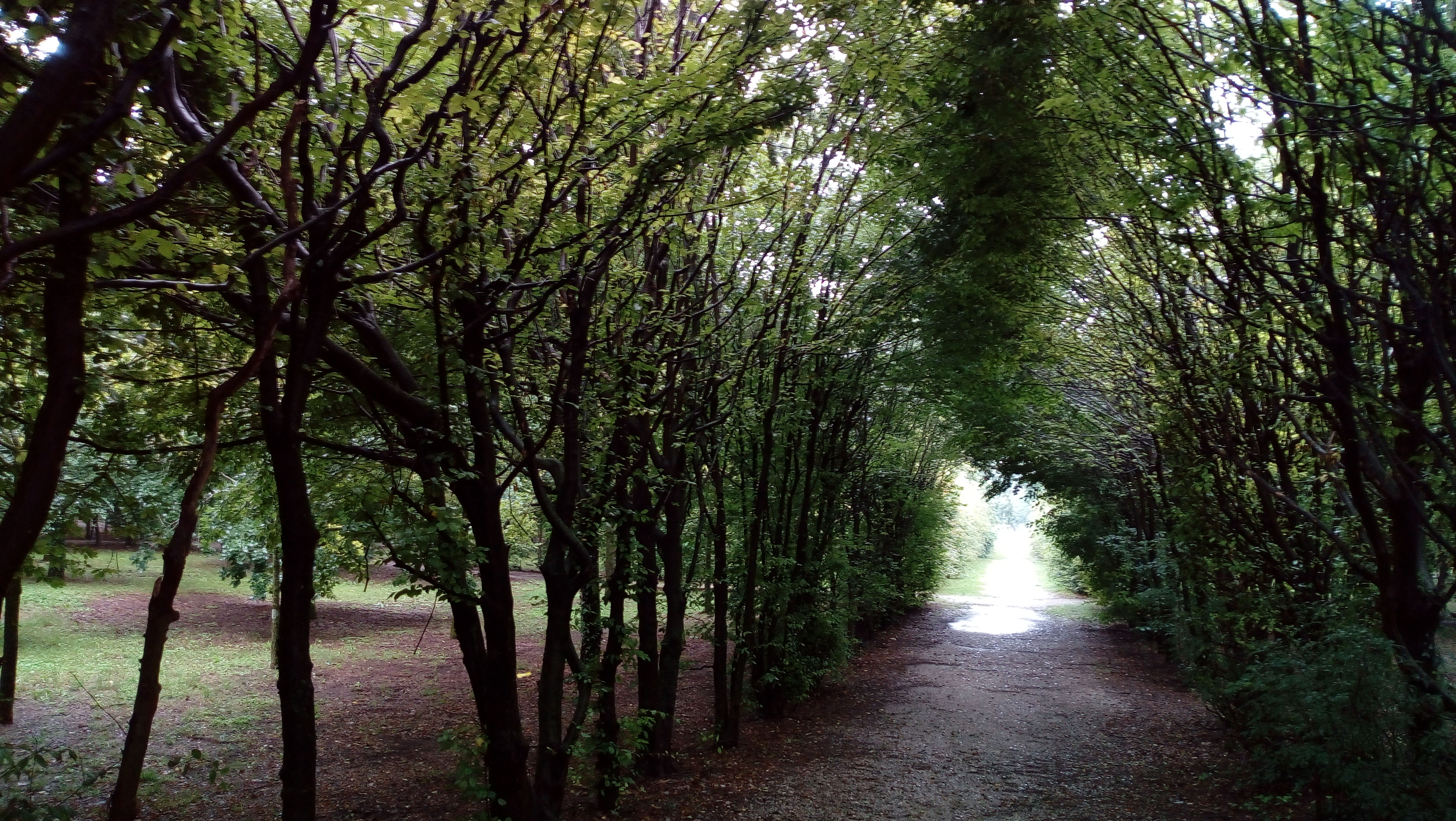
The entrance at north-east

The Parco Botanico Friulano "Cormor", also known as the Parco del Cormor or Parco Botanico del Cormôr, is a municipal park and botanical garden located in Udine, Friuli, Italy.

The park was created 1990–93 by architect Roberto Pirzio Biroli, for which he won the International Piranesi Award, on a neglected site northwest of the town center. It covers 30 hectares between the Cormôr torrent and the Autostrada Alpe-Adria (A23), with dense plantings of woodland, open lawns, a belvedere, paths and small roads, and a children's play area.

== See also ==
- List of botanical gardens in Italy
