= Izrael Scher =

Rabbi Izrael Scher Dr.

Personal life
- Born: 1901
- Died: 1941 (aged 39–40) Jasenovac, Independent State of Croatia
- Spouse: Klara Scher

Religious life
- Religion: Judaism
- Denomination: Judaism
- Synagogue: Vukovar Synagogue
- Position: Rabbi
- Ended: 1941

Izrael Scher (1901 – July 1941) also known as Izidor Šer was the rabbi of the Vukovar Synagogue.

== Biography ==
With the arrival of the Nazi army and the establishment of the Independent State of Croatia, the Vukovar Synagogue, of which Scher was then the rabbi, was looted and dilapidated. Shortly before 1941, the treasures of the synagogue (the Torah, prayer books, candelabra, etc.) were placed in two boxes and buried in the cellar. They were found and looted, but it remains unclear who took them and whether they were taken in 1941, 1945, or later. All the Jews from the Vukovar Jewish community (numbering about 500) were deported to extermination camps by the Ustashe, the only WW2 quisling force who operated their own extermination camps, with many ending up in Jasenovac. Nearly all of them were killed. Among them were Rabbi Scher and his wife, Klara (born 1906), both Doctors. They were murdered by the Ustashe at the Jasenovac concentration camp in July 1941.
