= Bulgaria–Croatia relations =

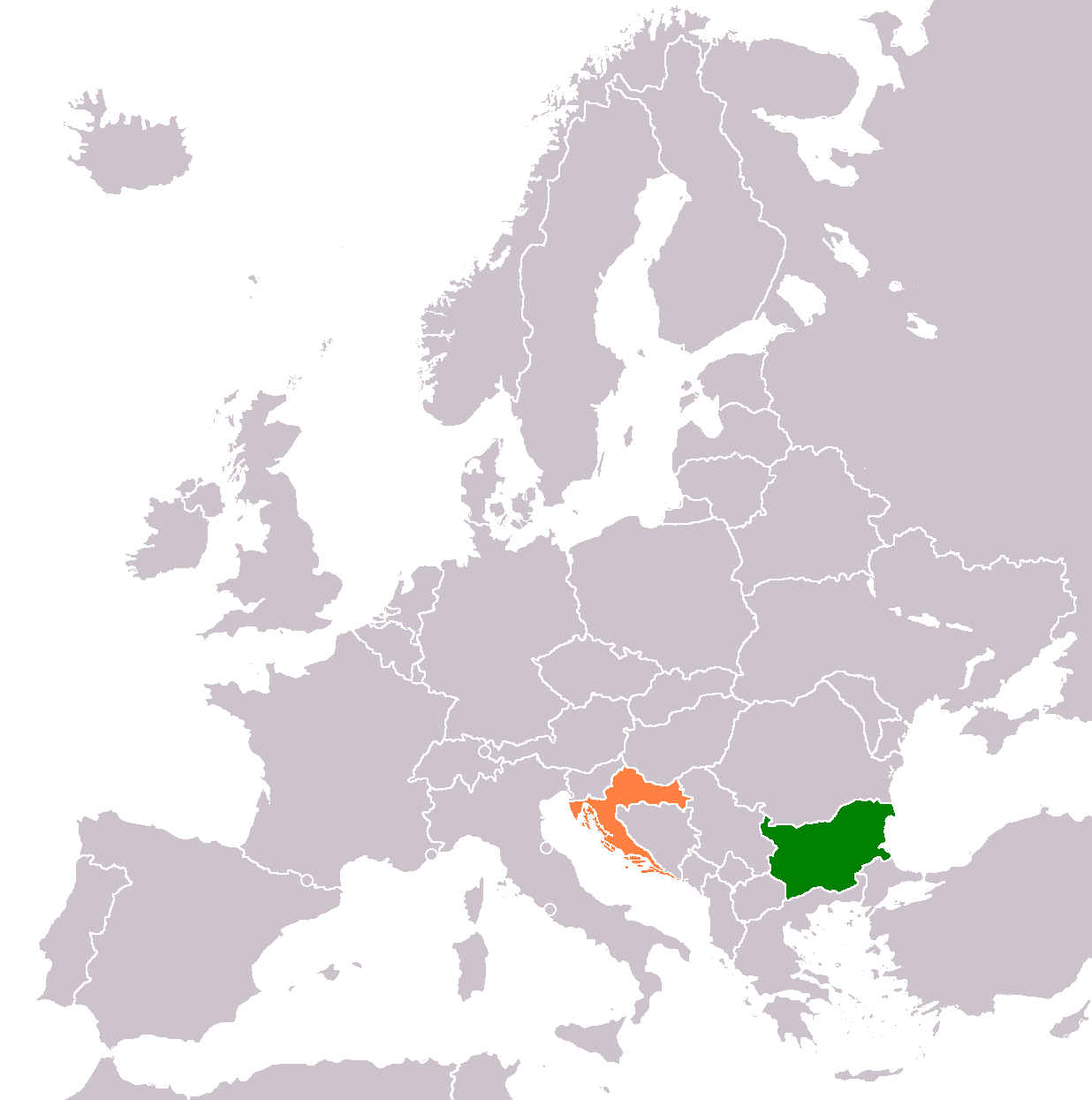

- Bulgaria: Croatia

Bulgaria and Croatia established diplomatic relations on 13 August 1992. Bulgaria has had an embassy in Zagreb since 1994, and Croatia has had an embassy in Sofia since 1992. Both countries are full members of the European Union and NATO. Bulgaria has given full support to Croatia's membership in the European Union and NATO.

== History ==
In the 9th and 10th centuries, when Bulgaria and Croatia shared a border, the two countries fought in the Croatian–Bulgarian wars. As early as 853. , the duke of Bulgaria Boris and the duke of Coastal Croatia Trpimir I. exchanged gifts. During the Middle Ages, there was commerce between the Bulgarian Empire and the Republic of Ragusa.

In the late 19th and early 20th centuries, there were strong Bulgarian–Croatian relations in politics, culture, education, and in sport. Stjepan Radić, one of the most prominent Croatian politicians of the era, wrote in his 1917 book that of all Slavs, Bulgarians were closest to Croats. However, Bulgarian–Croatian relations suffered in the pre-World War II Yugoslav state between 1918 and 1941, ruled by the Karađorđević dynasty, due to earlier conflicts between Bulgaria and Serbia.

The Kingdom of Bulgaria was one of the first countries to recognize the Independent State of Croatia. The Bulgarian embassy in Zagreb operated from 1941 to 1944. The Croatian Embassy in Sofia operated from 1941 to 1944. But even after 1944, the friendly relations between the MPO – the organization of the Bulgarian Macedonian emigration, closely related to Ivan Mihailov's VMRO, and the Croatian clerical nationalist emigration continued, as they mutually fought against Tito's Yugoslavia for decades – including rejecting the Macedonian nation and language newly created by Yugoslavia after WWII.

For the rest of the period prior to 1992, there had been no special crisis or event that required bilateral diplomacy from Croatians and Bulgarians as self-representing nations. However, as two South Slavic nations in relatively close proximity, both nations have been party to some form of diplomatic mission throughout the centuries, whether between the Ottoman Empire and the Republic of Venice (which controlled Croatia's coastal region for some centuries), or during the 20th century when Croatia had been part of Yugoslavia and various attempts were made from within Yugoslavia and Bulgaria to incorporate Bulgaria into the Pan-South Slavic nation.

== EU and NATO ==
Bulgaria joined the EU in 2007. Croatia joined the EU in 2013. Bulgaria joined NATO in 2004. Croatia joined NATO in 2009. Bulgaria fully supported Croatia's application to join NATO, which resulted in membership on 1 April 2009, and then the European Union, which resulted in membership on 1 July 2013.

== Resident diplomatic missions ==
- Bulgaria has an embassy in Zagreb.
- Croatia has an embassy in Sofia.
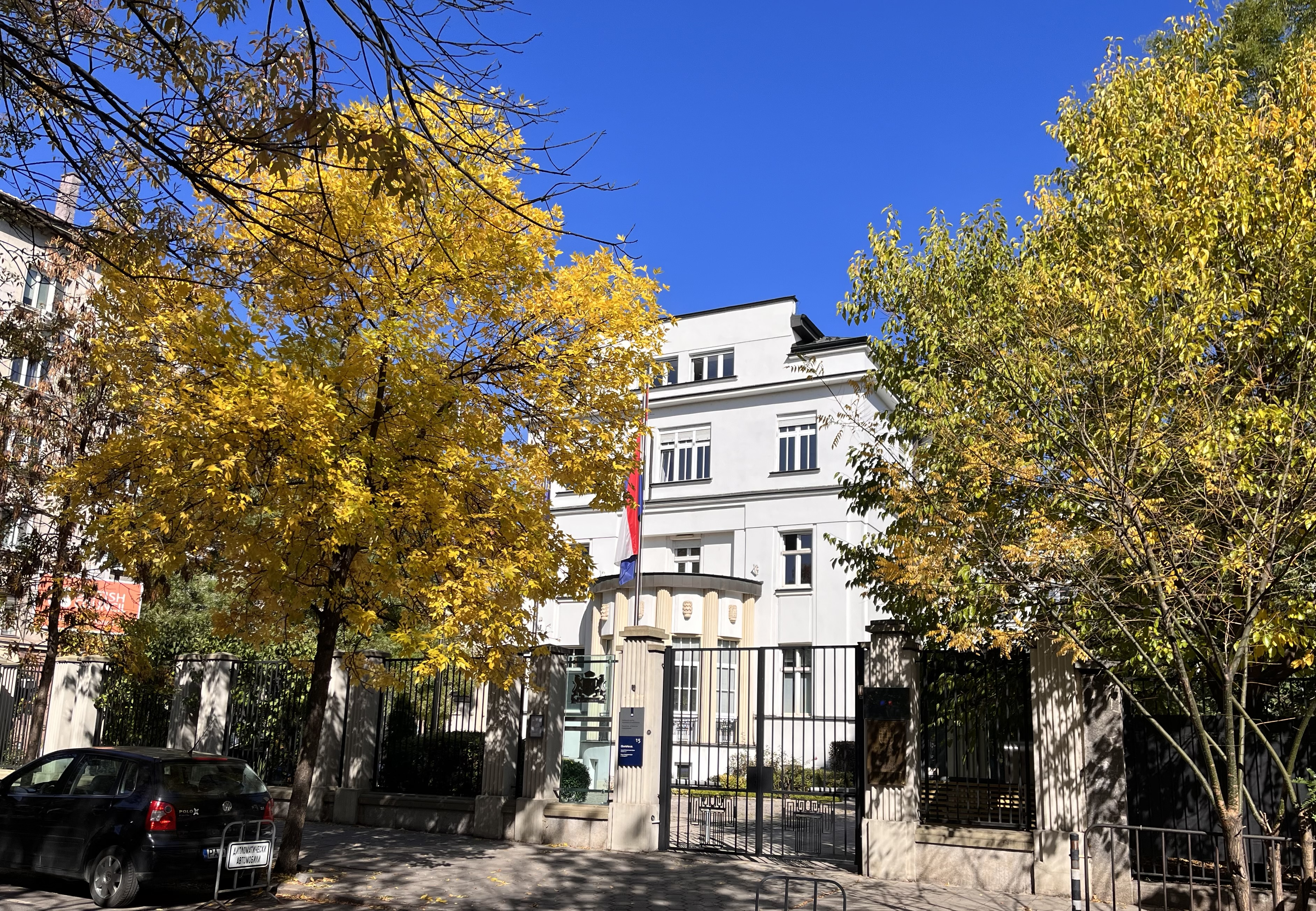
Embassy of Croatia in Sofia

== See also ==
- Foreign relations of Bulgaria
- Foreign relations of Croatia
- Bulgarians in Croatia
- Bulgaria–Yugoslavia relations
- Bulgarian Military Cemetery, Vukovar

== Sources ==
- Metodiev, Kalojan (2016). "Bugarsko-hrvatski politički odnosi 1990. – 2015" [Bulgarian-Croatian political relations (1990-2015)] (PDF). Časopis za suvremenu povijest (in Croatian). 48 (2). Zagreb: Croatian Institute of History: 331–353.
