= Vukovar Synagogue =

Former synagogue in Vukovar, Croatia

Vukovar Synagogue Great Vukovar Synagogue
- Croatian: Velika Vukovarska Sinagoga
- The synagogue, c. 1900, prior to its desecration

- Location of the destroyed synagogue in Croatia

Religion
- Affiliation: Neolog Judaism (former)
- Rite: Nusach Ashkenaz
- Ecclesiastical or organizational status: Synagogue (1889–1941)
- Status: Destroyed

Location
- Location: Lj. Gaja 13, Vukovar
- Country: Croatia
- Interactive map of Vukovar Synagogue; Great Vukovar Synagogue
- Coordinates: 45°20′18″N 19°00′14″E

Architecture
- Architect: Ludwig Schöne (de)
- Type: Synagogue architecture
- Style: Renaissance Revival; Neo-Mudéjar
- Established: 1840s (as a congregation)
- Completed: 1889
- Destroyed: 1941 (devastated); 1958 (demolished)

The Vukovar Synagogue, also the Great Vukovar Synagogue (Croatian: Velika Vukovarska Sinagoga), was a former Neolog Jewish synagogue, located in Vukovar, Croatia. The synagogue was completed in 1889, in the Kingdom of Croatia-Slavonia, within the Austria-Hungary, after the first smaller synagogue was sold to the Calvinist church in 1910. The synagogue was devastated by the Nazis in 1941; and demolished in 1958.

== History ==
The Jews of Vukovar settled in the city in the 19th century from other parts of the Habsburg monarchy. The Jewish community in Vukovar was one of the oldest and most significant Jewish communities in Croatia. The first Vukovar synagogue was built in 1845 by architect Fran Funtak. In 1889, Austria-Hungarian architect Ludwig Schöne built the Great Vukovar Synagogue for over 200 members of the Vukovar Jewish community.

In 1941, during World War II, the synagogue was plundered and devastated by the Nazis. Almost all members of the city's Jewish community were killed during the Holocaust; including Rabbi Izrael Scher (also known as Izidor Šer, born 1901) and his wife, Klara (born 1906), both doctors, who were murdered at the Jasenovac concentration camp in July 1941. In 1958, communist authorities of the SFR Yugoslavia demolished the synagogue and sold the remaining ruins.

A virtual reconstruction of the synagogue was completed by the Vienna University of Technology in 2006. In 2002 it was reported that there were plans to rebuild the former destroyed synagogue.

== See also ==
- History of the Jews in Croatia
- List of synagogues in Croatia
- Jewish Cemetery of Vukovar
