= Bielerhöhe Pass =

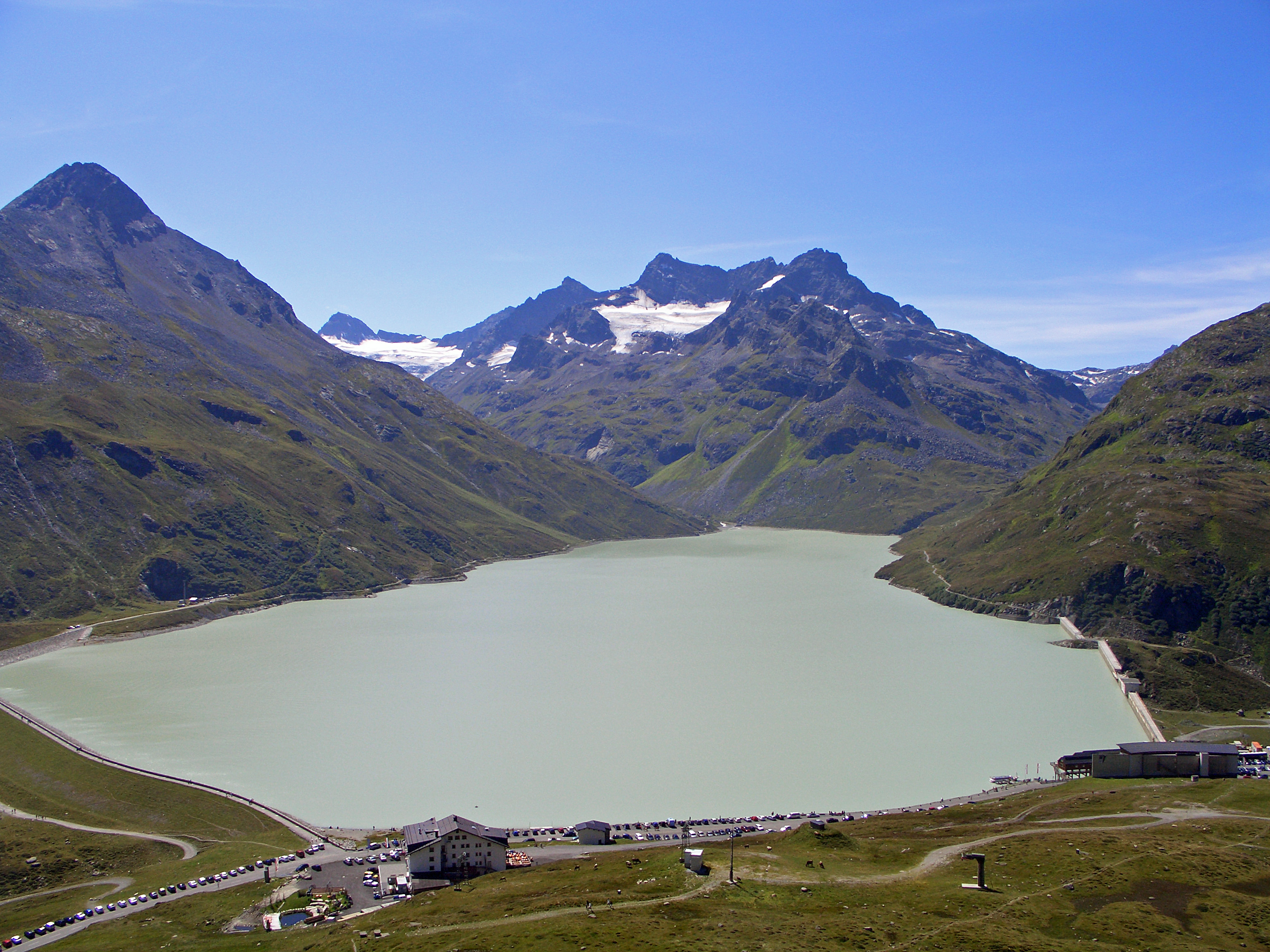
- Silvretta Reservoir from Bielerhöhe Pass

- Location within Austria
- Elevation: 2,071 metres (6,795 ft)

Third Approach
- Location: Austria
- Range: Alps
- Coordinates: 46°55′5″N 10°5′44″E

The Bielerhöhe connects the Montafon valley in Vorarlberg with the Paznaun valley in Tirol. At 2,037 m above sea level, the Bielerhöhe lies in the Vorarlberg region, due north of the Silvretta Reservoir.

Bielerhöhe is the highest reachable point of the Silvretta-Hochalpenstraße, a toll road over the Bielerhöhe. Due to its exposed location the road is closed to normal traffic in winter (from November to April) at which time it can be reached only by cable car from Partenen, and then, using a taxi service, through a tunnel owned by the Vorarlberger Illwerke AG, followed by the last stretch along the mountain pass road.

== Geography ==
=== Location and Landscape ===
The Bielerhöhe lies on the watershed between the Rhine and Danube. The valleys on either side of the Bielerhöhe are called Vermunt; the Great Vermunt and the Swiss Vermunt on the Vorarlberg side close to what is known today as the Vermunt reservoir, and the Small Vermunt on the Tirol side. The former give rise to the upper reaches of the Ill on its way to the Rhine, the Vermunt brook flows into the latter on its way to the Trisanna and Inn rivers. The top of the pass lies in Vorarlberg, the state border with Tirol runs a little to the east and over the Zeinisjoch.

The lower reaches of the Ochsen valley, which branches off towards the Piz Buin in the south, are submerged in the Silvretta reservoir which dominates the Bierlerhöhe. In order to control the water discharge of the Ill, the reservoir has been extended from the Ochsen valley towards the top of the pass, and is secured with dams in both directions.

The name Bielerhöhe refers to two locations: the two kilometers of relatively flat landscape between two steep inclines along with the small rise on the northern flank of the pass (2,071m) over which a hiking trail leads, as well as the highest point of the road (2,032m). The original Bielerhöhe (2,021m) has also disappeared under the dam.

The Bierlerspitze (2,545m) is to the north of the Bielerhöhe, and to the south the Hohes Rad (2,934m) and the Lobspitzen (2,873m at their highest point). Between the two the Piz Buin dominates from a distance.

=== The Bielerhöhe community ===
The Madlenerhaus, a German Alpine Club base, is situated close to the highest point of the pass, as well as guest houses and hotels, . Of architectural interest is the Silvrettahaus, built as a base for the Illwerk AG in 1991/92, and which also serves as a hotel. The little church, the Barbara Chapel, dates back to the power station construction activities in the 1960s. It was built between 1965 and 1967 to commemorate power station building workers who had died, is dedicated to the patron saint of mountain engineers, and serves as the chapel for the community.

== Development ==
=== Silvretta reservoir ===
The Silvetta reservoir stands at exactly the same elevation as the pass and is the highest of the Ill power plant group. The River Ill has its source south of the pass, close to which it would occasionally change its path and instead of heading west towards the Rhine, it would sometimes flow eastwards into the Inn. The reservoir brought this to an end; not only does it accumulate water from the Ill, but its two dams regulate the direction of outflow.

Originally constructed solely for the power plant, the reservoir has developed into a popular tourist attraction and today is also a fishing destination. A feature is a boat tour with the motorboat Silvretta, Europe's only regular motorboat transport over 2,000 m above sea level. This feature can however not be used at the moment as the service was discontinued due to a technical defect in the 2011 season, and since then has not been reintroduced.

=== Highest Point of the Silvretta high alpine road ===
As part of the construction of the power plant, the Silvretta high alpen road was built in 1953 between Partenen and Galtür. Its route runs above the original high point of the pass which is now blocked by the reservoir. Originally only intended to be a construction road, it is now a toll section of the B/L 188 Paznauerstraße/Montafoner Straße which links Pians with Bludenz, and is in demand as a tourist route even if it is unimportant for transit traffic.

On the western slopes the road rises by 700 metres over a linear distance of just three kilometers to reach the Vermunt reservoir. This is achieved thanks to more than 25 hairpin bends which extend the road to a length of nine kilometers thereby reducing the gradient. From the Vermunt reservoir dam, and with fewer hairpins, the highest point of the pass is relatively easily to reach. In contrast, the eastern slopes could be built without hairpin bends and so the road is significantly easier to negotiate.

=== Winter sports region Silvretta-Bielerhöhe ===
There is a small ski resort at the Bielerhöhe, comprising a short drag lift and a few kilometers of cross-country ski trails. Although the Silvretta road is closed in winter, the ski area is still accessible. Access is gained using the Vermunt cable car from Partenen to Tromenier (1,731m), and from there with a shuttle-bus through the tunnels of the old construction road which is safe even in winter, to the Vermunt reservoir and Bielerhöhe. As a result, the area has two kilometers of piste. The operating company Illwerke AG offers the cable car and shuttlebus together in a "Erlebnis Silvretta Bielerhöhe" ticket. Jöring snow cat tours from Galtür are also possible from this altitude.

Furthermore, the entire area stretching down to the central and north Silvretta forms the largest ski touring area in Vorarlberg. The tourist accommodation is explicitly set up for ski tourers offering changing facilities and lockers for day tours besides accommodation (Berggasthof Piz Buin). This is unusual in Austria since ski tourers are generally not especially welcome in ski resorts. The Illwerke markets itself as "cross country ski and ski tour paradise".

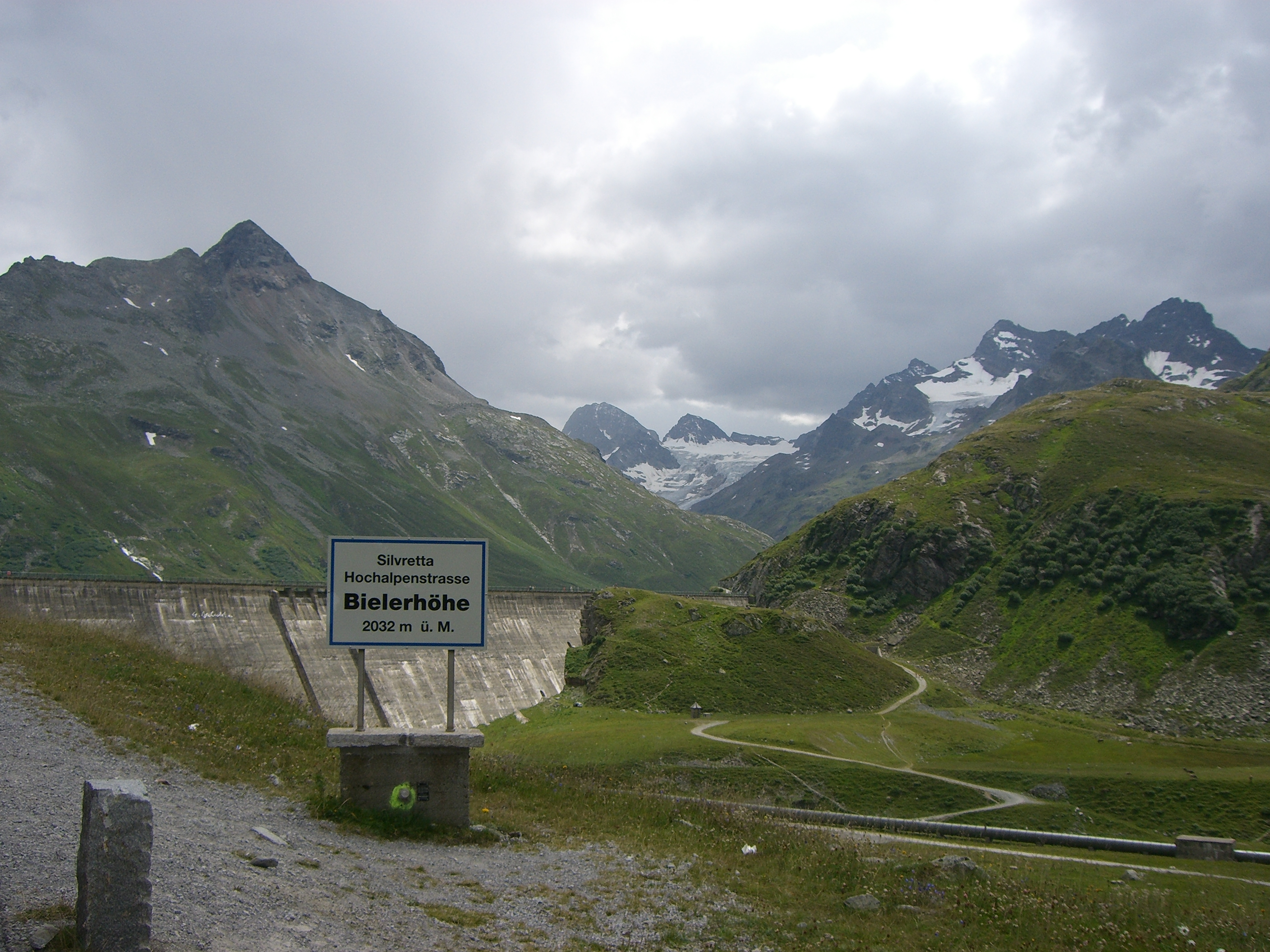
Bielerhöhe signpost approaching from the west with the dam in the background under which is the old high point of the pass.

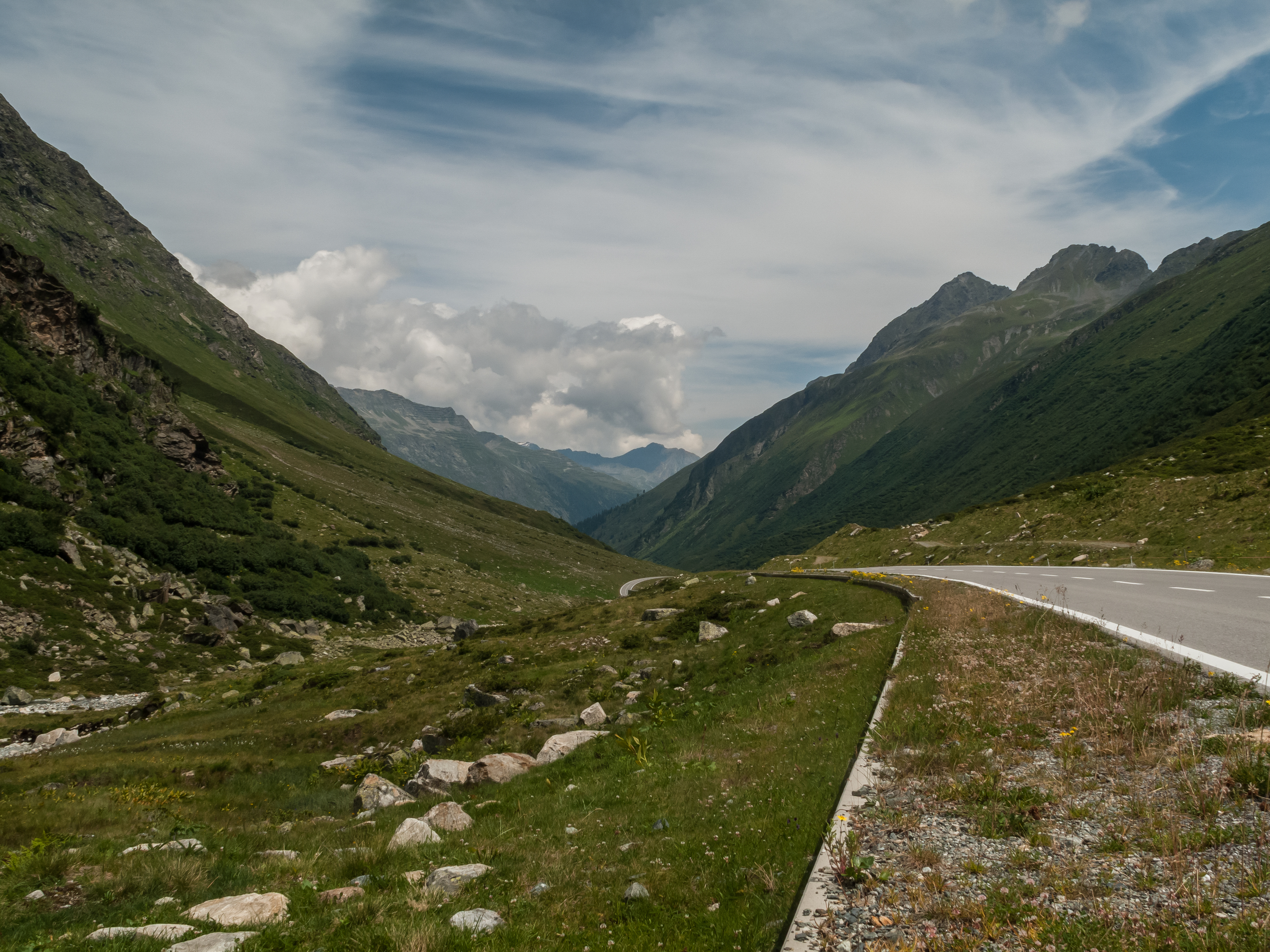
panorama between Bielerhöhe and Wirl

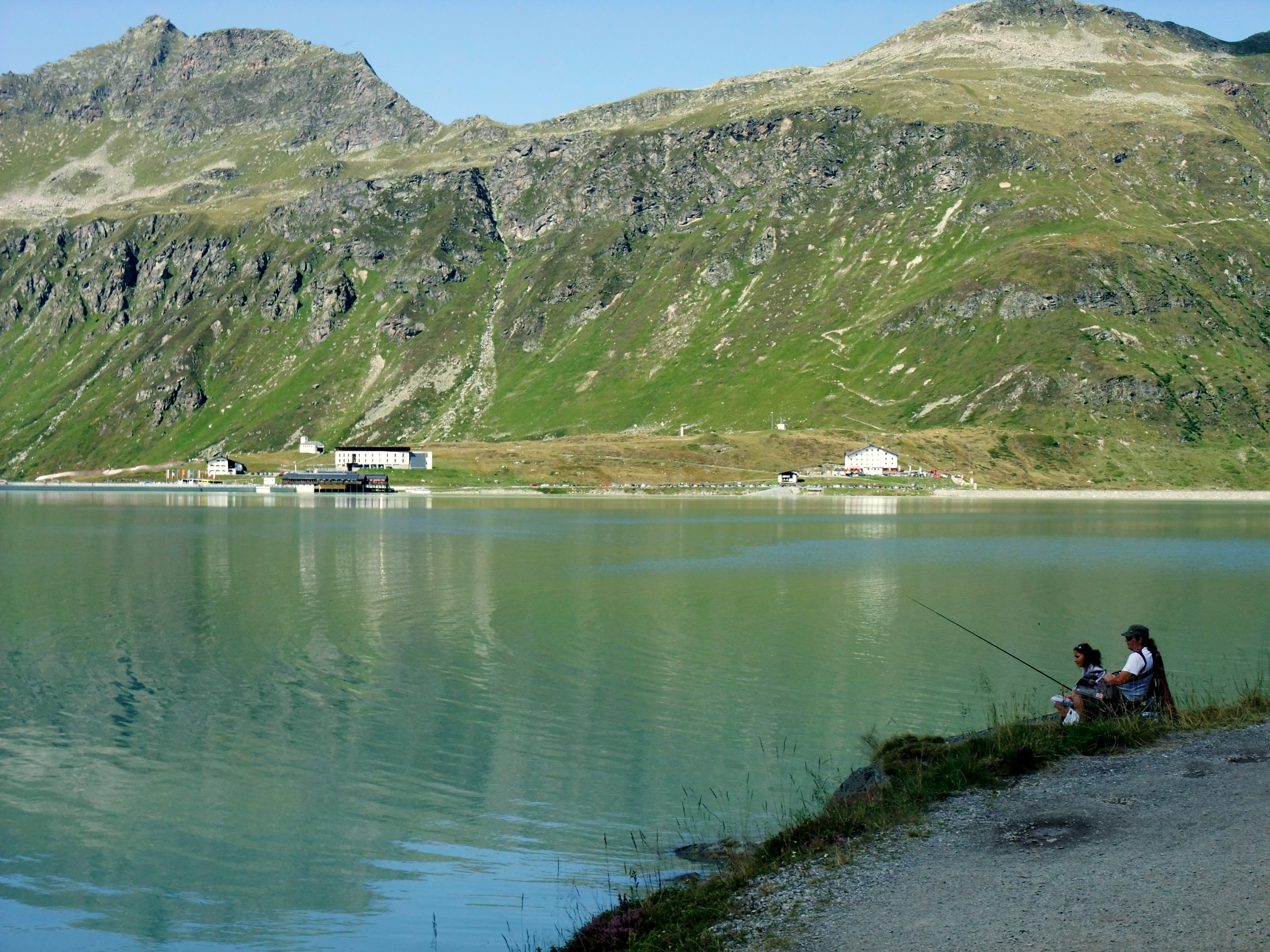
Silvretta reservoir with the Bielerhöhe community

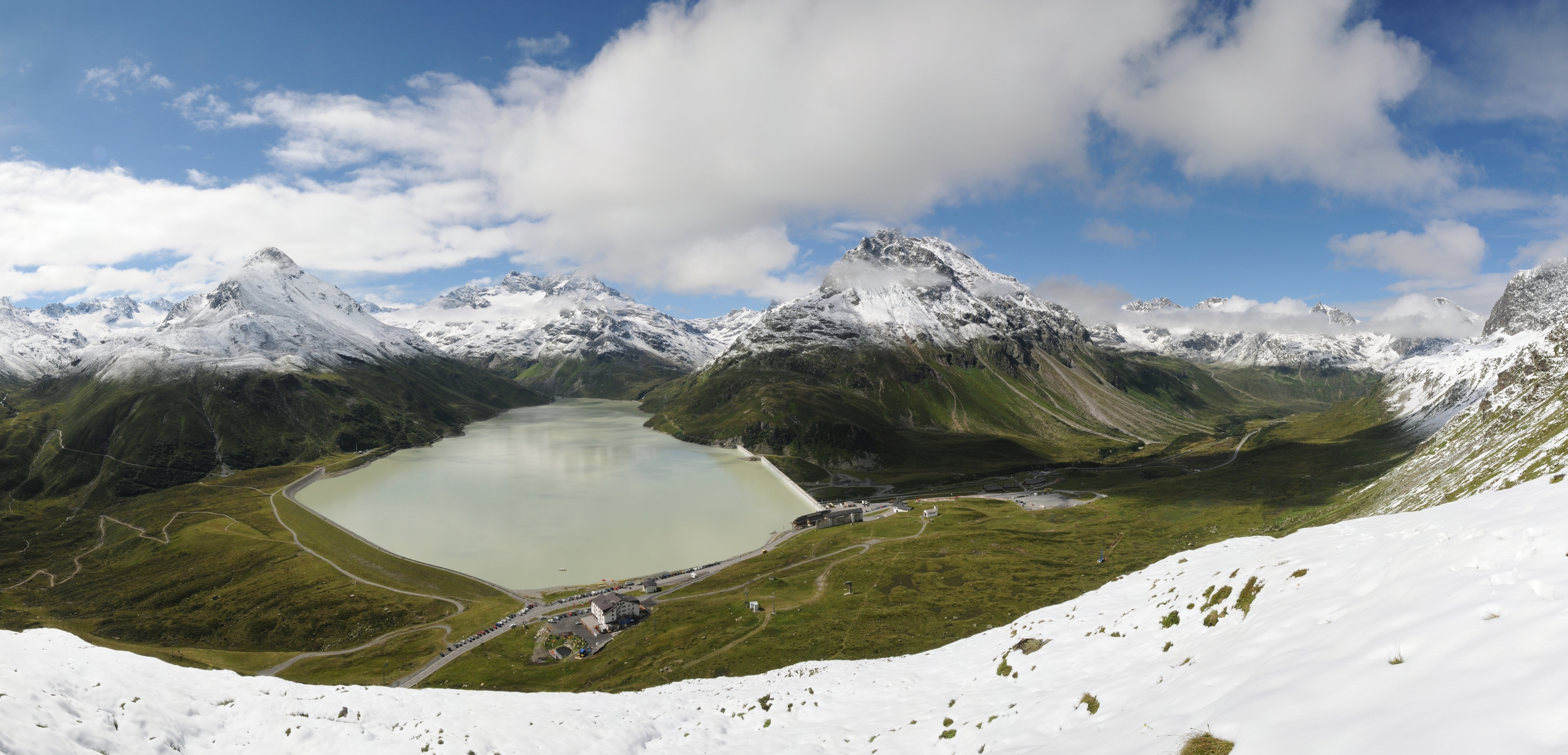
Silvretta reservoir panorama

== See also ==
- List of highest paved roads in Europe
- List of mountain passes
