= Vojteh Ravnikar =

Slovenian architect (1943–2010)

- Born: 4 April 1943; Ljubljana
- Died: 17 September 2010 (aged 67); Golnik
- Education: University of Ljubljana
- Occupation: Architect
- Buildings: Slovene National Theatre Nova Gorica
- Projects: Piranesi

Vojteh Ravnikar (4 April 1943 – 17 September 2010) was a Slovenian architect.

== Early life ==
Ravnikar was born in Ljubljana, in what was then the Kingdom of Yugoslavia, but spent most of his childhood years in the town of Nova Gorica in western Slovenia. After graduating from the Nova Gorica Grammar School, he attended the University of Ljubljana, graduating with a degree in architecture.

== Career ==
Ravnikar began his architectural career in 1978, and designed a number of well-known buildings in Slovenia. His best-known buildings are in the coastal region of the country, including the town hall of Sežana, the Piran Hotel in Piran, and the National Theatre in Nova Gorica.

Ravnikar won a number of awards, including the 1987 Plečnik Award (Slovenia's national architecture award), the 1990 International Piranesi Award, the 2003 Prešeren Award (Slovenia's national art award), and the 2006 Herder Prize (an international award for achievement in science, art, or literature).

From 1993 until his death, he worked as a professor at the University of Ljubljana. He worked as a guest professor at the University of Trieste, Trieste, Italy (2002), and the University of Trento, Trento, Italy (2004–2005).

He died in Golnik near Kranj on 17 September 2010, at the age of 67.

== Personal life ==
Ravnikar was married to the Slovenian politician Majda Širca (Zares).
