= Dudik Memorial Park =

Memorial complex in Vukovar, Croatia

- Spomen-park Dudik; Спомен-парк Дудик
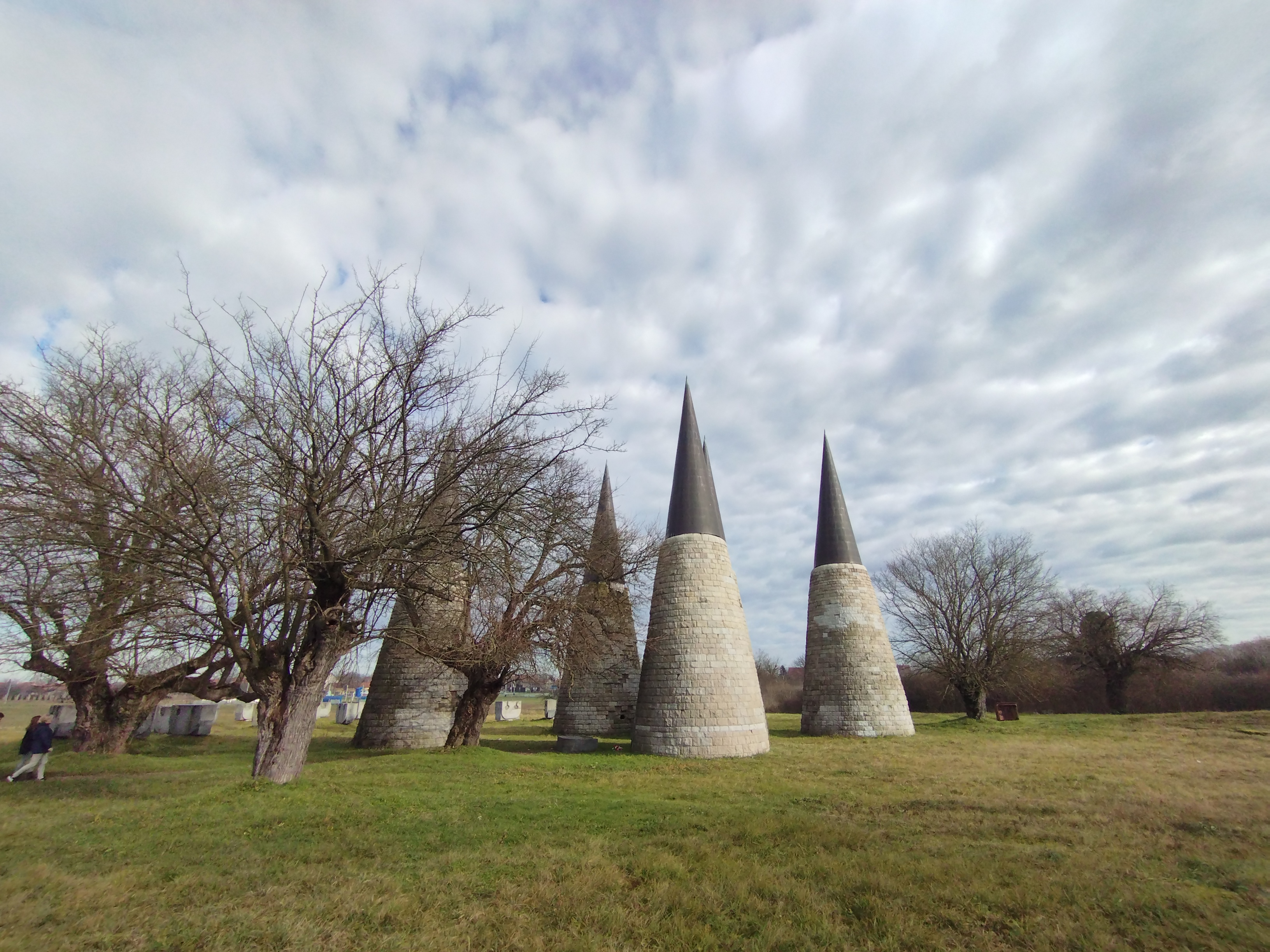
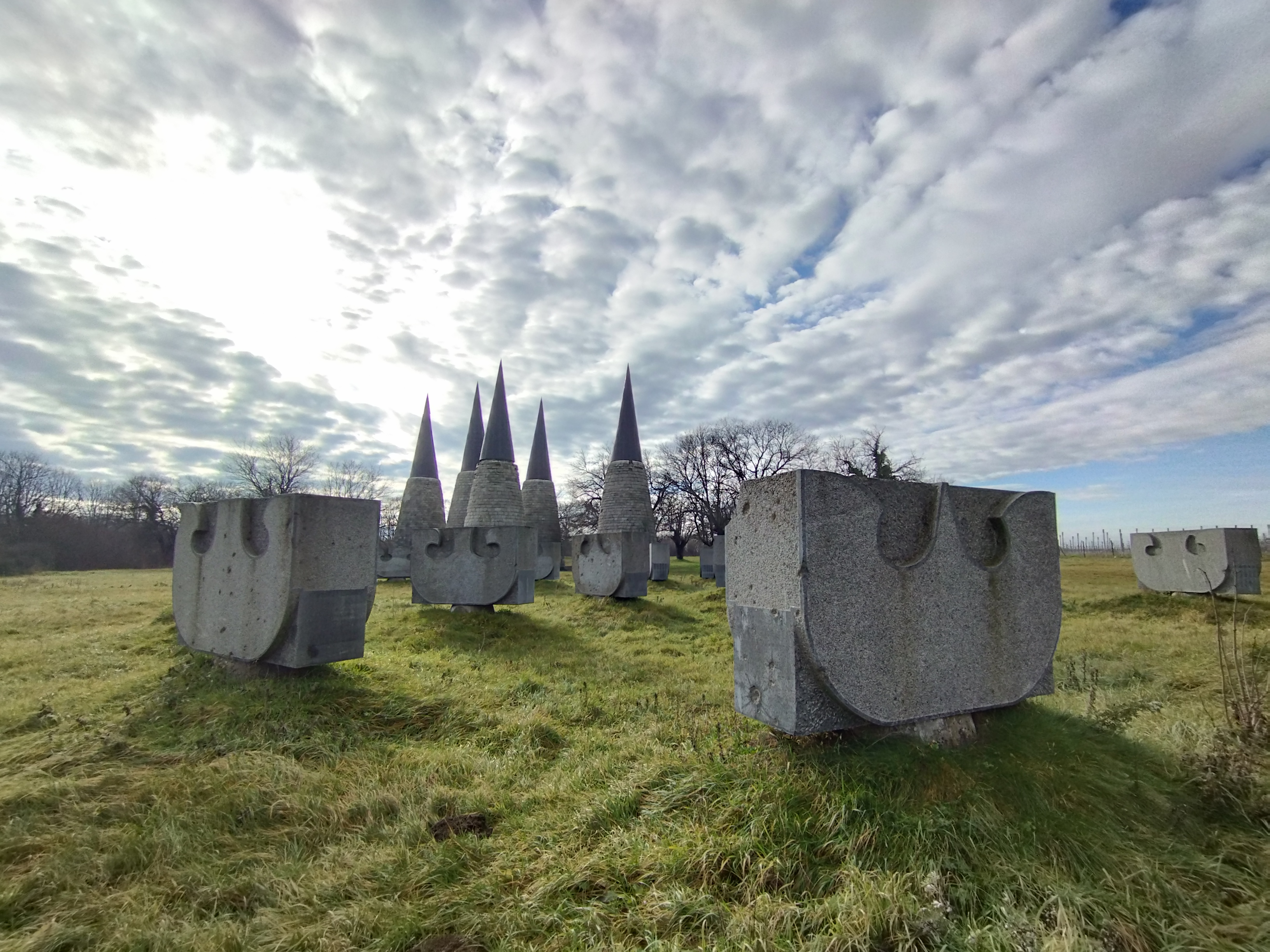
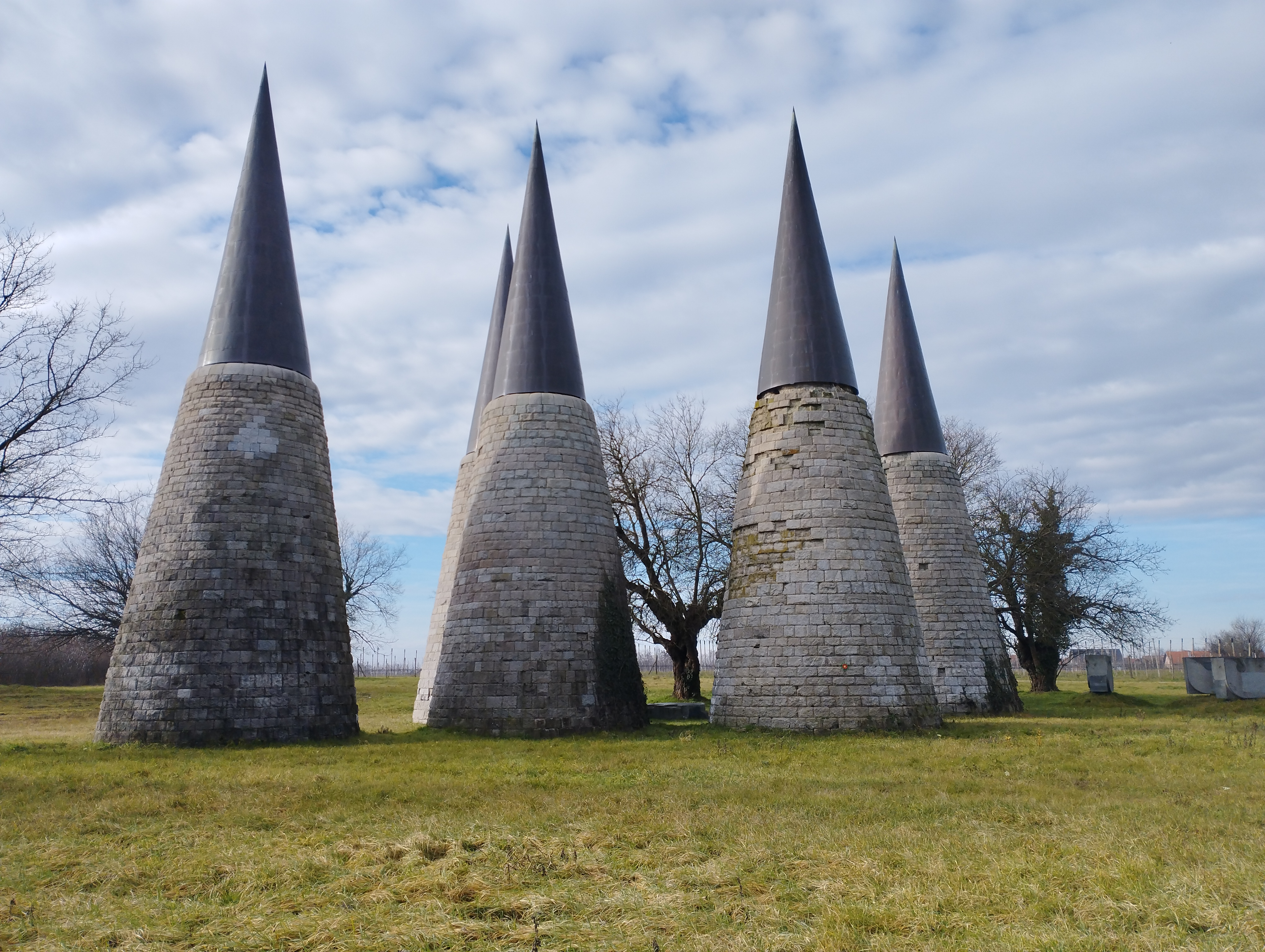
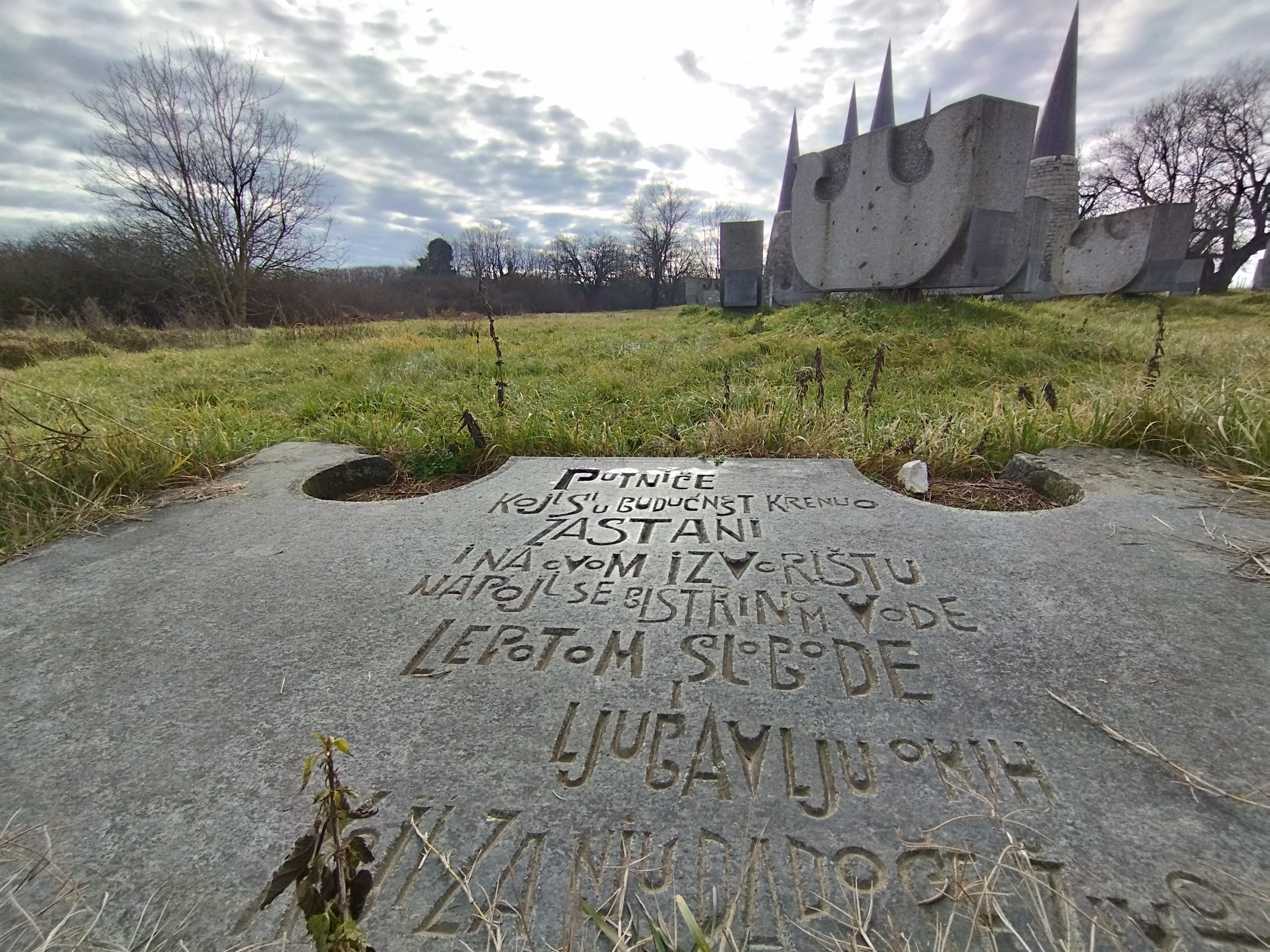
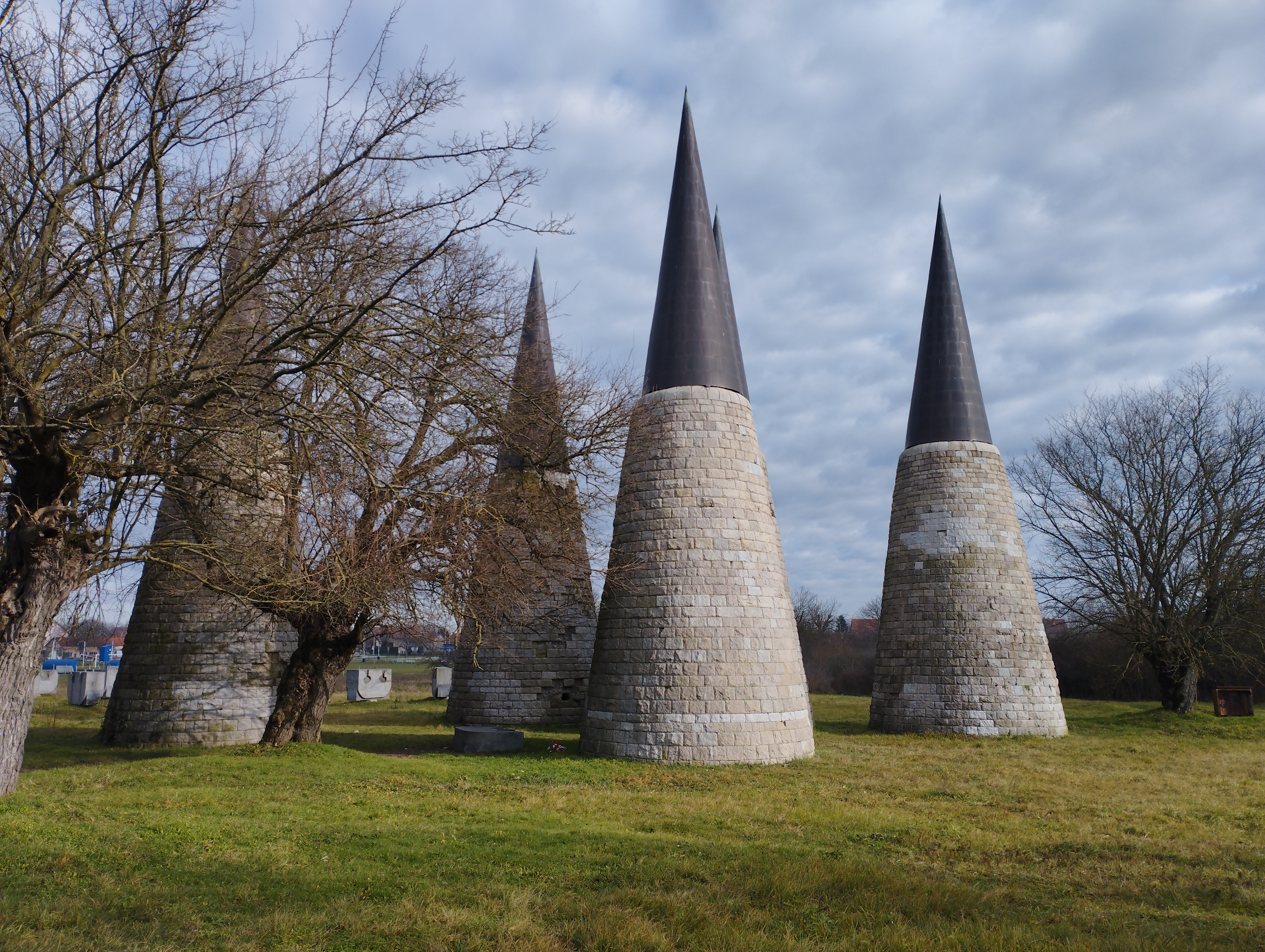
- The monument in January, 2023
- Interactive map of Dudik Memorial Park
- Location: Vukovar, Croatia
- Coordinates: 45°20′01″N 19°00′45″E
- Designer: Bogdan Bogdanović
- Type: War memorial park
- Beginning date: 1978
- Completion date: 1980
- Restored date: 2016

Dudik Memorial Park (Croatian: Spomen-park Dudik, Serbian: Спомен-парк Дудик) is a World War II war memorial park located in Vukovar in eastern Croatia. The site is dedicated to 455 individuals who were executed by the authorities of the Independent State of Croatia during the World War II in Yugoslavia.

== History ==
In 1945, the mortal remains of 384 victims were exhumed and placed in the common ossuary dedicated to the victims of Dudik, fallen soldiers of the 5th Vojvodina Brigade of the 36th Vojvodina Division and the Red Army soldiers who fought within the Vukovar area. Most of the victims at the Dudik were Yugoslav Partisan and ethnic Serbs from modern day Croatia and from Inđija, Stara Pazova, Ruma, Šid, Sremska Mitrovica and Irig in Serbia who were target of persecution of Serbs in the Independent State of Croatia.

In 1973, the park was classified as a monument of cultural importance. The monument at the Dudik Memorial Park, built from 1978 to 1980, is designed by Bogdan Bogdanović, for which he won the International Piranesi Award.

The Dudik Memorial Park was devastated during the Croatian War of Independence, and in the post-war years was a mined area. Prior to its reconstruction, Vukovar town authorities used it as football field causing criticism among antifascist and Serb minority organizations and local authorities even considered removing the monument. Monuments and park reconstruction began in 2015 and was completed in 2016.

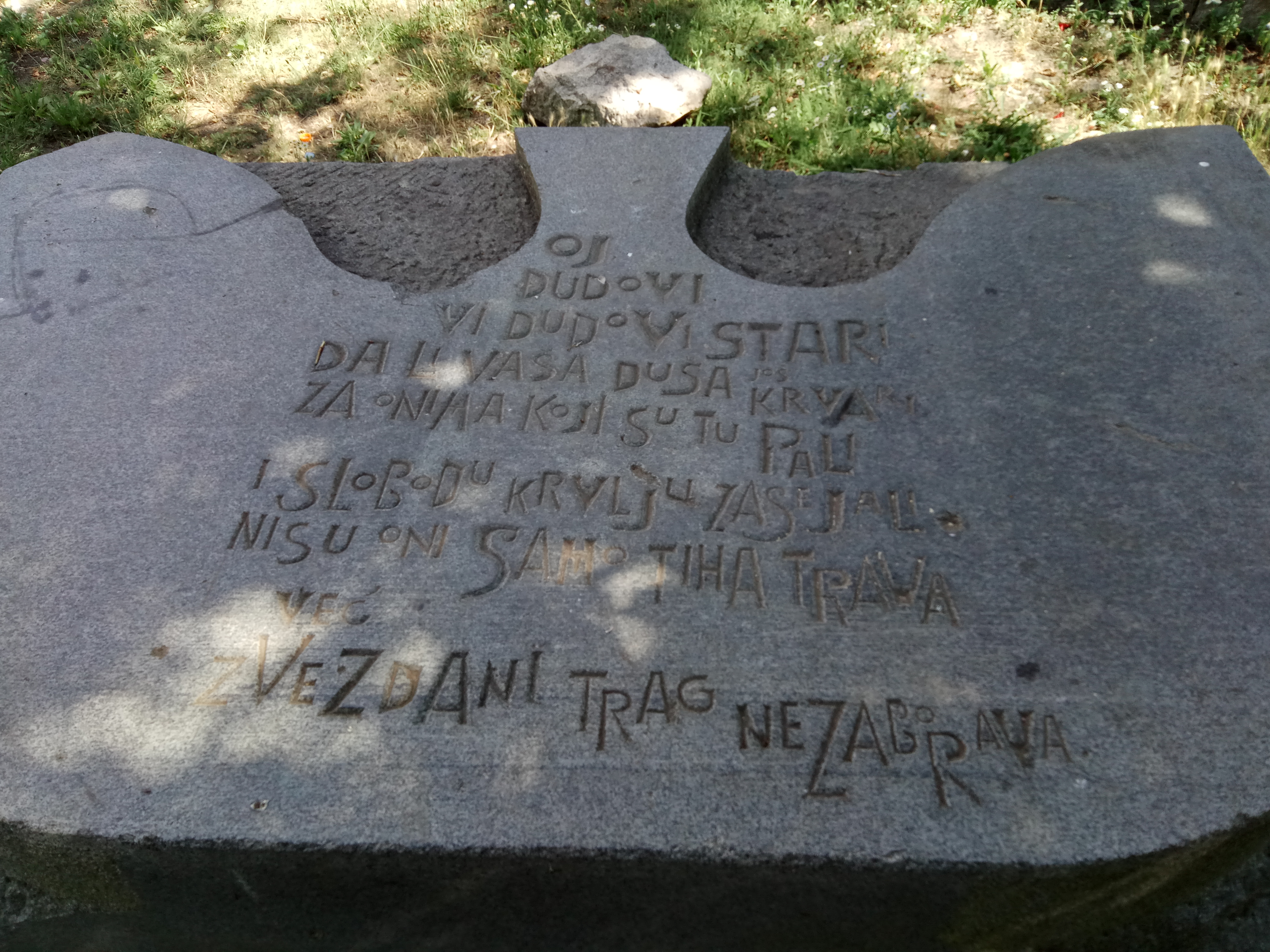

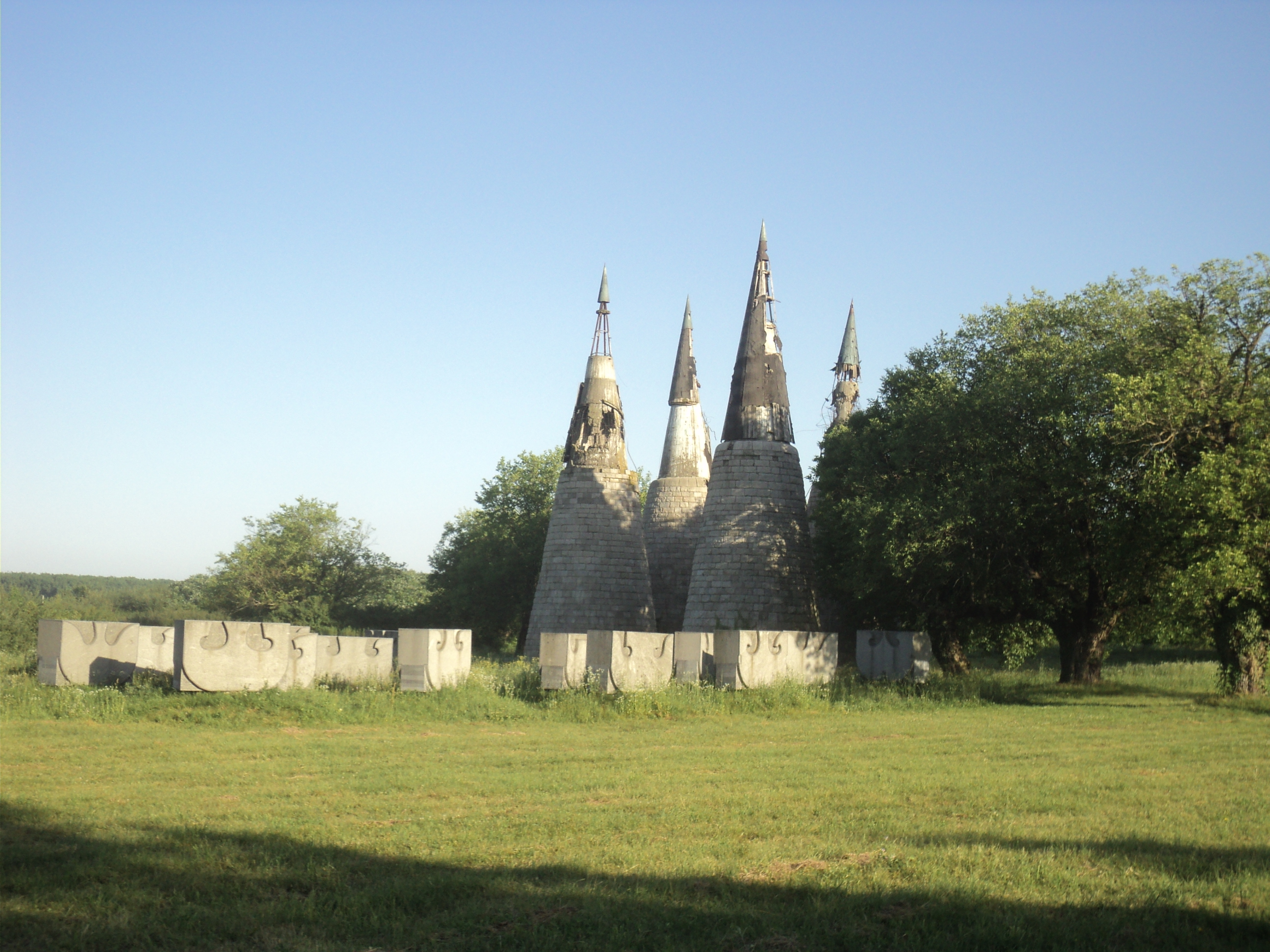

== See also ==
- Ivanci massacre
- List of Yugoslav World War II monuments and memorials in Croatia
- Monument to the victory of the people of Slavonia
- Bulgarian Military Cemetery, Vukovar
