= Jewish Cemetery of Vukovar =

Cemetery in Vukovar-Syrmia County, Croatia

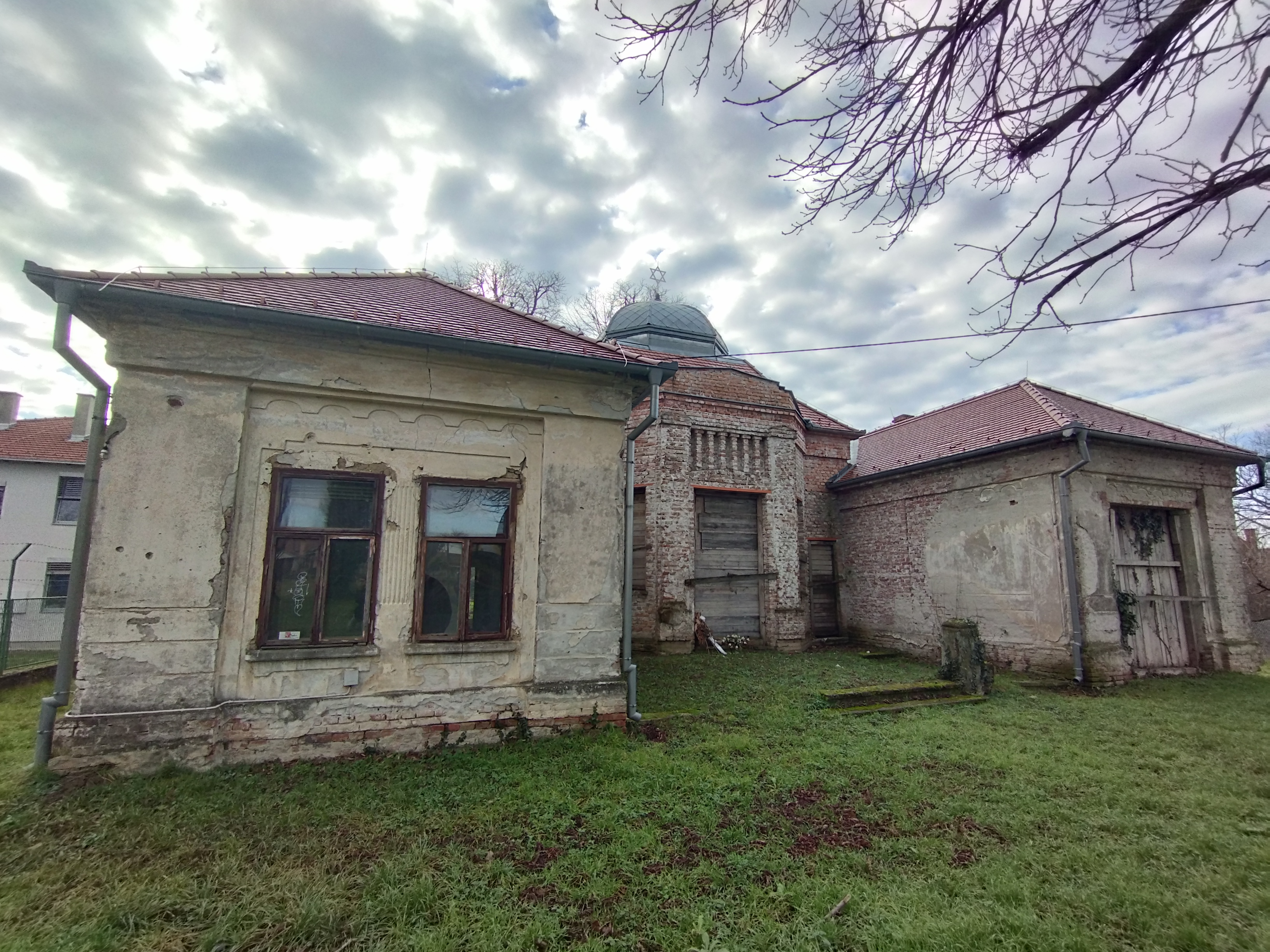
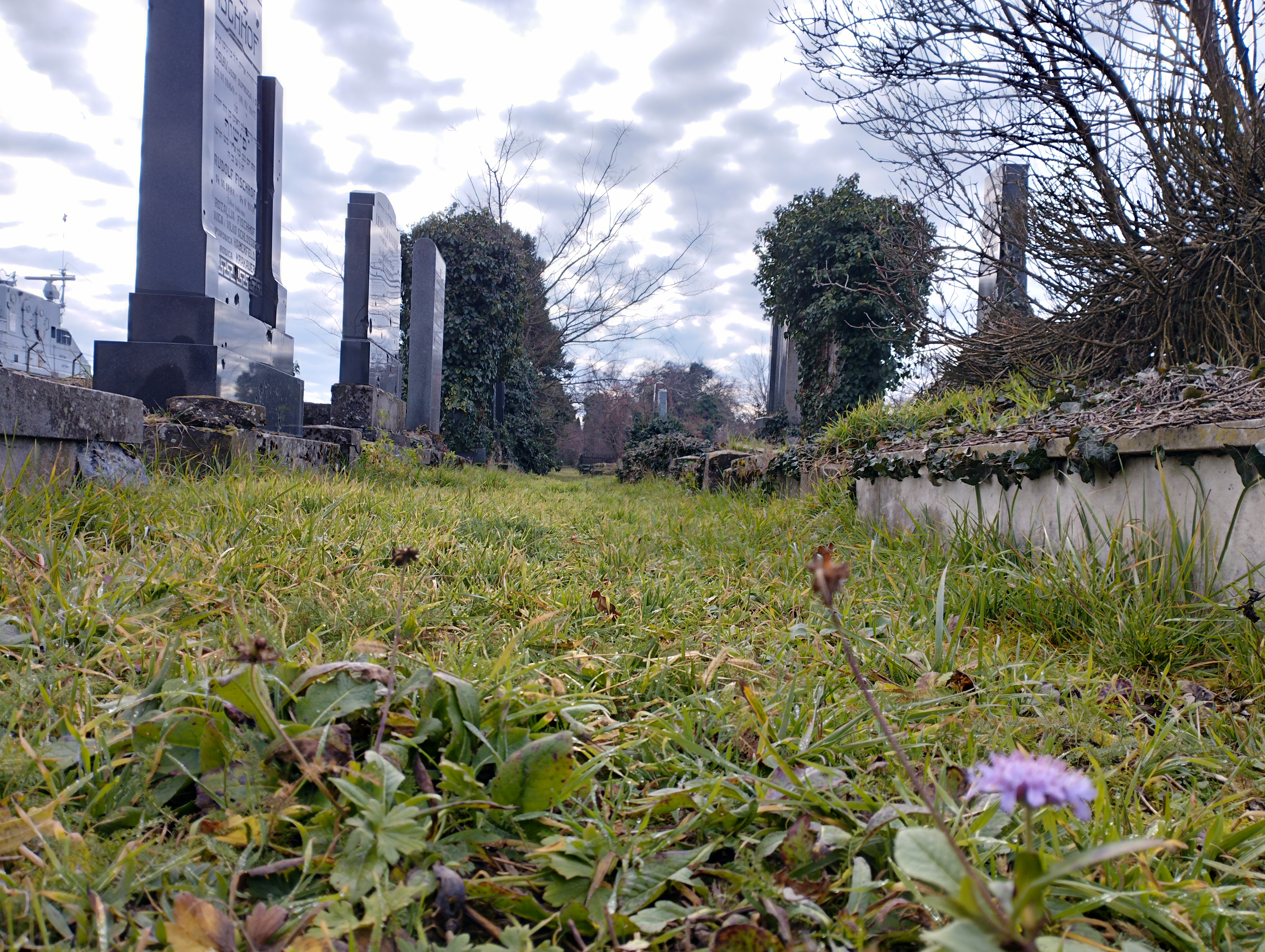
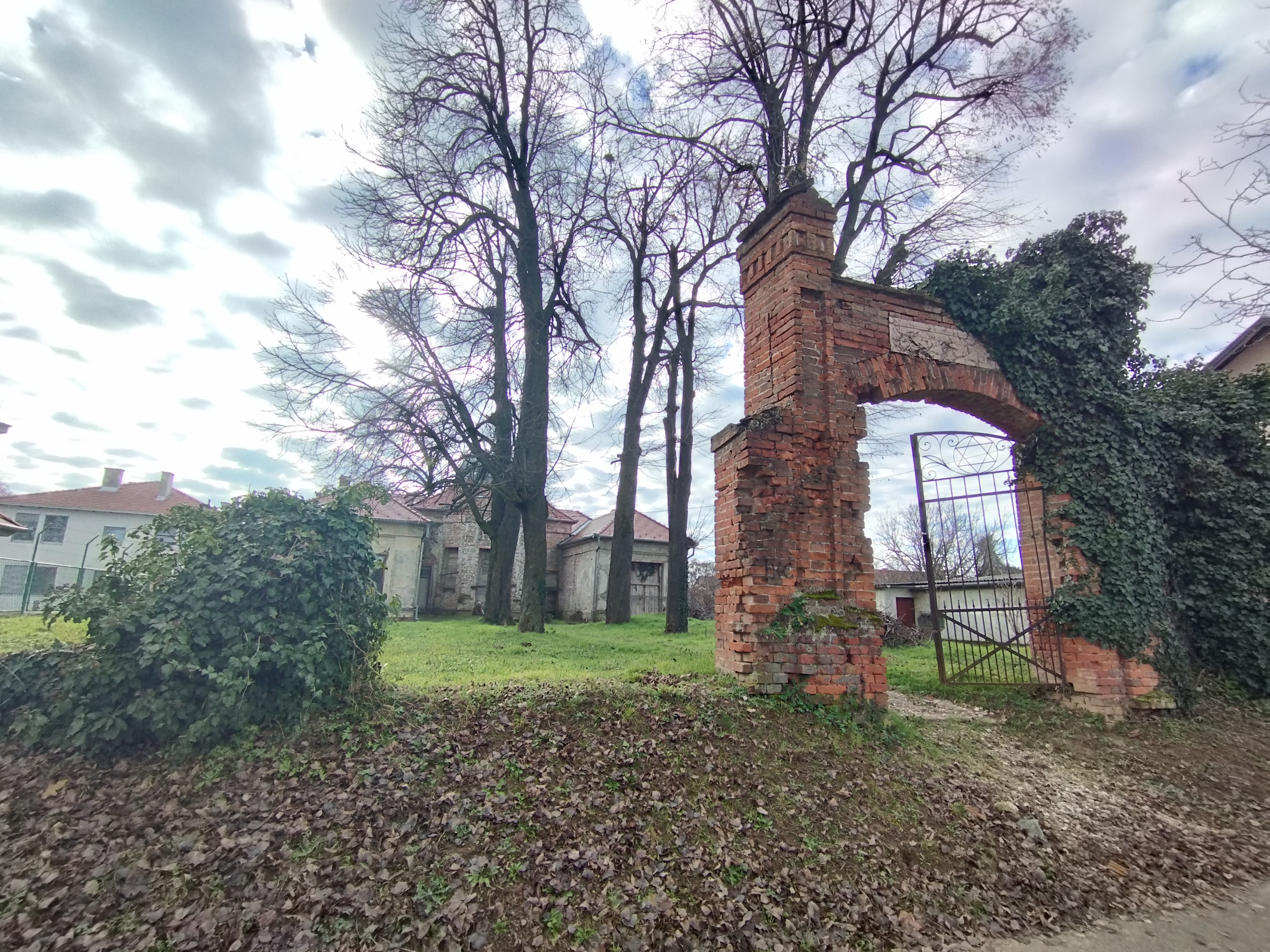
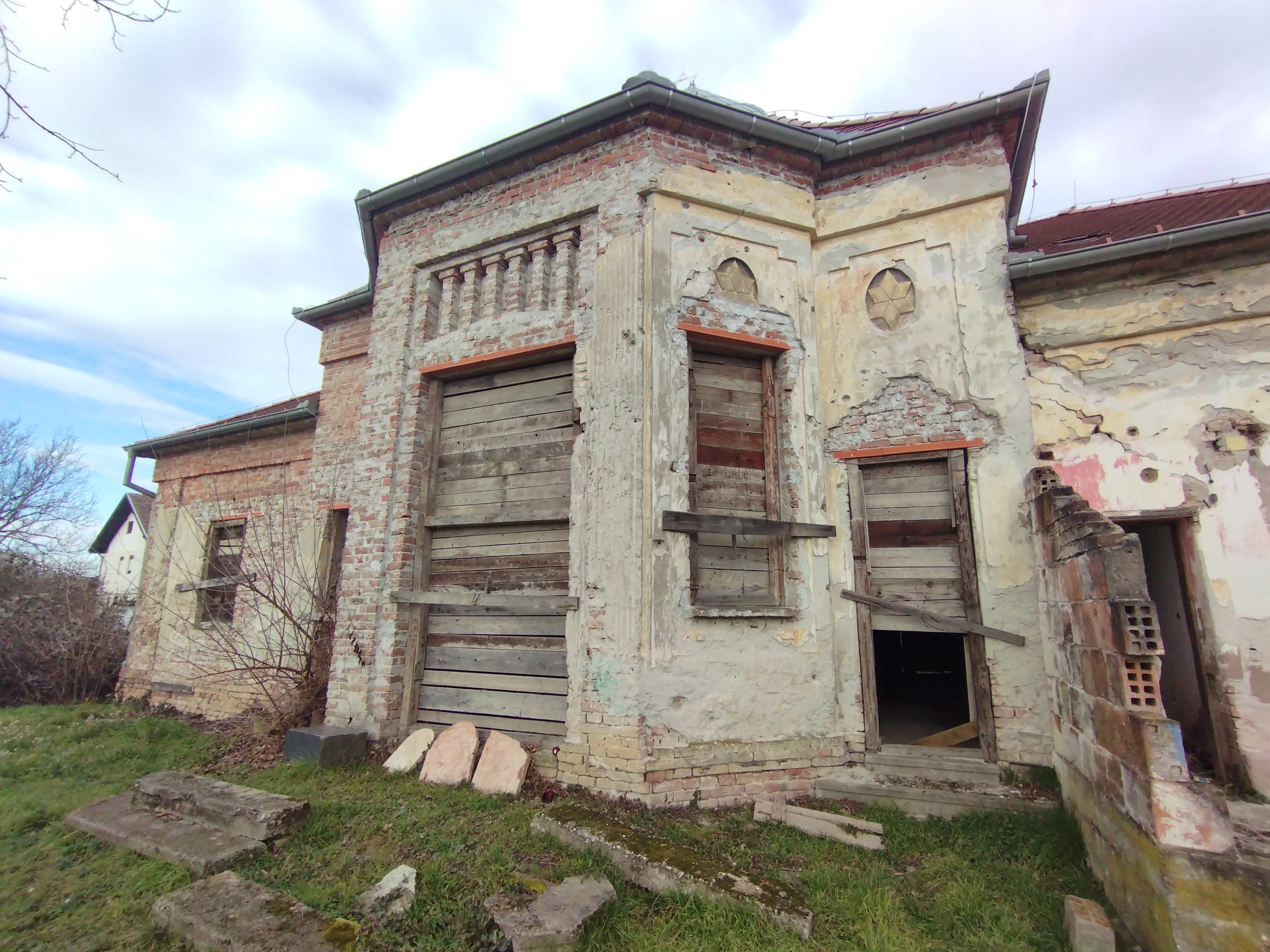
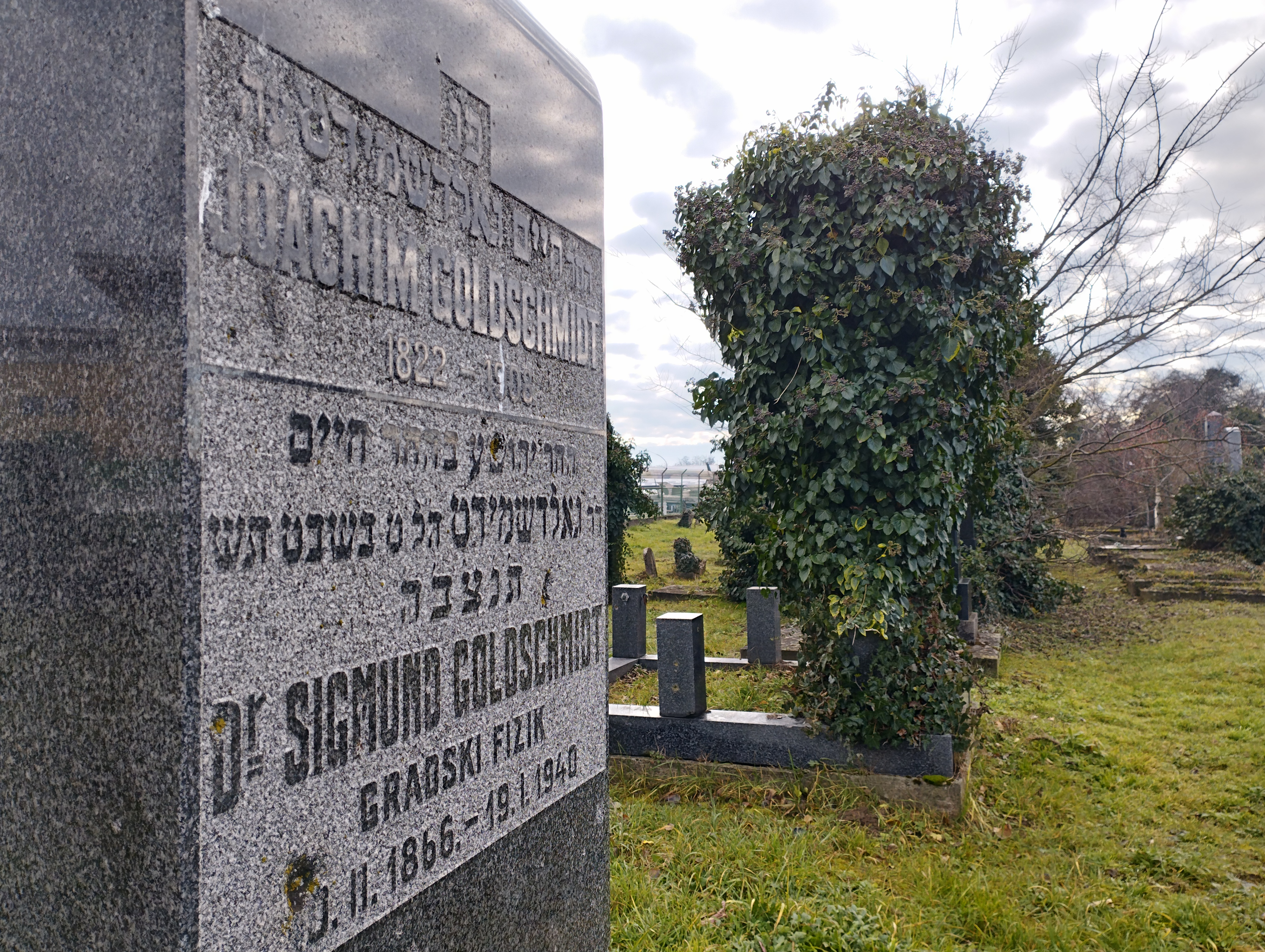
- Jewish Cemetery of Vukovar
- Interactive map of Jewish Cemetery of Vukovar

Details
- Established: 1850
- Location: Vukovar
- Country: Croatia
- Coordinates: 45°20′15″N 19°00′14″E
- Type: Jewish (closed)
- No. of graves: 75 – 100 remaining monuments

The Jewish Cemetery of Vukovar (known also as the New Jewish Cemetery) is a cemetery with approximately 75 to 100 remaining monuments which was used between 1850 and 1948. The oldest tombstone dates back to 1858 with multiple languages used in inscriptions including Hebrew, Hungarian, German and Croatian. The Ceremonial Hall or Zidduk-hadin (built between 1926 and 1928) was designed by Fran Funtak in Art-Deco and Moorish revival style. The first Jewish Cemetery in Vukovar was established in 1830.

== See also ==
- Vukovar Synagogue
