= Tschlin =

- Former municipality
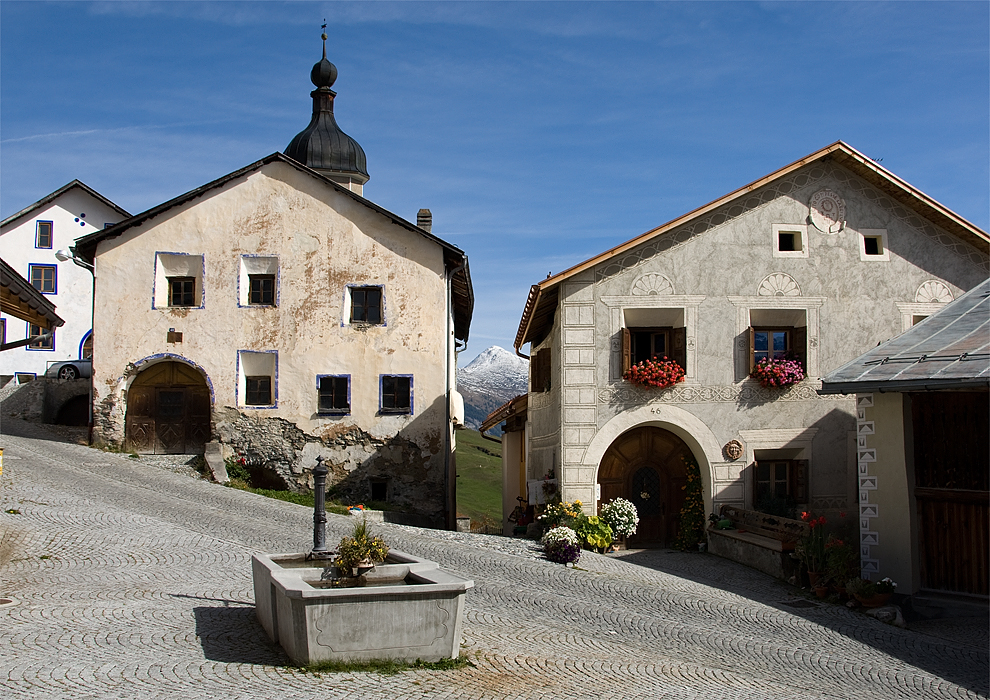

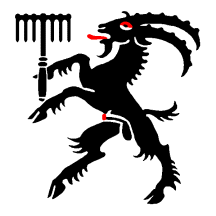
- Flag Coat of arms
- Location of Tschlin
- Location within Switzerland Location within Canton of Graubünden
- Coordinates: 46°52′N 10°25′E
- Country: Switzerland
- Canton: Graubünden
- District: Inn

Area
  - Total: 75.08 km^{2} (28.99 sq mi)
- Elevation: 1,553 m (5,095 ft)

Population (Dec 2011)
  - Total: 442
  - Density: 5.89/km^{2} (15.2/sq mi)
- Time zone: UTC+01:00 (CET)
  - Summer (DST): UTC+02:00 (CEST)
- Postal code: 7559
- SFOS number: 3753
- ISO 3166 code: CH-GR
- Localities: Tschlin, Martina (includes Vinadi) and Strada (includes Chaflur)
- Surrounded by: Graun im Vinschgau (IT-BZ), Nauders (AT-7), Pfunds (AT-7), Samnaun, Spiss (AT-7)
- Website: www.tschlin.ch

Tschlin is a former municipality in the district of Inn in the canton of Graubünden in the extreme east of Switzerland. On 1 January 2013 the municipalities of Ramosch and Tschlin merged to form the new municipality of Valsot.

== History ==
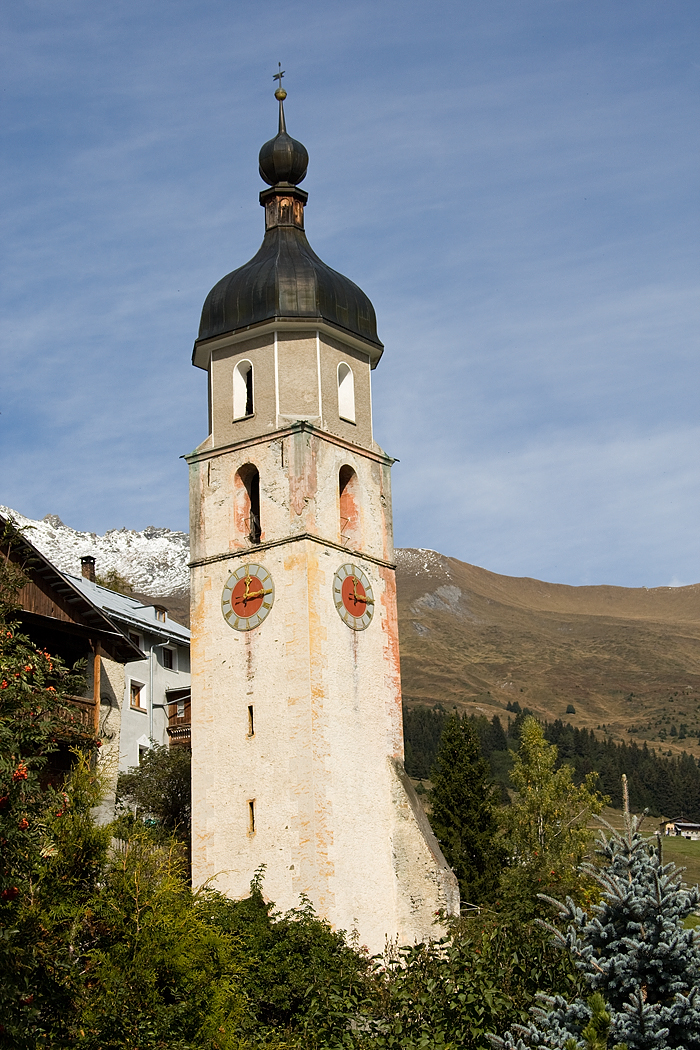
Tower of the Church of St. John the Baptist

While Bronze and Iron Age items have been found in Tschlin, the first mention of the village is in the 10th century. In the 10th century, bishop Hildibald gave the chapterhouse in Chur a gift of a farm house in Tschlin. In the High Middle Ages Tschlin was under the authority of Ramosch. The village church of St. Blasius was built in 1515 in the gothic style. In 1545 the Protestant Reformation reached the village and in 1574–82 the reformer and historian Ulrich Campell worked in Tschlin. In 1856 a fire destroyed much of the village, including the Church of St. John the Baptist. The church was not rebuilt, but the church tower is still visible in the village.

== Geography ==
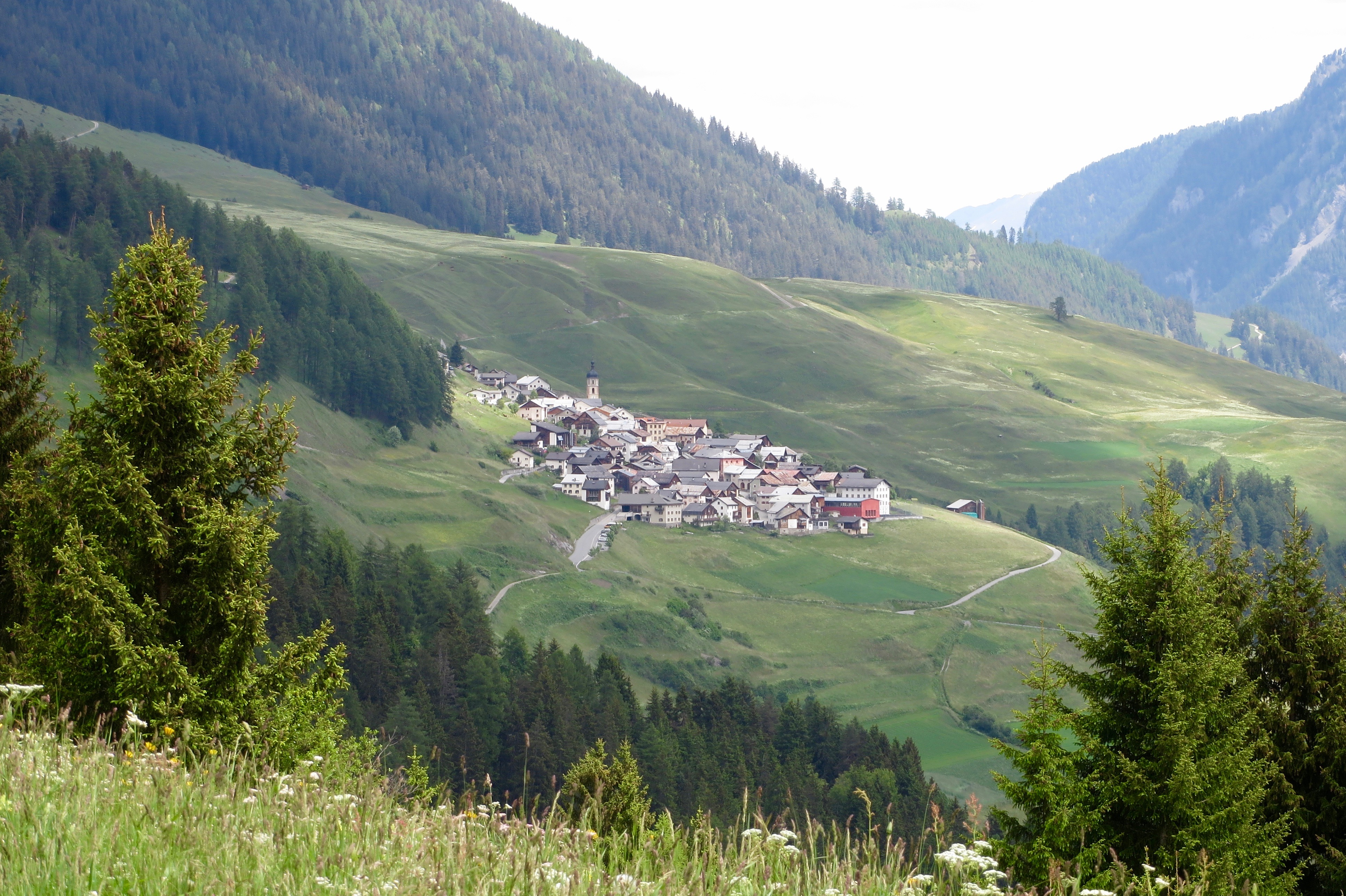
Tschlin village

Aerial view (1954)

Tschlin had an area, as of 2006, of 75.1 km^{2} (29.0 sq mi). Of this area, 28.7% is used for agricultural purposes, while 34.7% is forested. Of the rest of the land, 1.3% is settled (buildings or roads) and the remainder (35.3%) is non-productive (rivers, glaciers or mountains).

The former municipality is located in the Ramosch sub-district of the Inn district. It consists of the village of Tschlin on a terrace above the left bank of the Inn, the sections of Strada and Martina and the hamlets of San Niclà, Chaflur, Sclamischot and Vinadi.

Until 1943 Tschlin was known as Schleins.

== Demographics ==
Tschlin had a population (as of 2011) of 442. As of 2008, 6.3% of the population was made up of foreign nationals. Over the last 10 years the population has grown at a rate of 1.8%.

As of 2000, the gender distribution of the population was 49.6% male and 50.4% female. The age distribution, as of 2000, in Tschlin is; 39 children or 9.9% of the population are between 0 and 9 years old. 27 teenagers or 6.9% are 10 to 14, and 14 teenagers or 3.6% are 15 to 19. Of the adult population, 42 people or 10.7% of the population are between 20 and 29 years old. 59 people or 15.1% are 30 to 39, 54 people or 13.8% are 40 to 49, and 48 people or 12.2% are 50 to 59. The senior population distribution is 37 people or 9.4% of the population are between 60 and 69 years old, 55 people or 14.0% are 70 to 79, there are 16 people or 4.1% who are 80 to 89, and there are 1 people or 0.3% who are 90 to 99.

In the 2007 federal election the most popular party was the SVP which received 48.9% of the vote. The next three most popular parties were the SPS (20.8%), the FDP (14.3%) and the CVP (13.6%).

In Tschlin about 62.8% of the population (between age 25–64) have completed either non-mandatory upper secondary education or additional higher education (either university or a Fachhochschule).

Tschlin has an unemployment rate of 0.81%. As of 2005, there were 62 people employed in the primary economic sector and about 24 businesses involved in this sector. 28 people are employed in the secondary sector and there are 8 businesses in this sector. 101 people are employed in the tertiary sector, with 21 businesses in this sector.

The historical population is given in the following table:

year	population
1835	665
1850	571
1900	553
1930	648
1950	590
1960	553
1970	499
1980	431
1990	515
2000	392
2010	448

== Languages ==
Most of the population (as of 2000) speaks Rhaeto-Romance (71.4%), with German being second most common (25.5%) and Serbo-Croatian being third ( 1.0%).

Languages in Tschlin
Languages	Census 1980		Census 1990		Census 2000	
Languages	Number	Percent	Number	Percent	Number	Percent
German	64	14.85%	130	25.24%	100	25.51%
Romanish	362	83.99%	313	60.78%	280	71.43%
Italian	4	0.93%	33	6.41%	3	0.77%
Population	431	100%	515	100%	392	100%

== Heritage sites of national significance ==
The Museum Stamparia da Strada is listed as a Swiss heritage site of national significance.
