= Valsot =

- Municipality
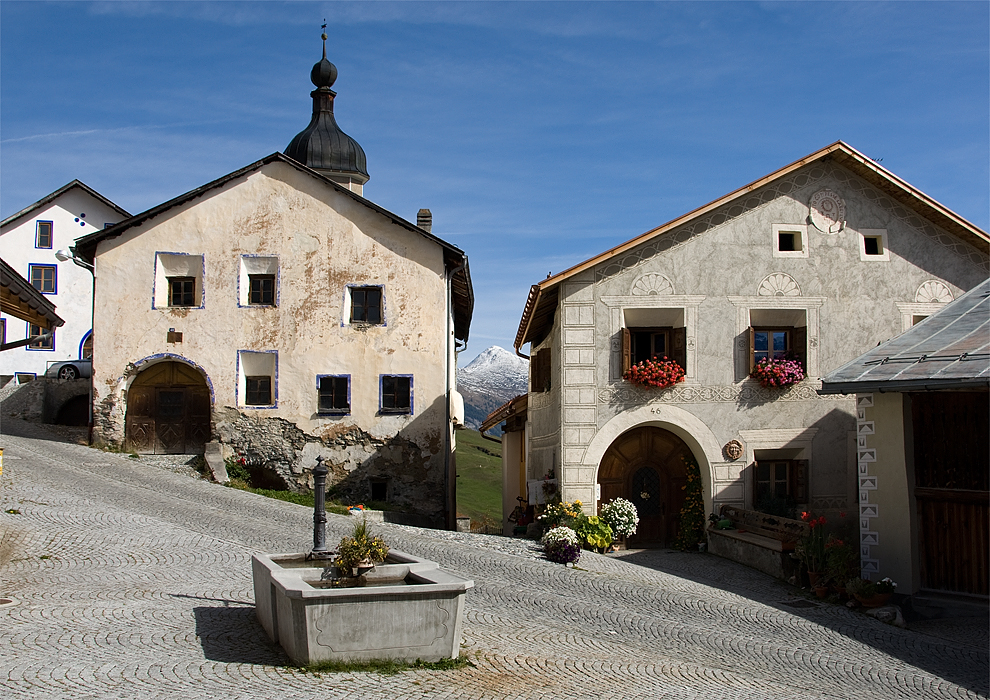
- Fountain in the village of Tschlin

- Flag Coat of arms
- Location of Valsot
- Location within Switzerland Location within Canton of Grisons
- Coordinates: 46°52′N 10°25′E
- Country: Switzerland
- Canton: Grisons
- District: Engiadina Bassa/Val Müstair

Area
  - Total: 158.95 km^{2} (61.37 sq mi)

Population (Dec 2013)
  - Total: 910
  - Density: 5.7/km^{2} (15/sq mi)
- Time zone: UTC+01:00 (CET)
  - Summer (DST): UTC+02:00 (CEST)
- Postal code: 7556, 7559
- SFOS number: 3764
- ISO 3166 code: CH-GR
- Localities: Martina (includes Vinadi), Seraplana, Strada (includes Chaflur) and Tschlin
- Surrounded by: Graun im Vinschgau (IT-BZ), Nauders (AT-7), Pfunds (AT-7), Samnaun, Spiss (AT-7)
- Website: https://www.valsot.ch SFSO statistics

Valsot is a municipality in the Engiadina Bassa/Val Müstair Region in the canton of the Grisons in the extreme east of Switzerland. On 1 January 2013 the municipalities of Ramosch and Tschlin merged to form the new municipality of Valsot.

== History ==
=== Ramosch ===
In 1956–58, on the hill Mottata (ca. 1.5 kilometers (0.93 mi) north-east of Ramosch), a significant prehistoric site was discovered. The Mottata site contains three settlement horizons, two from the mid and early Bronze Age (Laugen-Melaun/Luco-Meluno culture) and one from the early Iron Age (Fritzens-Sanzeno culture).

=== Tschlin ===
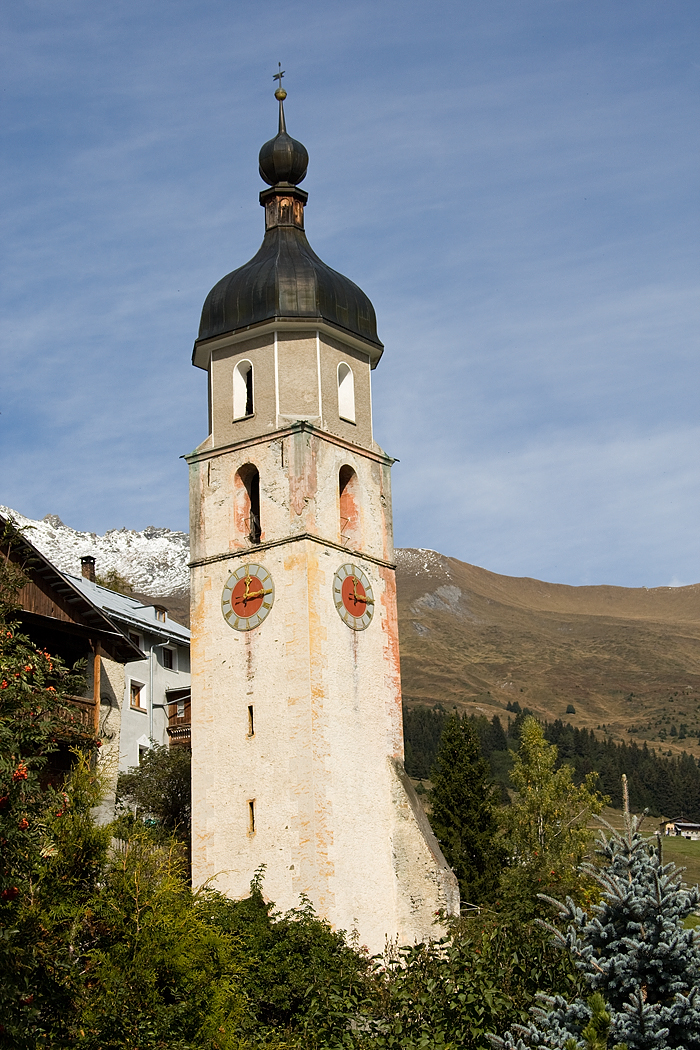
Tower of the Church of St. John the Baptist

While Bronze and Iron Age items have been found in Tschlin, the first mention of the village is in the 10th century. In the 10th century, bishop Hildibald gave the chapterhouse in Chur a gift of a farm house in Tschlin. In the High Middle Ages Tschlin was under the authority of Ramosch. The village church of St. Blasius was built in 1515 in the gothic style. In 1545 the Protestant Reformation reached the village and in 1574–82 the reformer and historian Ulrich Campell worked in Tschlin. In 1856 a fire destroyed much of the village, including the Church of St. John the Baptist. The church was not rebuilt, but the church tower is still visible in the village.

== Geography ==
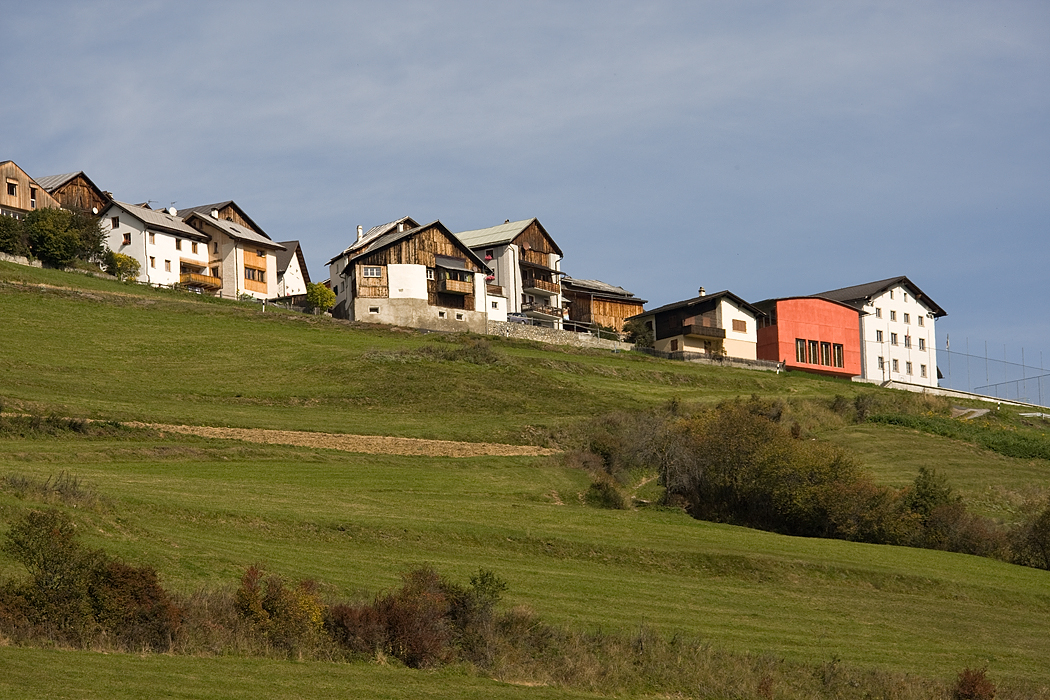
Tschlin village

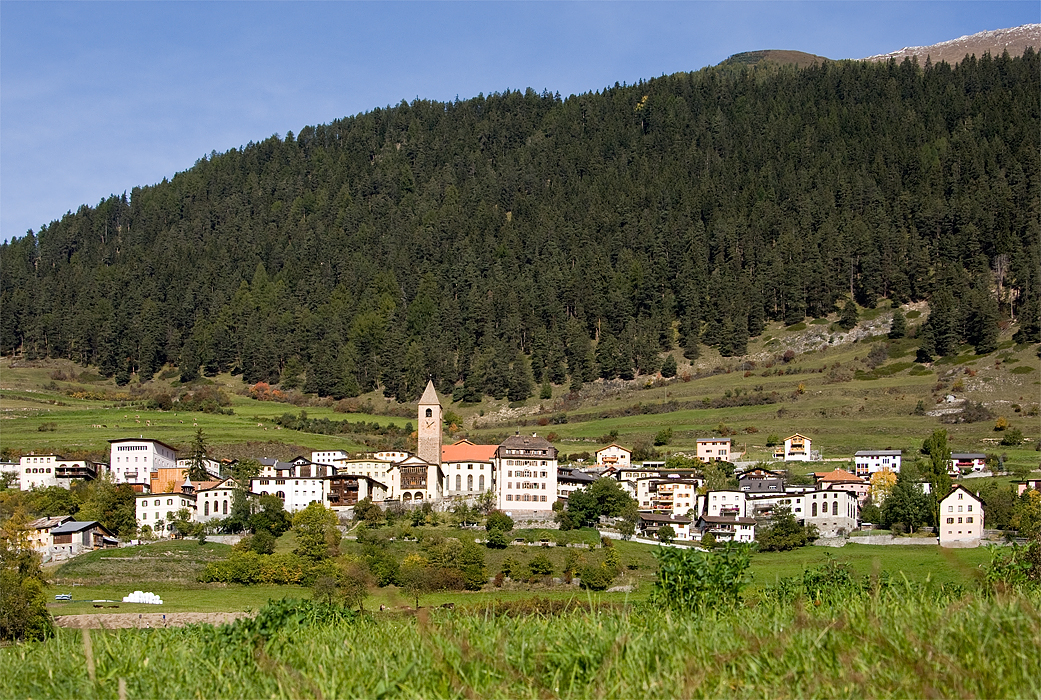
Ramosch village

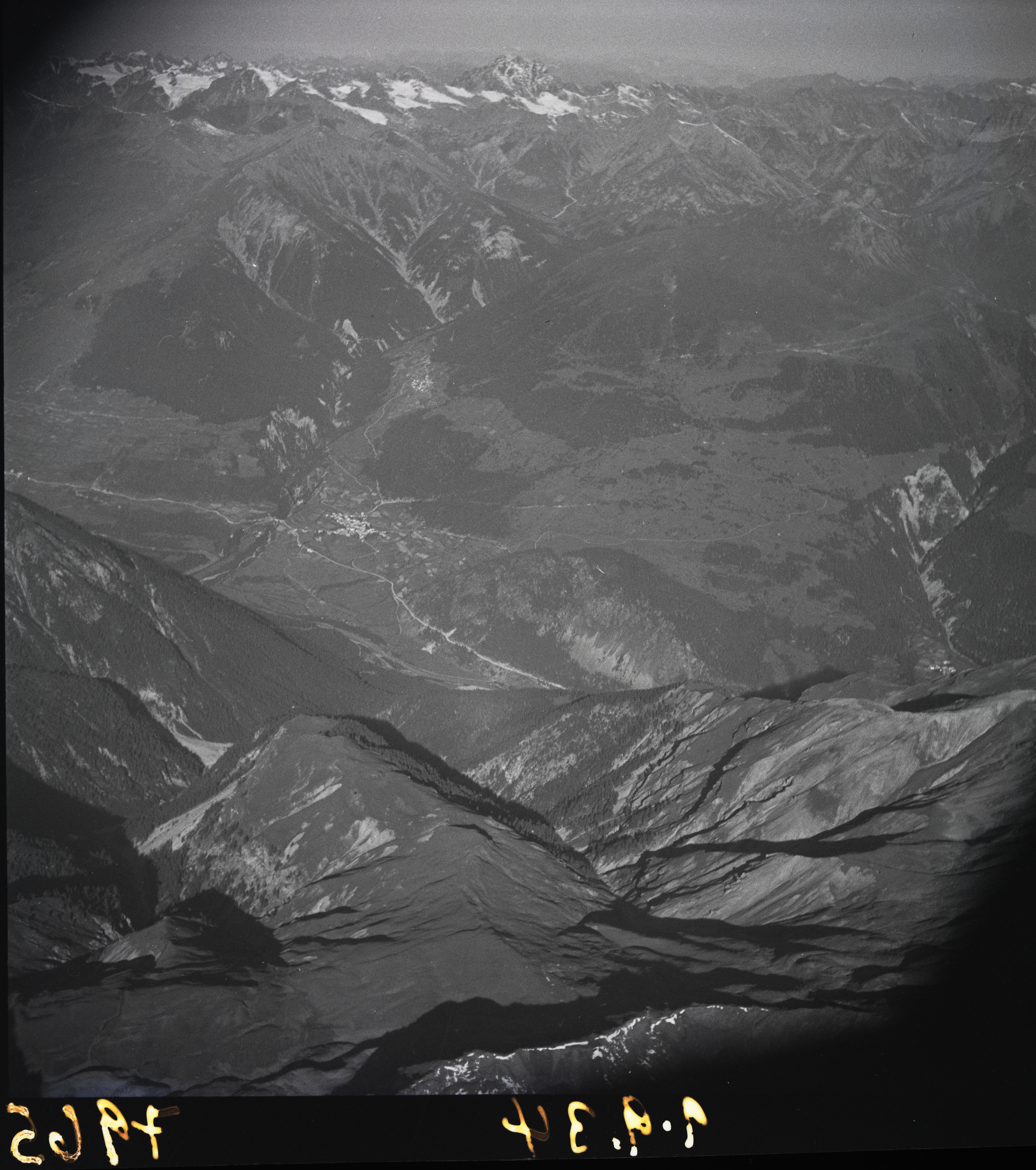
Aerial view by Walter Mittelholzer (1934)

Valsot has an area of 158.96 km^{2} (61.37 sq mi).

Ramosch had an area, as of 2006, of 84.1 km^{2} (32.5 sq mi). Of this area, 32.7% is used for agricultural purposes, while 26.5% is forested. Of the rest of the land, 0.7% is settled (buildings or roads) and the remainder (40.1%) is non-productive (rivers, glaciers or mountains). It is along the left bank of the Inn river. It consists of the village of Ramosch and the village section of Vnà as well as the settlements of Raschvella and Seraplana. Until 1943 Ramosch was known as Remüs.

Tschlin had an area, as of 2006, of 75.1 km^{2} (29.0 sq mi). Of this area, 28.7% is used for agricultural purposes, while 34.7% is forested. Of the rest of the land, 1.3% is settled (buildings or roads) and the remainder (35.3%) is non-productive (rivers, glaciers or mountains). It consists of the village of Tschlin on a terrace above the left bank of the Inn, the sections of Strada and Martina and the hamlets of San Niclà, Chaflur, Sclamischot and Vinadi. Until 1943 Tschlin was known as Schleins.

== Demographics ==
Valsot has a combined population (as of 31 December 2020) of 826.

== Historic population ==
The historical population is given in the following chart:

== Languages ==
Most of the population in Ramosch (as of 2000) speaks Romansh (84.1%), with German being second most common (13.9%) and Dutch being third (1.1%).

=== Ramosch ===
Languages in Ramosch
Languages	Census 1980		Census 1990		Census 2000	
Languages	Number	Percent	Number	Percent	Number	Percent
German	44	9.69%	59	13.35%	61	13.86%
Romansh	399	87.89%	363	82.13%	370	84.09%
Italian	9	1.98%	15	3.39%	2	0.45%
Population	454	100%	442	100%	440	100%

=== Tschlin ===
Most of the population of Tschlin (as of 2000) speaks Romansh (71.4%), with German being second most common (25.5%) and italian being third (1.0%).

Languages in Tschlin
Languages	Census 1980		Census 1990		Census 2000	
Languages	Number	Percent	Number	Percent	Number	Percent
German	64	14.85%	130	25.24%	100	25.51%
Romansh	362	83.99%	313	60.78%	280	71.43%
Italian	4	0.93%	33	6.41%	3	0.77%
Population	431	100%	515	100%	392	100%

== Heritage sites of national significance ==
Tschanüff Castle, the Mottata (a prehistoric settlement) and the Swiss Reformed Church of St. Florinus in Ramosch and the Museum Stamparia da Strada in Tschlin are listed as Swiss heritage sites of national significance.

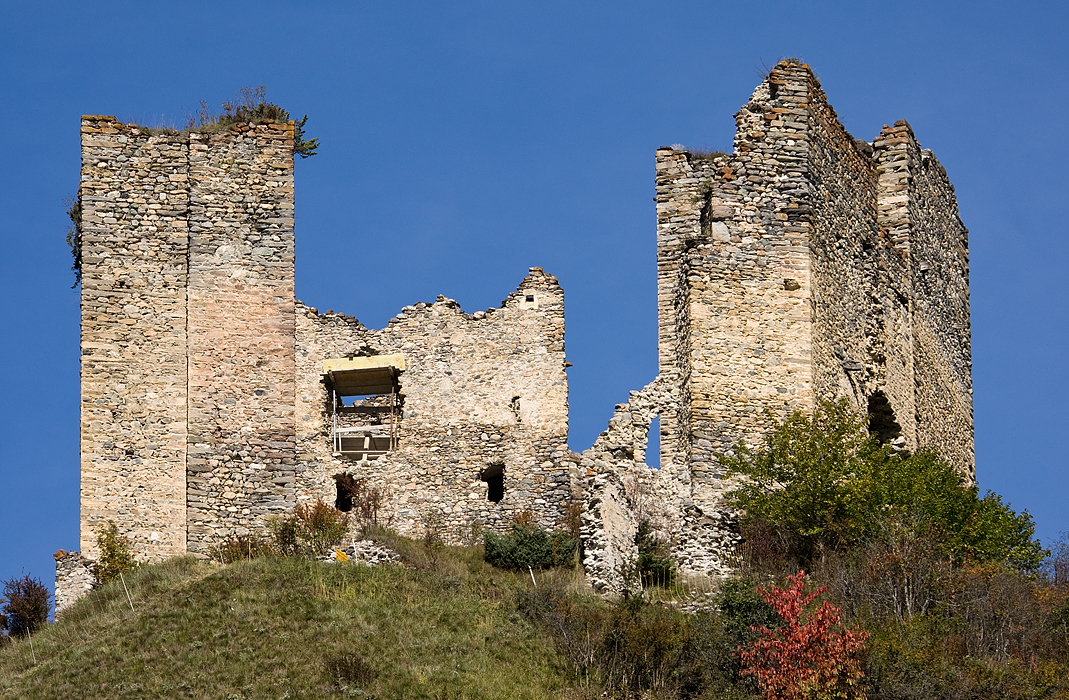
Castle Tschanüff

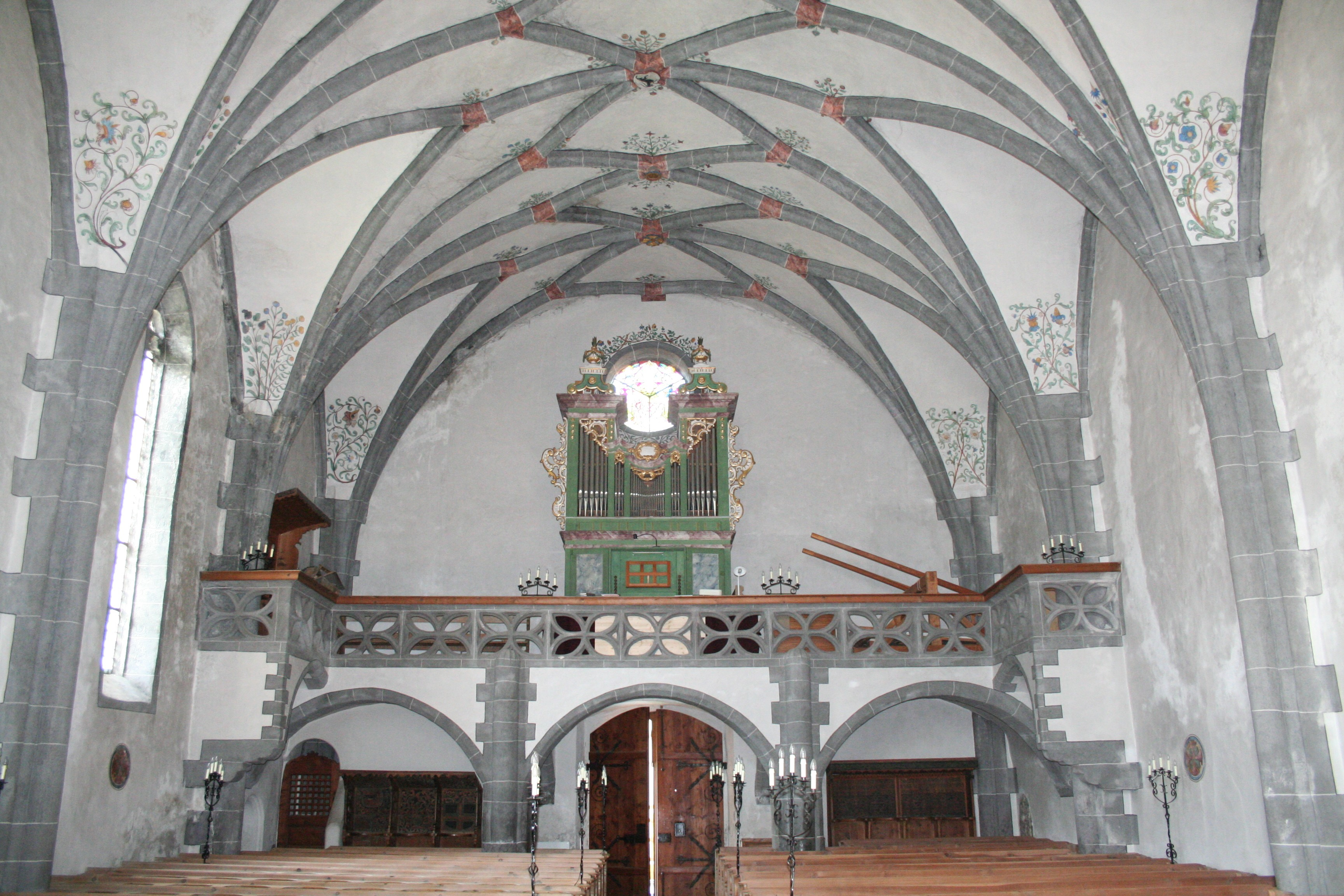
St. Florinus, looking down the nave

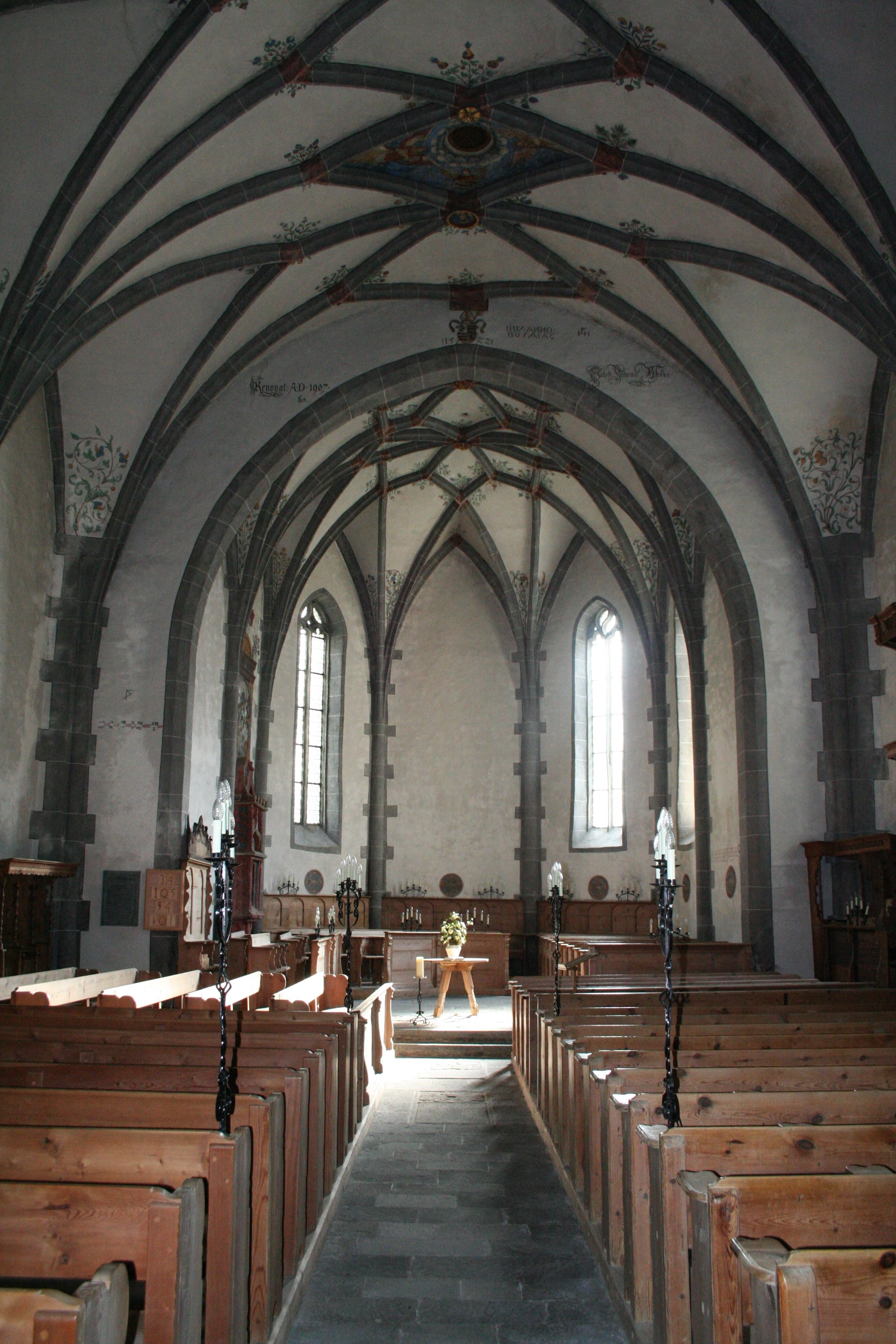
St. Florinus, looking toward the sanctuary

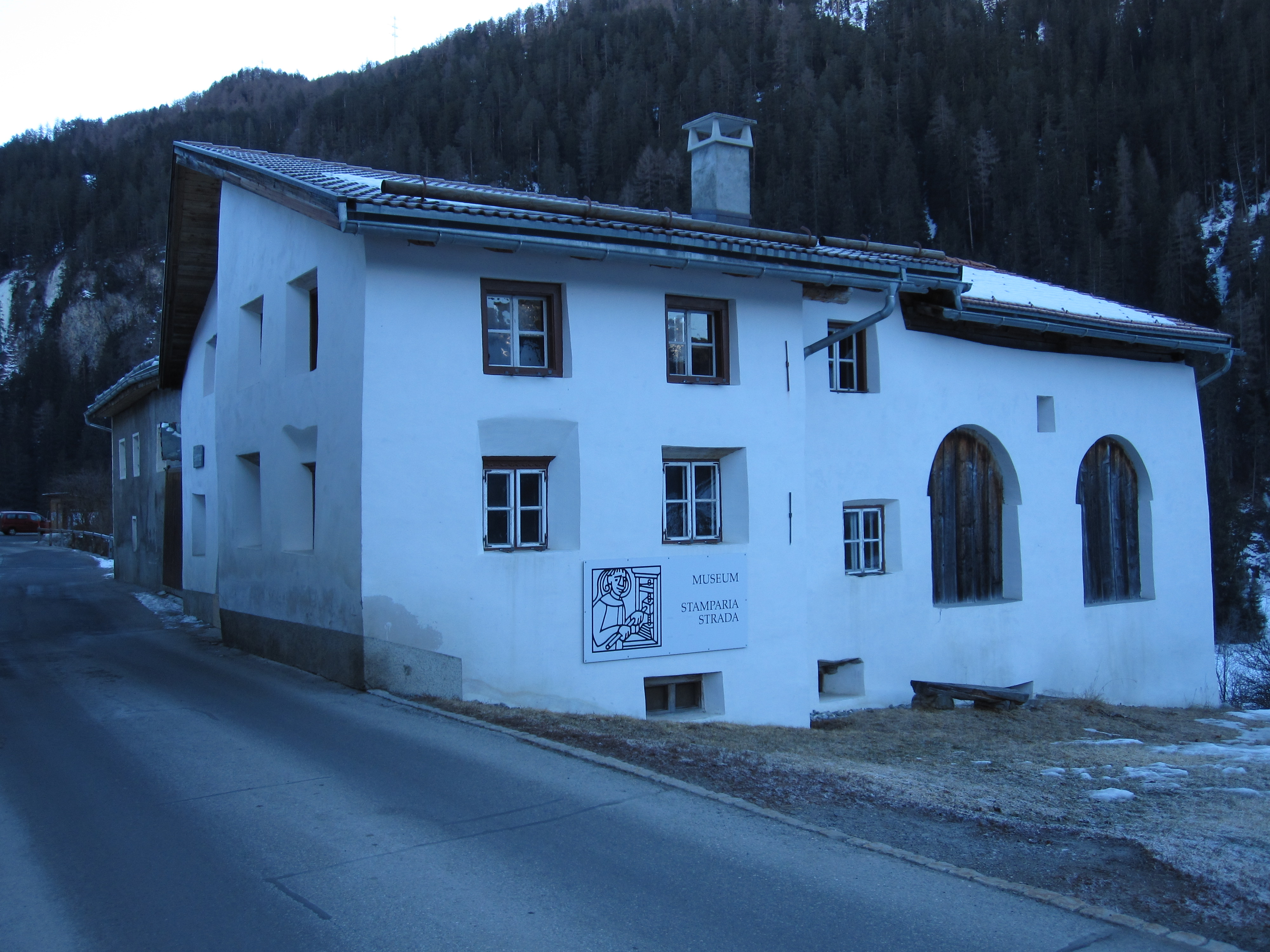
Museum Stamparia Da Strada
