= Samnaun =

- Municipality
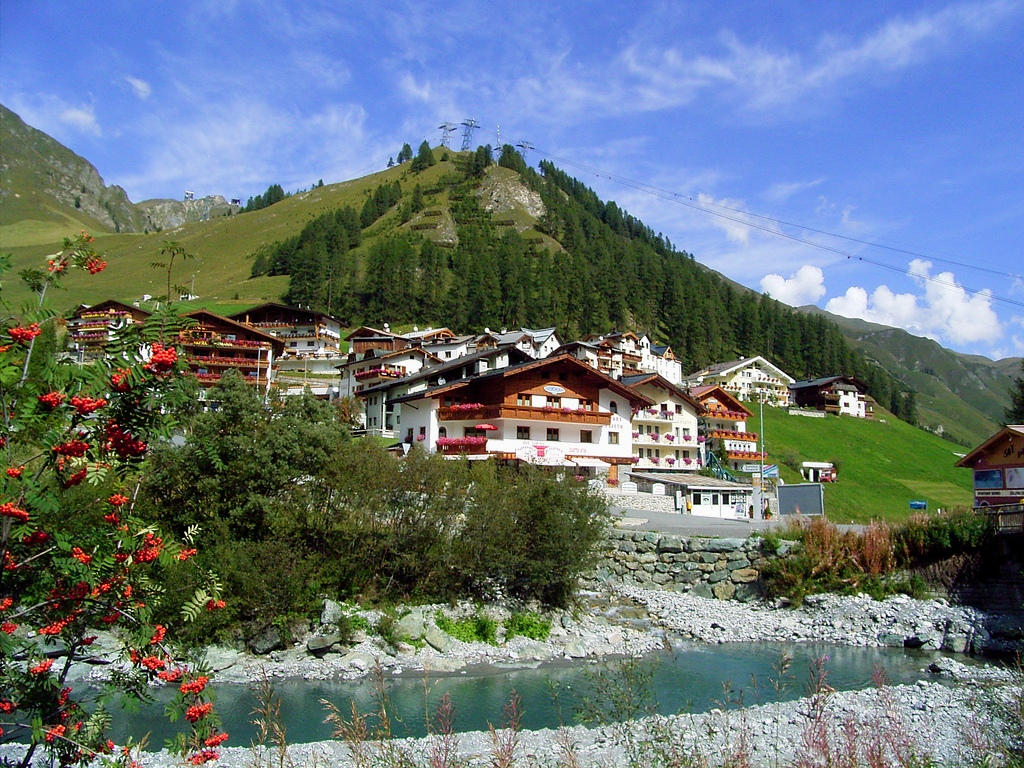

- Flag Coat of arms
- Location of Samnaun
- Location within Switzerland Location within Canton of Grisons
- Coordinates: 46°56′N 10°21′E
- Country: Switzerland
- Canton: Grisons
- District: Engiadina Bassa/Val Müstair

Area
  - Total: 56.18 km^{2} (21.69 sq mi)
- Elevation (Church): 1,844 m (6,050 ft)

Population (December 2020)
  - Total: 784
  - Density: 14.0/km^{2} (36.1/sq mi)
- Time zone: UTC+01:00 (CET)
  - Summer (DST): UTC+02:00 (CEST)
- Postal code: 7562-63
- SFOS number: 3752
- ISO 3166 code: CH-GR
- Localities: Compatsch, Laret, Plan, Ravaisch and Samnaun
- Surrounded by: Ischgl (AT-7), Kappl (AT-7), Ramosch, See (AT-7), Spiss (AT-7), Valsot
- Website: www.samnaun.swiss

Samnaun (Romansh: Samignun) is a high Alpine village and a valley at the eastern end of Switzerland and a municipality in the Engiadina Bassa/Val Müstair Region in the Swiss canton of the Grisons.

== History ==
The valley was first used as a seasonal mountain pasture for the villages of Tschlin and Ramosch. By 1220 the first permanent farm houses are mentioned. These farm houses and fields were given as a gift to the Marienberg Abbey by the counts of Tarasp in the 12th century.

== Geography ==
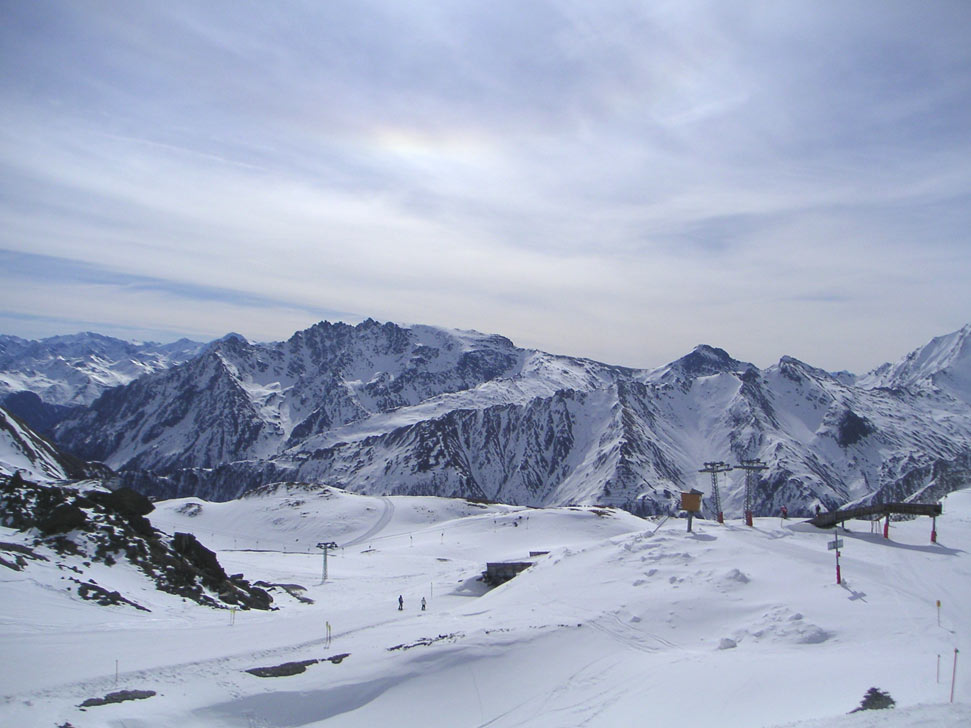
Ski area of Samnaun

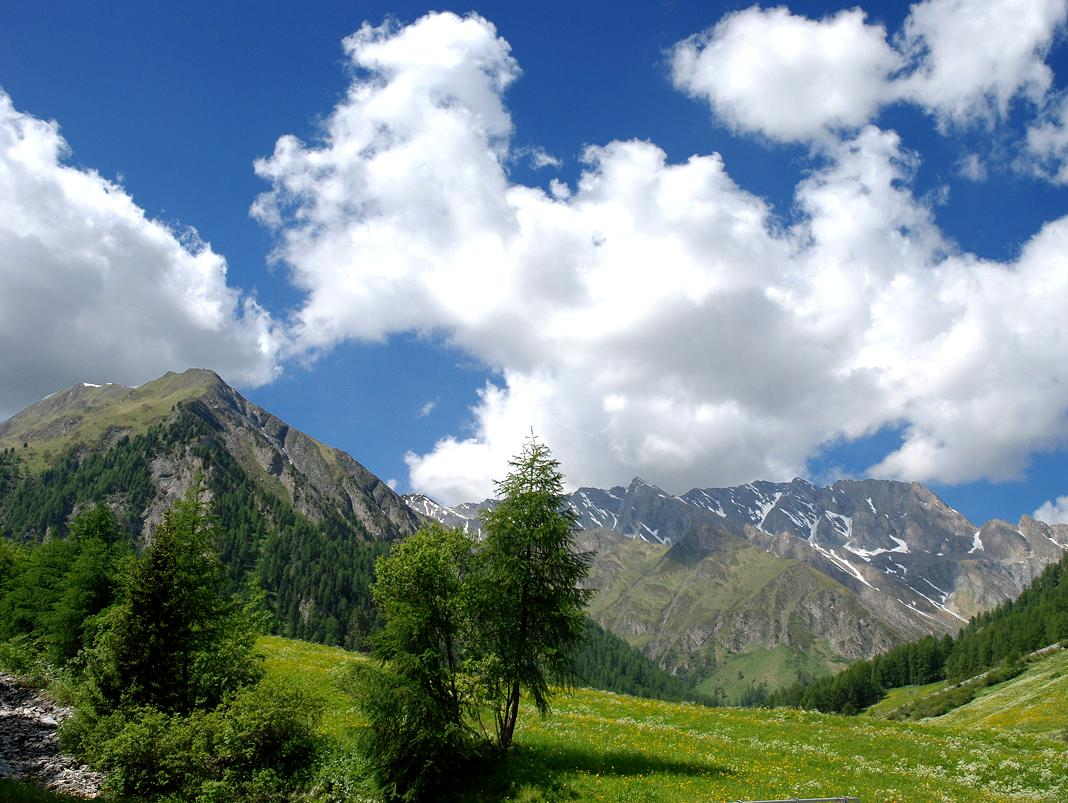
The Samnaun

Aerial view (1954)

As of 2006 Samnaun has an area of 56.2 km^{2} (21.7 sq mi). Of this area, 46.1% is used for agricultural purposes, while 11.7% is forested. Of the rest of the land, 0.9% is settled (buildings or roads) and the remainder (41.2%) is non-productive (rivers, glaciers or mountains).

Until 2017 it was part of the Ramosch sub-district, of the Inn district, after 2017 it was part of the Engiadina Bassa/Val Müstair Region. It is located in a left side valley of the Engadin valley, at an elevation of 1,700–1,840 meters (5,580–6,040 ft). It consists of five village sections; Compatsch, Laret, Plan (Plaun), Ravaisch and Samnaun.

== Customs exemption ==
In the 19th century, Samnaun could be reached by road only from Spiss in Austria. Thus Samnaun was excluded from the Swiss Customs Area. It retains a privileged 'duty-free' status, albeit not without controversy, in the twenty-first century. The exception was maintained even after a road was built in 1905 linking Samnaun to Martina, at the most eastern point of the Lower Engadine. In winters with exceptionally heavy snowfall that blocks the road, Samnaun at times can be reached only via Austria.

== Tourism ==
Samnaun shares a ski resort with the municipality of Ischgl in Tyrol, Austria.

The Silvretta Arena Samnaun / Ischgl ski area (located 1,400–2,875 m (4,593–9,432 ft) above sea level) has about 238 km (148 mi) of slopes. The ski resort has 44 ski lifts and cable cars as well as the world's first double-decker cable car with a capacity of 180 people.

Samnaun hosts a Santa Claus event each year since 2001.

== Demographics ==
Samnaun has a population (as of 31 December 2020) of 784. As of 2008, 19.2% of the population was made up of foreign nationals. Between 1999 and 2009 the population grew at a rate of 1%.

As of 2000, the gender distribution of the population was 49.1% male and 50.9% female. The age distribution, as of 2000, in Samnaun is; 267 children or 8.7% of the population are between 0 and 9 years old. 155 teenagers or 5.1% are 10 to 14, and 281 teenagers or 9.2% are 15 to 19. Of the adult population, 460 people or 15.0% of the population are between 20 and 29 years old. 541 people or 17.6% are 30 to 39, 462 people or 15.1% are 40 to 49, and 385 people or 12.5% are 50 to 59. The senior population distribution is 209 people or 6.8% of the population are between 60 and 69 years old, 189 people or 6.2% are 70 to 79, there are 103 people or 3.4% who are 80 to 89, and there are 17 people or 0.6% who are 90 to 99.

In the 2007 federal election the most popular party was the CVP which received 45.7% of the vote. The next three most popular parties were the SVP (29.2%), the FDP (15.5%) and the SPS (7.2%).

In Samnaun about 53.6% of the population (between age 25-64) have completed either non-mandatory upper secondary education or additional higher education (either university or a Fachhochschule).

Samnaun has an unemployment rate of 1.01%. As of 2005, there were 46 people employed in the primary economic sector and about 26 businesses involved in this sector. 52 people are employed in the secondary sector and there are 10 businesses in this sector. 743 people are employed in the tertiary sector, with 105 businesses in this sector.

The historical population is given in the following table:

year	population
1835	387
1850	313
1900	357
1950	424
2000	743
2010	808

== Languages ==
Most of the population (as of 2000) speaks German (93.5%), with Portuguese being second most common (1.7%) and Serbo-Croatian being third (1.6%). Uniquely within Switzerland, the form of German spoken by the residents of Samnaun is a variant of the Bavarian language. Until the second half of the nineteenth century the population spoke a dialect of Romansh close to Vallader.

Languages in Samnaun
Language	Census 1980		Census 1990		Census 2000	
Language	Number	Percent	Number	Percent	Number	Percent
German	569	95.31%	619	97.02%	695	93.54%
Romansh	4	0.67%	10	1.57%	6	0.81%
Italian	1	0.17%	3	0.47%	6	0.81%
Population	597	100%	638	100%	743	100%

== See also ==
- Campione d'Italia, an Italian enclave surrounded by Switzerland.
- Livigno in Italy, a duty-free area in Italy.
