= Ramosch =

- Former municipality
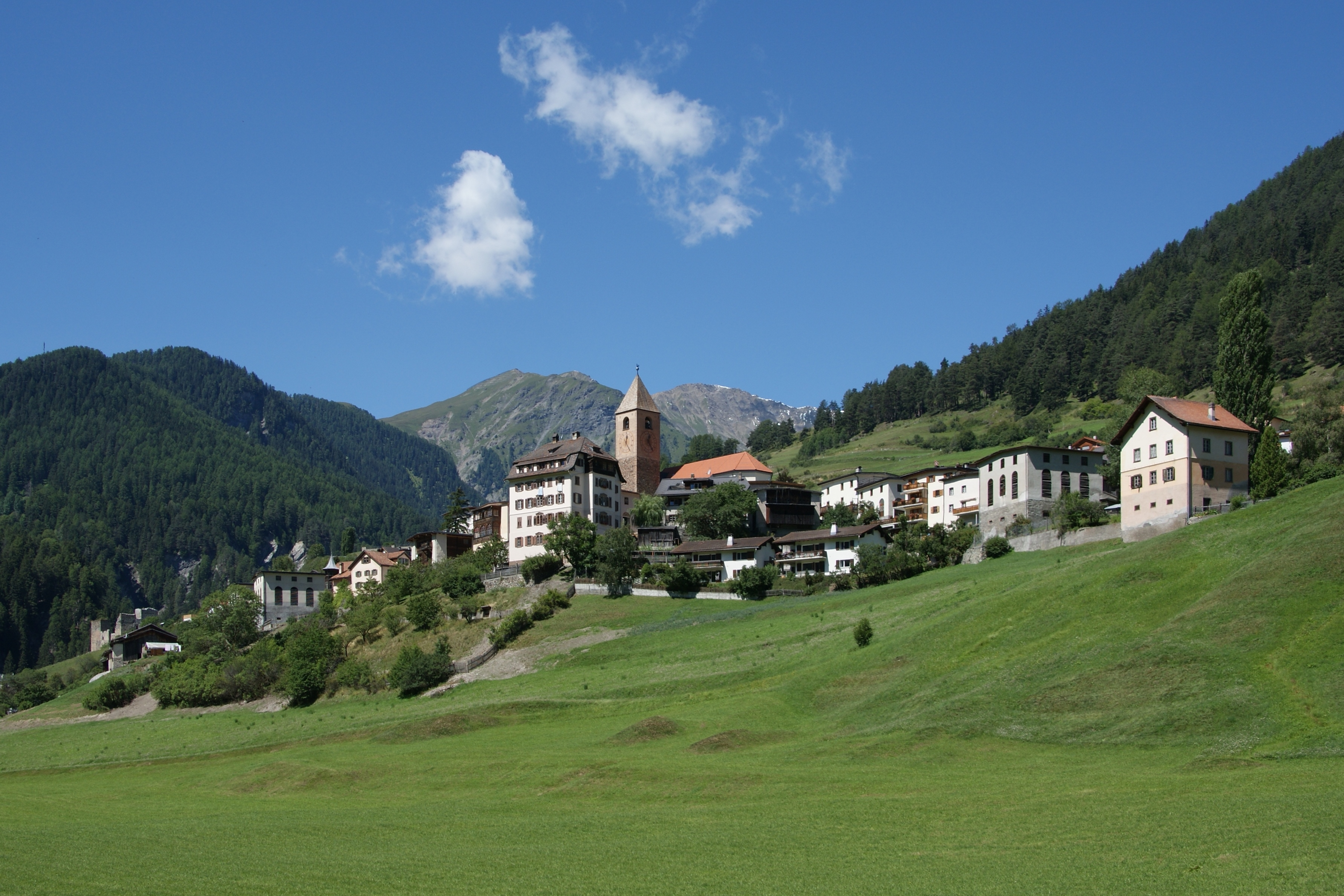

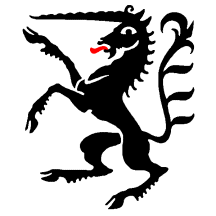
- Flag Coat of arms
- Location of Ramosch
- Location within Switzerland Location within Canton of Graubünden
- Coordinates: 46°50′N 10°23′E
- Country: Switzerland
- Canton: Graubünden
- District: Inn

Area
  - Total: 84.02 km^{2} (32.44 sq mi)
- Elevation: 1,236 m (4,055 ft)

Population (Dec 2012)
  - Total: 485
  - Density: 5.77/km^{2} (15.0/sq mi)
- Time zone: UTC+01:00 (CET)
  - Summer (DST): UTC+02:00 (CEST)
- Postal code: 7556
- SFOS number: 3751
- ISO 3166 code: CH-GR
- Surrounded by: Graun im Vinschgau (IT-BZ), Ftan, Galtür (AT-7), Ischgl (AT-7), Samnaun, Sent
- Website: www.ramosch.ch

Ramosch is a former municipality in the district of Inn in the Swiss canton of Graubünden. On 1 January 2013 the municipalities of Ramosch and Tschlin merged to form the new municipality of Valsot.

== History ==
In 1956-58, on the hill Mottata (ca. 1.5 kilometers (0.93 mi) north-east of Ramosch), a significant prehistoric site was discovered. The Mottata site contains three settlement horizons, two from the mid and early Bronze Age (Laugen-Melaun/Luco-Meluno culture) and one from the early Iron Age (Fritzens-Sanzeno culture).

== Geography ==
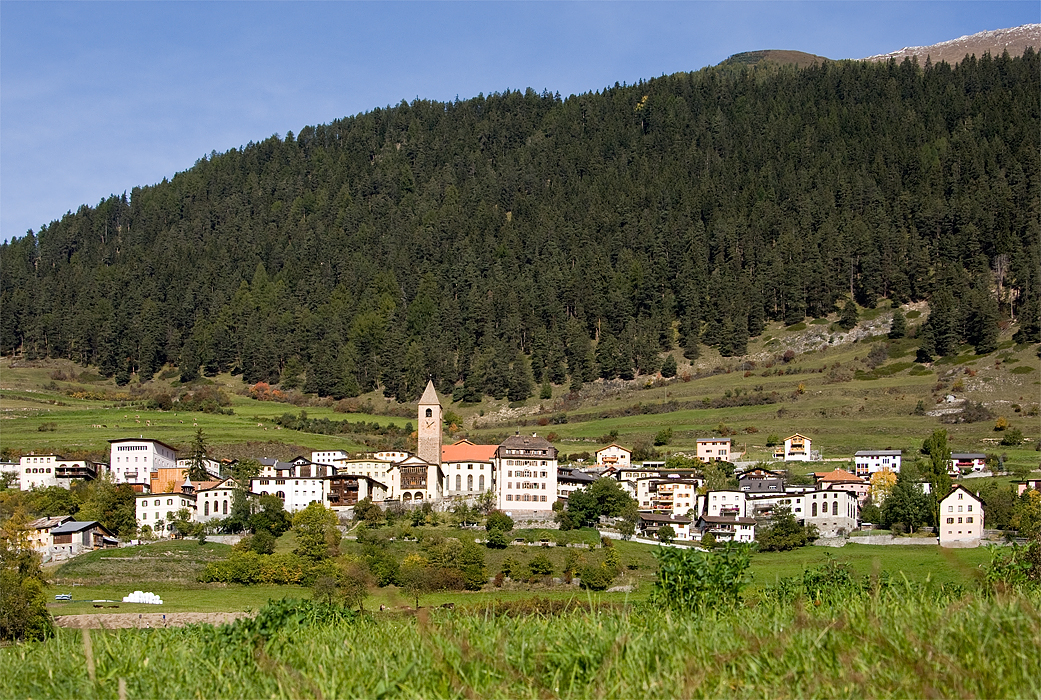
Ramosch village

Aerial view (1947)

Ramosch had an area, as of 2006, of 84.1 km^{2} (32.5 sq mi). Of this area, 32.7% is used for agricultural purposes, while 26.5% is forested. Of the rest of the land, 0.7% is settled (buildings or roads) and the remainder (40.1%) is non-productive (rivers, glaciers or mountains).

The former municipality was located in the Ramosch sub-district of the Inn district. It is along the left bank of the Inn river. It consists of the village of Ramosch and the village section of Vnà as well as the settlements of Raschvella and Seraplana.

Until 1943 Ramosch was known as Remüs.

== Demographics ==
Ramosch had a population (as of 2011) of 483. As of 2008, 7.4% of the population was made up of foreign nationals. Over the last 10 years the population has decreased at a rate of -0.6%.

As of 2000, the gender distribution of the population was 50.2% male and 49.8% female. The age distribution, as of 2000, in Ramosch is; 55 children or 12.5% of the population are between 0 and 9 years old. 34 teenagers or 7.7% are 10 to 14, and 29 teenagers or 6.6% are 15 to 19. Of the adult population, 37 people or 8.4% of the population are between 20 and 29 years old. 54 people or 12.3% are 30 to 39, 63 people or 14.3% are 40 to 49, and 54 people or 12.3% are 50 to 59. The senior population distribution is 42 people or 9.5% of the population are between 60 and 69 years old, 42 people or 9.5% are 70 to 79, there are 25 people or 5.7% who are 80 to 89, and there are 5 people or 1.1% who are 90 to 99.

In the 2007 federal election the most popular party was the SVP which received 45.6% of the vote. The next three most popular parties were the FDP (28.7%), the SPS (20%) and the CVP (5%).

In Ramosch about 59.6% of the population (between age 25-64) have completed either non-mandatory upper secondary education or additional higher education (either university or a Fachhochschule).

Ramosch has an unemployment rate of 0.62%. As of 2005, there were 51 people employed in the primary economic sector and about 22 businesses involved in this sector. 89 people are employed in the secondary sector and there are 10 businesses in this sector. 70 people are employed in the tertiary sector, with 19 businesses in this sector.

The historical population is given in the following table:

year	population
1835	681
1850	621
1900	558
1950	565
2000	440
2010	484

== Languages ==
Most of the population (as of 2000) speaks Romansh (84.1%), with German being second most common (13.9%) and Dutch being third ( 1.1%).

Languages in Ramosch
Languages	Census 1980		Census 1990		Census 2000	
Languages	Number	Percent	Number	Percent	Number	Percent
German	44	9.69%	59	13.35%	61	13.86%
Romansh	399	87.89%	363	82.13%	370	84.09%
Italian	9	1.98%	15	3.39%	2	0.45%
Population	454	100%	442	100%	440	100%

== Heritage sites of national significance ==
Tschanüff Castle, the Mottata (a prehistoric settlement) and the Swiss Reformed Church of St. Florinus are listed as Swiss heritage sites of national significance.

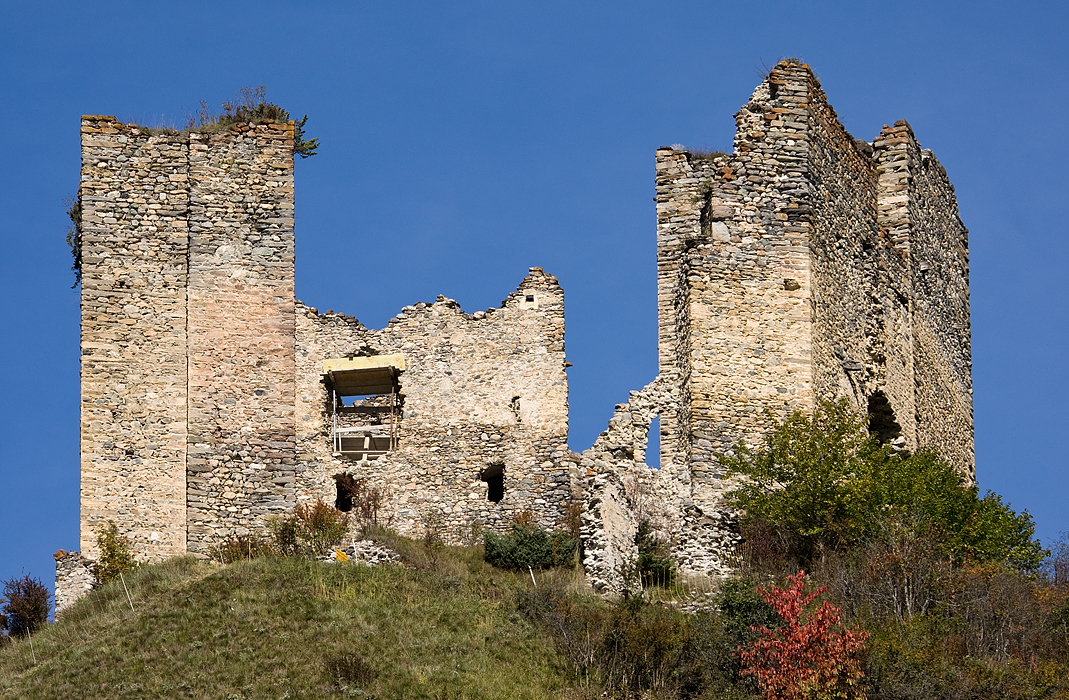
Castle Tschanüff

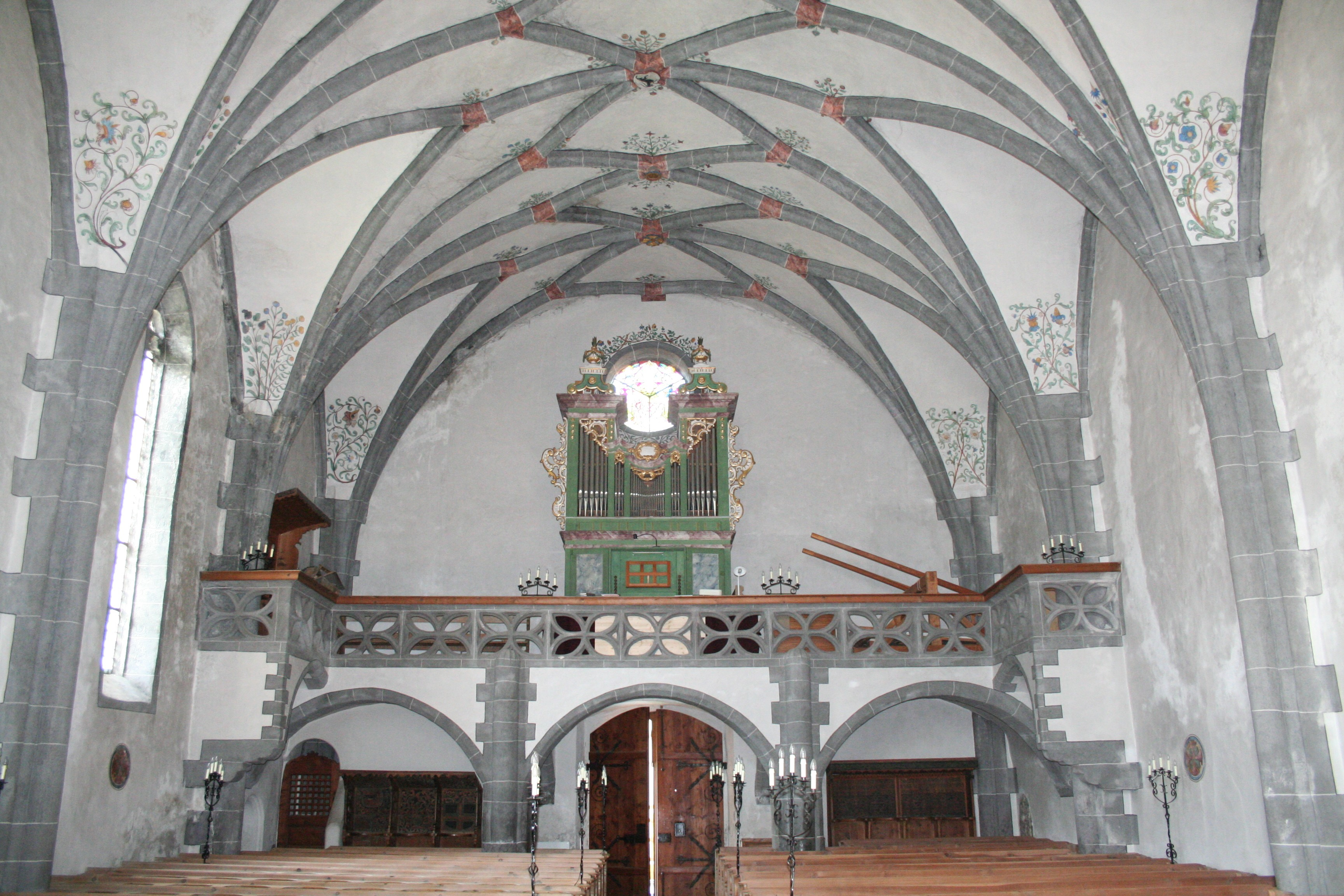
St. Florinus, looking down the nave

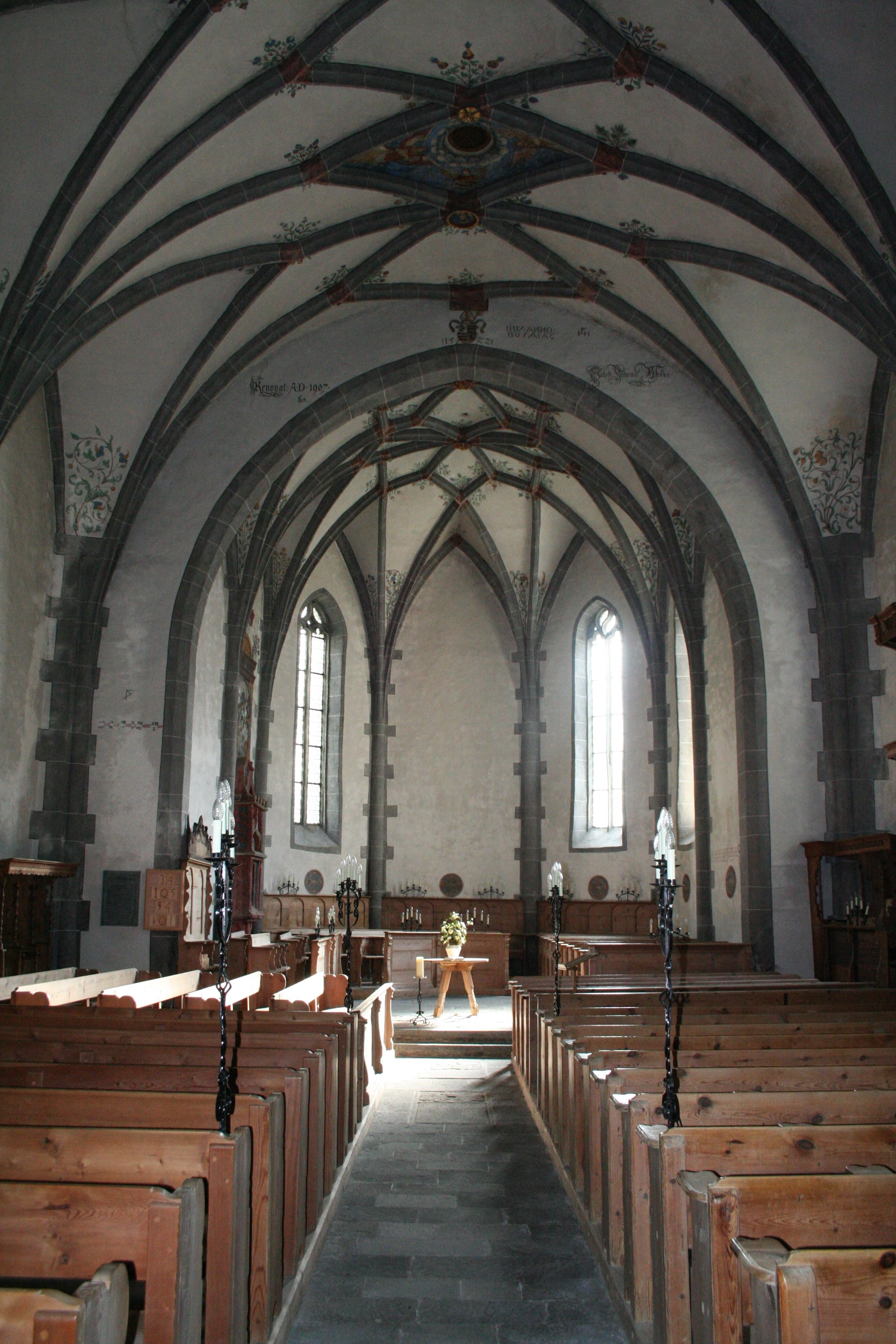
St. Florinus, looking toward the sanctuary
