= Engiadina Bassa/Val Müstair Region =

Coordinates: 46.78°N 10.26°E

Engiadina Bassa/Val Müstair Region Region Unterengadin/Münstertal (German) Regiun Engiadina Bassa/Val Müstair (Romansh)
- District
- Country: Switzerland
- Canton: Graubünden

Area
  - Total: 1,196.55 km^{2} (461.99 sq mi)

Population (2020)
  - Total: 9,163
  - Density: 7.658/km^{2} (19.83/sq mi)
- Time zone: UTC+1 (CET)
  - Summer (DST): UTC+2 (CEST)
- Municipalities: 5

Engiadina Bassa/Val Müstair Region is one of the eleven administrative districts in the canton of Graubünden in Switzerland. It had an area of 1,196.55 square kilometers (461.99 sq mi) and a population of 9,163 (as of 31 December 2020). It was created on 1 January 2017 as part of a reorganization of the Canton.

Municipalities in the Engiadina Bassa/Val Müstair Region
Municipality	Population (31 December 2020)	Area (km^{2})
Zernez	1,506	344.04
Samnaun	784	56.28
Scuol	4,624	438.63
Valsot	826	158.96
Val Müstair	1,423	198.64
