= Martina, Switzerland =

Coordinates: 46°53′N 10°28′E

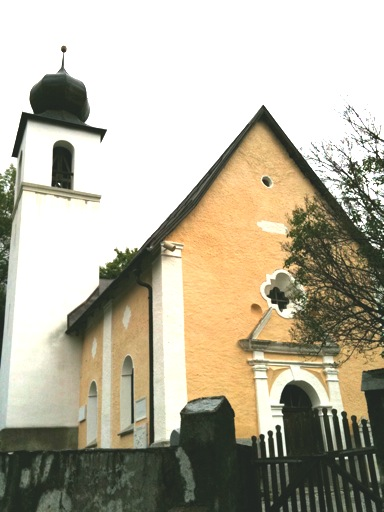
Reformed church of Martina

Martina (Romansh; rare German: Martinsbruck) is a village in the Lower Engadine valley, in Graubünden, Switzerland. Its border crossing leads to Nauders in Austria. The village was a part of the municipality of Tschlin, it's now a part of Valsot municipality.

The most common language spoken here is Vallader, the local dialect of Romansch.

Aerial view (1954)
