= Spiss =

- Municipality
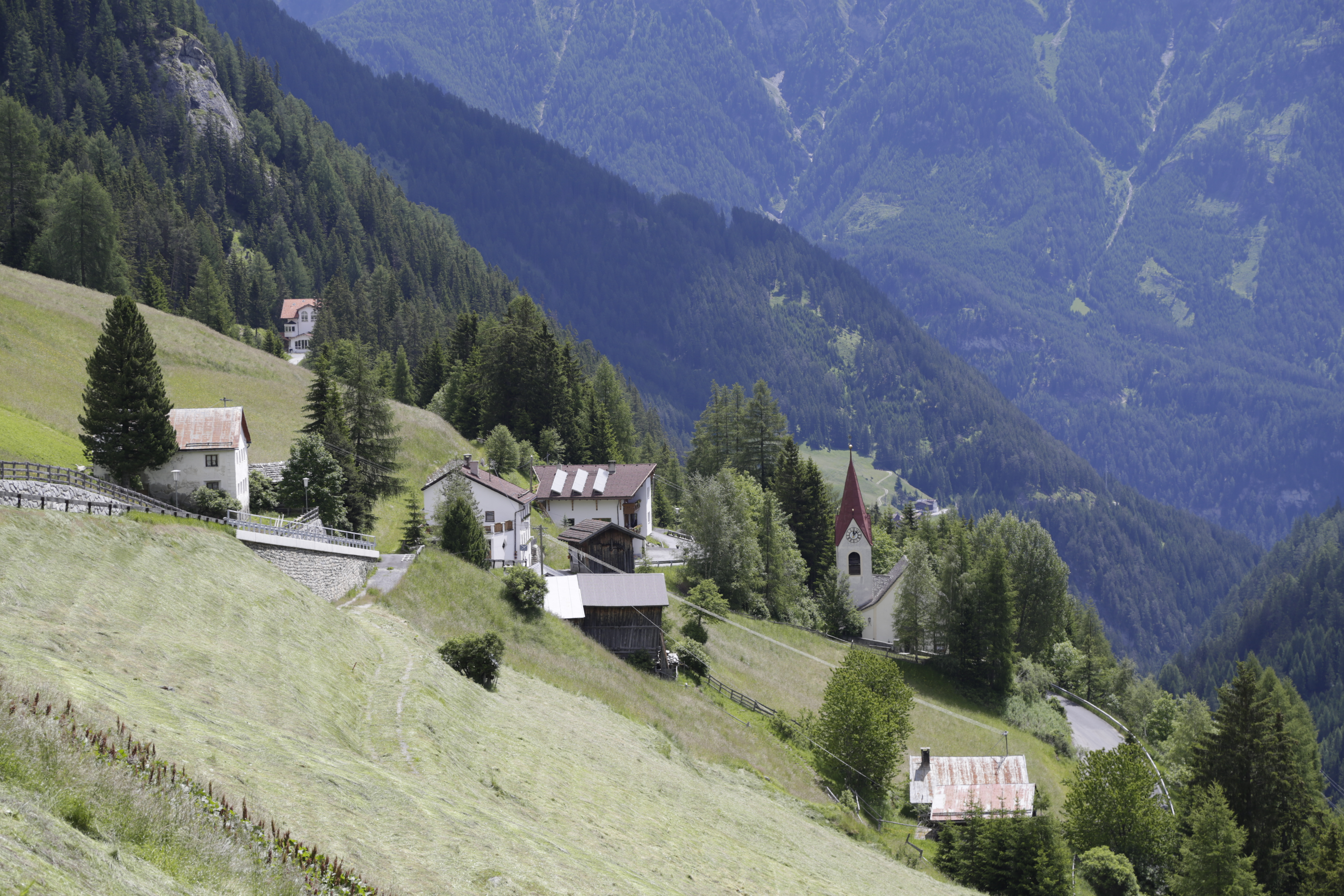
- View of Spiss

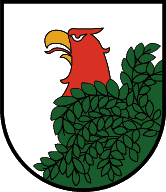
- Coat of arms

- Location within Austria Spiss (Austria)
- Coordinates: 46°57′33″N 10°25′53″E
- Country: Austria
- State: Tyrol
- District: Landeck

Government
  - Mayor: Richard Jäger

Area
  - Total: 24.57 km^{2} (9.49 sq mi)
- Elevation: 1,653 m (5,423 ft)

Population (2018-01-01)
  - Total: 114
  - Density: 4.64/km^{2} (12.0/sq mi)
- Time zone: UTC+1 (CET)
  - Summer (DST): UTC+2 (CEST)
- Postal code: 6542
- Area code: 05474
- Vehicle registration: LA
- Website: www.spiss.tirol.gv.at

Spiss is a municipality in the district of Landeck in the Austrian state of Tyrol located 22 km south of the city of Landeck at the border of Switzerland. It is one of the smallest communities in the district. Formerly a part of Nauders, it became its own municipality in 1547. The main sources of income nowadays are tourism and agriculture.
