= Nauders =

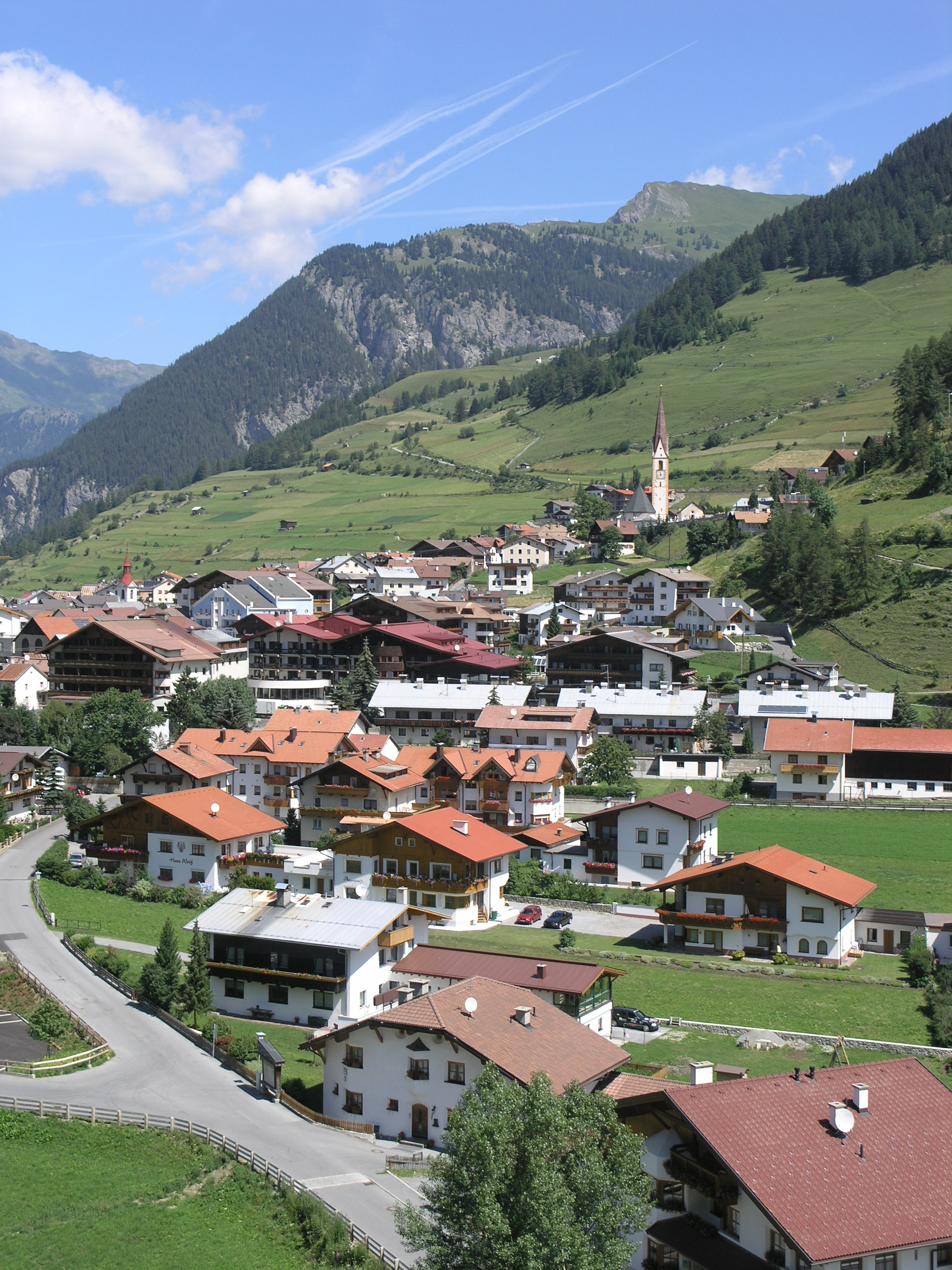

- Coat of arms

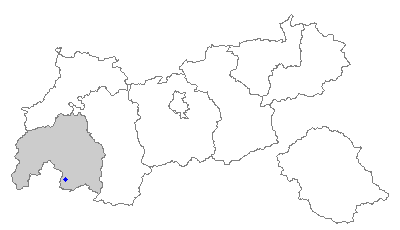
- Location of Nauders within Tyrol

- Location within Austria
- Coordinates: 46°53′33″N 10°30′14″E
- Country: Austria
- State: Tyrol
- District: Landeck

Government
  - Mayor: Helmut Spöttl

Area
  - Total: 90.31 km^{2} (34.87 sq mi)
- Elevation: 1,394 m (4,573 ft)

Population (2021)
  - Total: 1,543
  - Density: 17.09/km^{2} (44.25/sq mi)
- Time zone: UTC+1 (CET)
  - Summer (DST): UTC+2 (CEST)
- Postal code: 6543
- Area code: 05473
- Vehicle registration: LA
- Website: www.nauders.tirol.gv.at

Nauders (Romansh: Danuder) is a municipality in the district of Landeck in the Austrian state of Tyrol.

== Geography ==
The town lies in the valley of the Stillebach (a tributary of the Inn) in the Ötztal Alps, at an altitude of 1,394 m (4,573 ft). It is located about 29 km (18 mi) south of the district capital Landeck, on the road that leads from Pfunds in the Inntal valley via the narrow Finstermünz Gorge up to Reschen Pass and the border with the Vinschgau region in South Tyrol, Italy. Nearby is the tripoint with the Swiss border; in the west, a road leads into the Sesvenna Alps and to Martina in the Lower Engadin valley.

=== Climate ===
Climate data for Nauders (1971–2000)
Month	Jan	Feb	Mar	Apr	May	Jun	Jul	Aug	Sep	Oct	Nov	Dec	Year
Record high °C (°F)	9.9 (49.8)	16.1 (61.0)	19.0 (66.2)	20.8 (69.4)	27.0 (80.6)	30.0 (86.0)	31.6 (88.9)	31.7 (89.1)	27.4 (81.3)	23.0 (73.4)	19.5 (67.1)	11.2 (52.2)	31.7 (89.1)
Mean daily maximum °C (°F)	0.5 (32.9)	2.4 (36.3)	6.2 (43.2)	9.9 (49.8)	15.2 (59.4)	18.5 (65.3)	21.3 (70.3)	20.9 (69.6)	17.2 (63.0)	11.9 (53.4)	4.9 (40.8)	0.9 (33.6)	10.8 (51.4)
Daily mean °C (°F)	−4.1 (24.6)	−3.2 (26.2)	0.4 (32.7)	4.1 (39.4)	9.0 (48.2)	11.9 (53.4)	14.3 (57.7)	13.9 (57.0)	10.5 (50.9)	6.0 (42.8)	0.0 (32.0)	−3.2 (26.2)	5.0 (41.0)
Mean daily minimum °C (°F)	−7.6 (18.3)	−7.1 (19.2)	−3.7 (25.3)	−0.4 (31.3)	4.1 (39.4)	6.6 (43.9)	8.8 (47.8)	8.8 (47.8)	5.8 (42.4)	2.0 (35.6)	−3.3 (26.1)	−6.3 (20.7)	0.6 (33.1)
Record low °C (°F)	−24.6 (−12.3)	−20.8 (−5.4)	−21.0 (−5.8)	−10.5 (13.1)	−7.8 (18.0)	−1.1 (30.0)	0.3 (32.5)	−0.3 (31.5)	−4.8 (23.4)	−10.0 (14.0)	−18.4 (−1.1)	−22.0 (−7.6)	−24.6 (−12.3)
Average precipitation mm (inches)	42.3 (1.67)	36.6 (1.44)	37.5 (1.48)	35.3 (1.39)	64.8 (2.55)	84.3 (3.32)	100.0 (3.94)	91.9 (3.62)	63.7 (2.51)	49.5 (1.95)	48.6 (1.91)	41.1 (1.62)	695.6 (27.39)
Average snowfall cm (inches)	43.9 (17.3)	56.3 (22.2)	36.3 (14.3)	18.4 (7.2)	3.3 (1.3)	0.1 (0.0)	0.0 (0.0)	0.4 (0.2)	0.1 (0.0)	6.5 (2.6)	27.9 (11.0)	46.5 (18.3)	239.7 (94.4)
Average precipitation days (≥ 1.0 mm)	6.3	5.5	6.1	6.6	9.7	11.4	12.1	11.5	8.5	6.7	7.3	6.8	98.5
Average relative humidity (%) (at 14:00)	69.2	59.2	52.2	51.8	52.2	52.9	51.5	54.2	54.3	56.9	62.0	66.4	56.5
Mean monthly sunshine hours	89.9	117.9	145.4	149.1	168.2	159.8	194.8	192.7	168.2	147.6	94.7	62.1	1,690.4
Percentage possible sunshine	51.4	52.0	49.5	45.6	45.6	43.7	52.0	54.3	55.5	55.1	45.7	47.8	49.9
Source: Central Institute for Meteorology and Geodynamics

== History ==
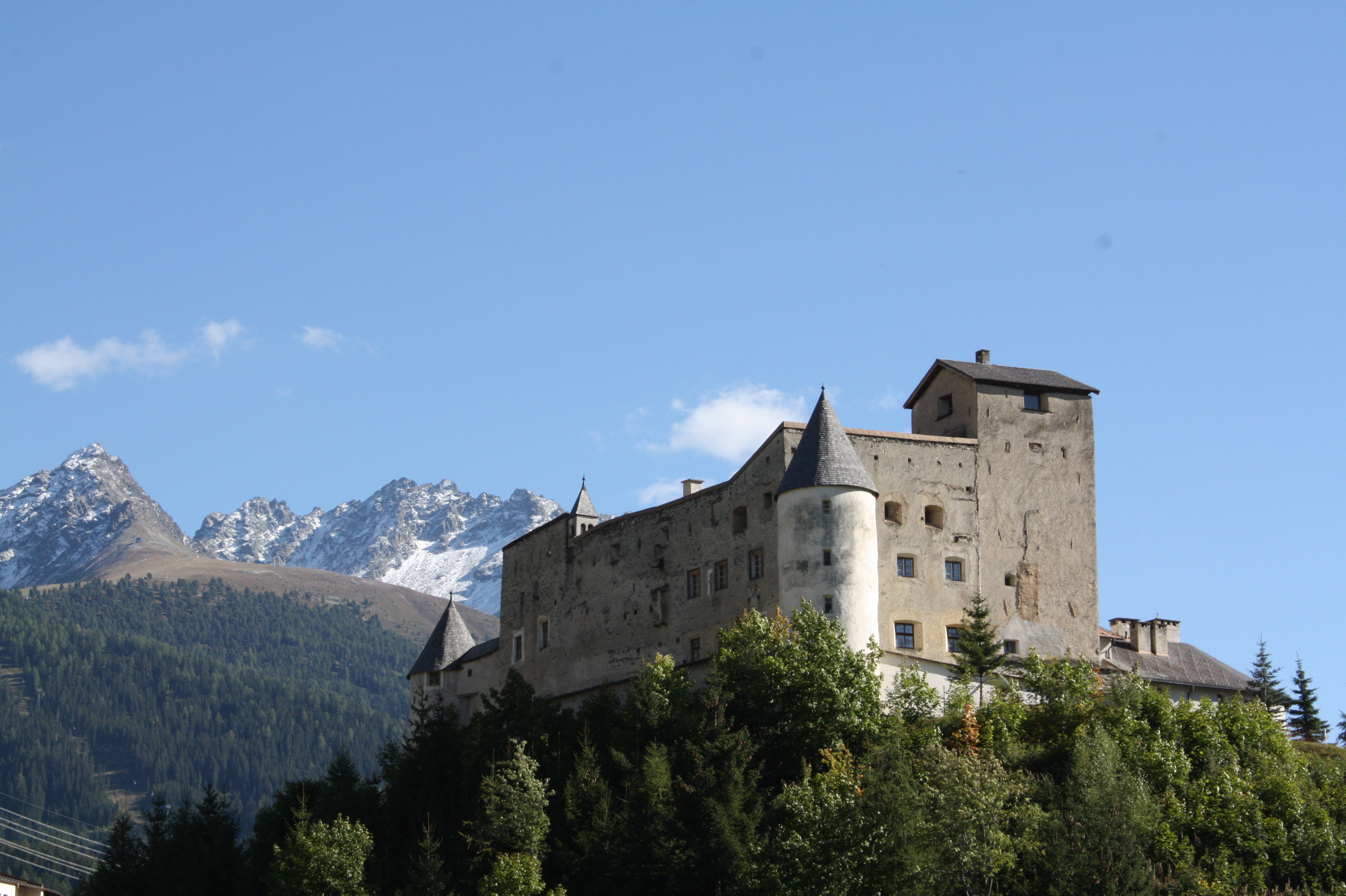
Naudersberg Castle

In ancient times, the trade route across Reschen Pass was part of the Roman Via Claudia Augusta, leading from Italy across the Eastern Alps to the Raetian capital Augusta Vindelicorum (Augsburg). Nauders is probably located at the site of a mansio called Inutrium in contemporary sources. From 200 AD onwards, however, the significance of the road connection faded, when it was gradually superseded by the Brenner Pass road in the east.

The Nudres parish itself was first mentioned in an 1150 deed; from the 13th century it housed an important customs station. Over the centuries, numerous conflicts arose in the border area of the Tyrolean lands, held by the Austrian House of Habsburg from 1363, with the Swiss Confederacy, culminating in the Swabian War of 1499. Nauders, then part of the Tyrolean Vinschgau region in the south was administered from Naudersberg Castle, a medieval fortress erected in the early 14th century. In 1472 the Habsburg archduke Sigismund of Austria had the Finstermünz fortress erected in the narrow gorge of the Inn river.

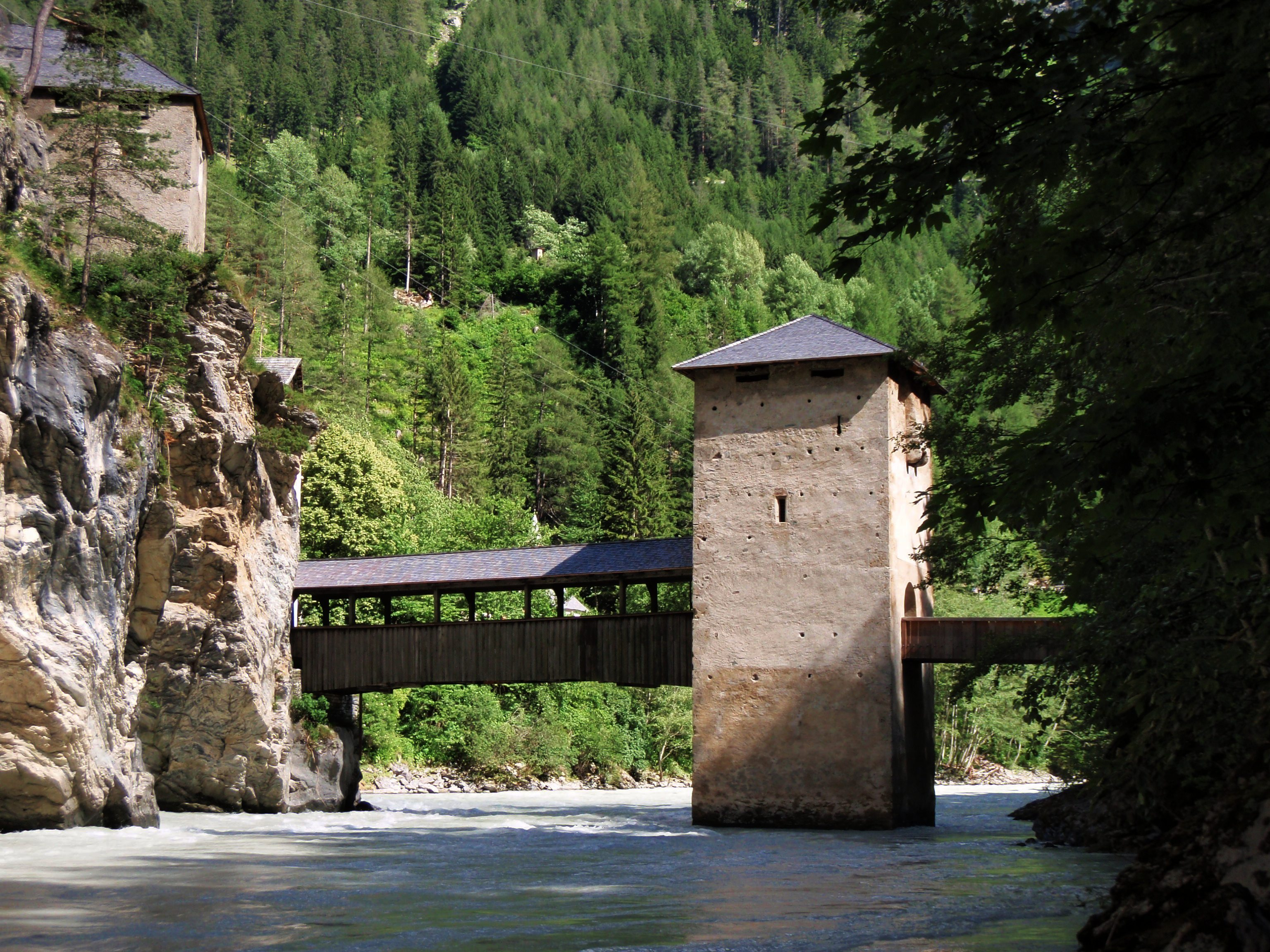
Finstermünz

Finstermünz finally lost its function when a new mountain road up to the Nauders high valley was laid out according to plans by Karl von Ghega in 1854. The Austrian authorities had the Hochfinstermünz Fortress erected on the new road into the Inntal valley instead, modelled on Franzensfeste Fortress and the federal fortress in Rastatt and manned by k.k. Landesschützen detachments.

At the end of World War II, numerous Nazi officials such as Eduard Roschmann and Oswald Menghin fled on a ratline through Nauders and Reschen Pass to escape arrest.

== Notable people ==
- Karl von Blaas (1815–1894), painter
- Ernst Hairer (born 1949), mathematician
