= Pfunds =

- Municipality
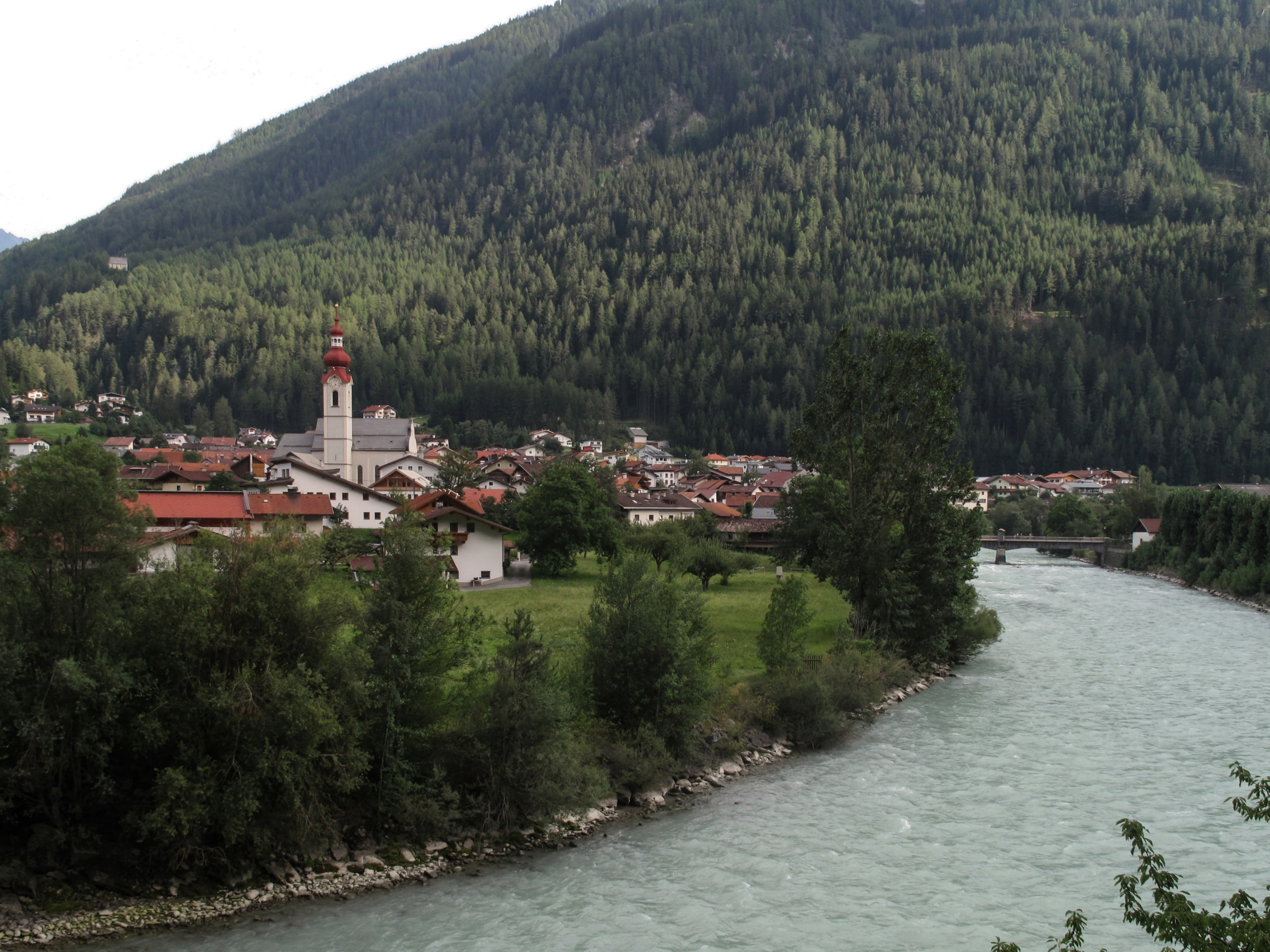

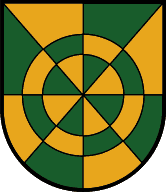
- Coat of arms

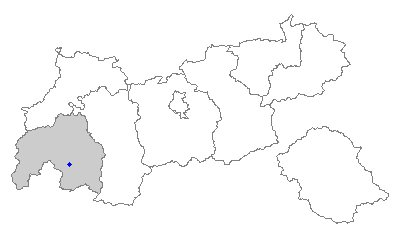
- Location within Tyrol

- Location within Austria
- Coordinates: 46°58′00″N 10°33′00″E
- Country: Austria
- State: Tyrol
- District: Landeck

Government
  - Mayor: Melanie Zerlauth

Area
  - Total: 140.53 km^{2} (54.26 sq mi)
- Elevation: 970 m (3,180 ft)

Population (2018-01-01)
  - Total: 2,602
  - Density: 18.52/km^{2} (47.96/sq mi)
- Time zone: UTC+1 (CET)
  - Summer (DST): UTC+2 (CEST)
- Postal code: 6542
- Area code: 05474
- Vehicle registration: LA
- Website: www.pfunds.tirol.gv.at

Pfunds is a municipality in the district of Landeck in the Austrian state of Tyrol located 19.7 km south of the city of Landeck and 5 km north of the border to Switzerland. It is close to the international tripoint with Italy to the south (Vinschgau).

The village was first mentioned in documents in 1282. The main source of income is tourism.

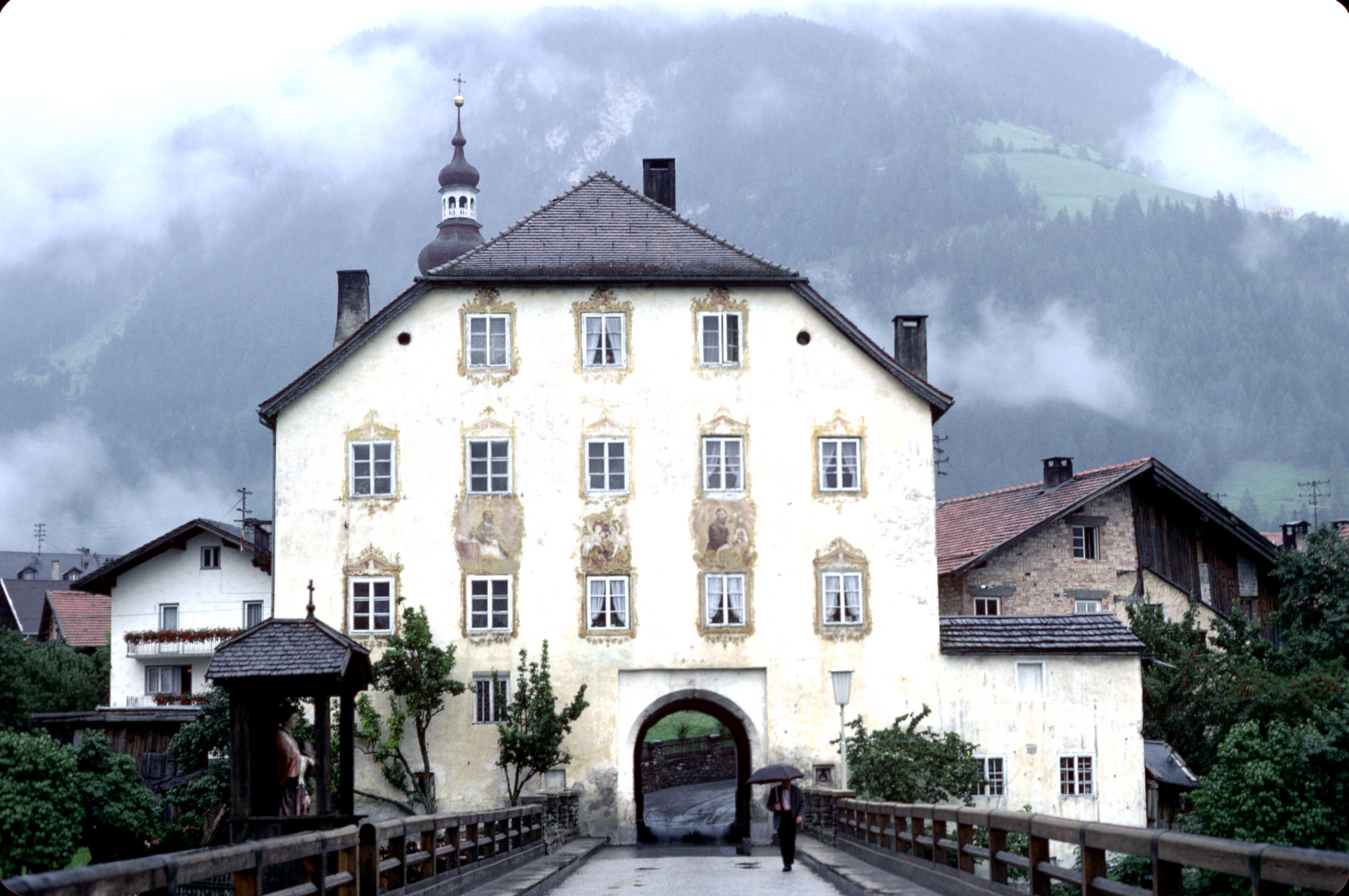
Pfunds, the old bridge and the tower house

== Geography ==
=== Populated places ===
The municipality of Kirchdorf consists of the following populated places; the first two are villages while the rest are hamlets.

- Pfunds-Stuben
- Pfunds-Dorf
- Airsch
- Birkach
- Greit
- Hinterkobel
- Kobl
- Lafairs
- Margreid
- Mariastein
- Rauth
- Schönegg
- Stein
- Vorderkobel
- Wand

== See also ==
- Austria–Switzerland border
