= Tschanüff Castle =

Ruined castle in Switzerland

- Remüs; Ruine Tschanüff
- Ramosch, Valsot
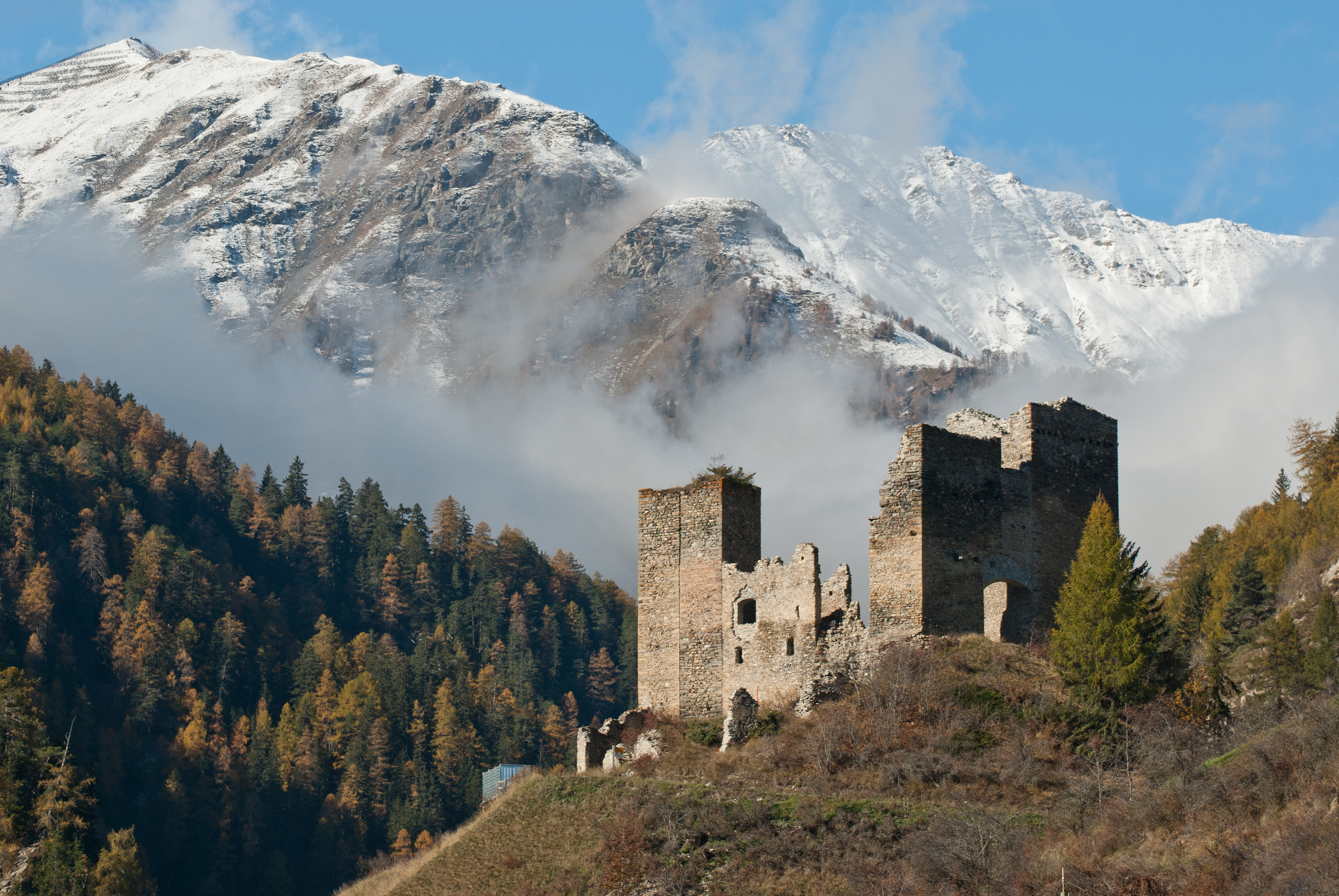
- Tschanüff Castle, with Piz Spadla in the background

Site information
- Type: hill castle
- Code: CH-GR
- Condition: ruin

Location
- Coordinates: 46°49′58.50″N 10°22′32.22″E
- Height: 1,240 m above the sea

Site history
- Built: 12th century

Garrison information
- Occupants: Ministerialis

Tschanüff Castle is a ruined castle in the former municipality of Ramosch (now Valsot) of the Canton of Graubünden in Switzerland. It is a Swiss heritage site of national significance.

== History ==
The Lords of Ramosch first appear in historical records in the 12th century. They were vassals of the Bishop of Chur and the Lords of Tarasp. The oldest part of the castle is the main tower, which was built as a bergfried (a fighting tower without permanent inhabitants) in the 12th century for the Lords of Ramosch. A ring wall was added in the 13th century. On 12 March 1256 Count Meinhard of Tyrol granted the knight Nannes of Ramosch the right to build a castle at Ramosch. Since there was already a fortification, this permission was probably to expand the small tower into a much larger castle. The new castle allowed the Ramosch family to control trade and taxes throughout the Lower Engadine.

On 19 August 1317 Nannes and his brother Johannes split the fief into two shares. The successors of Johannes, Conrad, and Schweiker, quarreled with each other over their inheritance. The conflict grew until in 1365 Duke Leopold of Austria was forced to intervene. The agreement between the brothers stated that they both accepted the Dukes of Austria as their overlord, the castle was to remain open to the Dukes and if they quarreled again the castle and surrounding lands would become the property of Austria. Despite the severe conditions, Conrad and Schweiker quickly began fighting again and in 1367 Schweiker murdered Conrad and fled Tschanüff. As a sign of appreciation for his service in an Austrian war in Italy, the Duke appointed Ulrich of Matsch as the owner of Tschanüff. The Matsch family took possession of the castle on 17 February 1369.

The Bishop of Chur also had a claim on the castle and fearing Austria's growing influence in the region, began reasserting his claim. In 1394 Bishop Hartmann forced the Lords of Matsch to give up the castle. However, in the following year, Matsch attacked and plundered the castle but retreated when the Bishop led an army toward Ramosch. In 1421 a peace treaty gave the castle to the Bishop and the Lords of Matsch were paid 2500 marks for their losses. The Bishops then appointed vogts to rule over the valley for the following centuries. In 1468 the castle was attacked by the League of God's House during a conflict with the Bishop. It may have been besieged during the Hennenkreig in 1475. During the Swabian War of 1499, the Bishop's own troops burned the castle to prevent it from falling into the Emperor's hands. In 1565 rebels against the Bishop attacked, plundered, and burned the outer ward. The Lower Engadine residents were found liable for the damage and ordered to pay to rebuild the castle.

Until the 16th century, the castle was known as Ramosch or Remüs after the Lords of Ramosch. In the 16th century it began to be known as Tschanüff which was Romansh for Casa nova or New House. This was to distinguish it from the nearby Serviezel Castle.

During the Bündner Wirren in 1622, the castle was captured and burned by troops from Glarus. It was quickly repaired and survived the rest of the tumult without being destroyed. Over the next century and a half the castle was once again used as the residence of the Bishop's appointed representative. In 1780 it was abandoned after part of the castle was destroyed in a landslide.

== Castle site ==
The complex consists of the main castle with its tower, residential tract, and secondary buildings surrounded by a ring wall and a southern outer ward which is surrounded by another ring wall in varying thickness. The two parts were connected by the gateway, through which a vaulted passage led into the courtyard of the main castle. Numerous masonry joints and differences in the wall structure indicate that the building must have taken place in several stages. The oldest part is part of the ring wall on the southeast which may date to before 1200. The main tower to the north may be from before 1200 or the early 13th century. In the early 13th century, the ring wall and parts of the southern residential tract were added. The bergfried still has five floors with a high entrance on the fourth floor on the south side. Since the masonry of the tower is not connected to the surrounding walls, these must be more recent.

The building south of the tower could be reached via the high entrance. There are holes for wooden beams at a height of four floors and towards the south the remains of an unusually thick wall. To the west is the southern tract from the 15th century, a four-storey, cross-divided building. The barrel vaults of the lower storeys are partly collapsed. On the third floor was a hall with a wooden ceiling, above it was a fighting platform with crenelations. The individual rooms were accessible from the courtyard side.

To the north of this wing was a recent building, of which only a few remains of the wall have been preserved. The south wing was completed by an older shield wall with a thickness of 3 meters (9.8 ft), which was probably reinforced in the age of the firearms to twice the thickness. Together, the two walls now form a massive tower-shaped block with no interior divisions.

West of the main tower was a two-storey building dating from around 1500, Erwin Poeschel believed it to have been a kitchen or smithy, on the upper floor living quarters. The remains of a sgraffito decoration have been preserved in exterior plastering. Window openings in the western wall of the enclosure point to an original continuation to the west; However, these parts of the building collapsed during landslides.

== Gallery ==
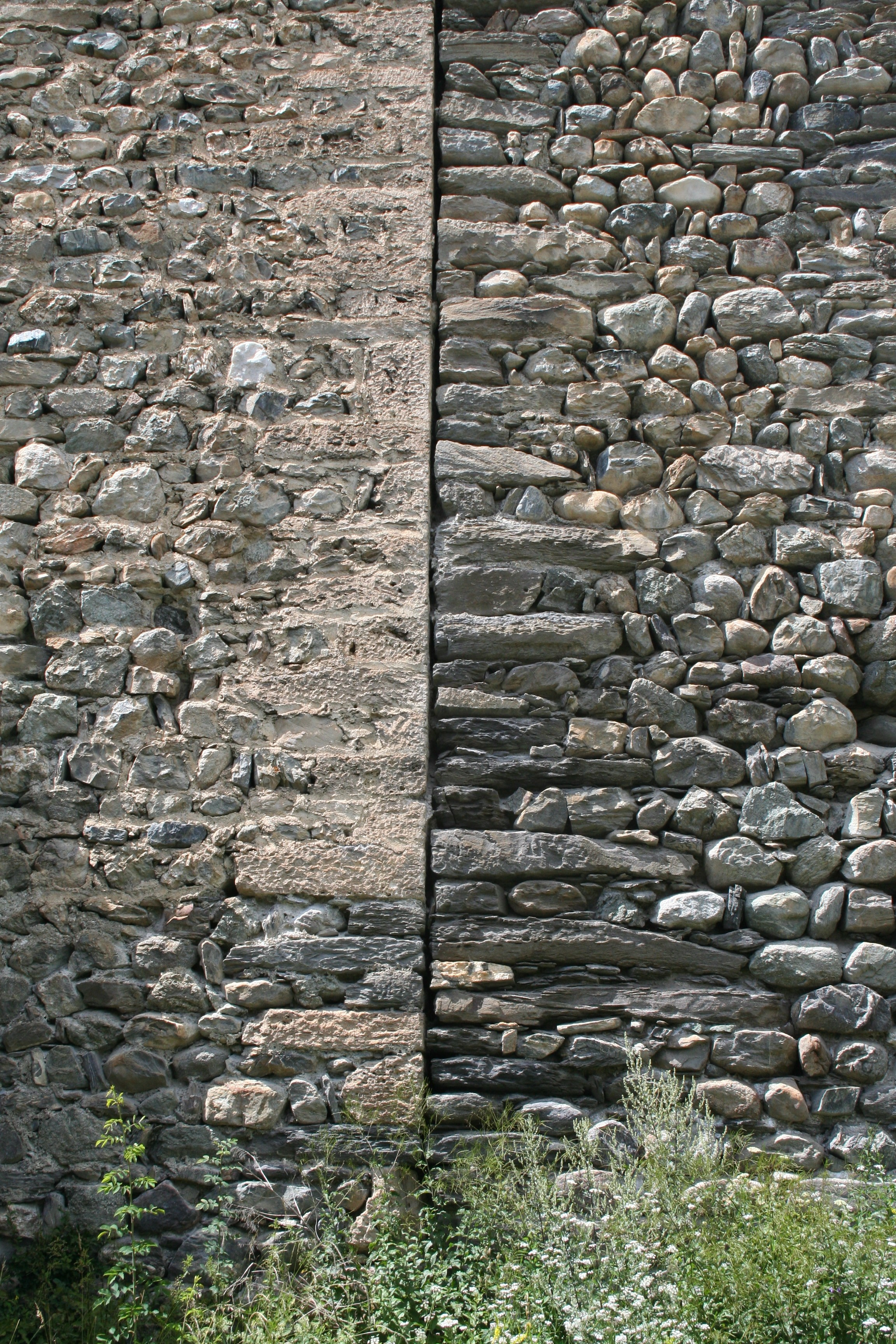
Space between the two walls

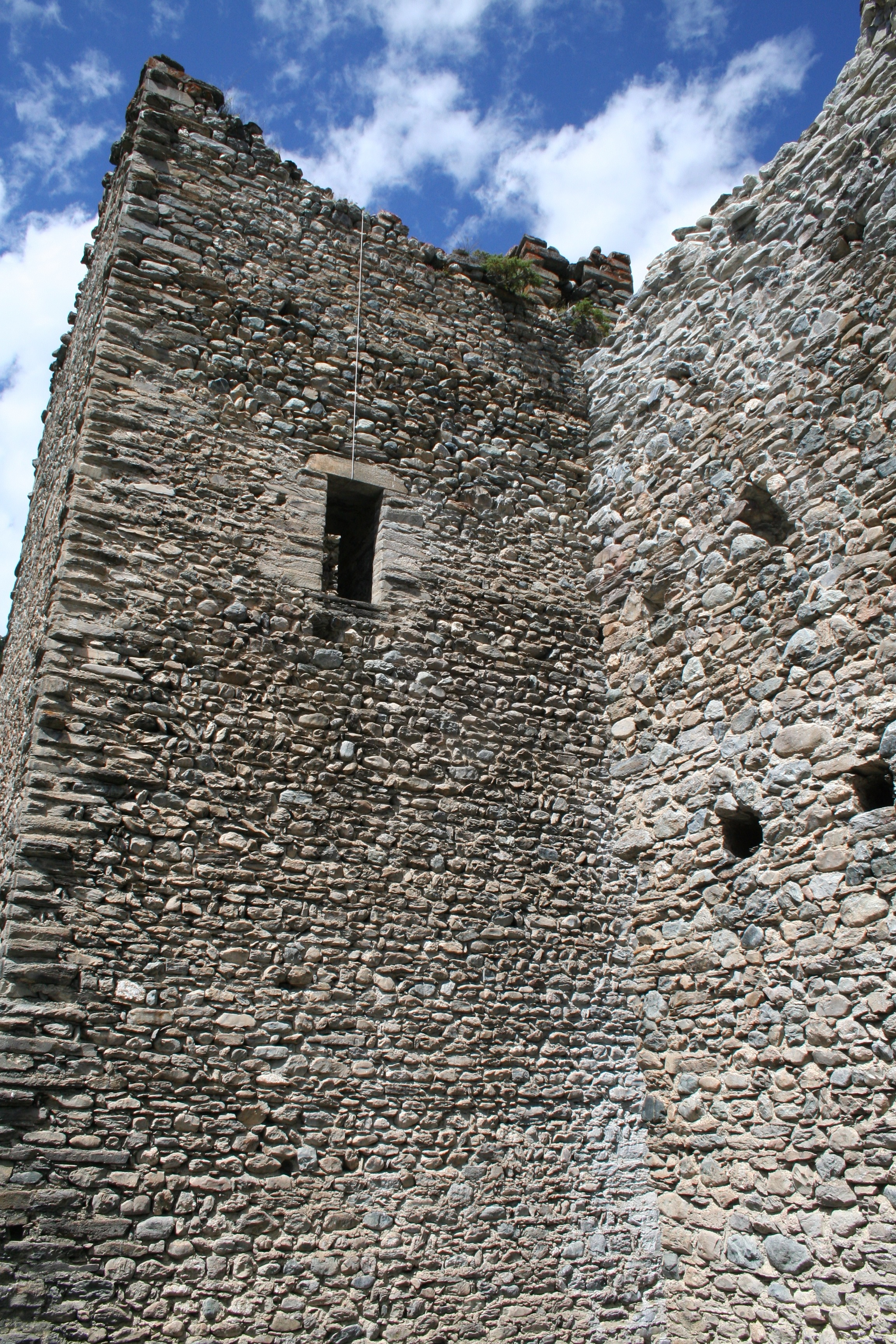
South side of the tower with high entrance

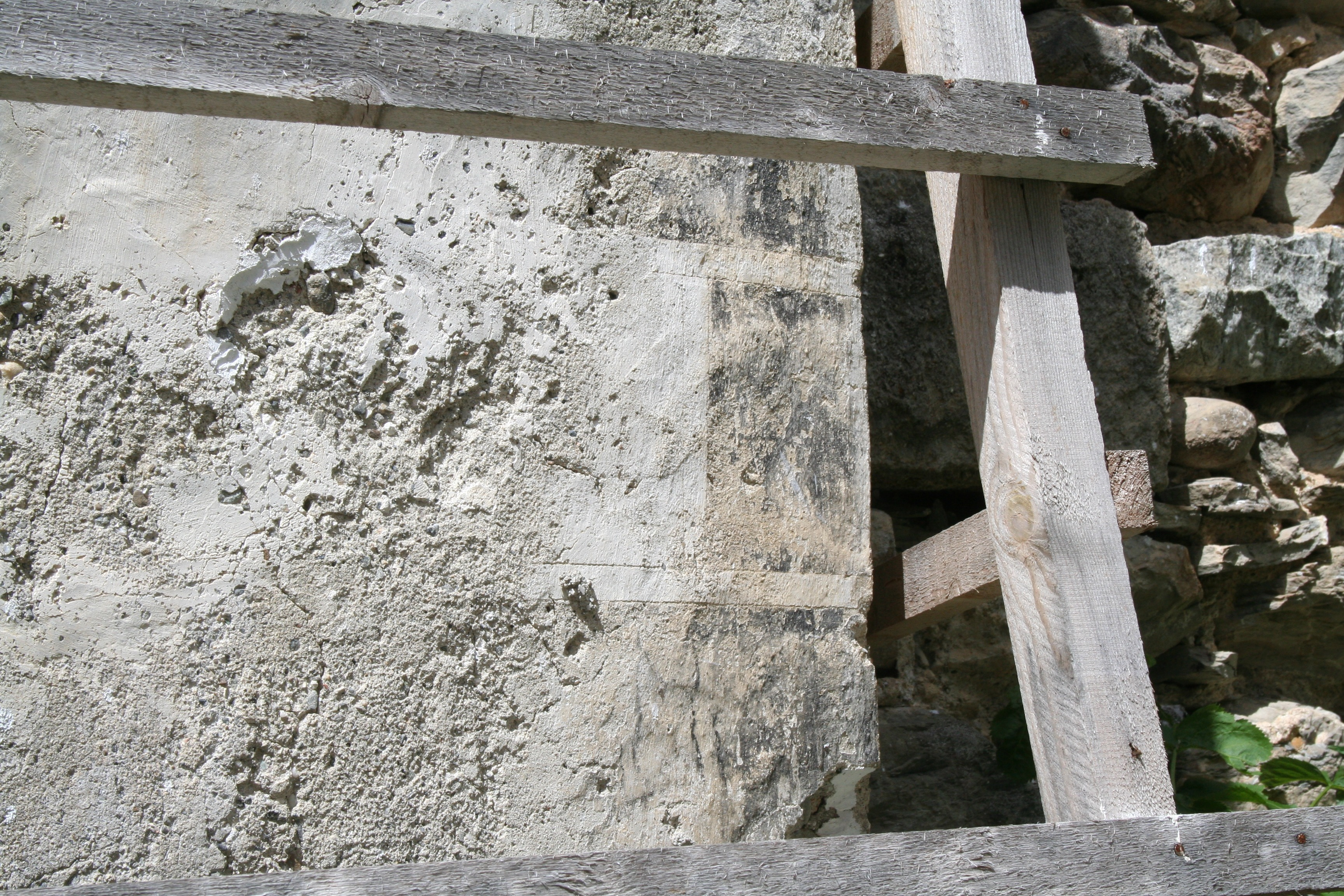
Sgraffito

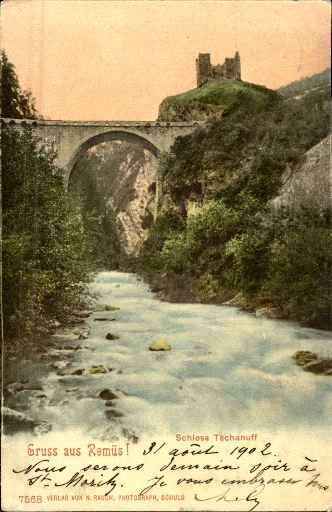
Post card from 1902

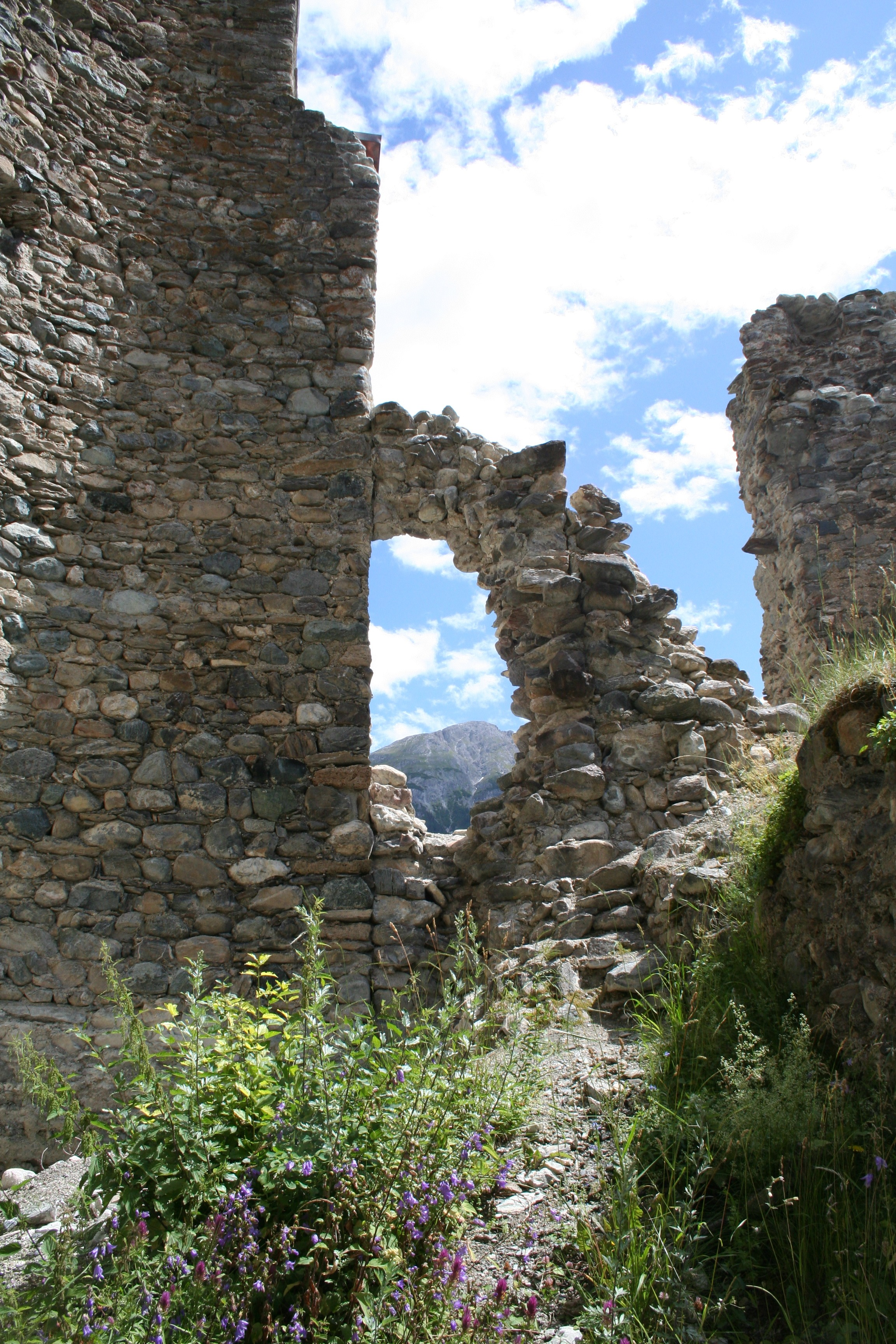
Ruins of the south wing

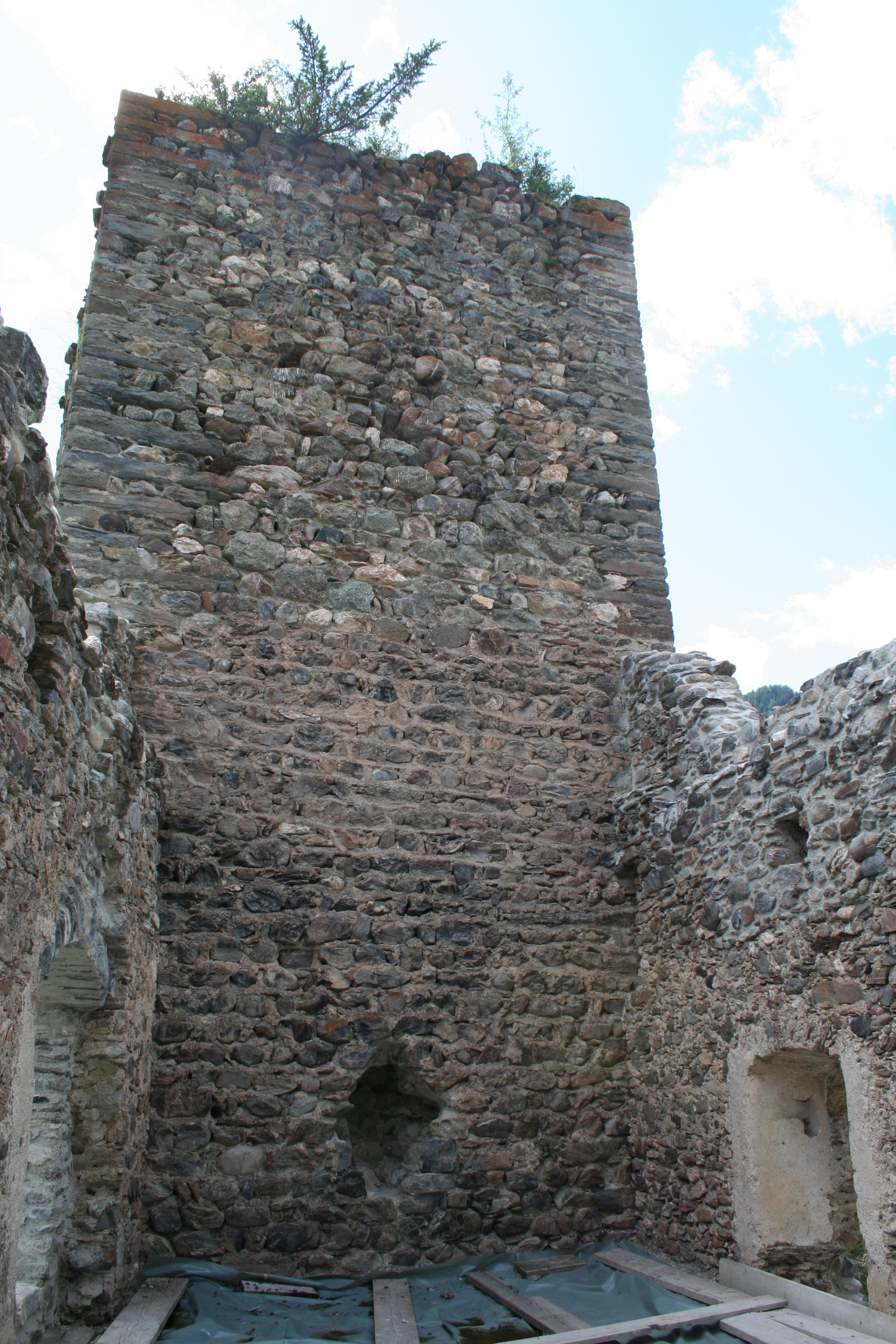
Inner side of the ring wall

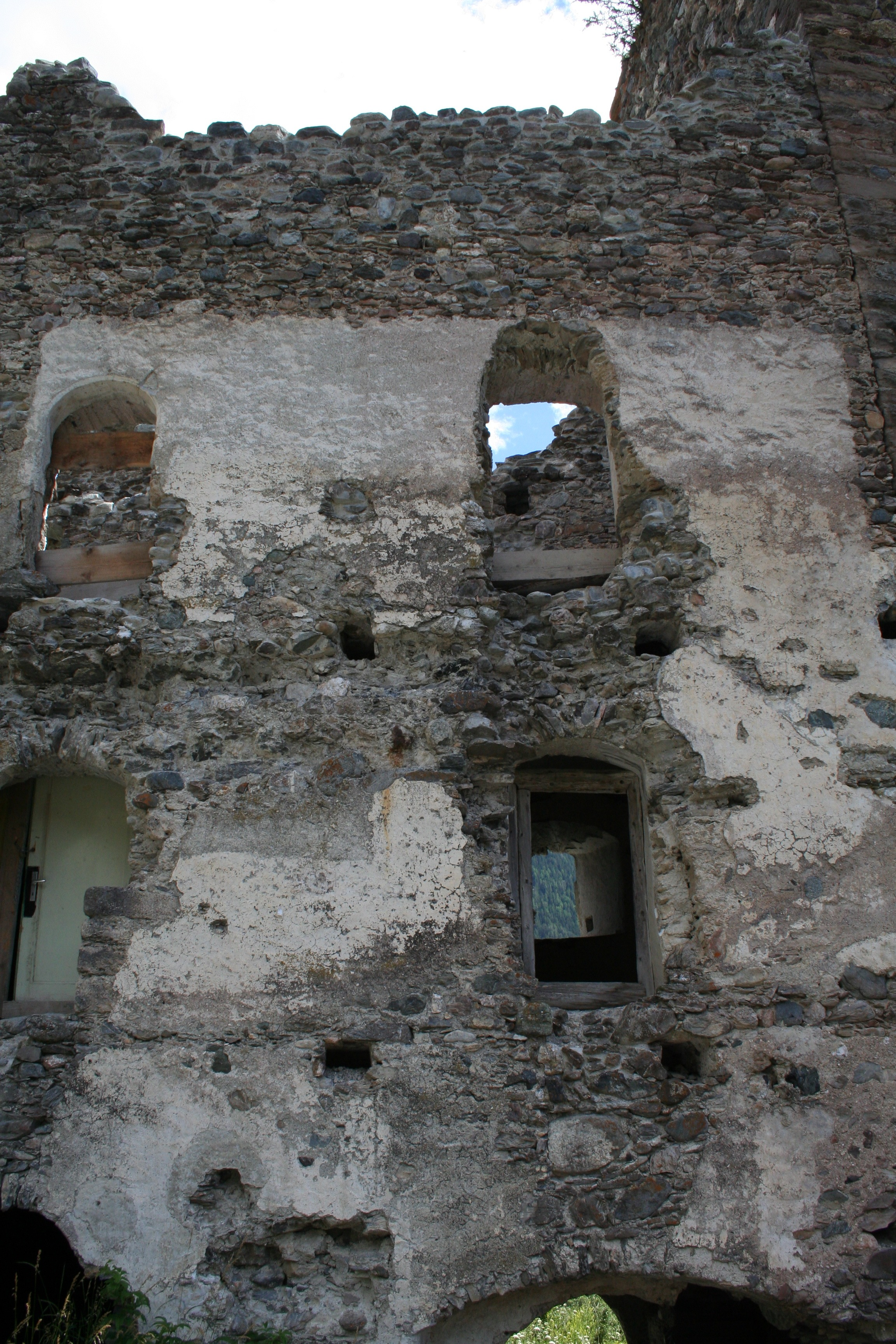
Residence wing

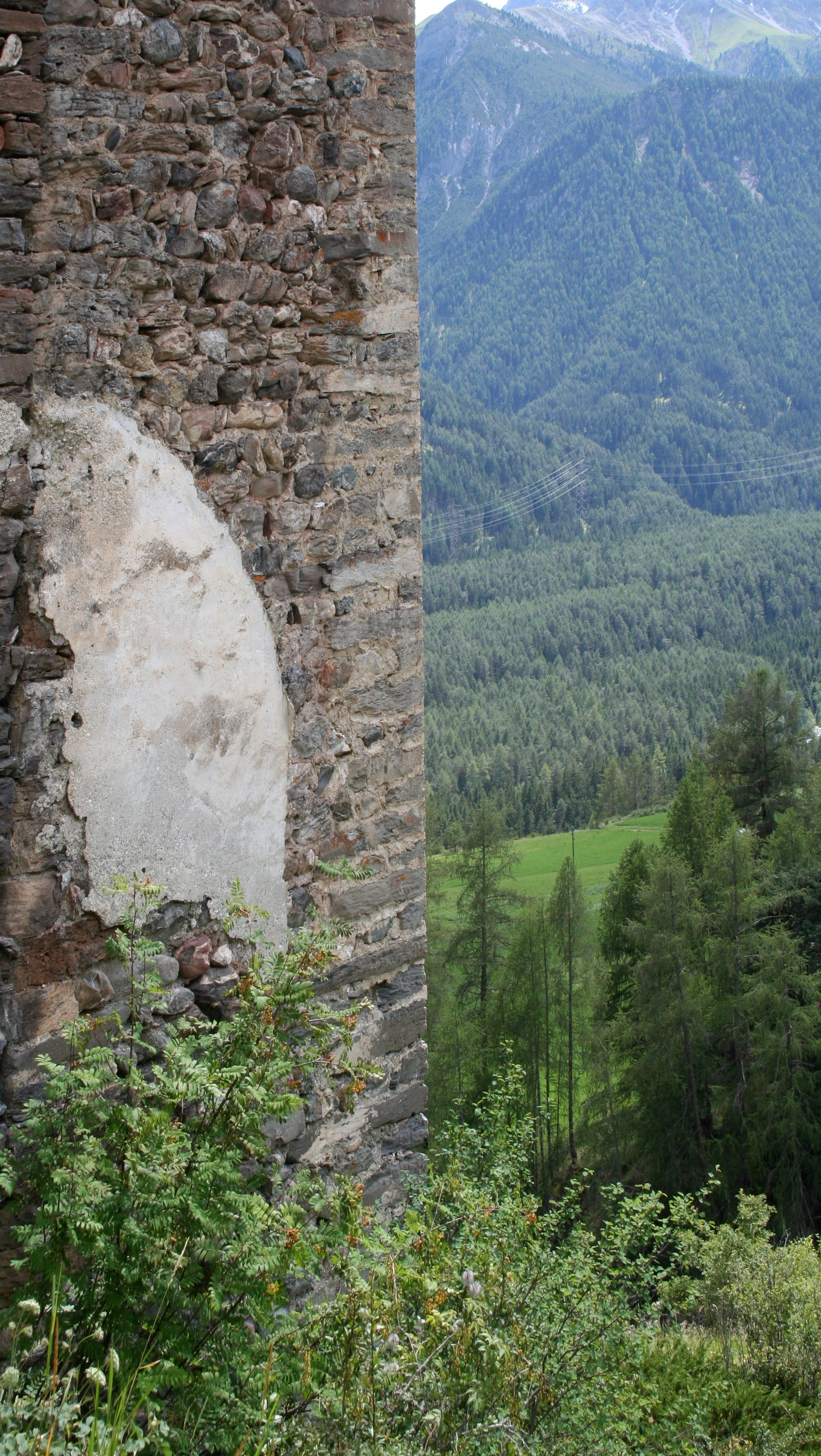
View of the south wall

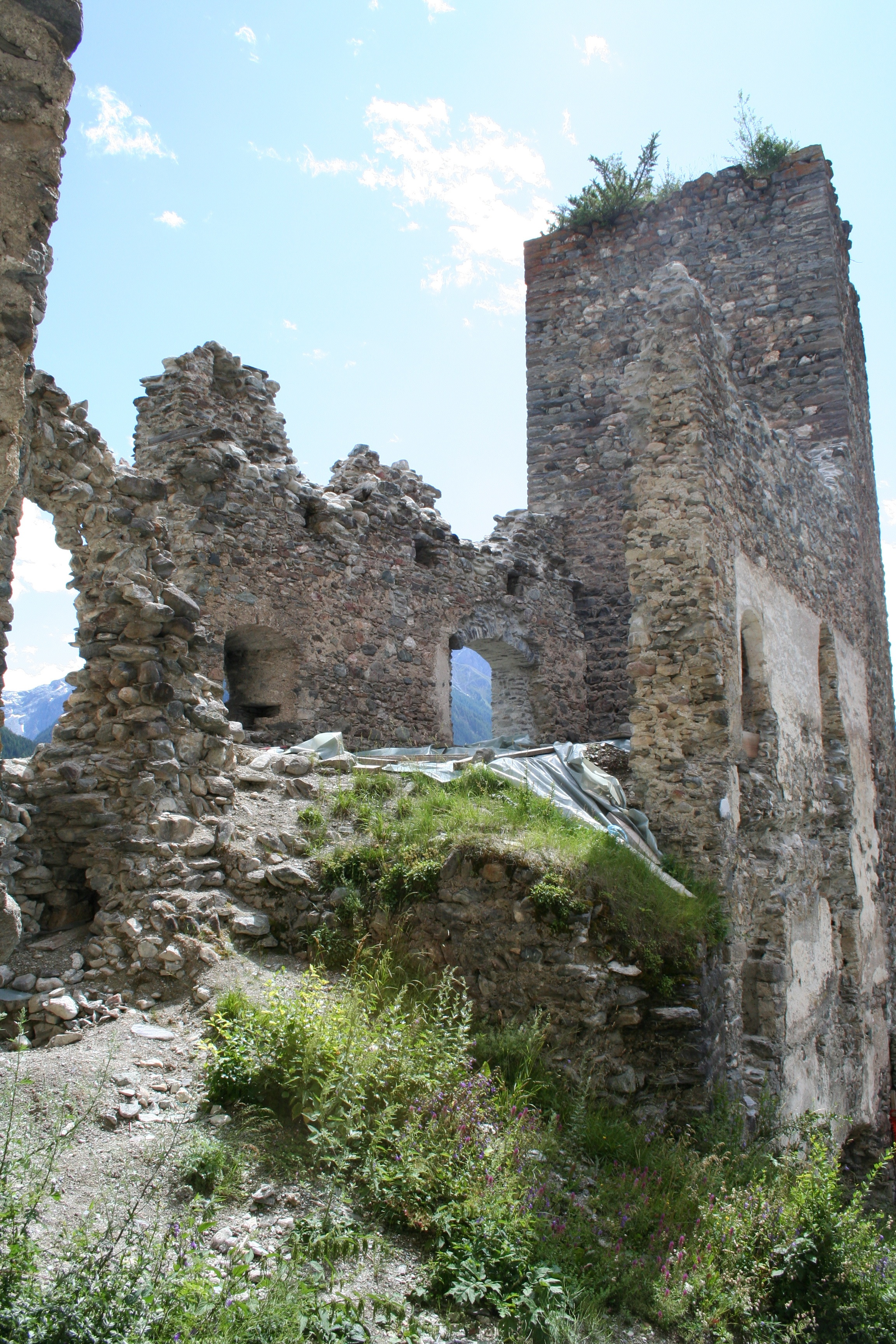
South wing

== See also ==
- List of castles in Switzerland
