= Serviezel Castle =

Swiss ruins

- Ruine Serviezel
- Valsot
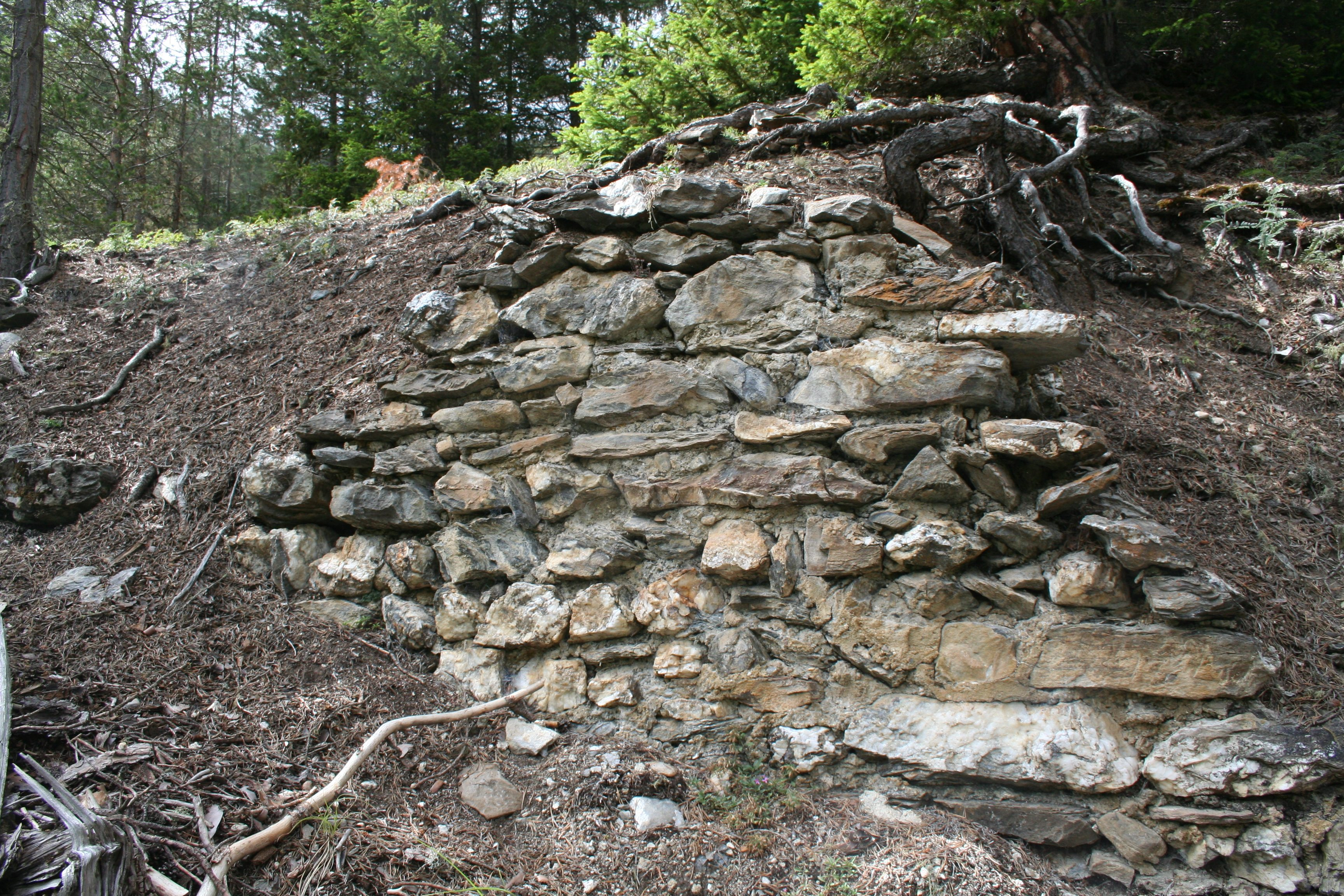
- South wall of the ruins

Site information
- Type: hill castle
- Code: CH-GR
- Condition: ruin

Location
- Coordinates: 46°52′59″N 10°27′10″E
- Height: 1,230 m above the sea

Site history
- Built: 12th century

Serviezel Castle is a pair of ruined castles in the municipality of Valsot of the Canton of Graubünden in Switzerland. Very little is known about either castle and they were probably both built in the 12th century for the Lords of Ramosch. Serviezel (Ramosch) is located in the former municipality of Ramosch, while Serviezel (Tschlin) is about 6.1 km (3.8 mi) away in the former municipality of Tschlin.

== History ==
Very little is known about either castle since neither is mentioned in any surviving medieval documents. Serviezel is probably named after the Wezzels, a local minor nobility family, who are first mentioned around 1150. They were probably vassals or a cadet line of the lords of Ramosch. In 1256 the Count of Tyrol granted Nannes of Ramosch permission to build a castle, but that probably refers to the larger and better known Tschanüff Castle.

== Castle site ==
=== Ramosch ===
The castle was a single rectangular tower probably with a full or partial ring wall on top of a small hill. The ruins are in poor condition and generally over grown. The tower is about 13 by 10 meters (43 ft × 33 ft) with wall thicknesses of between 1.8–2.4 m (5.9–7.9 ft). The south wall is about the most visible and is about 2.5 m (8.2 ft) high. West of the tower there is a pile of stone which probably marks the location of a collapsed wall or outbuilding.

=== Tschlin ===
This tower was built on a large (75 by 25 meters, 246 ft × 82 ft hilltop above a trade road through the valley. The walls are 1.2–1.4 m (3.9–4.6 ft) thick. The tower was probably encircled by a ring wall of which an 85 cm (2.79 ft) thick and 15 m (49 ft) long section is still visible.

== Gallery ==
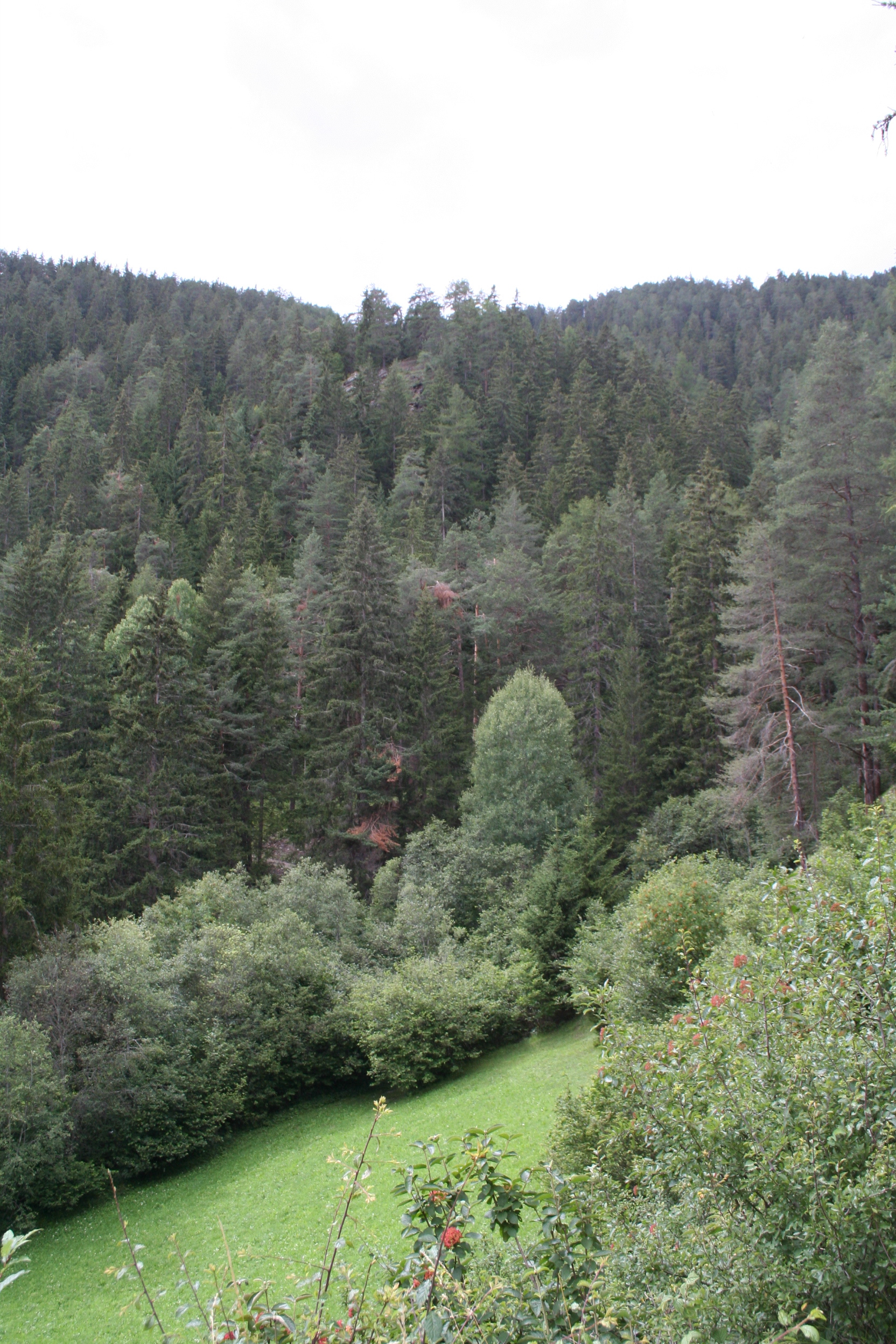
Castle hill

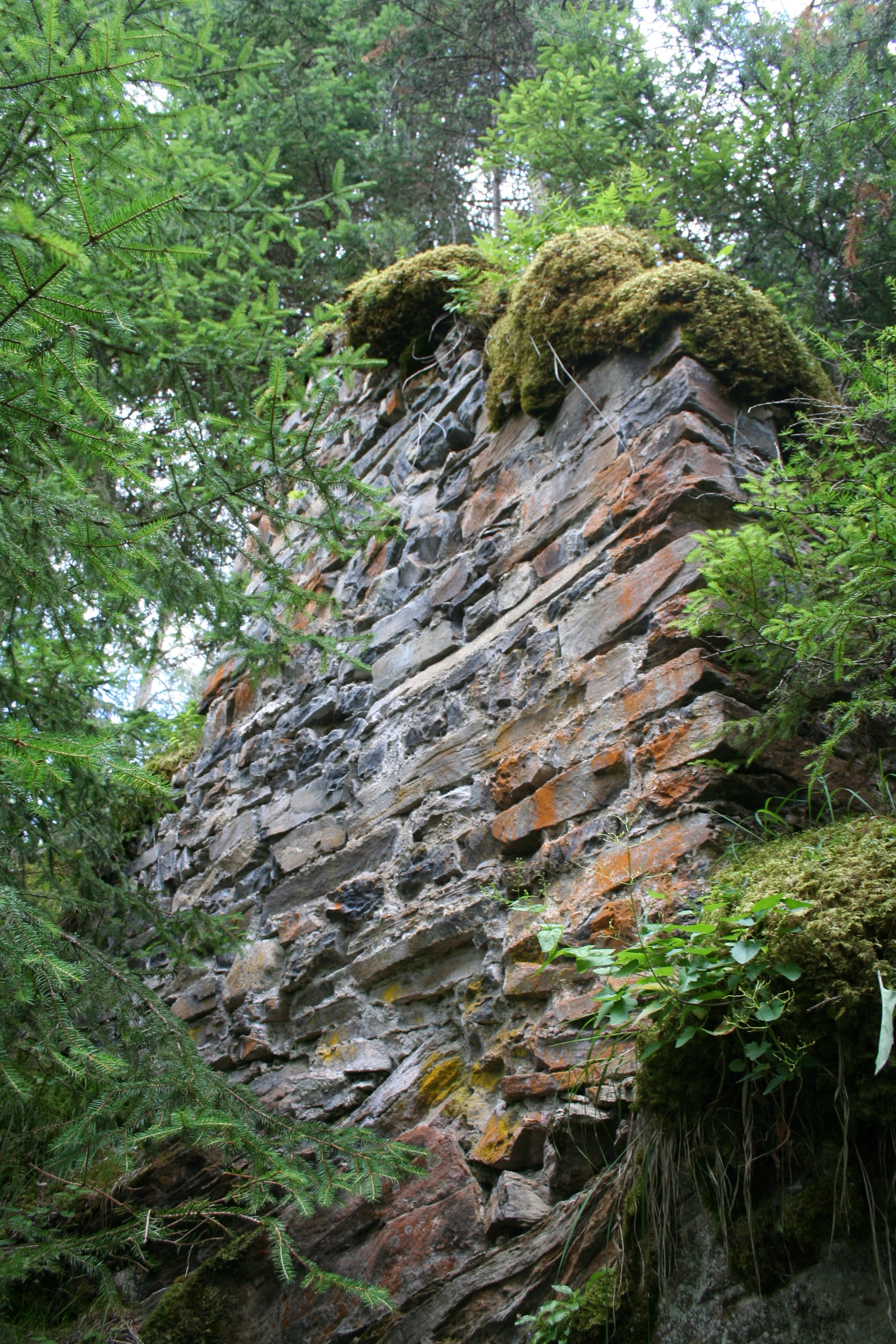
North wall

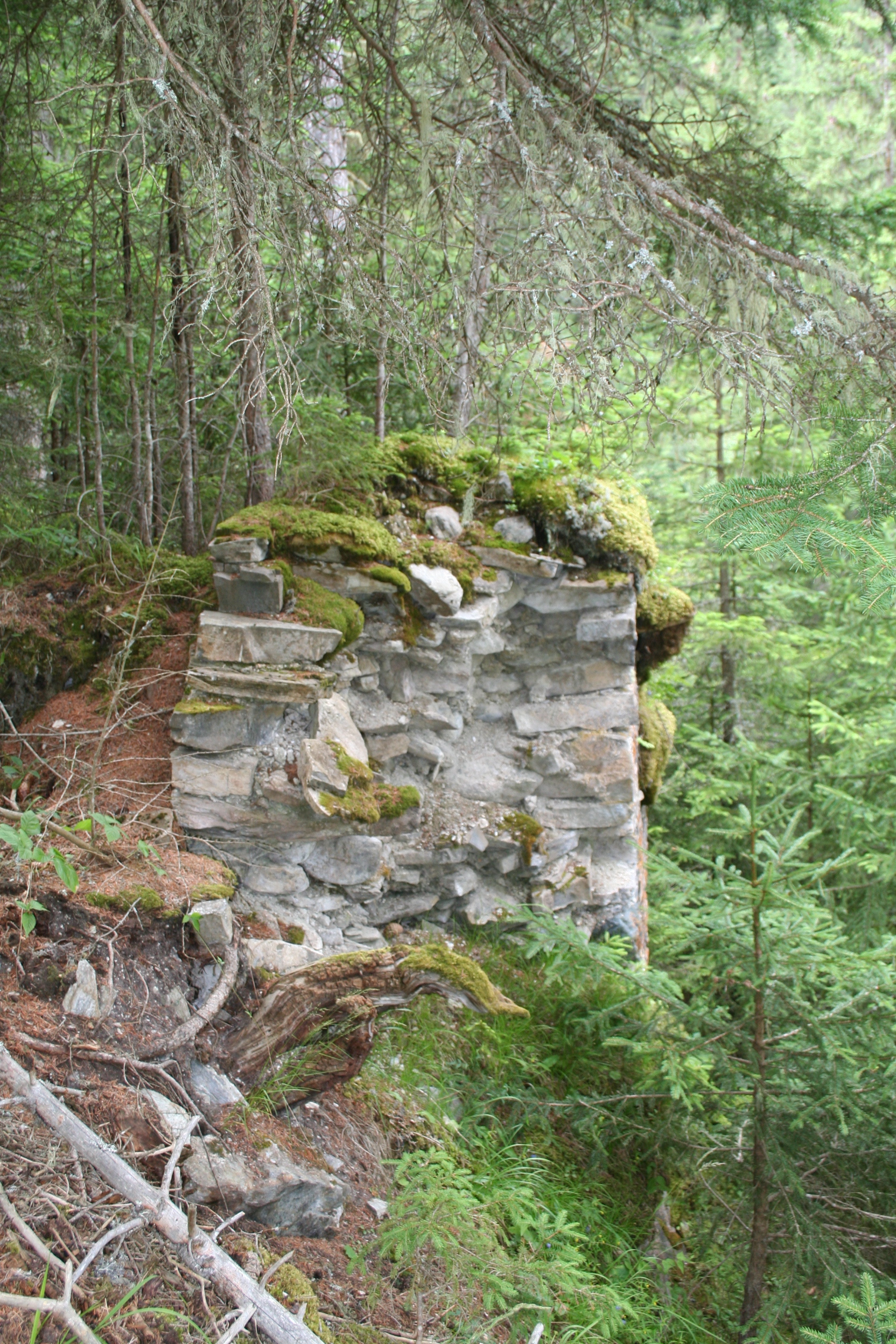
Cross section of the north wall

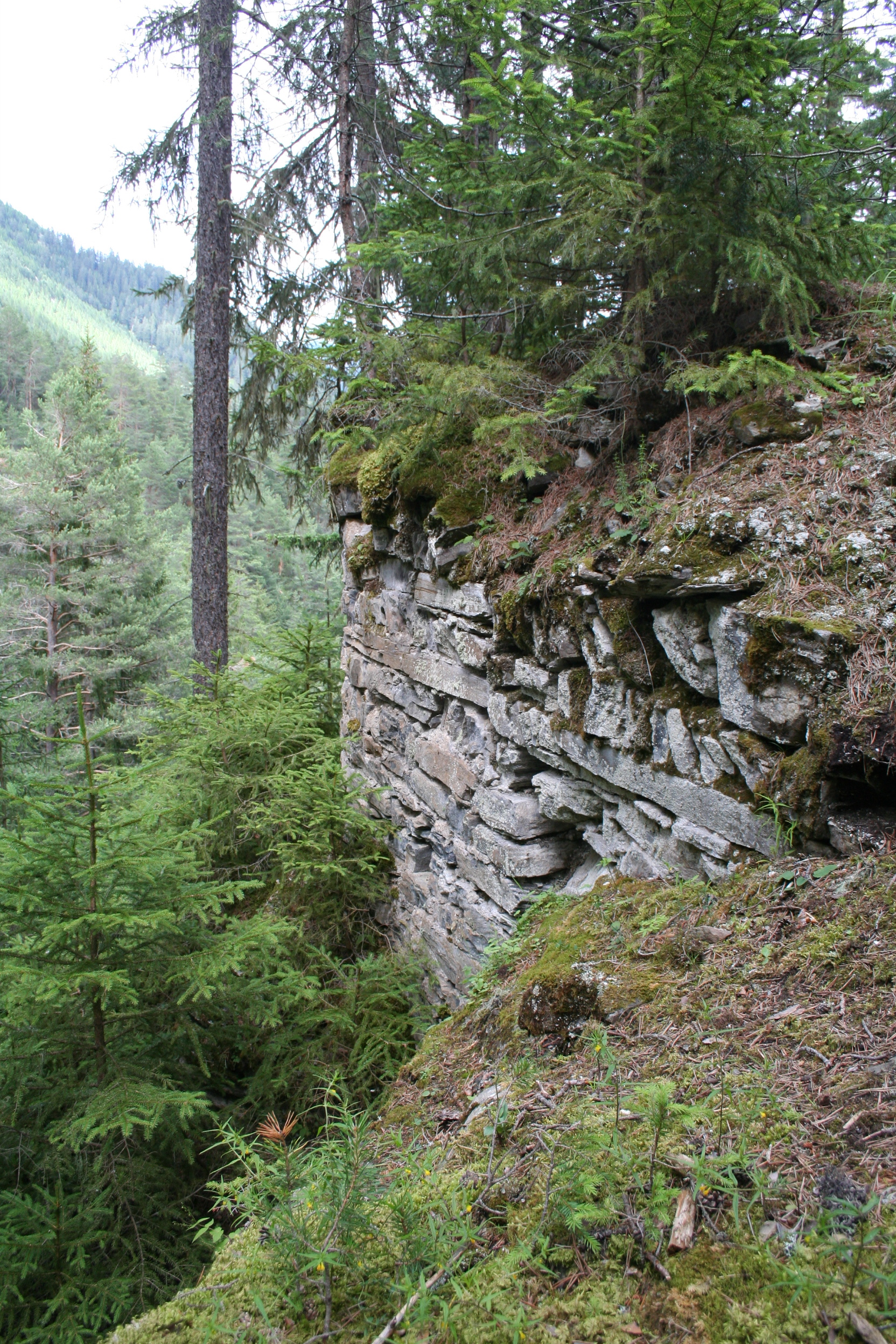
North corner of the tower

== See also ==
- List of castles in Switzerland
