= Fil Spadla =

Mountain in Switzerland

- Location within Switzerland

Highest point
- Elevation: 2,936 m (9,633 ft)
- Prominence: 210 m (690 ft)
- Parent peak: Fluchthorn
- Coordinates: 46°51′5.2″N 10°17′57.9″E

Geography
- Location: Graubünden, Switzerland
- Parent range: Silvretta Alps

The Fil Spadla (2,936 m) is a mountain of the Silvretta Alps, located north of Scuol in the canton of Graubünden, Switzerland. It has two secondary summits: the western summit (2,868 m) and the eastern summit (Piz Spadla, 2,912 m).
