= Western Rhaetian Alps =

Mountain range in the central part of the Alps

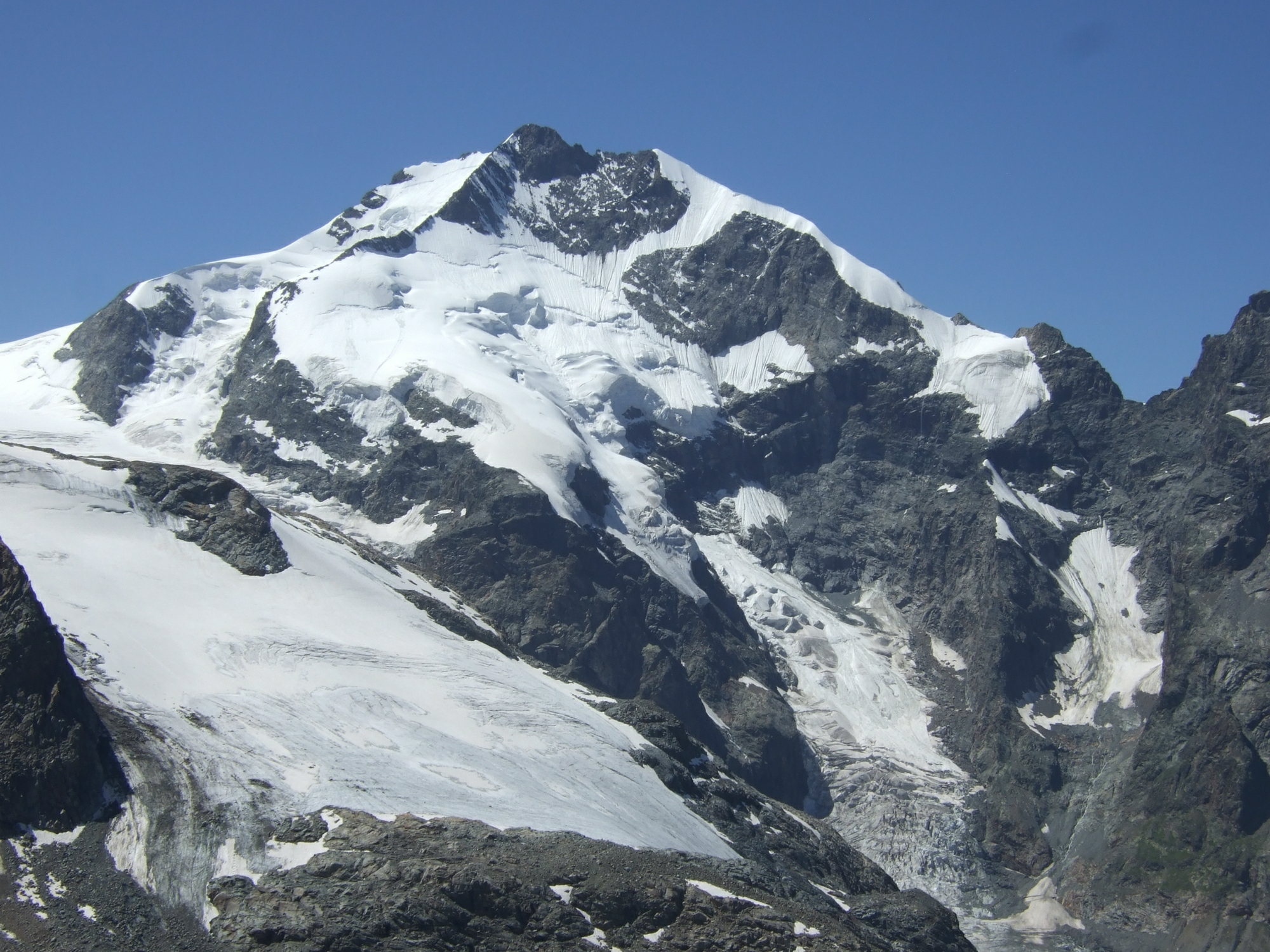
- Piz Bernina, the highest mountain of the range

Highest point
- Peak: Piz Bernina
- Elevation: 4,049 m (13,284 ft)
- Coordinates: 46°22′56″N 09°54′29″E

Naming
- Native name: Alpi Retiche occidentali (Italian); Westliche Rätische Alpen (German)

Geography
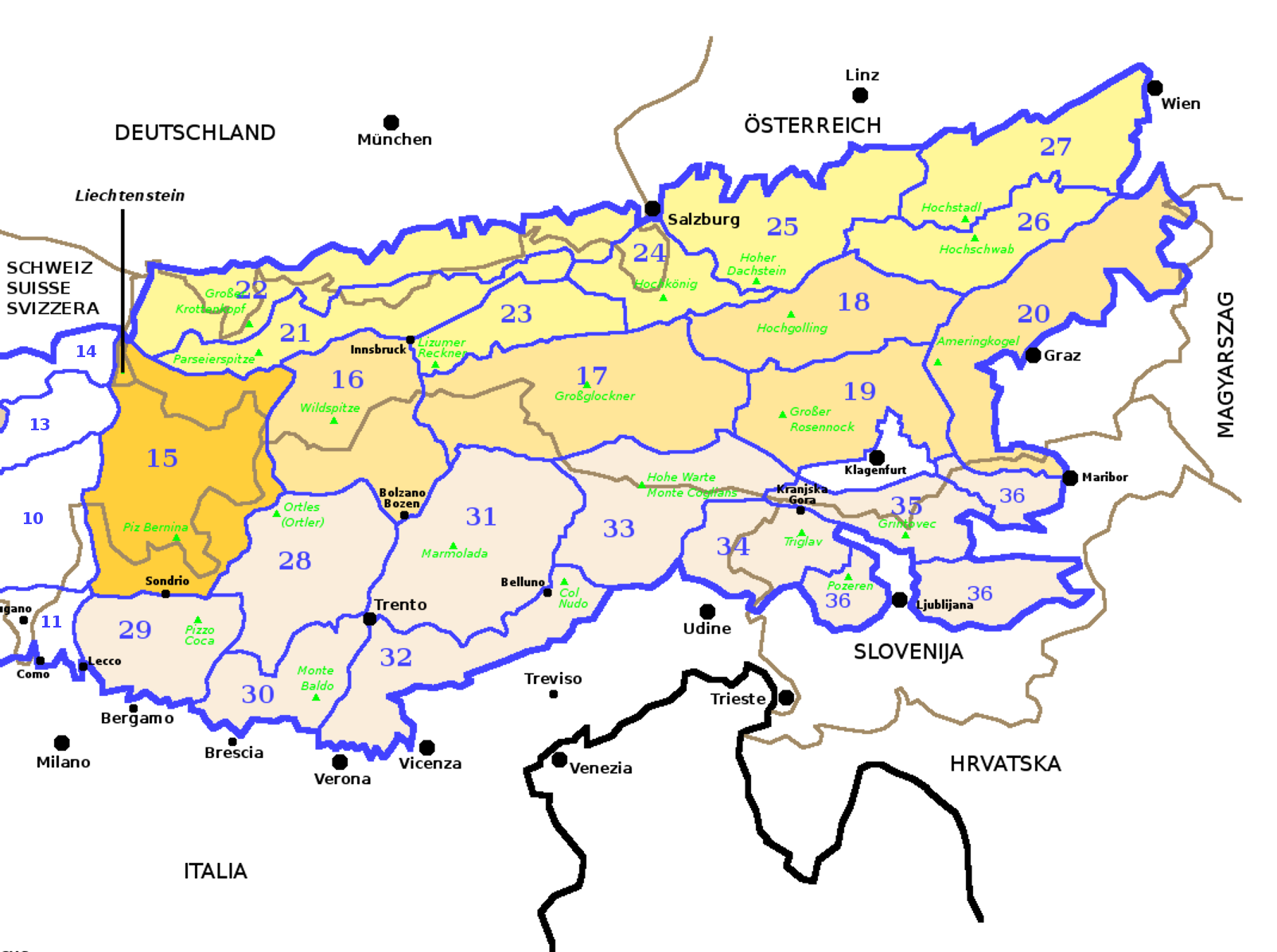
- Western Rhaetian Alps (section nr.15) within Eastern Alps
- Countries: Austria, Italy, Liechtenstein and Switzerland
- Region: Graubünden
- Parent range: Central Eastern Alps
- Borders on: Lugano Prealps, Lepontine Alps, Glarus Alps, Appenzell Alps, Bavarian Alps, North Tyrol Limestone Alps, Eastern Rhaetian Alps, Southern Rhaetian Alps and Bergamasque Alps and Prealps
- Topo map: Swiss Federal Office of Topography swisstopo

Geology
- Orogeny: Alpine orogeny

The Western Rhaetian Alps (Italian: Alpi Retiche occidentali, German: Westliche Rätische Alpen) are a mountain range in the central part of the Alps.

== Geography ==
Administratively the range mainly belongs to the Italian region of Lombardy, the Swiss canton of Graubünden and the Austrian states of Vorarlberg and Tyrol. Also the independent state of Liechtenstein is totally included in the Western Rhaetian Alps.

=== SOIUSA classification ===
According to SOIUSA (International Standardized Mountain Subdivision of the Alps) the mountain range is an Alpine section, classified in the following way:

- main part = Eastern Alps
- major sector = Central Eastern Alps
- section = Western Rhaetian Alps
- code = II/A-15

=== Subdivision ===
The range is subdivided into seven subsections:

- Oberhalbstein Range (DE: Oberhalbsteiner Alpen, IT: Alpi del Platta) - SOIUSA code: II/A-15.I,
- Albula Alps (DE: Albula-Alpen, IT: Alpi dell'Albula) - SOIUSA code: II/A-15.II,
- Bernina Range (DE: Berninagruppe, IT: Alpi del Bernina) - SOIUSA code: II/A-15.III,
- Livigno Range (DE: Livigno-Alperne, IT: Alpi di Livigno) - SOIUSA code: II/A-15.IV,
- Sesvenna Range (DE: Sesvennagruppe, IT: Alpi della Val Müstair) - SOIUSA code: II/A-15.V,
- Silvretta, Samnaun and Ferwall Alps (DE: Silvretta, Samnaun und Ferwall Alpen, IT: Alpi del Silvretta, del Samnaun e del Verwall) - SOIUSA code: II/A-15.VI,
- Plessur Range (DE: Plessur-Alpen, IT: Alpi del Plessur) - SOIUSA code: II/A-15.VII,
- Rätikon (DE: Rätikon, IT: Catena del Rätikon) - SOIUSA code: II/A-15.- SOIUSA code: II/A-15.VIII.

=== AVE Classification ===
The Alpine Club classification of the Eastern Alps categorizes most of the SOIUSA Western Rhaetian Alps groups within the Western Limestone Alps.

== Notable summits ==
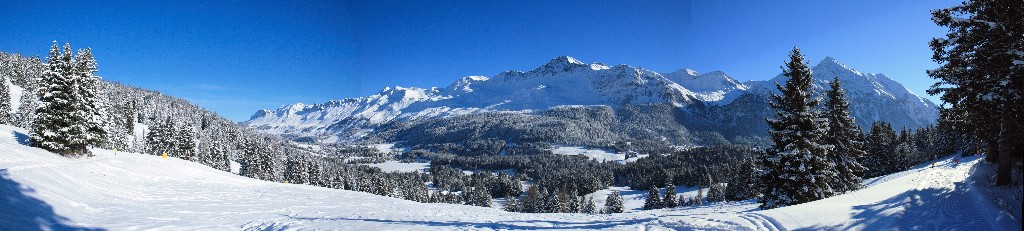
Plessur Range panorama

Some notable summits of the Western Rhaetian Alps are:

Name	elevation (m)	Alpine subsection
Piz Bernina	4.049	Bernina Range
Pizzo Zupò	3.996	Bernina Range
Piz Scerscen	3.971	Bernina Range
Piz Argient	3.945	Bernina Range
Piz Roseg	3.937	Bernina Range
Pizzo Bellavista	3.922	Bernina Range
Piz Palü	3.901	Bernina Range
Piz Morteratsch	3.751	Bernina Range
Monte Disgrazia	3.688	Bernina Range
Piz Corvatsch	3.451	Bernina Range
Cima Piazzi	3.440	Livigno Range
Piz Kesch	3.418	Albula Alps
Piz Linard	3.411	Silvretta, Samnaun and Ferwall Alps
Piz Calderas	3.397	Albula Alps
Piz Platta	3.392	Alpi del Platta
Cima di Castello	3.388	Bernina Range
Piz Julier	3.380	Albula Alps
Piz d'Err	3.378	Albula Alps
Pizzo Cengalo	3.367	Bernina Range
Pizzo Scalino	3.323	Bernina Range
Piz Buin	3.312	Silvretta, Samnaun and Ferwall Alps
Pizzo Badile	3.308	Bernina Range
Pizzo Paradisino	3.305	Livigno Range
Muttler	3.294	Silvretta, Samnaun and Ferwall Alps
Piz Forbesch	3.262	Oberhalbstein Range
Piz Languard	3.262	Livigno Range
Piz Ot	3.246	Albula Alps
Silvrettahorn	3.244	Silvretta, Samnaun and Ferwall Alps
Piz Timun	3.209	Oberhalbstein Range
Piz Sesvenna	3.204	Sesvenna Range
Piz Quattervals	3.165	Livigno Range
Pizzo Stella	3.163	Oberhalbstein Range
Piz Duan	3.131	Oberhalbstein Range
Pizzo Galleggione	3.107	Oberhalbstein Range
Piz Lischana	3.105	Sesvenna Range
Piz Umbrail	3.033	Sesvenna Range
Aroser Rothorn	2.980	Plessur Range
Schesaplana	2.964	Rätikon
Lenzerhorn	2.906	Plessur Range
Grauspitz	2.599	Rätikon

== Notable passes ==
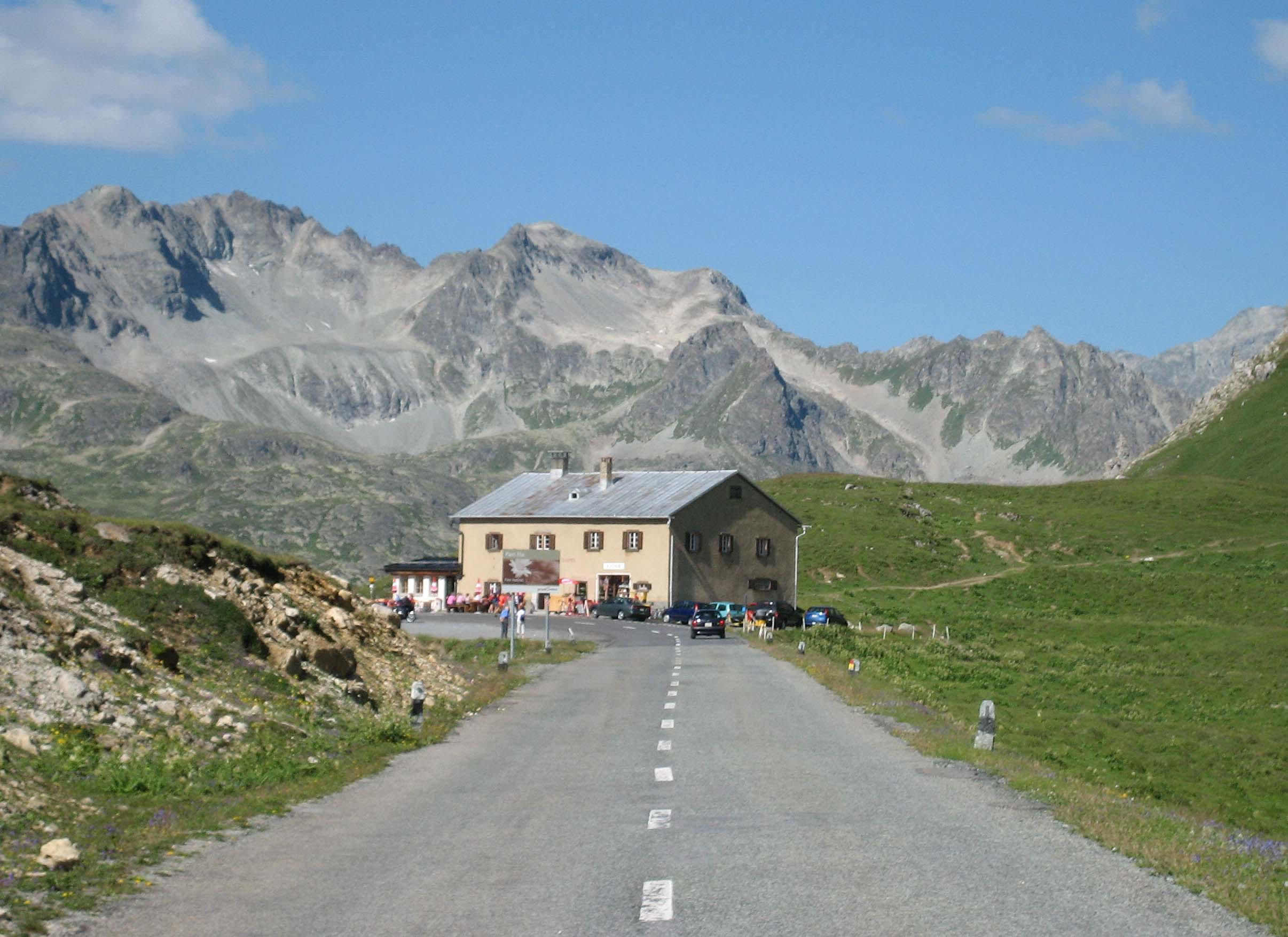
Albula Pass hospice

Some notable passes of the Western Rhaetian Alps are:

- Albula Pass
- Bernina Pass
- Flüela Pass
- Foscagno Pass
- Maloja Pass
- Reschen Pass
- Splügen Pass
- Stelvio Pass
- Umbrail Pass
- Wolfgang Pass

== Bibliography ==
- Brasca; Silvestri; Balabio e Corti (1911). Alpi Retiche Occidentali (Collana Guida dei Monti d'Italia) (in Italian). Club Alpino Italiano and Touring Club Italiano.

== Maps ==
- Italian official cartography (Istituto Geografico Militare - IGM); on-line version: www.pcn.minambiente.it
- Swiss official cartography (Swiss Federal Office of Topography - Swisstopo); on-line version: map.geo.admin.ch
