= Piz Scalotta =

Mountain in Switzerland

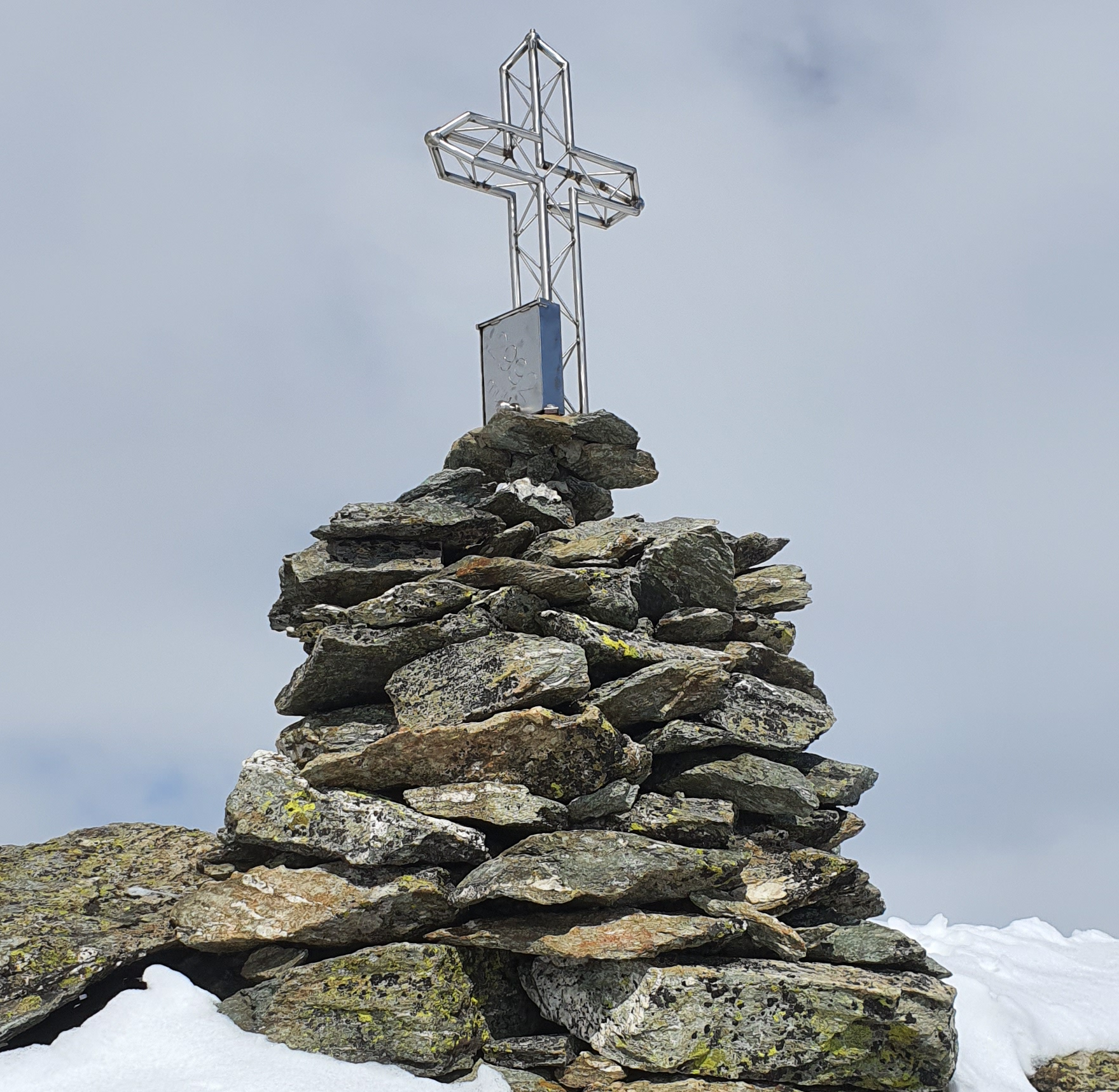
- Cairn on Piz Scalotta

Highest point
- Elevation: 2,992 m (9,816 ft)
- Prominence: 60 m (200 ft)
- Parent peak: Piz Surparé
- Coordinates: 46°28′20.6″N 9°35′41.9″E

Geography
- Location within Switzerland
- Location: Graubünden, Switzerland
- Parent range: Oberhalbstein Alps

Piz Scalotta is a mountain of the Oberhalbstein Alps, located west of Bivio in the canton of Graubünden. It lies north of Piz Surparé. A commonly described route starts at Bivio and follows the path toward Stallerberg before crossing into Val Gronda and continuing to the summit; the descent can continue through Val Gronda to Stalveder.
