= Piz Curvér =

Mountain in Swiss canton of Graubünden

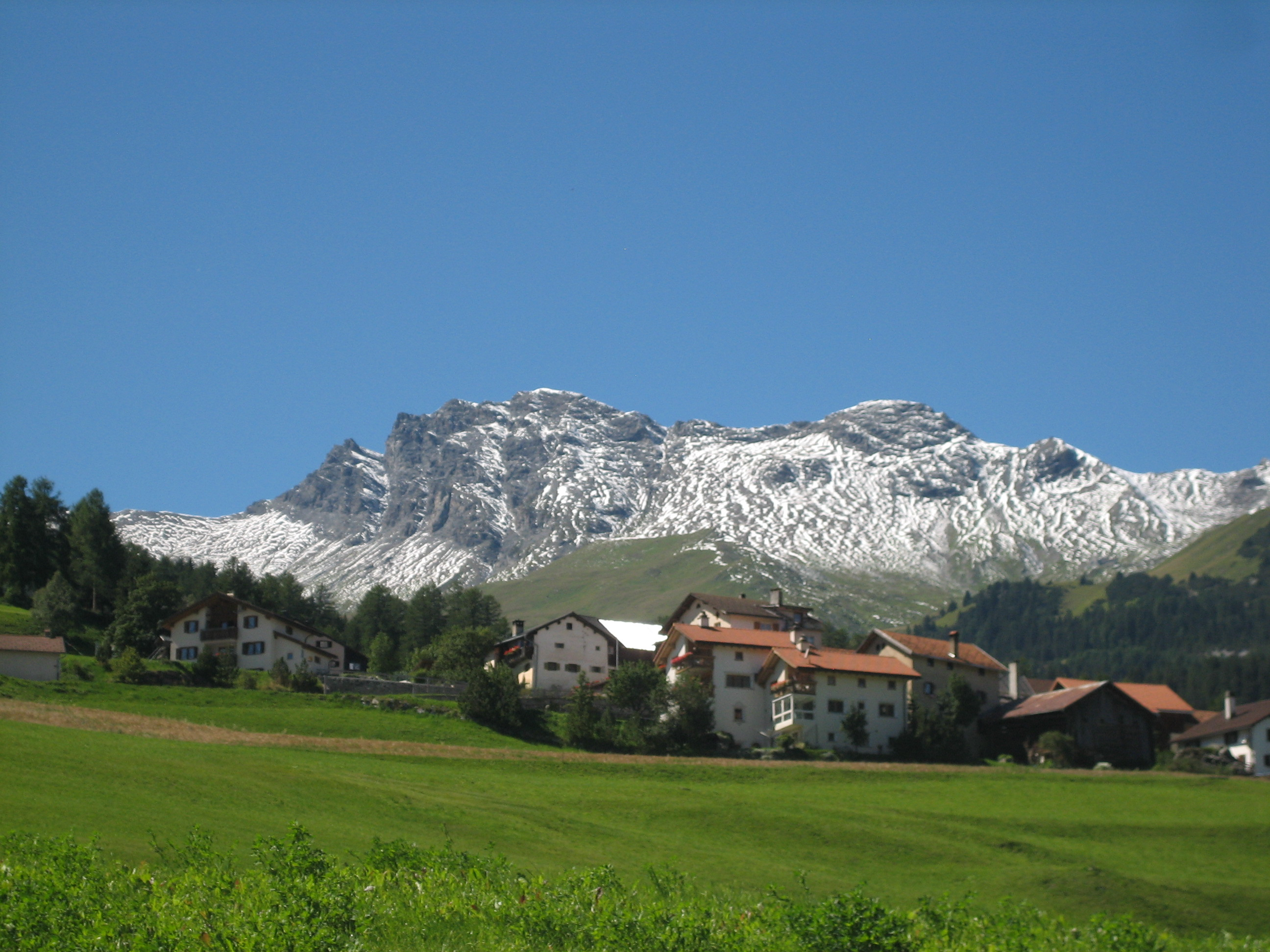
- View from Riom-Parsonz

Highest point
- Elevation: 2,972 m (9,751 ft)
- Prominence: 456 m (1,496 ft)
- Parent peak: Piz Grisch
- Coordinates: 46°36′12.6″N 9°29′49.4″E

Geography
- Location within Switzerland
- Location: Graubünden, Switzerland
- Parent range: Oberhalbstein Range

Piz Curvér is a mountain of the Oberhalbstein Range, between Andeer and Savognin, in the canton of Graubünden. With a height of 2,972 metres (9,751 ft) above sea level, it is the highest point of the chain north of the pass Fuorcla Cotschna. On its eastern flank lies the holy pilgrimage site of Ziteil, at 2,434 metres (7,986 ft) above sea level.

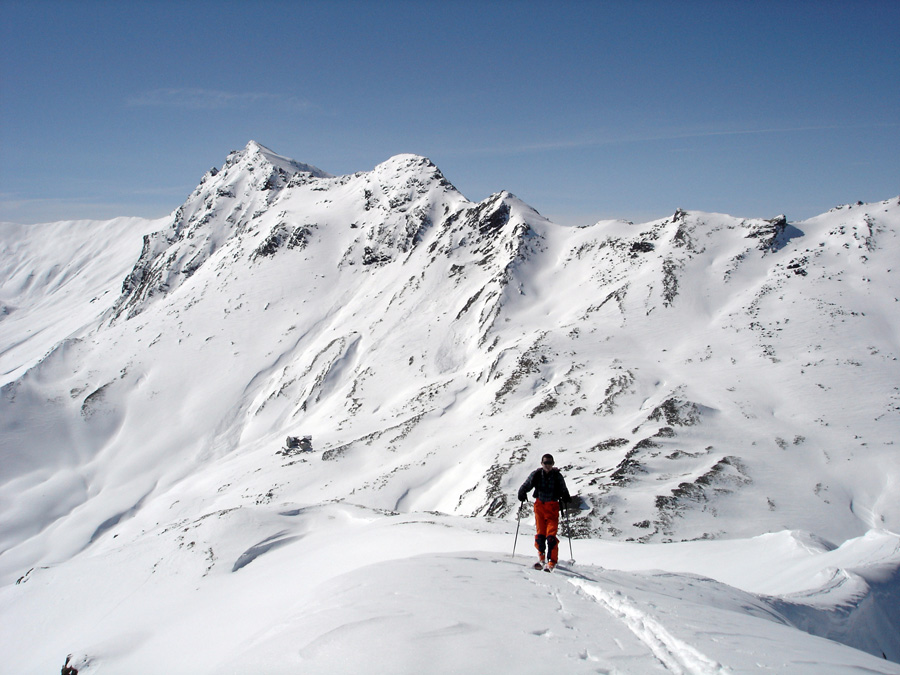
View of Piz Curvér from Piz Toissa
