= Piz Arblatsch =

Mountain in Switzerland

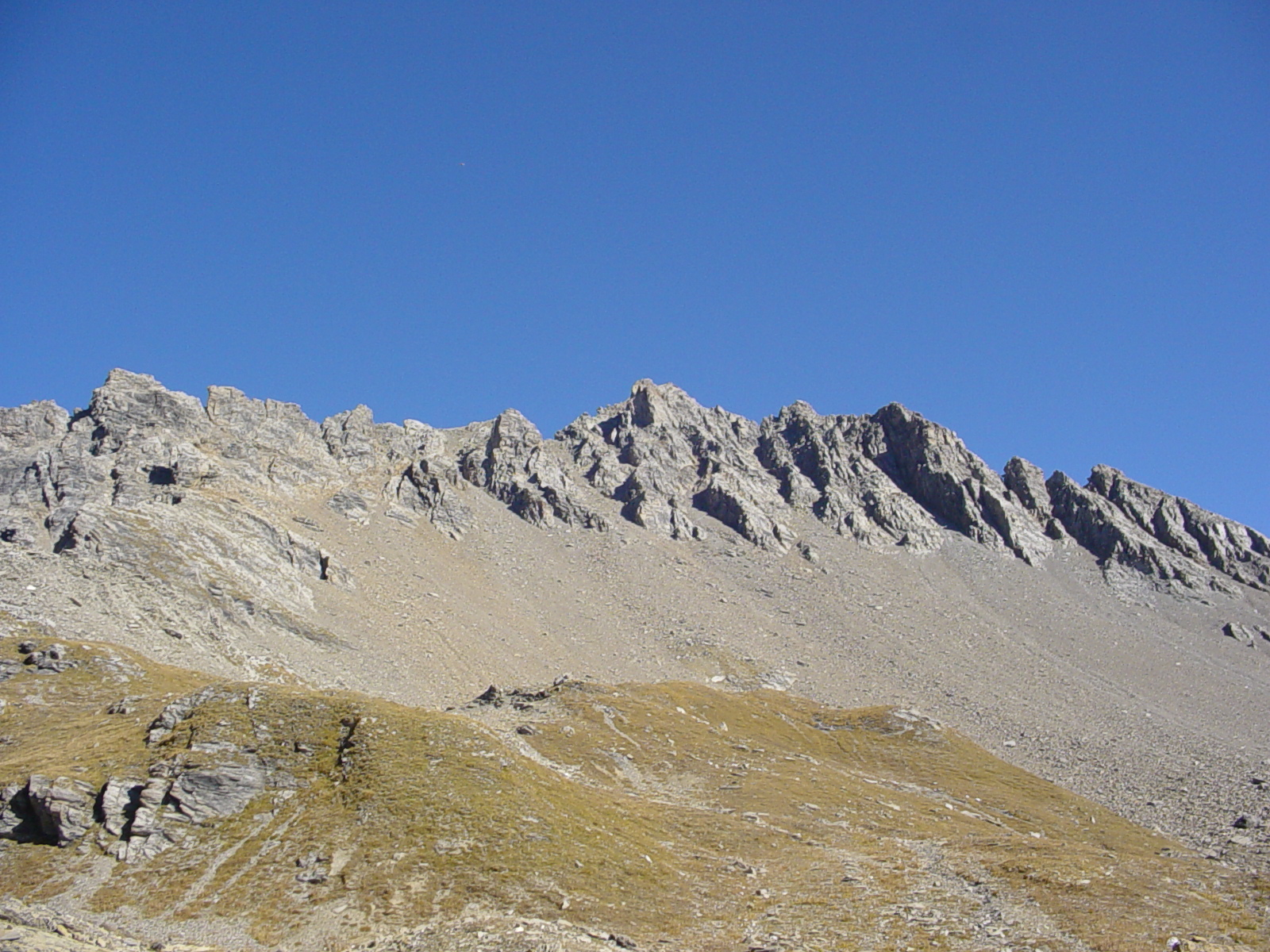
- View from the south

Highest point
- Elevation: 3,203 m (10,509 ft)
- Prominence: 235 m (771 ft)
- Parent peak: Piz Forbesch
- Coordinates: 46°32′07.8″N 09°34′37.2″E

Geography
- Location within Switzerland
- Location: Graubünden, Switzerland
- Parent range: Oberhalbstein Alps

Piz Arblatsch is a mountain of the Oberhalbstein Alps, overlooking Mulegns in the canton of Graubünden.

== Gallery ==
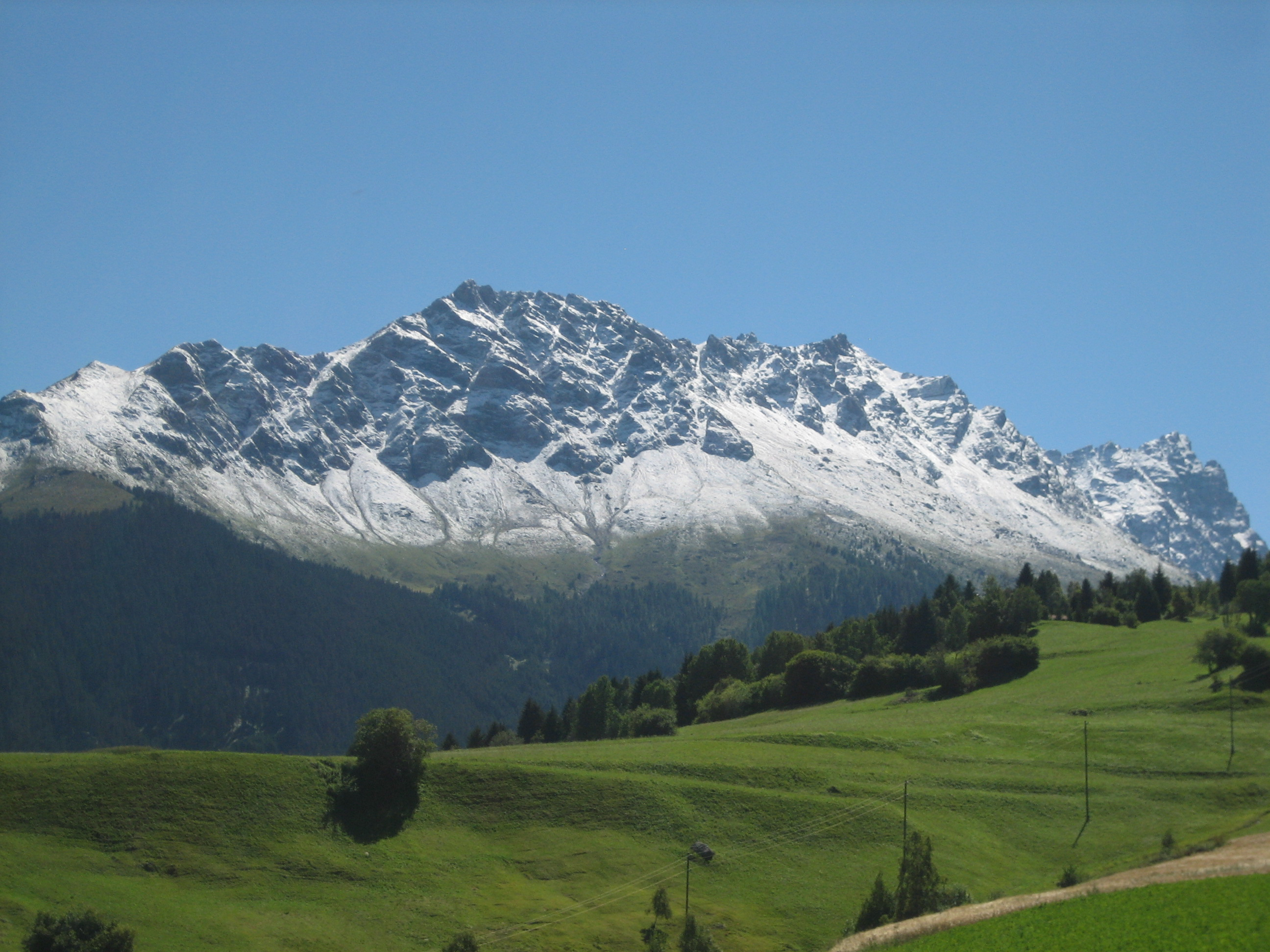
Piz Arlos, Piz Arblatsch and Piz Forbesch

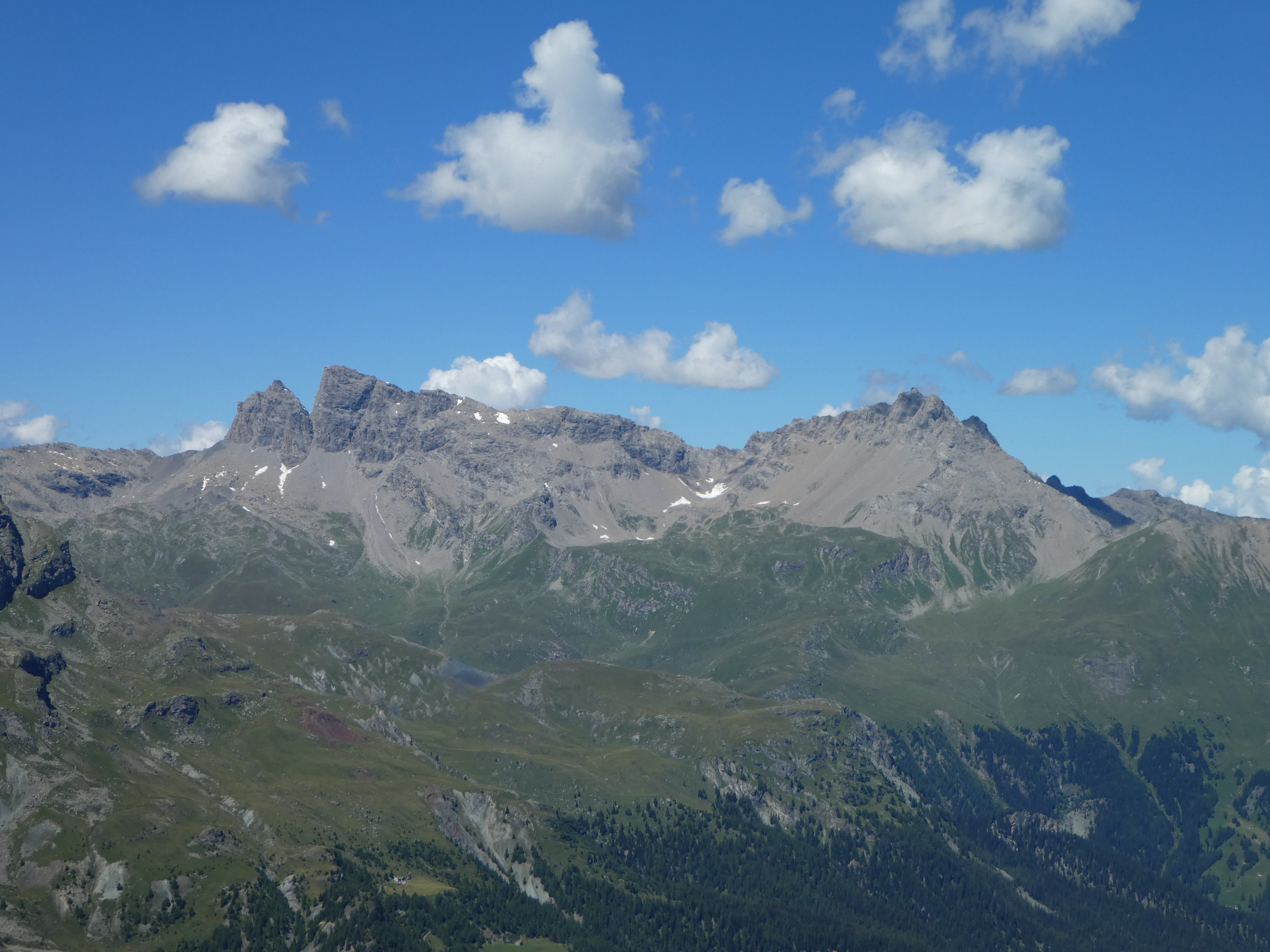
Piz Forbesch and Piz Arblatsch as seen from Piz Barscheinz

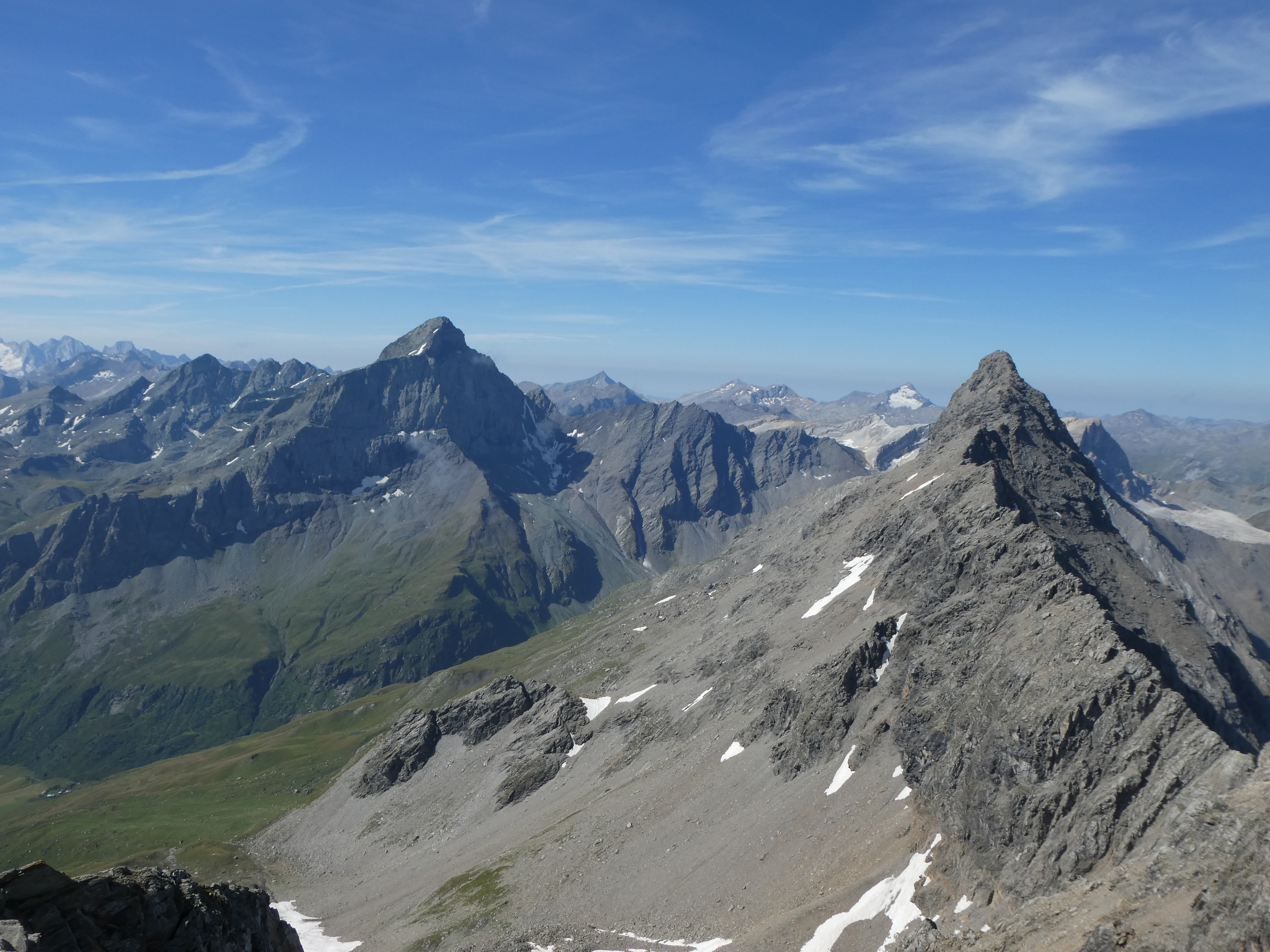
Piz Platta and Piz Forbesch as seen from Piz Arblatsch
