= Piz Alv (Oberhalbstein Alps) =

Mountain in Switzerland

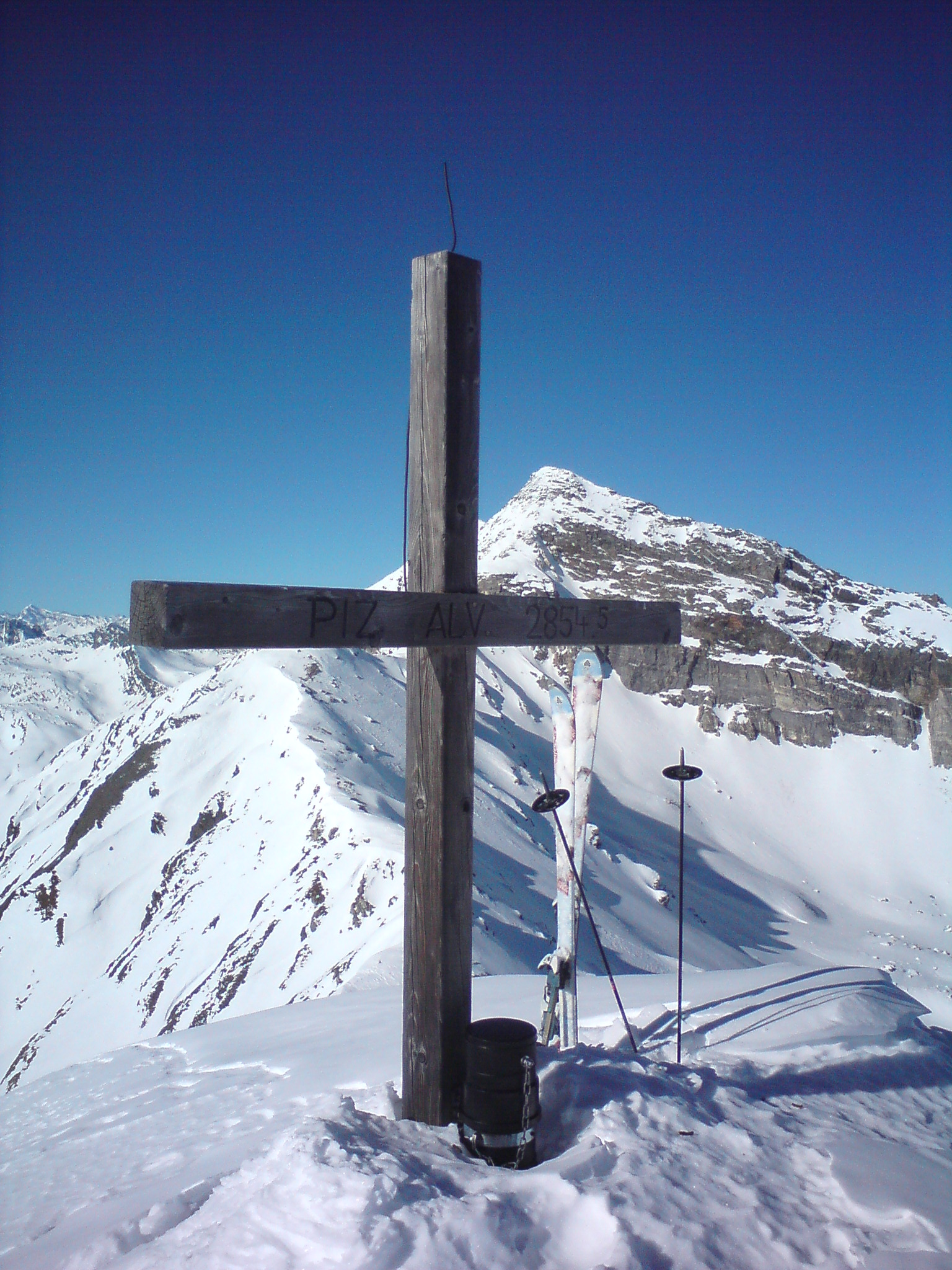
- The summit

Highest point
- Elevation: 2,855 m (9,367 ft)
- Prominence: 128 m (420 ft)
- Parent peak: Piz Grisch
- Coordinates: 46°31′34″N 9°29′34″E

Geography
- Location within Switzerland
- Location: Graubünden, Switzerland
- Parent range: Oberhalbstein Alps

Climbing
- Easiest route: From Radons

Piz Alv (2,854.5 m) is a mountain of the Oberhalbstein Alps, located east of Innerferrera in the canton of Graubünden. It lies on the chain between the Val Ferrera and the Val Nandro.
