= Miez =

Miez may refer to:

- Georges Miez (1904–1999), Swiss gymnast
- Miez, former name of Mies, Switzerland
- Piz Miez, mountain of the Oberhalbstein Alps, located on the border between Italy and Switzerland
