= Tscheischhorn =

Mountain in Switzerland

- Location within Switzerland

Highest point
- Elevation: 3,019 m (9,905 ft)
- Prominence: 246 m (807 ft)
- Parent peak: Gletscherhorn
- Coordinates: 46°25′39.7″N 9°31′2.5″E

Geography
- Location: Graubünden, Switzerland
- Parent range: Oberhalbstein Range

The Tscheischhorn is a mountain of the Oberhalbstein Alps, overlooking Juf in Graubünden, Switzerland.
