= Bles =

Bles may refer to:

- Bles Bridges, South African singer
- David Bles (1821–1899), Dutch painter
- Geoffrey Bles (1886–1957), British publisher
- Herri met de Bles (c.1510–c.1555–1560), Flemish painter

== See also ==
- Chantemerle-les-Blés, commune in the Drôme department in southeastern France
- Piz Bles, mountain in the Oberhalbstein Alp
