= Piz Bles =

Mountain in Switzerland

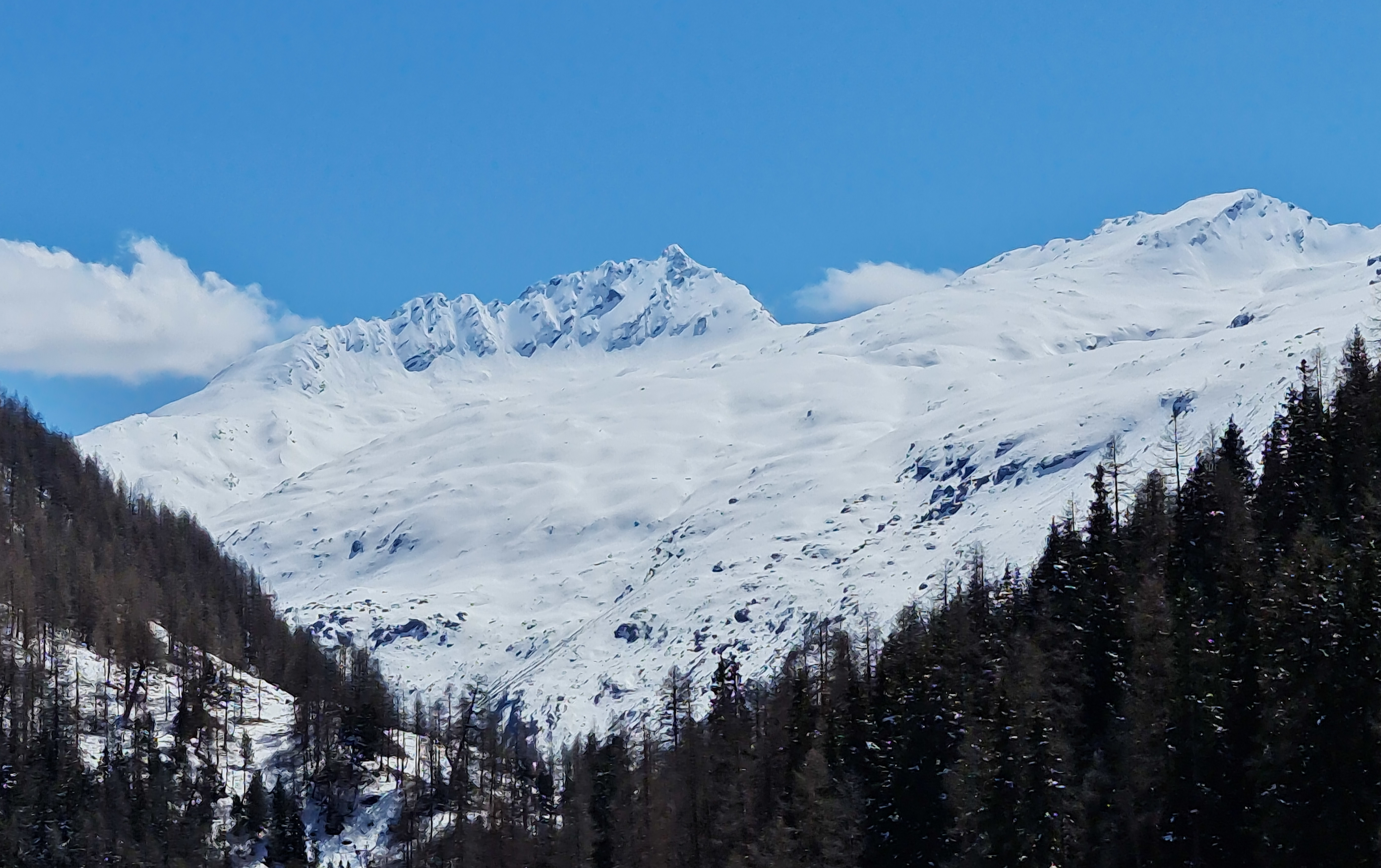
- Piz Bles seen from Cröt

Highest point
- Elevation: 3,045 m (9,990 ft)
- Prominence: 190 m (620 ft)
- Parent peak: Cima da Lägh
- Coordinates: 46°23′54″N 9°28′01″E

Geography
- Location within Alps
- Location: Lombardy, Italy; Graubünden, Switzerland
- Parent range: Oberhalbstein Alps

Piz Bles is a mountain in the Oberhalbstein Alps, located on the border between Italy (Lombardy) and Switzerland (Graubünden). On its northwestern side lies the lake Lago di Lei.
