= Piz Surparé =

Mountain in Switzerland

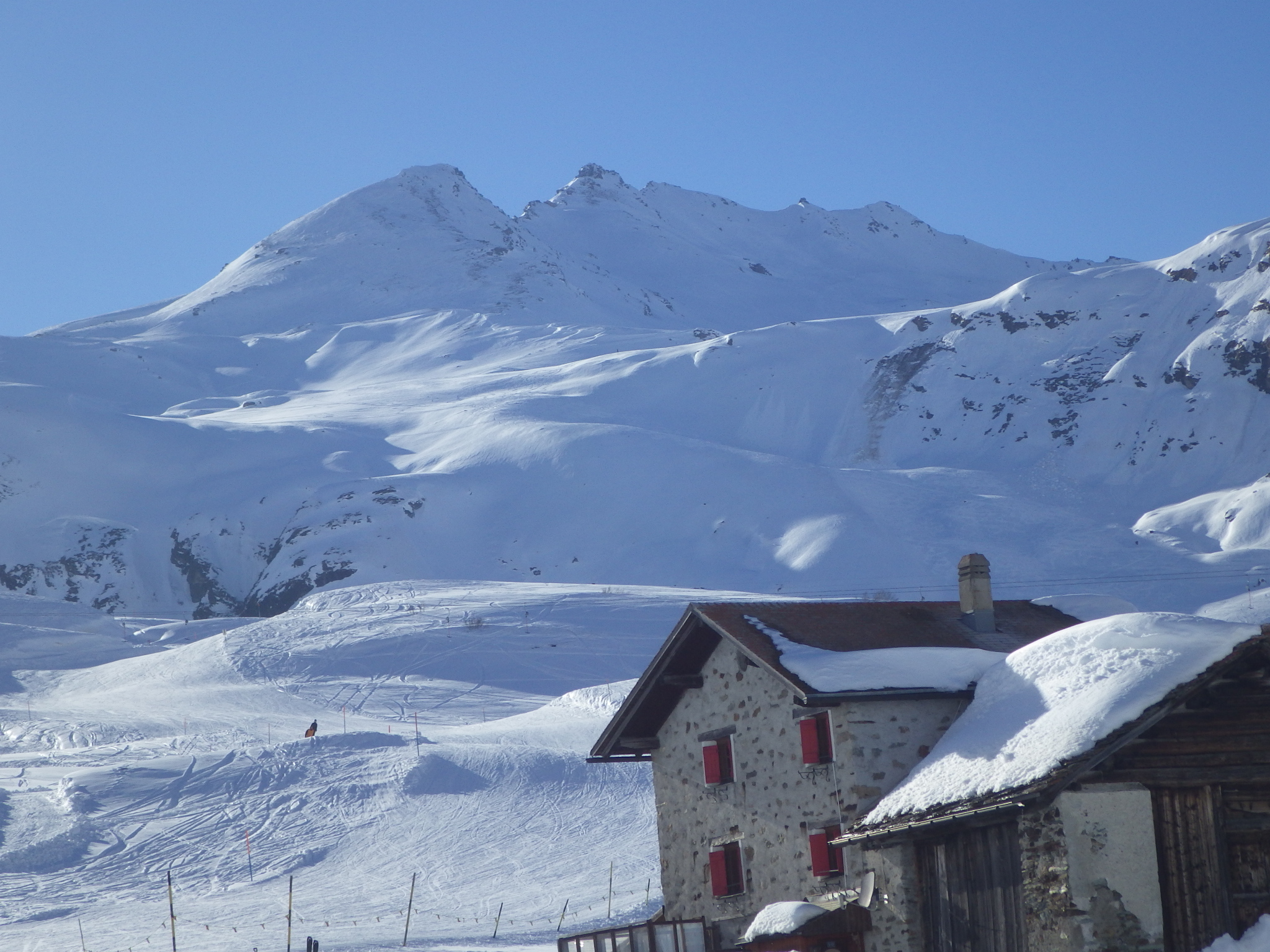
- Piz Surparé as seen from Tua

Highest point
- Elevation: 3,078 m (10,098 ft)
- Prominence: 241 m (791 ft)
- Parent peak: Piz Platta
- Coordinates: 46°27′54″N 9°35′44″E

Geography
- Location within Switzerland
- Location: Graubünden, Switzerland
- Parent range: Oberhalbstein Alps

Piz Surparé (3,078 m) is a mountain of the Oberhalbstein Alps, located west of Bivio in the canton of Graubünden. It is the highest point of the range between the Val Bercla and the lake of Marmorera.
