= Ziteil =

Pilgrimage site in the Swiss Alps

Coordinates: 46°36′44″N 9°30′44″E

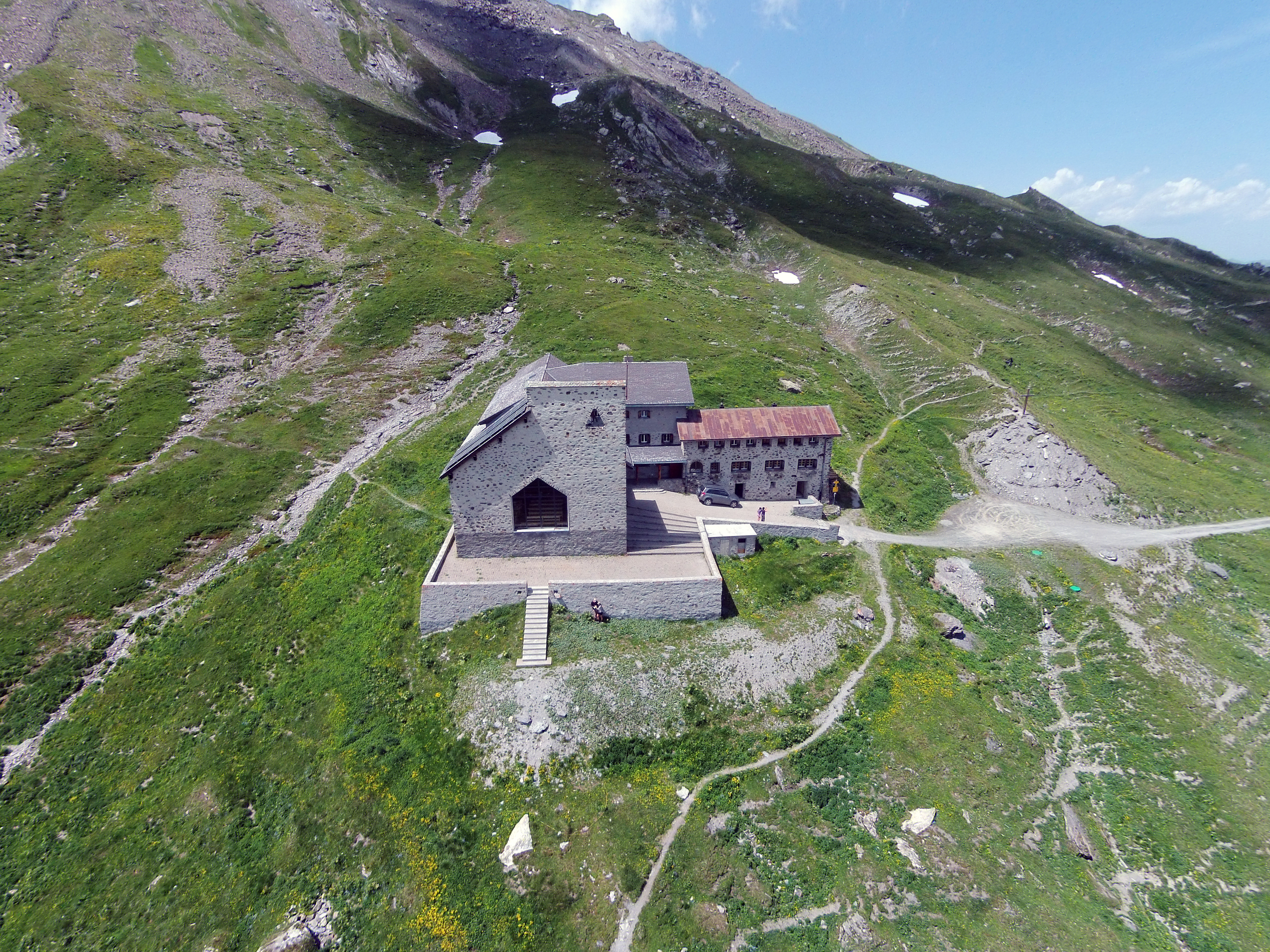
View of Ziteil

Aerial video and interior view of Ziteil

Ziteil is a Roman Catholic pilgrimage site which was purportedly the location of a Marian apparition in the 1500s. The chapel is located at a height of 2,429 metres above sea level, between Piz Curvér and Piz Toissa, in the canton of Graubünden.

It is claimed to be the highest elevation pilgrimage site in Europe.

In 1933, a Catholic theatrical play was premiered in Salouf, written by Alexander Lozza and based on the legend of the Marian apparition.
