= Piz Miez =

Mountain in Switzerland

- Cimalmotta
- Location within Alps

Highest point
- Elevation: 2,835 m (9,301 ft)
- Prominence: 61 m (200 ft)
- Parent peak: Piz dil Crot
- Coordinates: 46°29′53.3″N 9°26′3.5″E

Geography
- Location: Graubünden, Switzerland; Lombardy, Italy
- Parent range: Oberhalbstein Alps

Piz Miez (also known as Cimalmotta) is a mountain of the Oberhalbstein Alps, located on the border between Italy and Switzerland. It lies west of Lago di Lei, on the chain that culminates at Piz Timun.
