= Gletscherhorn (Oberhalbstein Alps) =

Mountain in Switzerland

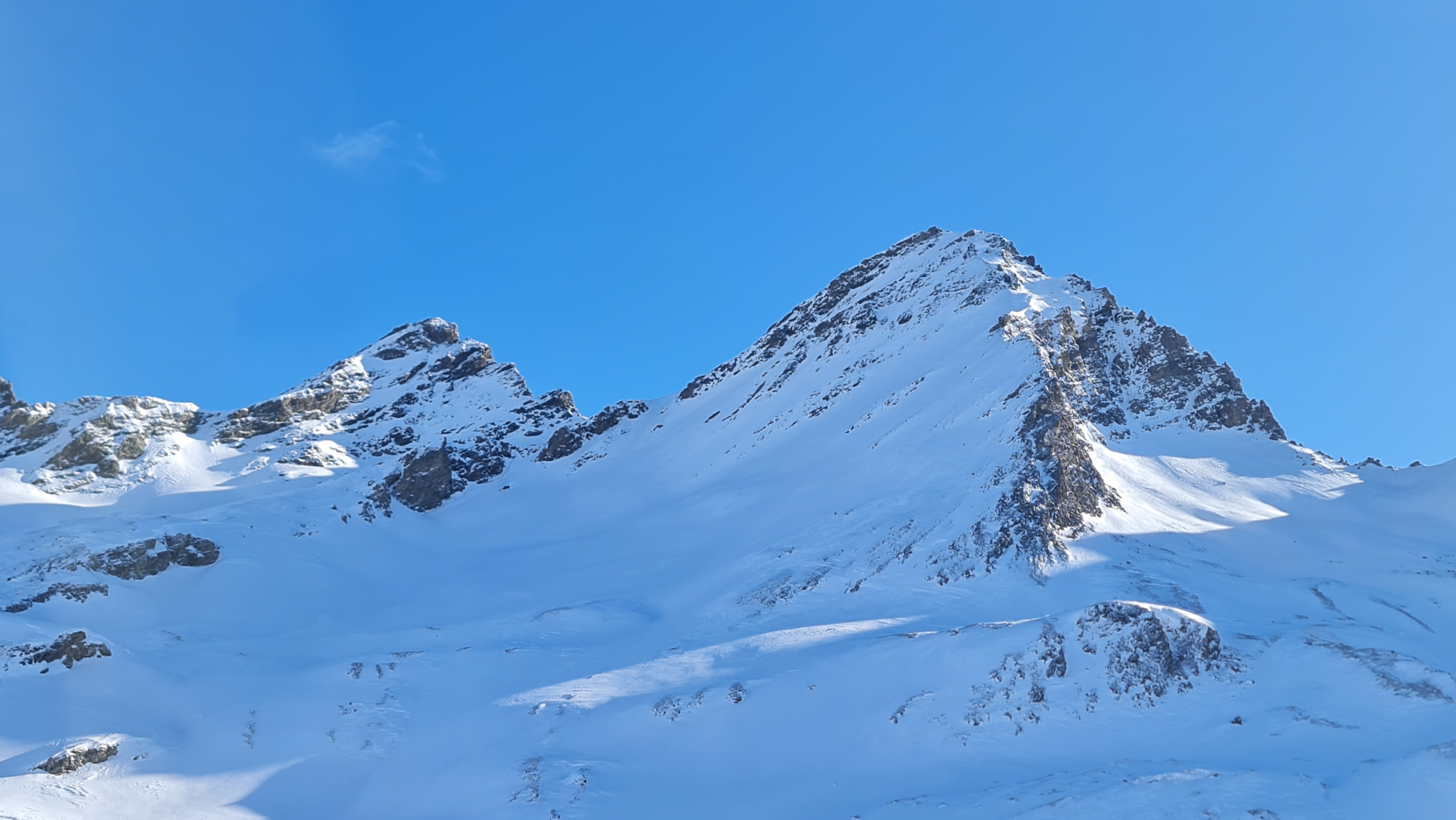
- Gletscherhorn and Piz Predarossa

Highest point
- Elevation: 3,107 m (10,194 ft)
- Prominence: 413 m (1,355 ft)
- Parent peak: Piz Duan
- Listing: Alpine mountains above 3000 m
- Coordinates: 46°23′14″N 9°33′39″E

Geography
- Location within Switzerland
- Location: Graubünden, Switzerland
- Parent range: Oberhalbstein Alps

The Gletscherhorn is a mountain of the Oberhalbstein Alps, located between the valleys of Bergalga and Maroz, in the canton of Graubünden. It is situated north-west of Piz Duan.
