= Pizz Gallagiun =

Mountain in Switzerland

- Pizzo Galleggione
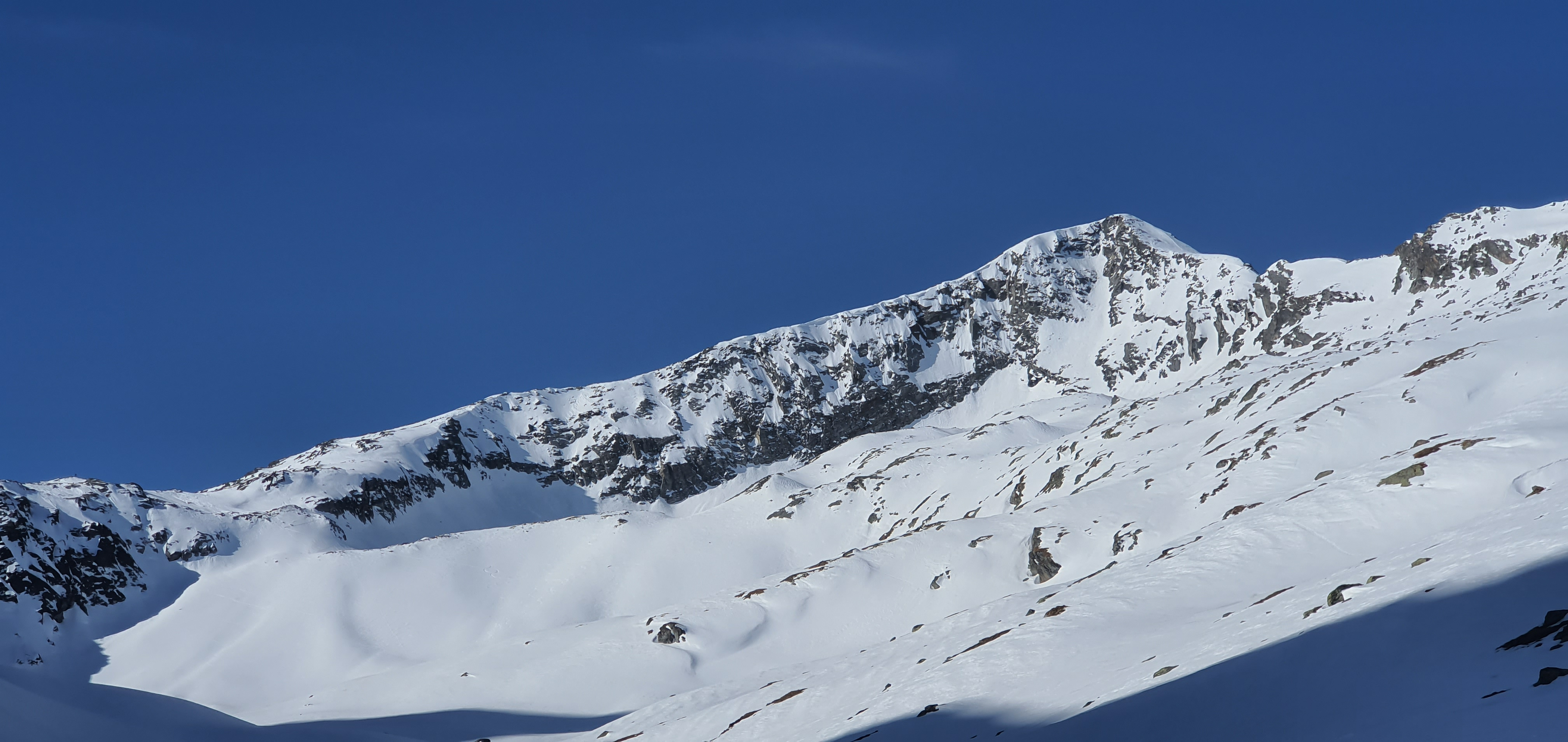
- Pizz Gallagium

Highest point
- Elevation: 3,107 m (10,194 ft)
- Prominence: 413 m (1,355 ft)
- Parent peak: Piz Duan
- Listing: Alpine mountains above 3000 m
- Coordinates: 46°22′00″N 9°29′16″E

Geography
- Location within Alps
- Location: Lombardy, Italy/Graubünden, Switzerland
- Parent range: Oberhalbstein Range

Pizz Gallagiun (also known as Pizzo Galleggione) is a mountain of the Oberhalbstein Range, located on the border between Italy and Switzerland. On its southern side it overlooks the Val Bregaglia. On its northern side it overlooks the Val Madris.
