= Piz Toissa =

Mountain in Switzerland

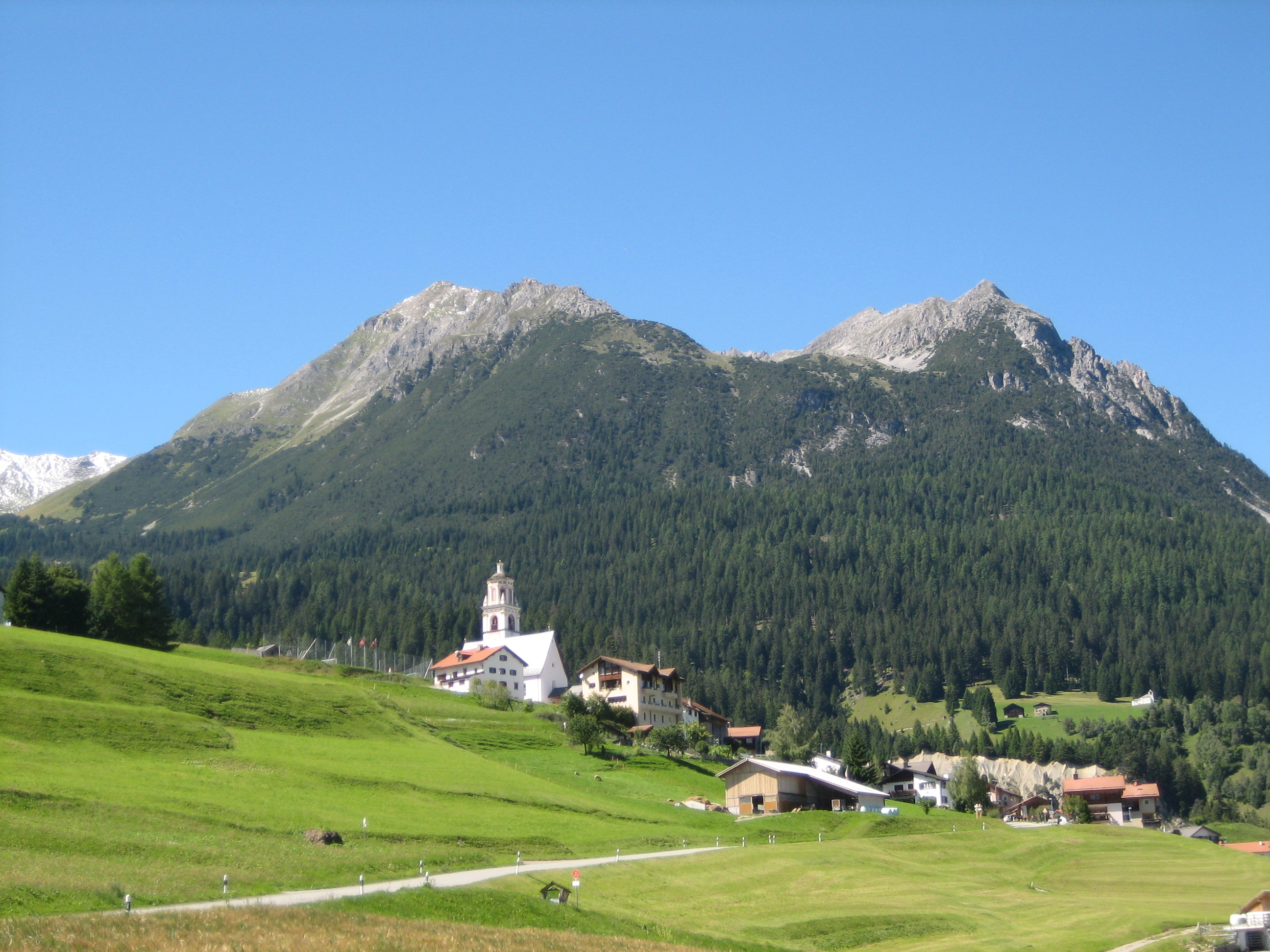
- Piz Toissa with Parsonz from Riom-Parsonz

Highest point
- Elevation: 2,657 m (8,717 ft)
- Prominence: 310 m (1,020 ft)
- Parent peak: Piz Platta
- Coordinates: 46°37′8″N 9°31′29″E

Geography
- Location within Switzerland
- Location: Graubünden, Switzerland
- Parent range: Oberhalbstein Alps

Piz Toissa, aerial video

Piz Toissa is a mountain of the Oberhalbstein Alps, located west of Salouf in the canton of Graubünden.

== Panorama ==
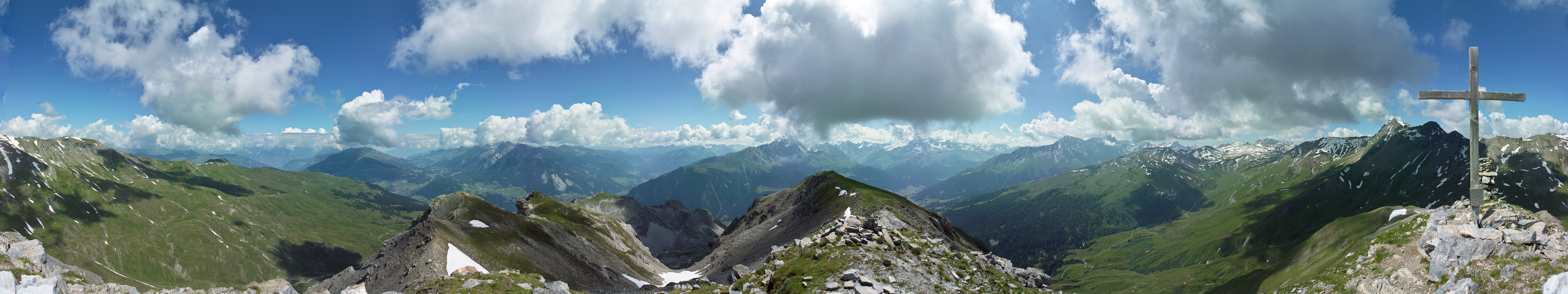
360°-Panorama from Piz Toissa

== Gallery ==
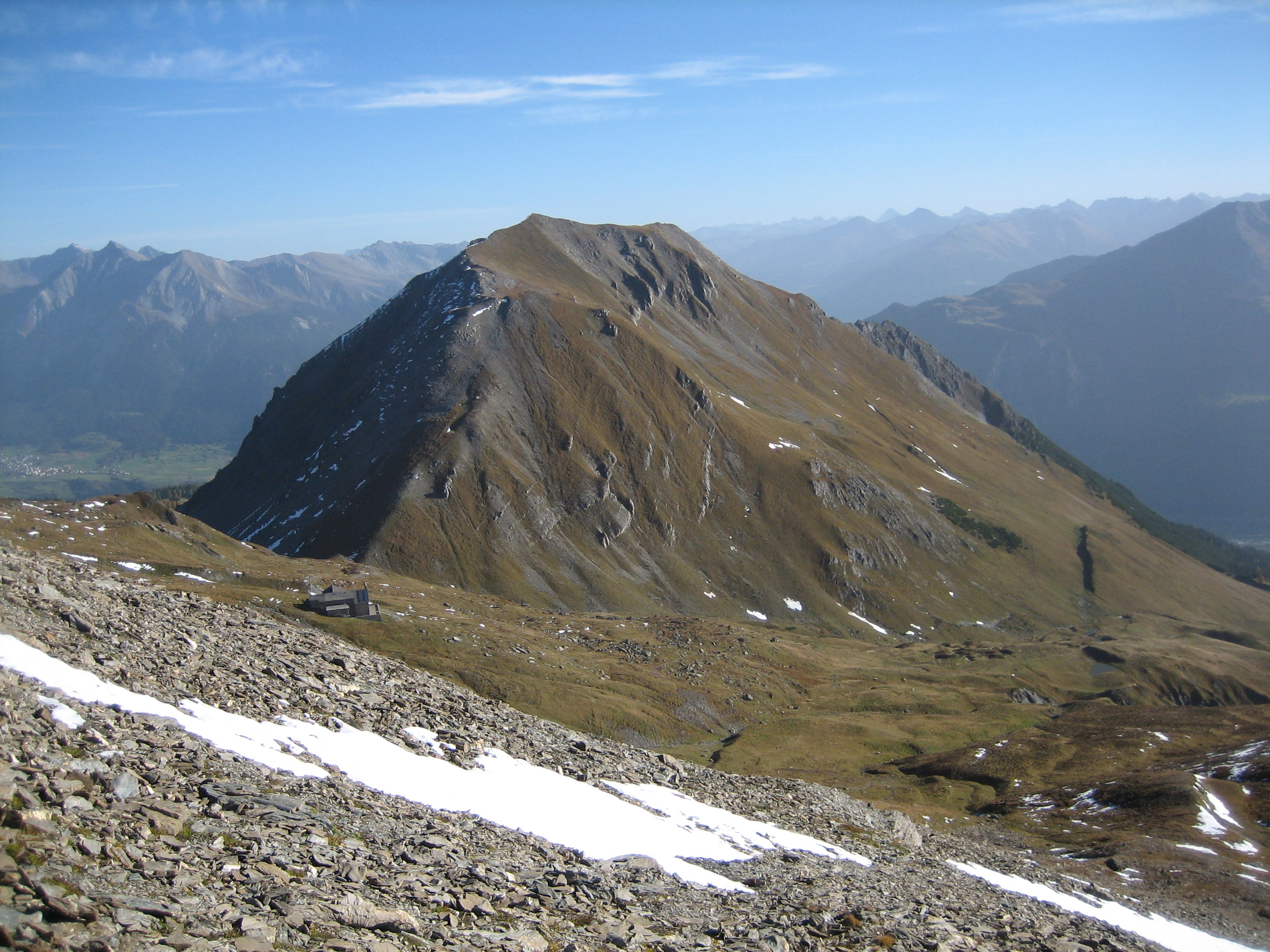
Piz Toissa and Ziteil from Piz Curvér

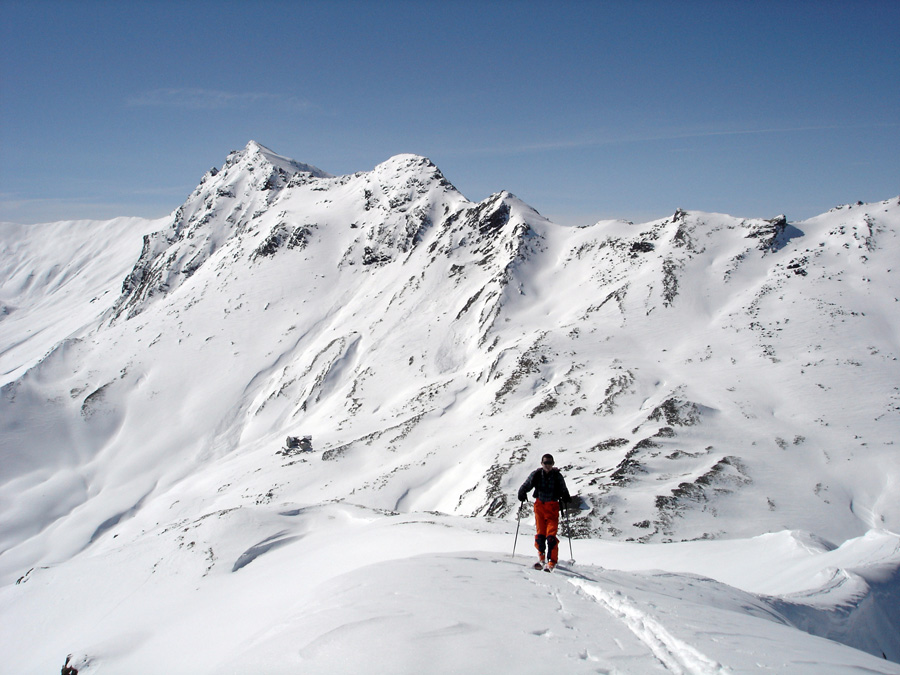
Climb to Piz Toissa

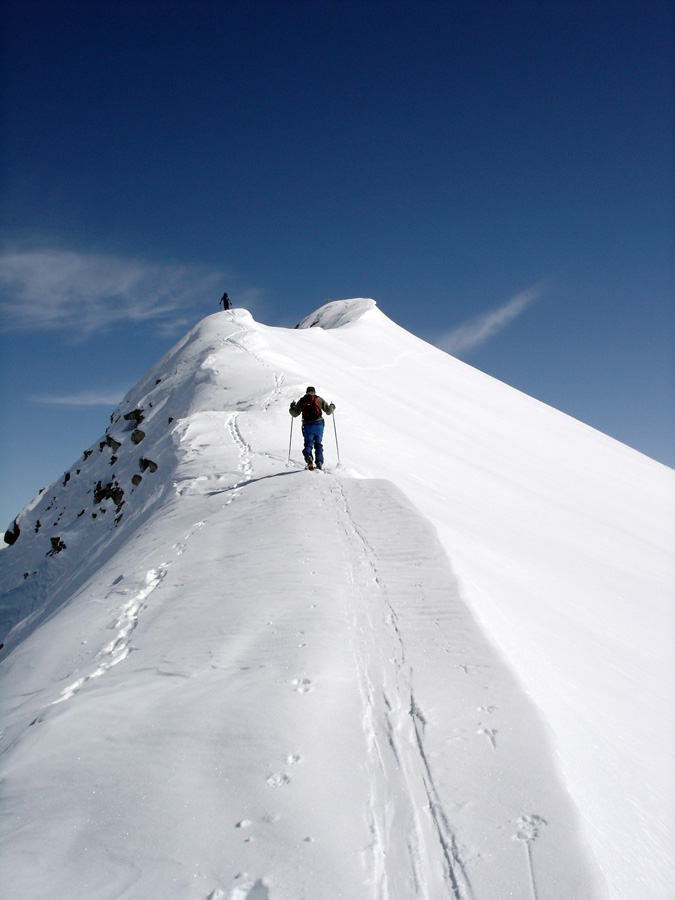
Climb to Piz Toissa

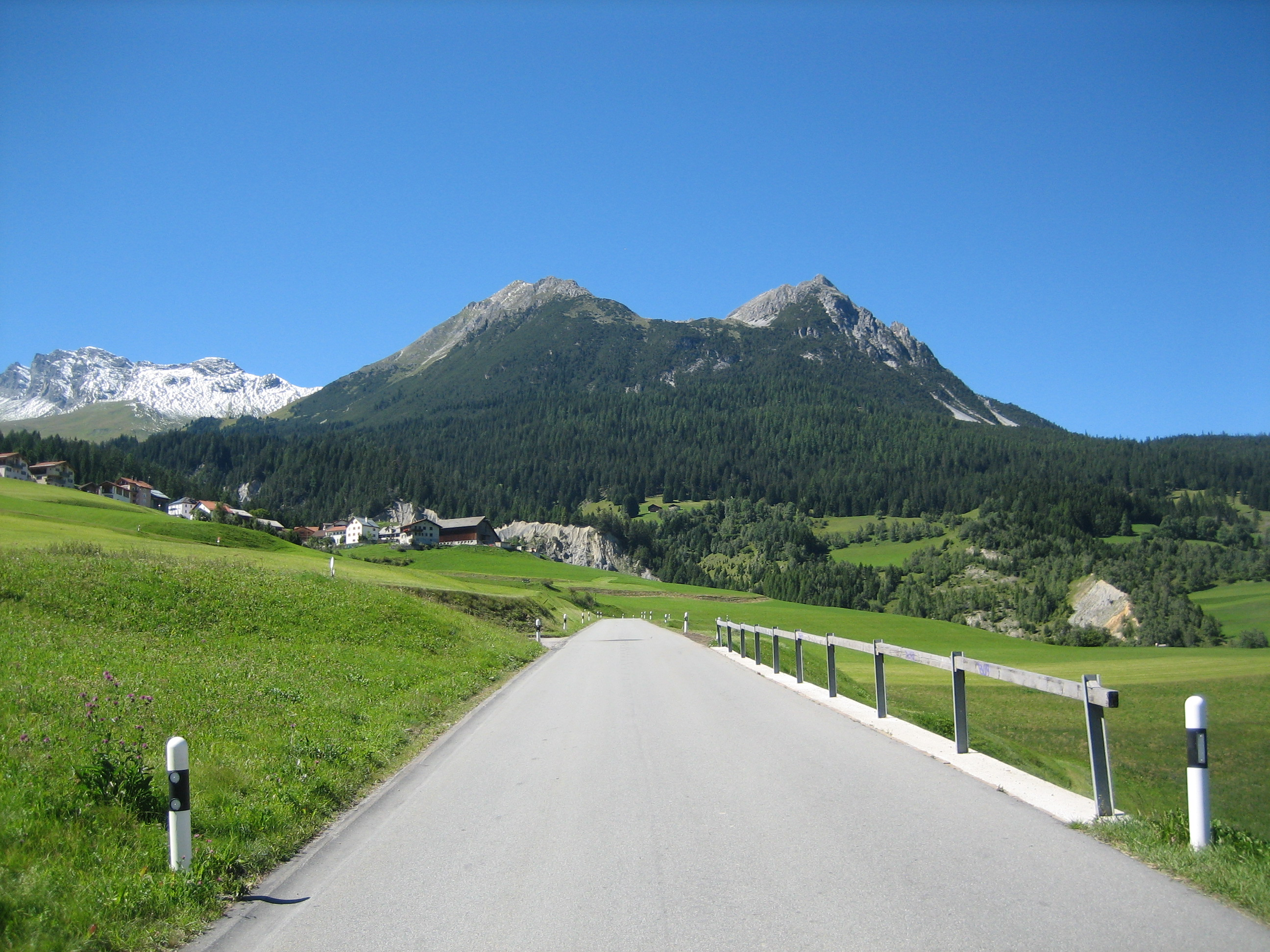
Piz Toissa with road from Riom
