= Piz Forbesch =

Mountain in Switzerland

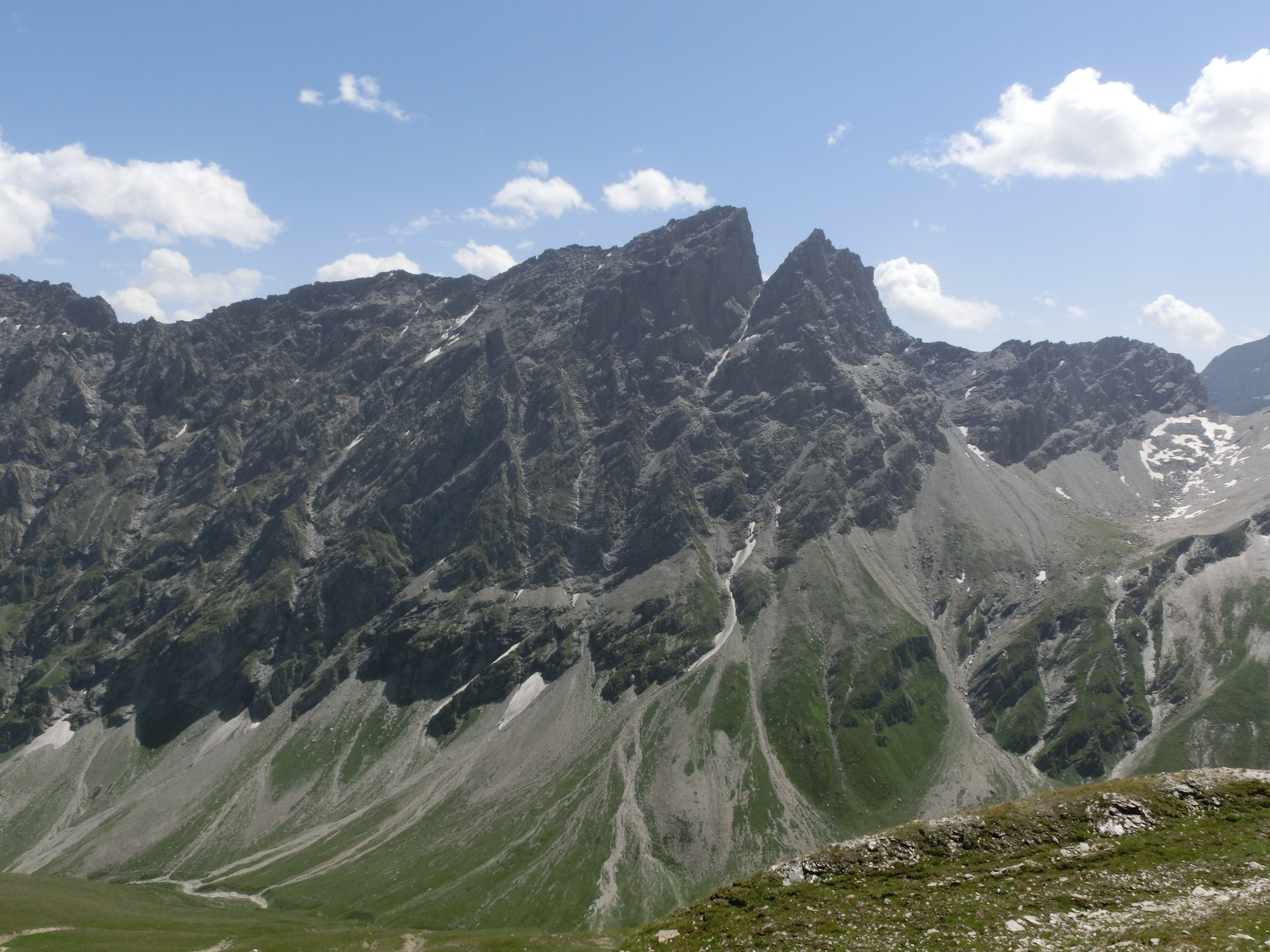
- Piz Forbesch from Piz Mez (west side)

Highest point
- Elevation: 3,262 m (10,702 ft)
- Prominence: 601 m (1,972 ft)
- Parent peak: Piz Platta
- Listing: Alpine mountains above 3000 m
- Coordinates: 46°31′13.1″N 9°33′33″E

Geography
- Location within Switzerland
- Location: Graubünden, Switzerland
- Parent range: Oberhalbstein Alps

Piz Forbesch, aerial video

Piz Forbesch is a mountain of the Oberhalbstein Alps, located near Mulegns in the Swiss canton of Graubünden. It lies approximately 3 kilometres north of Piz Platta.
