= Cima da Lägh =

Mountain in Switzerland

- Cima di Lago
- Location within Alps

Highest point
- Elevation: 3,083 m (10,115 ft)
- Prominence: 422 m (1,385 ft)
- Parent peak: Pizzo Stella
- Listing: Alpine mountains above 3000 m
- Coordinates: 46°22′34.7″N 9°27′39.9″E

Geography
- Location: Lombardy, Italy/Graubünden, Switzerland
- Parent range: Oberhalbstein Range

Cima da Lägh (also known as Cima di Lago) is a mountain in the Oberhalbstein Range of the Alps, located on the border between Italy and Switzerland. On its southern side it overlooks the Val Bregaglia.
