= Alexander Lozza =

Swiss writer

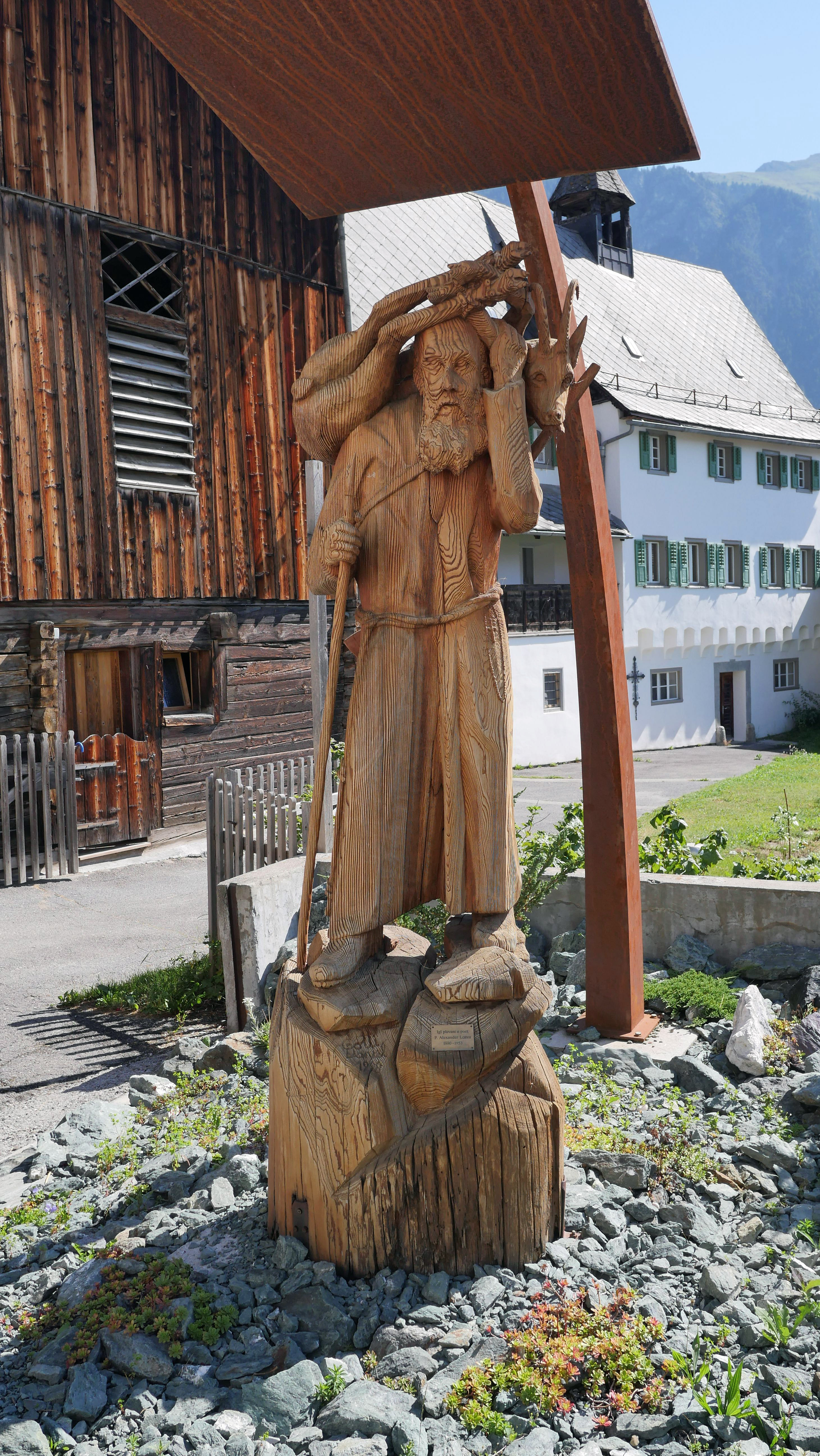
- Wooden statue of Alexander Lozza in Salouf.
- Born: June 27, 1880; Marmorera, Grisons, Switzerland
- Died: February 13, 1953 (aged 72); Tiefencastel, Grisons, Switzerland
- Occupation(s): Priest & preacher Writer of poetry

Alexander Lozza, OFMCap (Marmorera, 27 June 1880 - Tiefencastel, 13 February 1953) was a Swiss Catholic priest from Graubünden. He wrote poetry in Italian and Romansh language, especially in the Surmiran dialect.

== Biography ==
Born in a big family, he was originally christened Constantin. At age 15 he was sent to a Catholic school in Genoa; back then, he started writing poetry in Italian. At age 20 he entered the Capuchin society, where he adopted the name Alexander. Some years afterwards, already a priest, he started presiding over several Catholic parishes in his canton. People liked his preaches and encouraged him to write poetry in Romansh. He was also fond of hunting and photography.

In his theatrical play L’appariziung da Nossadonna da Ziteil, which premiered in 1933, he portrays a local legend of a Marian Apparition back in 1580. Nowadays, in the place of the apparition stands the church of Ziteil, near Salouf.

Alexander Lozza was uncle of Duri Loza (1920–2012), who was parish priest of Salouf between 1949 and 2012, and custodian of Ziteil sanctuary between 1950 and 1999. Loza devoted himself to publishing his uncle's work and to the translation of church songs into Romansh.

The work of Alexander Lozza was published in the 1950s. In 1951 appeared the collection Ziteil and, in 1954, Poesias. His poems are frequently published in Romansh-language schoolbooks.

== Bibliography ==
- Lucia Walther: Alexander Lozza in German, French and Italian in the online Historical Dictionary of Switzerland, 26 August 2010.
- Pader Alexander Lozza, 1880-1953 (in Romansh). Ediziun dall'Uniung rumantscha da Surmeir. 1980.
