= Piz Arlos =

Mountain in Graubünden, Switzerland

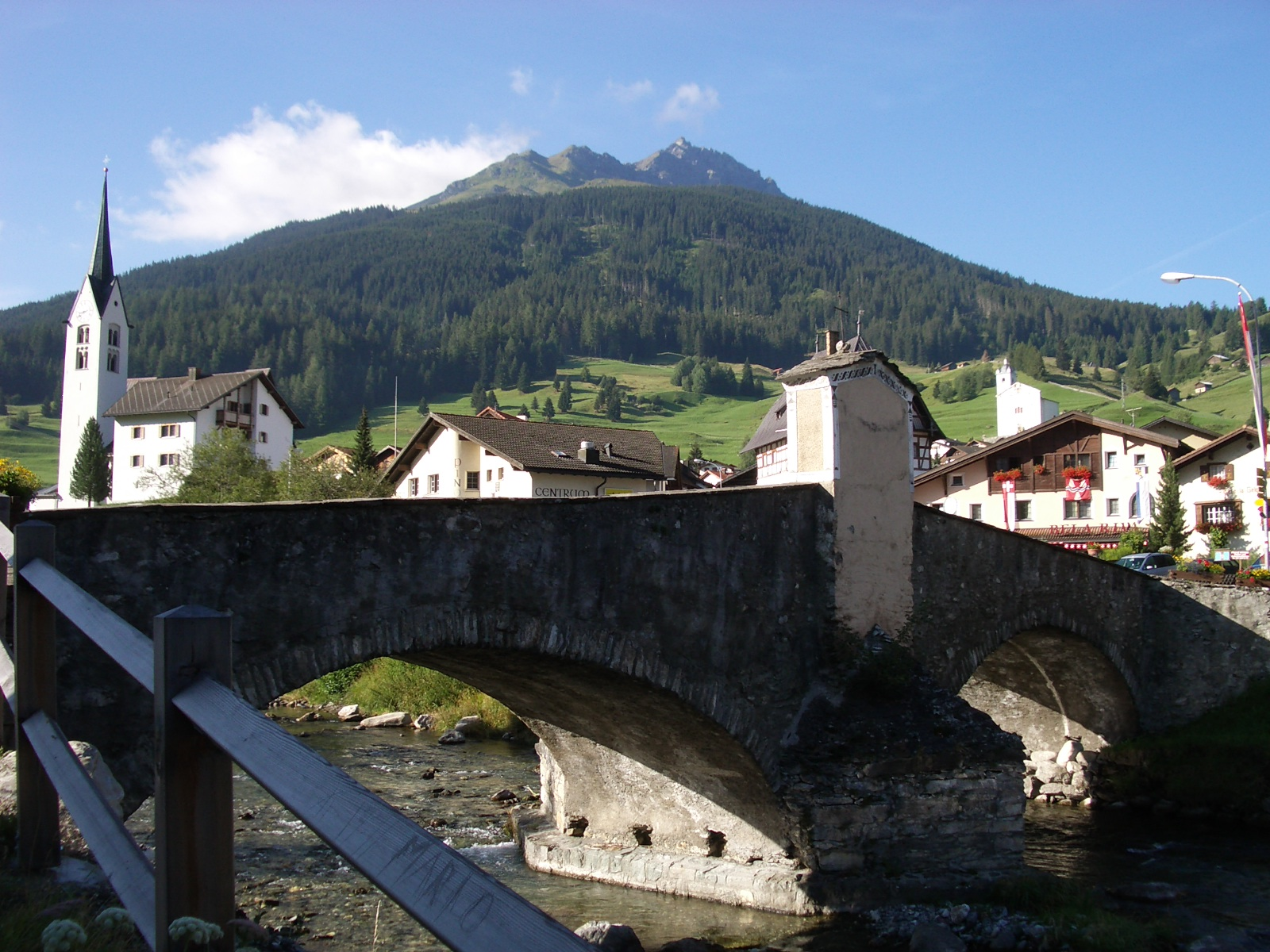
- Piz Arlos from Savognin

Highest point
- Elevation: 2,696.6 m (8,847 ft)
- Coordinates: 46°33′32″N 9°35′02″E

Geography
- Location within Switzerland
- Location: Graubünden, Switzerland
- Parent range: Oberhalbstein Range

Climbing
- Easiest route: Via Tscharnoz

Piz Arlos is a mountain in the Oberhalbstein Range, located near Savognin in Graubünden, Switzerland.
