= Piz Timun =

Mountain in Switzerland

- Pizzo d'Emet
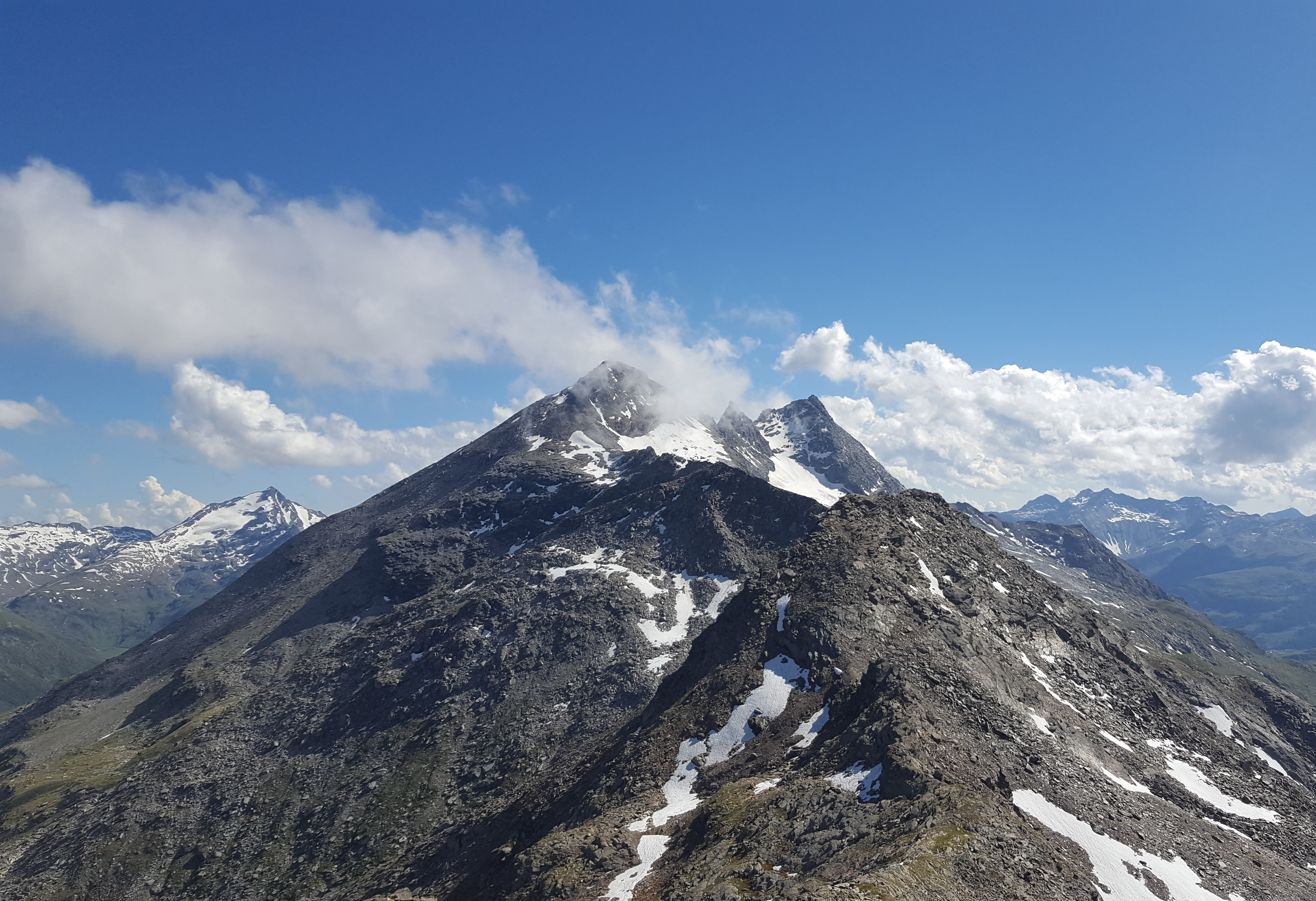
- Piz Timun (peak at the back of the ridge)

Highest point
- Elevation: 3,209 m (10,528 ft)
- Prominence: 823 m (2,700 ft)
- Parent peak: Piz Platta
- Isolation: 10.2 km (6.3 mi)
- Listing: Alpine mountains above 3000 m
- Coordinates: 46°28′01″N 9°24′34″E

Geography
- Location within Alps
- Location: Lombardy, Italy; Graubünden, Switzerland
- Parent range: Oberhalbstein Range

Piz Timun (also known as Pizzo d'Emet) is a mountain of the Oberhalbstein Range, located on the border between Italy and Switzerland. On its eastern side it overlooks the artificial lake Lago di Lei.

== See also ==
- List of mountains of Graubünden
- List of most isolated mountains of Switzerland
