= Pizzo Stella =

Mountain of Lombardy, Italy

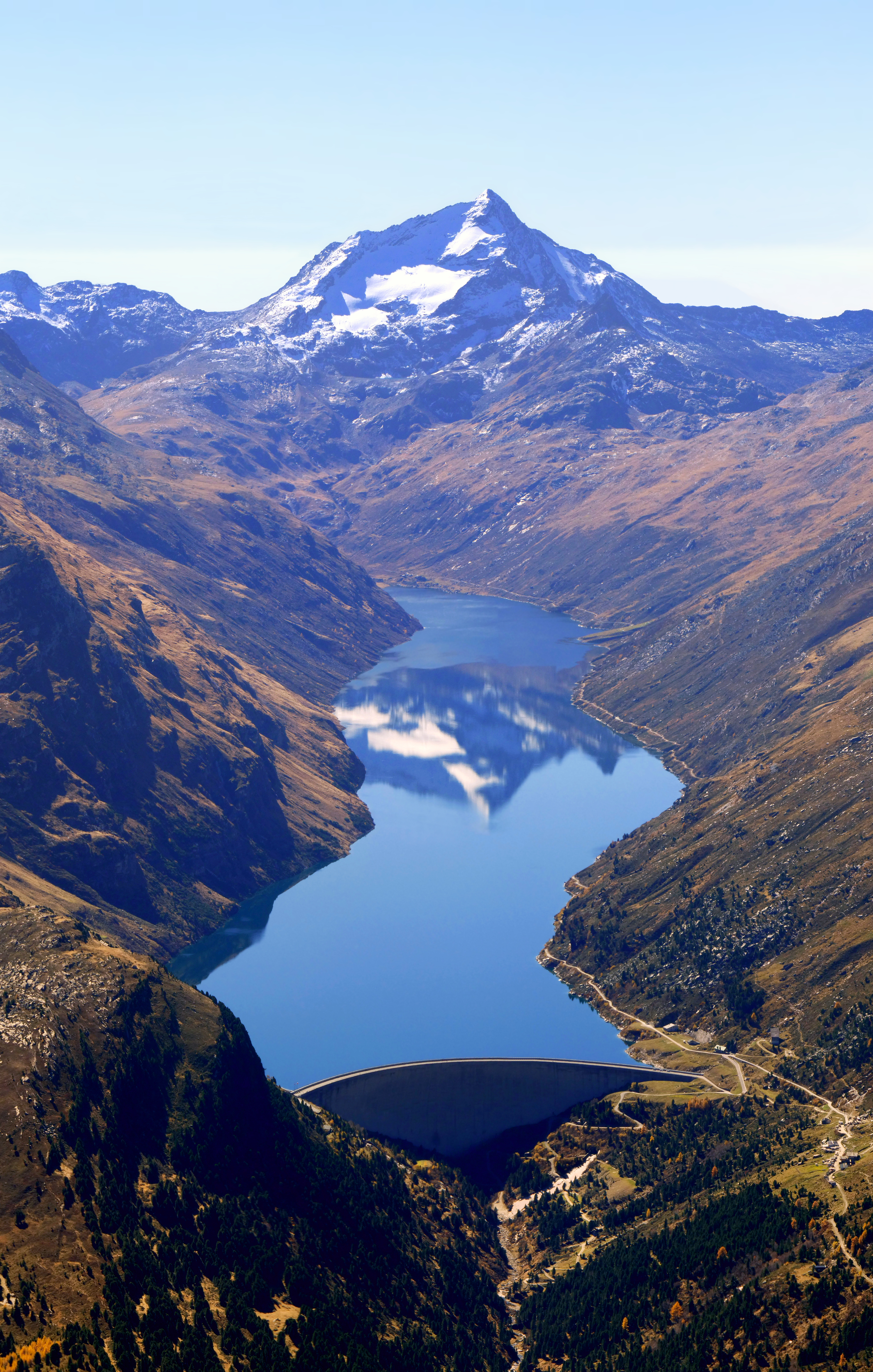
- Pizzo Stella from the slopes of Piz Grisch, with Lago di Lei in the foreground

Highest point
- Elevation: 3,163 m (10,377 ft)
- Prominence: 585 m (1,919 ft)
- Parent peak: Piz Platta
- Listing: Alpine mountains above 3000 m
- Coordinates: 46°22′53″N 9°25′17″E

Geography
- Location within Alps
- Location: Lombardy, Italy

Pizzo Stella or Pizzo Sterla is a mountain of Lombardy, Italy, located north of Chiavenna. On its northern side it overlooks the Valle di Lei and the lake Lago di Lei.
