= Piz Mez =

Mountain in Switzerland

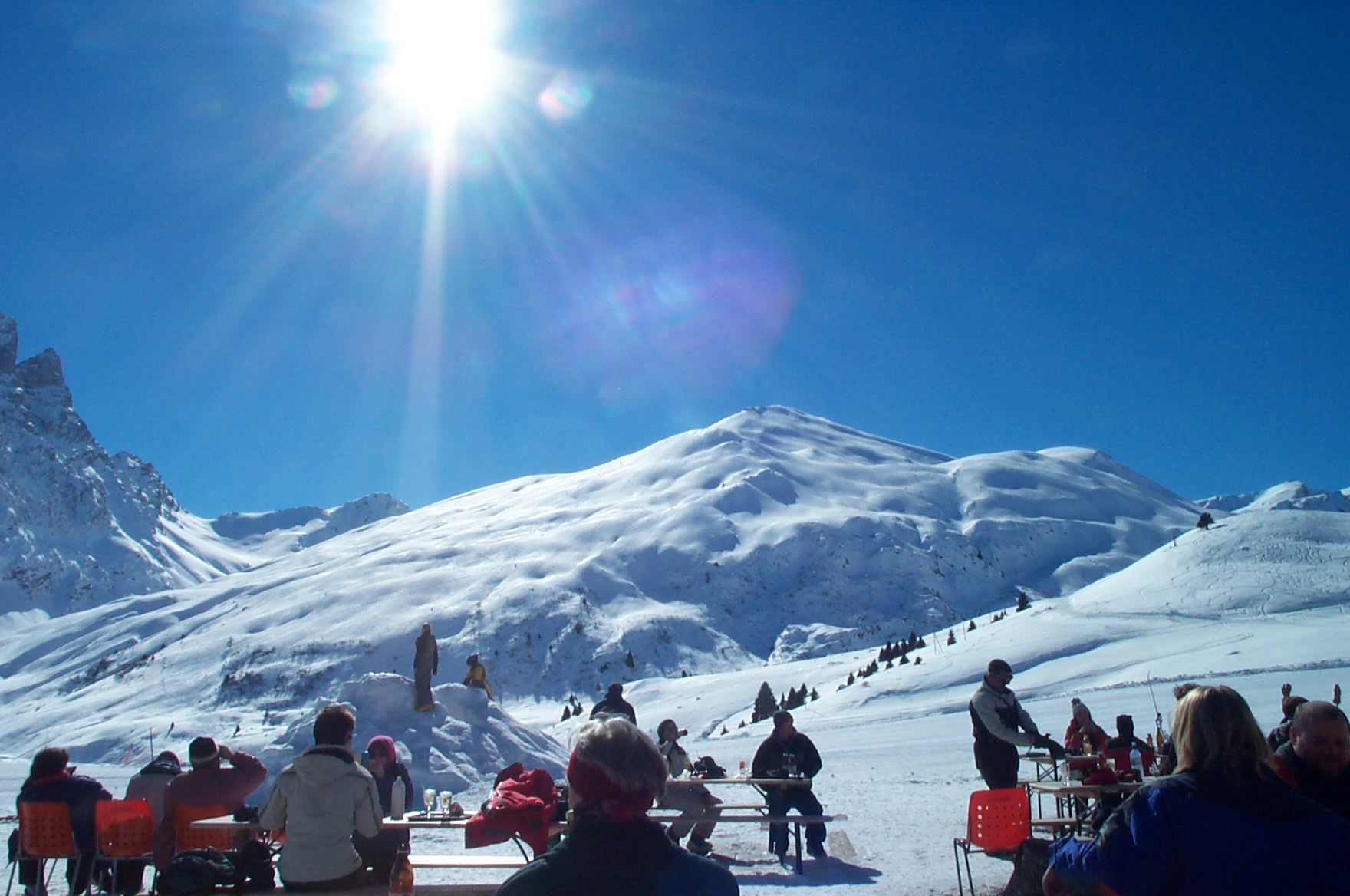
- Piz Mez from Radons

Highest point
- Elevation: 2,718 m (8,917 ft)
- Prominence: 72 m (236 ft)
- Parent peak: Unnamed summit (2,752 m)
- Coordinates: 46°32′1″N 9°32′54″E

Geography
- Location within Switzerland
- Location: Graubünden, Switzerland
- Parent range: Oberhalbstein Alps

Climbing
- Easiest route: From Radons

Piz Mez is a mountain of the Oberhalbstein Alps, located south of Savognin in the canton of Graubünden.
