= Piz Grisch =

Mountain in Switzerland

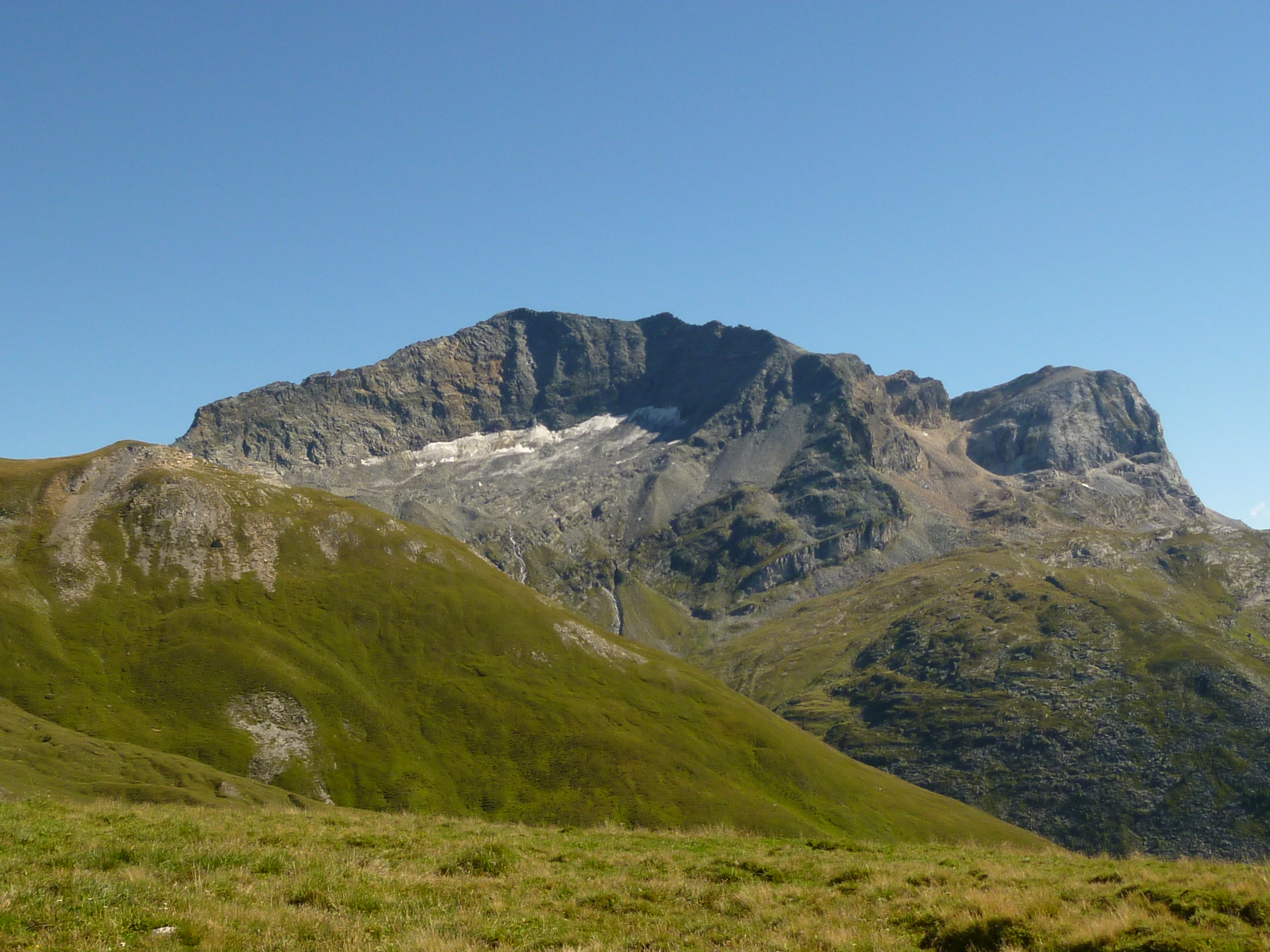
- Piz Grisch from Alp Andies (north side)

Highest point
- Elevation: 3,062 m (10,046 ft)
- Prominence: 546 m (1,791 ft)
- Parent peak: Piz Platta
- Listing: Alpine mountains above 3000 m
- Coordinates: 46°31′52.4″N 9°28′22.6″E

Geography
- Location within Switzerland
- Location: Hinterrhein District, Graubünden, Switzerland
- Parent range: Oberhalbstein Alps

Piz Grisch is a mountain of the Oberhalbstein Alps, overlooking Innerferrera in the Swiss canton of Graubünden. A small glacier lies at the base of its northern face, the Glatscher da Sut Fuina.

== Panorama ==
360° panorama from Piz Grisch
