= Piz Duan =

Mountain in Switzerland

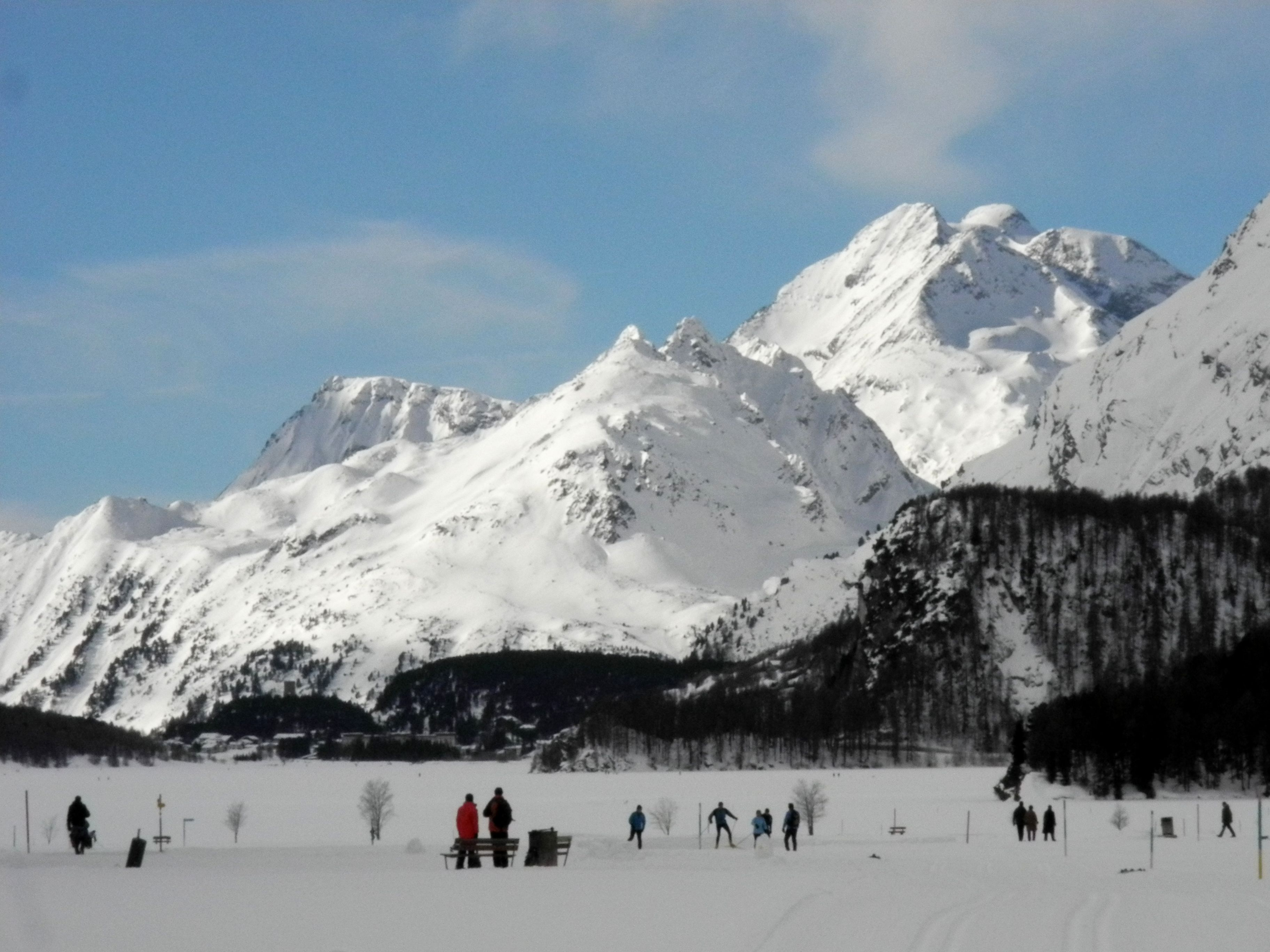
- Piz Duan (The high peak on the right.)

Highest point
- Elevation: 3,131 m (10,272 ft)
- Prominence: 482 m (1,581 ft)
- Parent peak: Pizzo Stella
- Listing: Alpine mountains above 3000 m
- Coordinates: 46°22′33.7″N 9°35′0.6″E

Geography
- Location within Switzerland
- Location: Graubünden, Switzerland
- Parent range: Oberhalbstein Range

Piz Duan is a mountain of the Oberhalbstein Range, overlooking Vicosoprano and the Val Bregaglia, in the Swiss canton of Graubünden.
