= Lago di Lei =

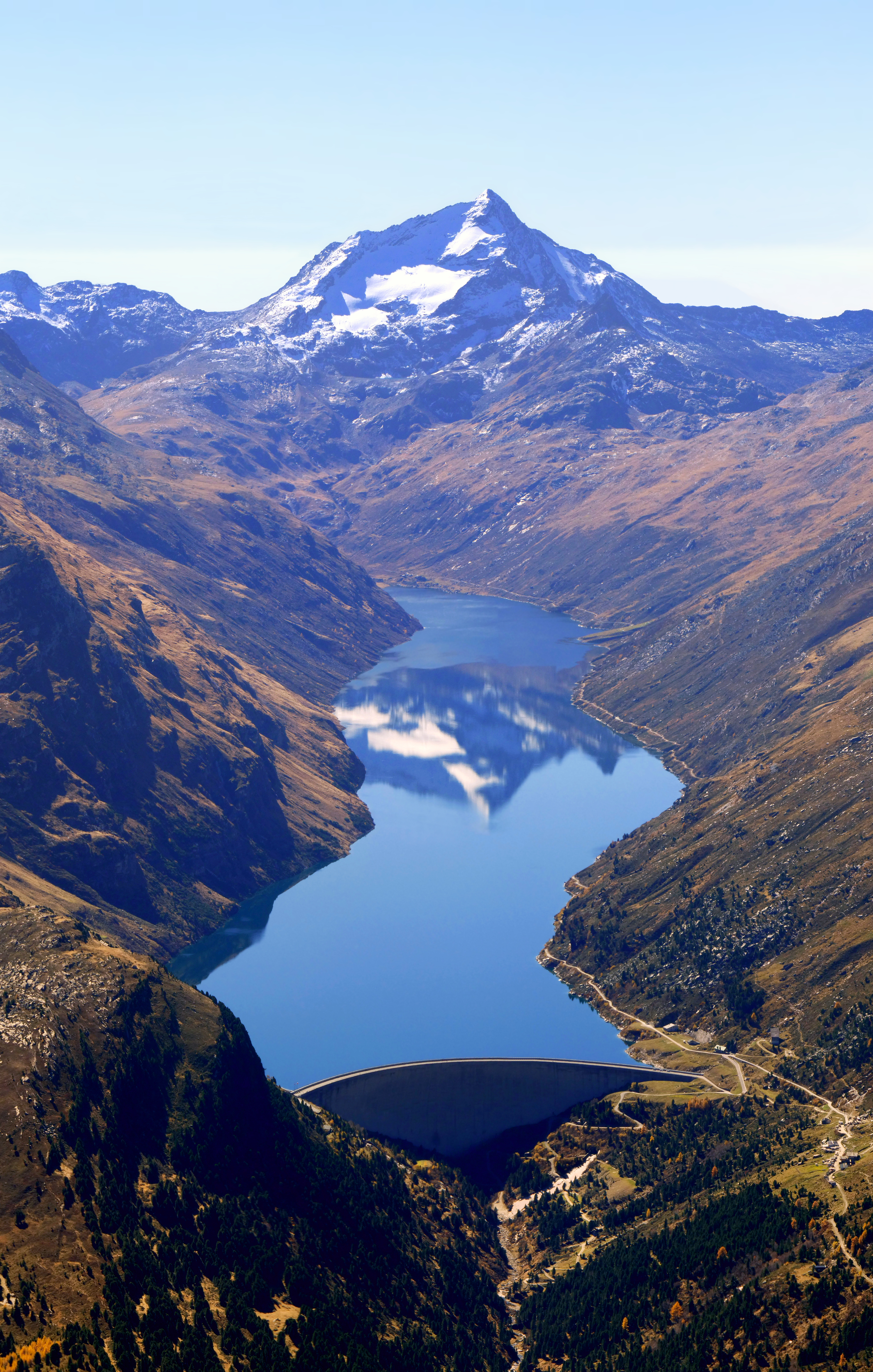

- Location within Canton of Graubünden Location within Switzerland Location within Lombardy Location within Italy Location within Alps
- Interactive map of Lago di Lei
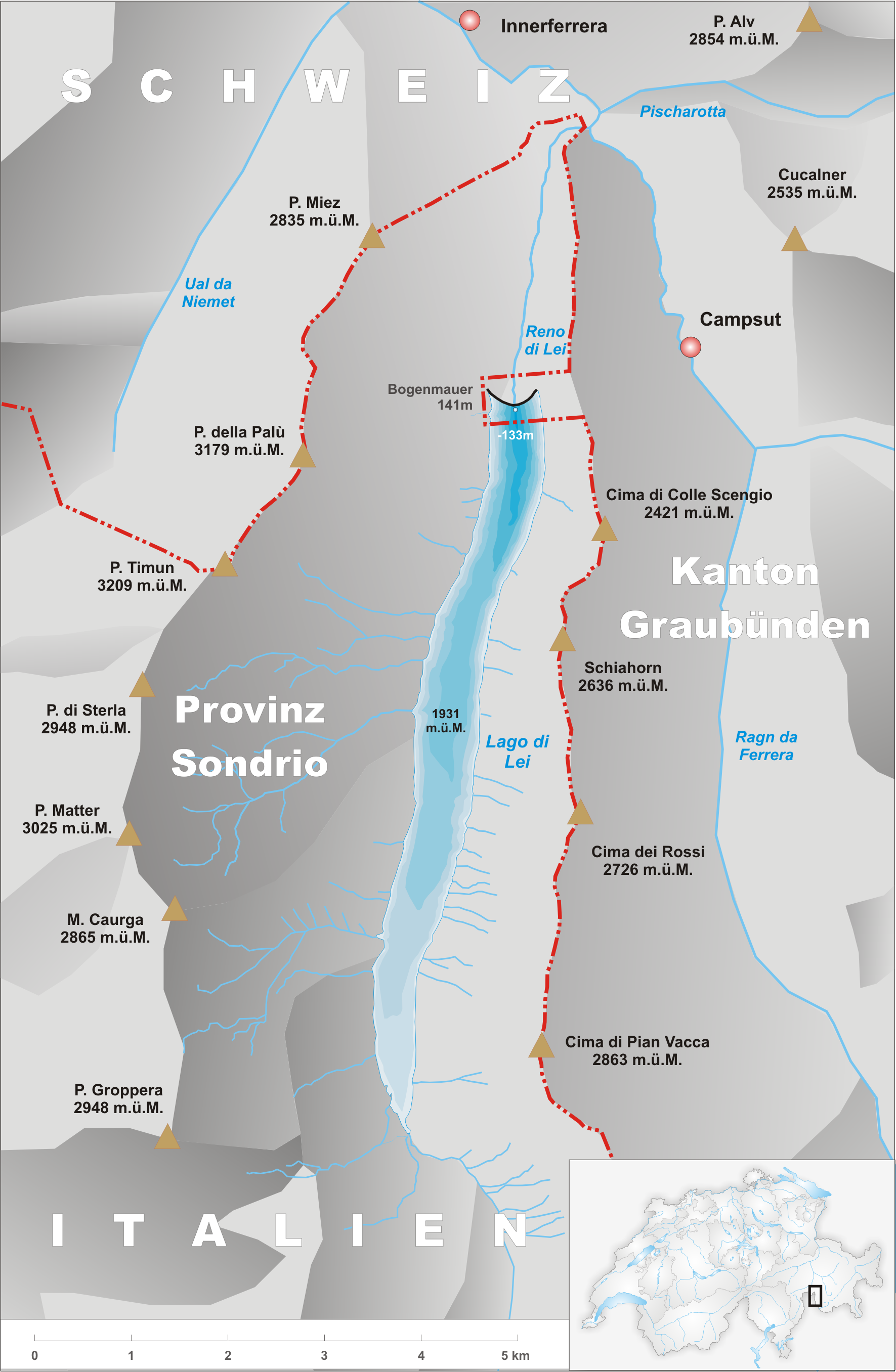
- map
- Location: Lombardy (IT), Grisons (CH)
- Coordinates: 46.483°N 9.455°E
- Type: hydroelectric reservoir
- Primary outflows: Reno di Lei
- Catchment area: 46.5 km^{2} (18.0 sq mi)
- Basin countries: Italy, Switzerland
- Max. length: 7.7 km (4.8 mi)
- Surface area: 4.12 km^{2} (1.59 sq mi)
- Max. depth: 133 m (436 ft)
- Water volume: 197 million cubic metres (160,000 acre⋅ft)
- Surface elevation: 1,931 m (6,335 ft)

Lago di Lei (Lombard: Lach de Lei) is a reservoir in the Valle di Lei, powering the Hinterrhein storage power stations. The reservoir is almost entirely in Italy, but the barrage was built on territory ceded by Italy to Switzerland (municipality of Ferrera, Grisons) in 1955 after diplomatic talks, while an equivalent sized territory further north of the lake was ceded to Italy in the exchange. The dam is operated by Kraftwerke Hinterrhein. The waters of the lake are the only waters in Italian territory that drain to the North Sea, being part of the Rhine's drainage basin. Other waters of Italy that do not flow to the Mediterranean Sea are found in the valley of Livigno, valley of Sexten, Puster Valley east of Innichen, and most of the waters of the municipality of Tarvisio east of Sella Nevea: all these waters flow to the Black Sea through the basin of the Danube.

== See also ==
- List of lakes of Switzerland
- List of mountain lakes of Switzerland
