= Oberhalbstein Alps =

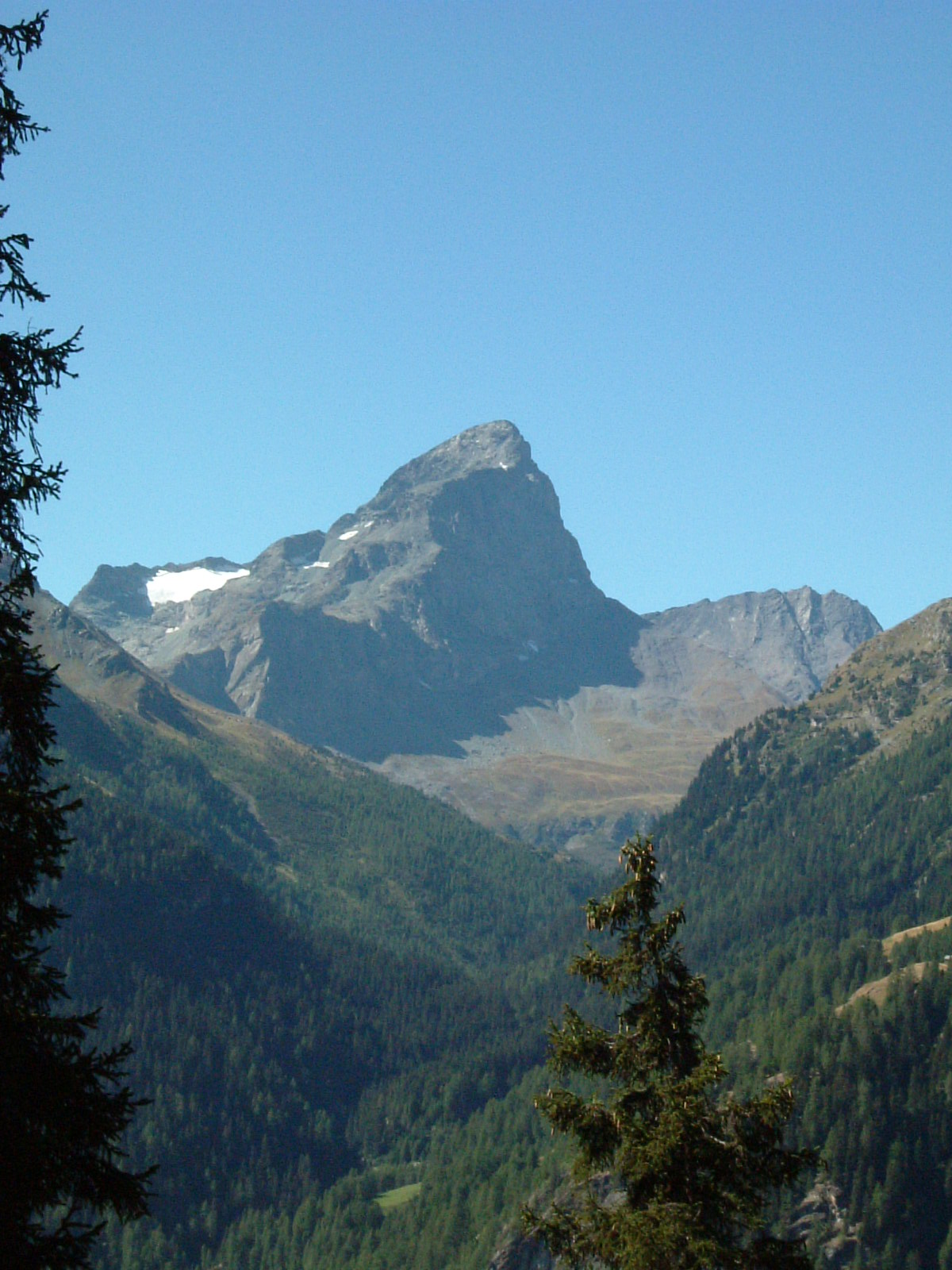
- Piz Platta

Highest point
- Peak: Piz Platta
- Elevation: 3,386 m (11,109 ft)
- Coordinates: 46°29′13.1″N 9°33′42.2″E

Geography
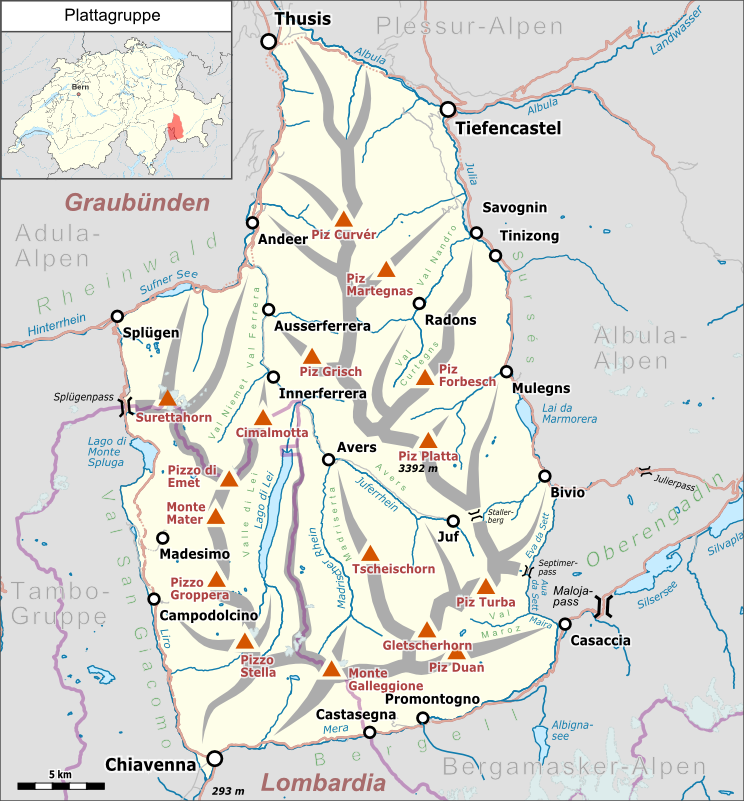
- Oberhalbstein Alps; The borders of the range according to Alpine Club classification of the Eastern Alps
- Countries: Switzerland; Italy
- States: Graubünden; Lombardy
- Range coordinates: 46°27.3′N 9°30.45′E
- Parent range: Central Eastern Alps

The Oberhalbstein Alps (German: Oberhalbsteiner Alpen) or Platta Group (Italian: Alpi del Platta) are a mountain range in the Alps of eastern Switzerland and northern Italy. They are considered to be part of the Central Eastern Alps. The Oberhalbstein Alps are separated from the Lepontine Alps in the west by the Splügen Pass; from the Plessur Alps in the north by the river Albula; from the Albula Alps in the east by the Septimer Pass and the river Gelgia; from the Bernina Range in the south by the Val Bregaglia.

The Oberhalbstein Alps are drained by the rivers Hinterrhein, Gelgia, Liro and Mera.

== Peaks ==
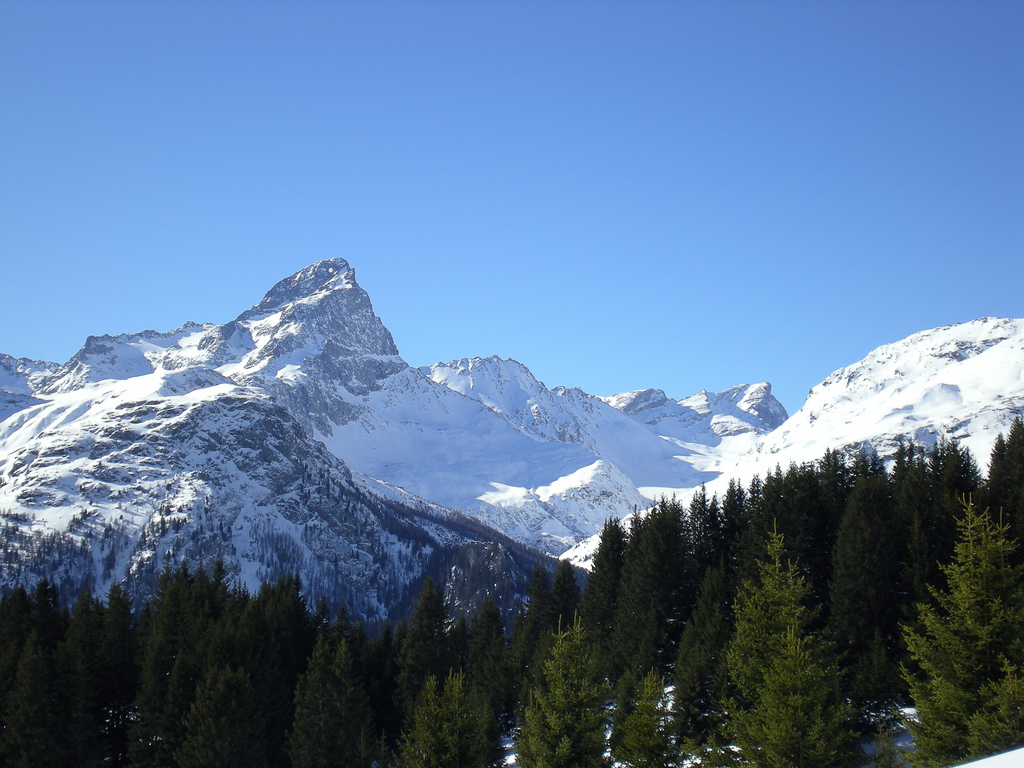
Piz Platta

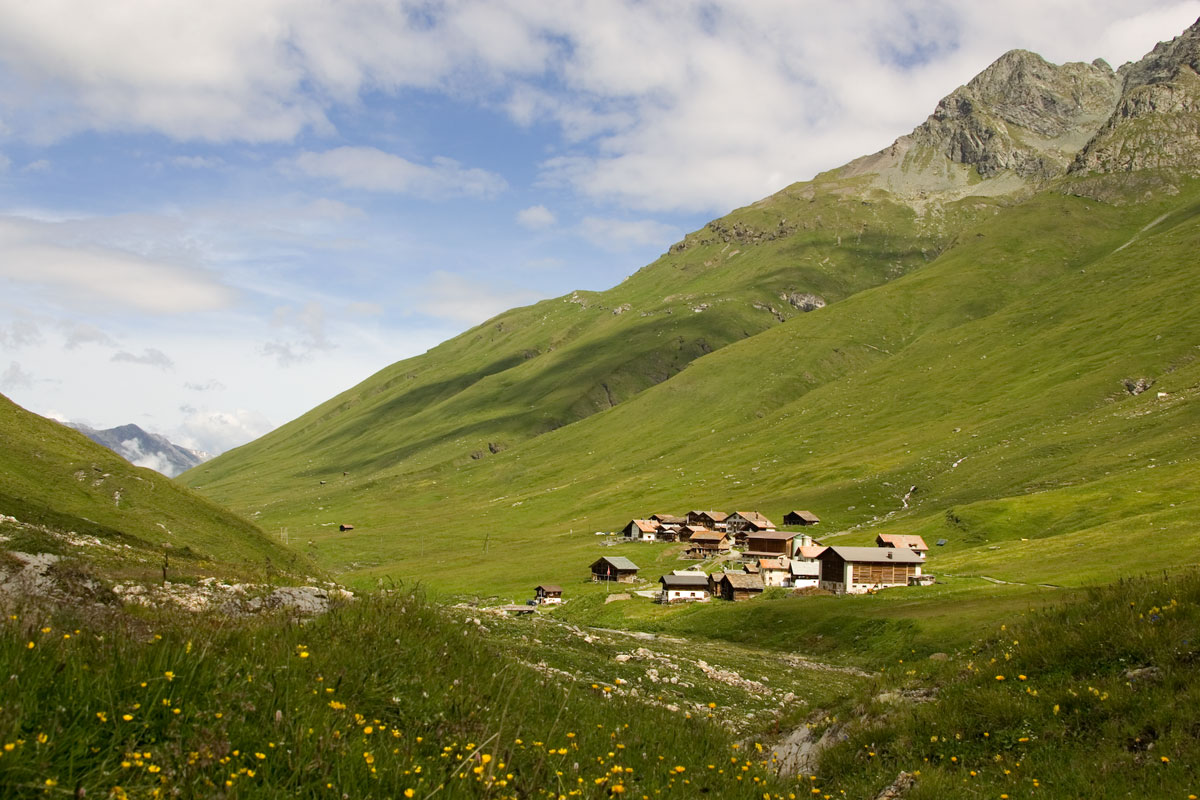
Juf

The main peaks of the Oberhalbstein Alps are:

Peak	Elevation	
Peak	m	ft
Piz Platta	3392	11,129
Piz Forbesch	3258	10,689
Piz Timun	3201	10,502
Pizzo Stella	3163	10,375
Piz Duan	3133	10,279
Pizz Gallagiun	3107	10,200
Gletscherhorn	3106	10,191
Cima da Lägh	3082	10,112
Piz Grisch	3062	10,050
Usser Wissberg	3053	10,016
Piz Bles	3045	9,990
Surettahorn	3027	9,971
Tscheischhorn	3019	9,905
Piz Curvér	2975	9,761
Piz Alv	2854	9,365
Piz Miez	2835	9,301
Sur Carungas	2829	9,281
Piz Mez	2718	8,917
Piz Arlos	2696	8,847

== Passes ==
The main mountain passes of the Oberhalbstein Alps are:

Mountain pass	location	type	elevation	
Mountain pass	location	type	m	ft
Passo della Duana	Avers to the Val Bregaglia	snow	2800	9187
Passo da la Prasignola	Avers to Soglio	cattle path	2720	8924
Forcella di Lago or Madris Pass	Avers to Chiavenna	footpath	2680	8793
Forcellina	Avers to the Septimer Pass	footpath	2673	8770
Passo di Lei	Avers to Chiavenna	footpath	2659	8724
Stallerberg	Avers to Bivio	footpath	2584	8478
Pass da Sett (Septimer Pass)	Bivio to Val Bregaglia	bridle path	2311	7582
Pass da Niemet	Innerferrera to Madesimo	footpath	2280	7481

== See also ==
- Swiss Alps
- List of mountain groups in the Alpine Club classification of the Eastern Alps
