= Piz Platta =

Mountain in Switzerland

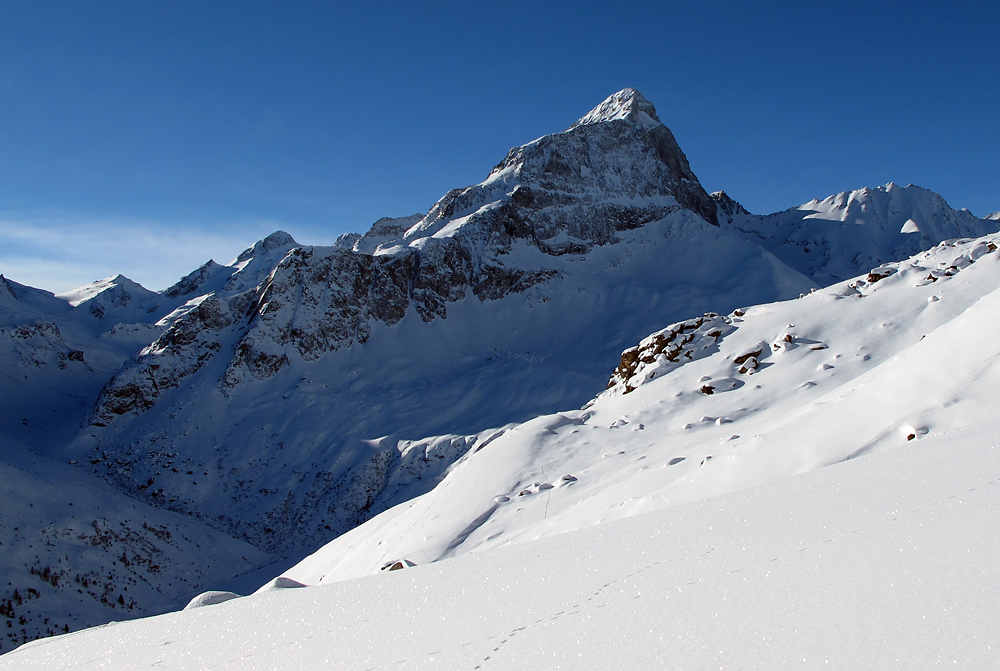
- View from the east side

Highest point
- Elevation: 3,392 m (11,129 ft)
- Prominence: 1,108 m (3,635 ft)
- Parent peak: Piz Kesch
- Isolation: 11.7 km (7.3 mi)
- Listing: Alpine mountains above 3000 m
- Coordinates: 46°29′13.1″N 9°33′42.2″E

Geography
- Location within Switzerland
- Location: Graubünden, Switzerland
- Parent range: Oberhalbstein Alps

Piz Platta is the highest peak in the Oberhalbstein Alps. It is 3392 metres high (Source: Landeskarte der Schweiz no.1256 - 1991), and is notable for its similarity in shape to the Matterhorn. Piz Platta is located between the localities of Avers and Mulegns, both in the Swiss canton of Graubünden.

== See also ==
- List of mountains of Graubünden
- List of most isolated mountains of Switzerland
