= Stausee Solis =

Reservoir in Switzerland

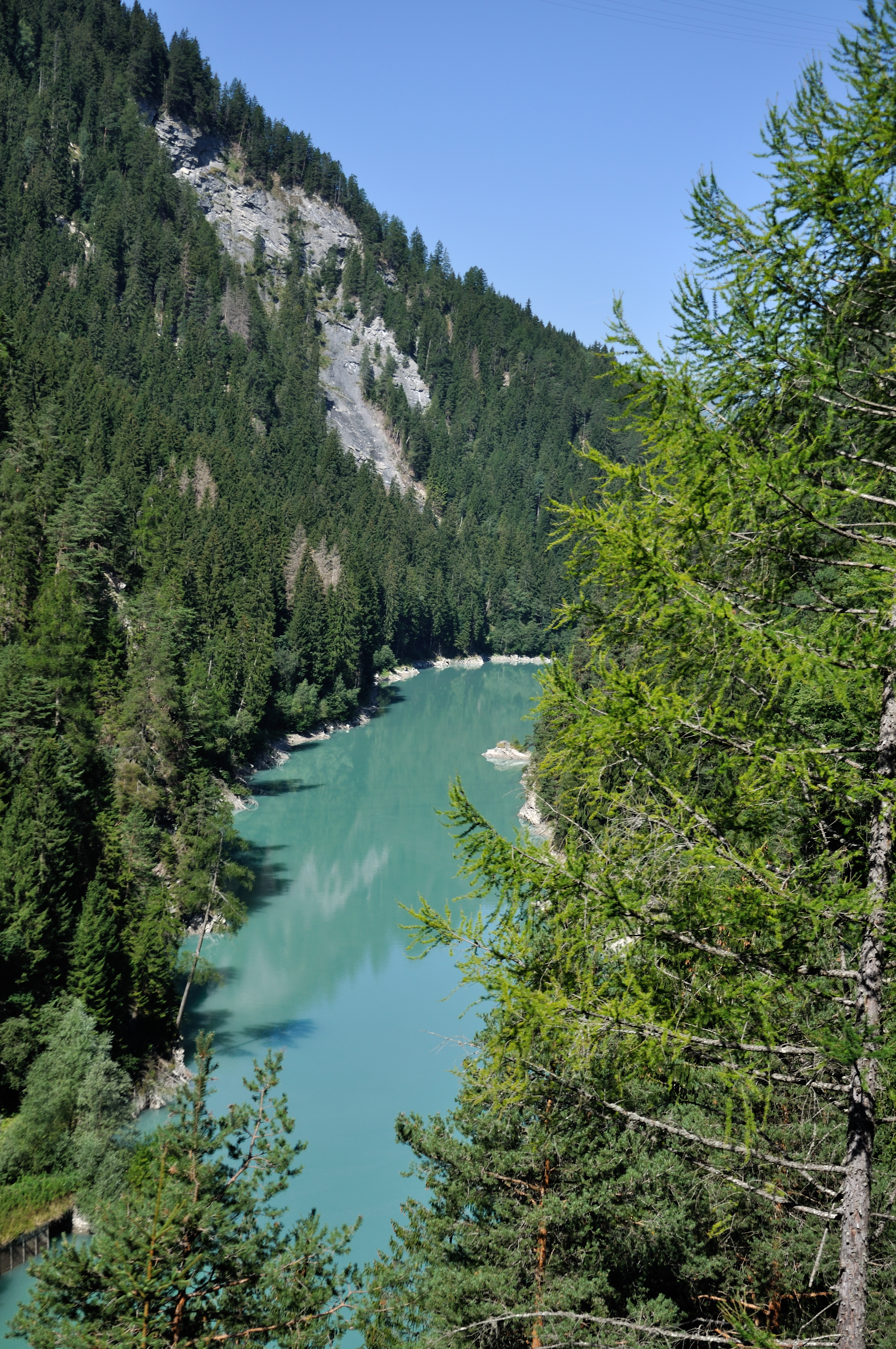
- View from the Rhaetian Railway line

- Location within Canton of Graubünden Location within Switzerland Location within Italy Location within Alps
- Interactive map of Stausee Solis
- Location: Alvaschein/Stierva/Tiefencastel, Graubünden
- Coordinates: 46°40′25″N 9°32′38″E
- Type: reservoir
- Primary inflows: Albula
- Primary outflows: Albula
- Catchment area: 900 km^{2} (350 sq mi)
- Basin countries: Switzerland
- Surface area: 17.75 ha (43.9 acres)
- Water volume: 4.1 million cubic metres (3,300 acre⋅ft) (1986), ~1.5 million cubic metres (1,200 acre⋅ft) Mio m3 (2012)
- Residence time: 0.008 years
- Surface elevation: 824 m (2,703 ft)
- References: Swisstopo

The Stausee Solis ("Solis reservoir") is a reservoir on the Albula river, located between Alvaschein, Stierva and Tiefencastel, in the canton of Graubünden.

== Geography ==
Aerial recording of Stausee Solis

Its surface area is 17.75 ha (43.9 acres). It was built in 1986 by the Electric Power Company of Zurich (ewz). A dam of 61 m (200 ft) height and a crown length of 75 m (246 ft) holds back the water in the lake. The water in the reservoir is used for energy production further downstream in the power plants Sils and Rothenbrunnen. This dam is used as daily storage.

Because of the small size of the lake compared with its catchment area sediment aggregation plays an important role. Around 100,000 m^{3} (3,500,000 cu ft) of sediment settles down every year in the lake, so that by 2012 about 50% of the reservoir volume of 4.1 million cubic metres (3,300 acre⋅ft) was occupied by sediment. In 2012 a sediment bypass tunnel (SBT) was built, which operates only a few days every year, but eliminates sedimentation in the reservoir almost completely. But there are many investigations due to abrasion in the tunnel to make.

The dam is located just east of the Solis Viaduct of the Albula Railway.

== See also ==
- List of mountain lakes of Switzerland
