= Albula/Alvra =

- Municipality
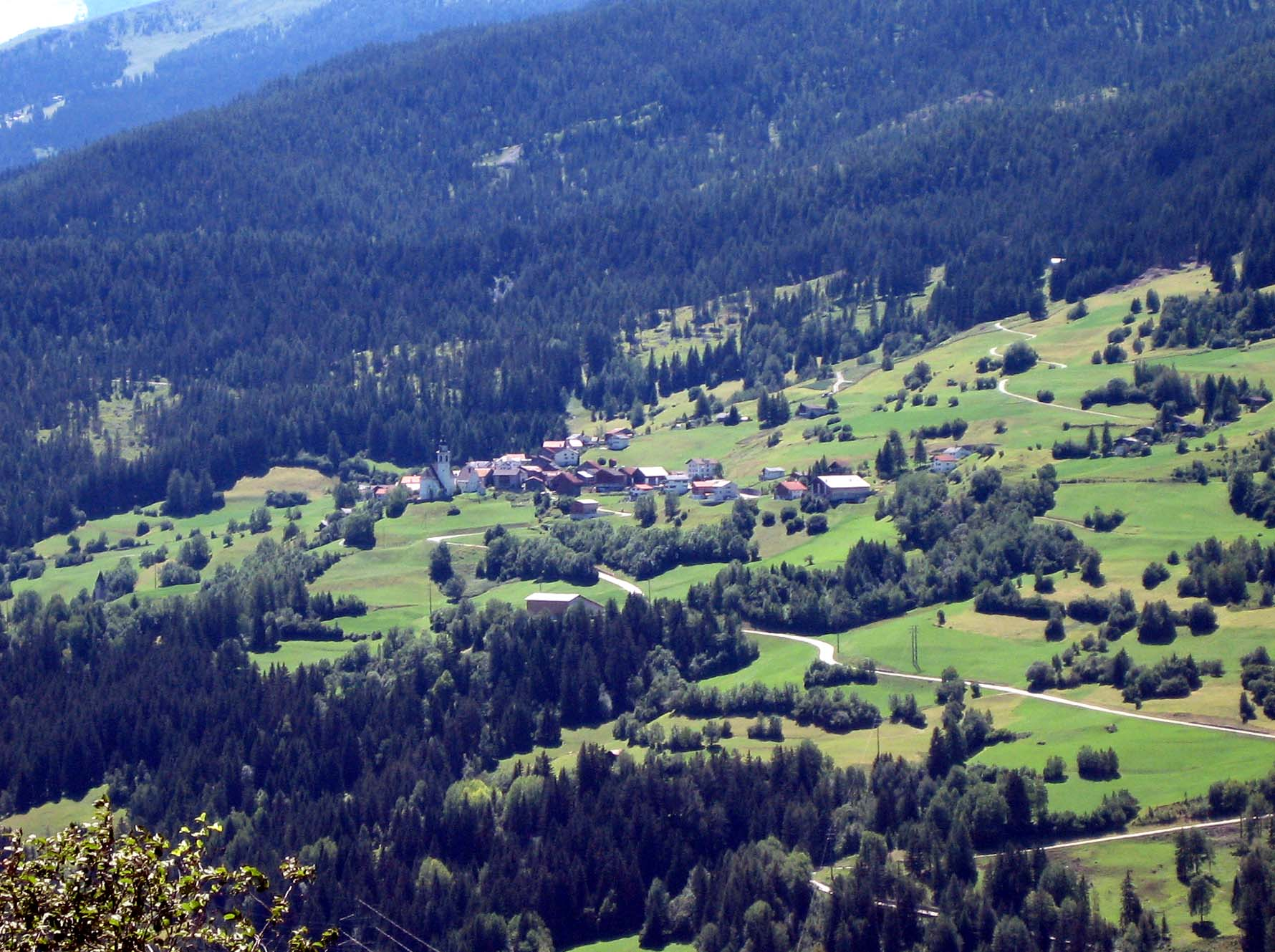
- Mon village from the air

- Flag Coat of arms
- Location of Albula/Alvra
- Location within Switzerland Location within Canton of Grisons
- Coordinates: 46°38′N 9°33′E
- Country: Switzerland
- Canton: Grisons
- District: Albula

Area
  - Total: 93.93 km^{2} (36.27 sq mi)
- Elevation: 1,231 m (4,039 ft)

Population (2013)
  - Total: 1,347
  - Density: 14.34/km^{2} (37.14/sq mi)
- Time zone: UTC+01:00 (CET)
  - Summer (DST): UTC+02:00 (CEST)
- Postal code: 7084,7450,51,58,59,72,92
- SFOS number: 3542
- ISO 3166 code: CH-GR
- Surrounded by: Riom-Parsonz, Salouf
- Website: www.albula-alvra.ch

Albula/Alvra is a municipality in the Albula Region in the canton of the Grisons (Graubünden) in Switzerland. On 1 January 2015, the former municipalities of Alvaschein, Mon, Stierva, Tiefencastel, Alvaneu, Brienz/Brinzauls, and Surava merged to form the new municipality of Albula/Alvra.

== History ==
=== Alvaschein ===
The first mention of the municipality came in 1154, on the occasion of the construction of nunnery named Alvasinis. It became subordinate to the Princes-Bishop of Chur in 1282. In 1367, it belonged to the municipality of Gotteshausband. The inhabitants finally bought their freedom from the Princes-Bishop in 1732. Nearly the whole community was destroyed in a fire in 1745. It has been the seat of the district of the same name since 1851.

=== Mon ===
Mon is first mentioned around 1001-1200 as de Maune. In 1281, it was mentioned as Mans. Until 1943, Mon was known as Mons.

=== Stierva ===
Stierva is first mentioned in 841 Seturiuo. Until 1943, Stierva was known as Stürvis.

=== Tiefencastel ===
Tiefencastel is first mentioned in 831 as in Castello Impitinis. Starting around in the 14th century, it was known as Tüffenkasten.

=== Alvaneu ===
Alvaneu is first mentioned in 1244 as Aluenude. In 1530, it was mentioned as Allweneü. On 20 March 2007, Peter Martin Wettler, a media expert and resident of Zurich was appointed Prince of Belfort by the village's authorities. He was to serve for one year with a mandate to improve tourism and the local economy.

=== Brienz/Brinzauls ===
Brienz/Brinzauls is first mentioned around 840 as Brienzola.

By the 12th century, the village was an economic center for the Bishop of Chur. The Lords of Brienz were first mentioned as the owners of a fortified tower in the village in 1259. In 1526, it separated from the parish of Lantsch/Lenz to become a parish. In 1725, Surava separated from Brienz/Brinzauls to form its own parish. Until 1851, the village was part of the Herrschaft of Belfort. Between 1869 and 1883, Brienz/Brinzauls and Surava were united into a single political municipality.

==== Glacier melt and landslide concerns ====
On 9 May 2023, all residents were ordered to evacuate the village due to the determination by geologists that 2,000,000 cubic metres (71,000,000 cu ft) of rock from the mountain above was expected to collapse into the valley that includes the village. At that time, the population of the village was less than 100 residents. The entire village sits upon a layer of saturated soft-rock permeated by glacial melt from the mountains above. The growth of and consequential increase in pressure on the water deposit below has led the 150-meter thick layer above to slide southwards at a rate of roughly 1.5 meters annually. This has frequently caused damage to and the destruction of infrastructure in the region. Areas at higher elevations on the mountain to the north are moving at a far faster rate of 3 to 10 meters per year. Landslides and falling rocks are thus a frequent hazard for residents and the Albula rail line, which services the village; it is estimated that nearly 10 billion cubic meters of rock are moving in its direction.

A researcher at the University of Cambridge attributed the impending collapse, expected within a week to 24 days, to climate change that is driving glacier melt in the Alps. Simon Löw, emeritus professor of Engineering Geology at ETH Zurich, disputed a link to climate change, citing the lack of thawing permafrost and any correlation between annual rainfall and the speed at which the slope slides. On the night of 15 and 16 June, a major rockfall occurred, stopping short of the village. Municipal officials ended the evacuation of the village on 3 July, while emphasizing that future evacuations could remain necessary.

In 2024, the movement of an additional 1.2 million cubic meters of rock was detected. It was thought that the relatively slow movement of the rock mass could give villagers additional time, in the range of several months, but a sudden collapse, like that of 2023, was not ruled out; such an event would give no time for the inhabitants of the village to flee. Efforts were made in 2024 to reduce pressure on the deposit prior to its eventual collapse. Civil engineers sought to drain the meltwater deposit by tunneling underneath both layers and the mountain above. On November 9, 2024, it was announced that there was a serious fear of the collapse of about 5 million cubic meters of land, and an urgent need for an emergency evacuation of the village. A new evacuation for the village's 91 residents, as well as their pets and livestock, was ordered to be carried out by November 17 at the latest. Personal belongings and the retable of the village's 500 year old church were transported out of the village as well. Since then, access to the village and its immediate environs has been prohibited, and it has been classified as a "red zone" by cantonal authorities.

In December 2024, government and cantonal officials from Grisons announced that they were prepared to offer 90% of the financing necessary to relocate the village's population. Although the 2023 evacuation lasted only 51 days, this one is expected to last far longer, and may possibly be permanent. Even if, in the future, the village is deemed safe for public access, funds will be available for those who do not feel comfortable in their return.

=== Surava ===
Surava is first mentioned about 1580 as Surraguas.

== Geography ==
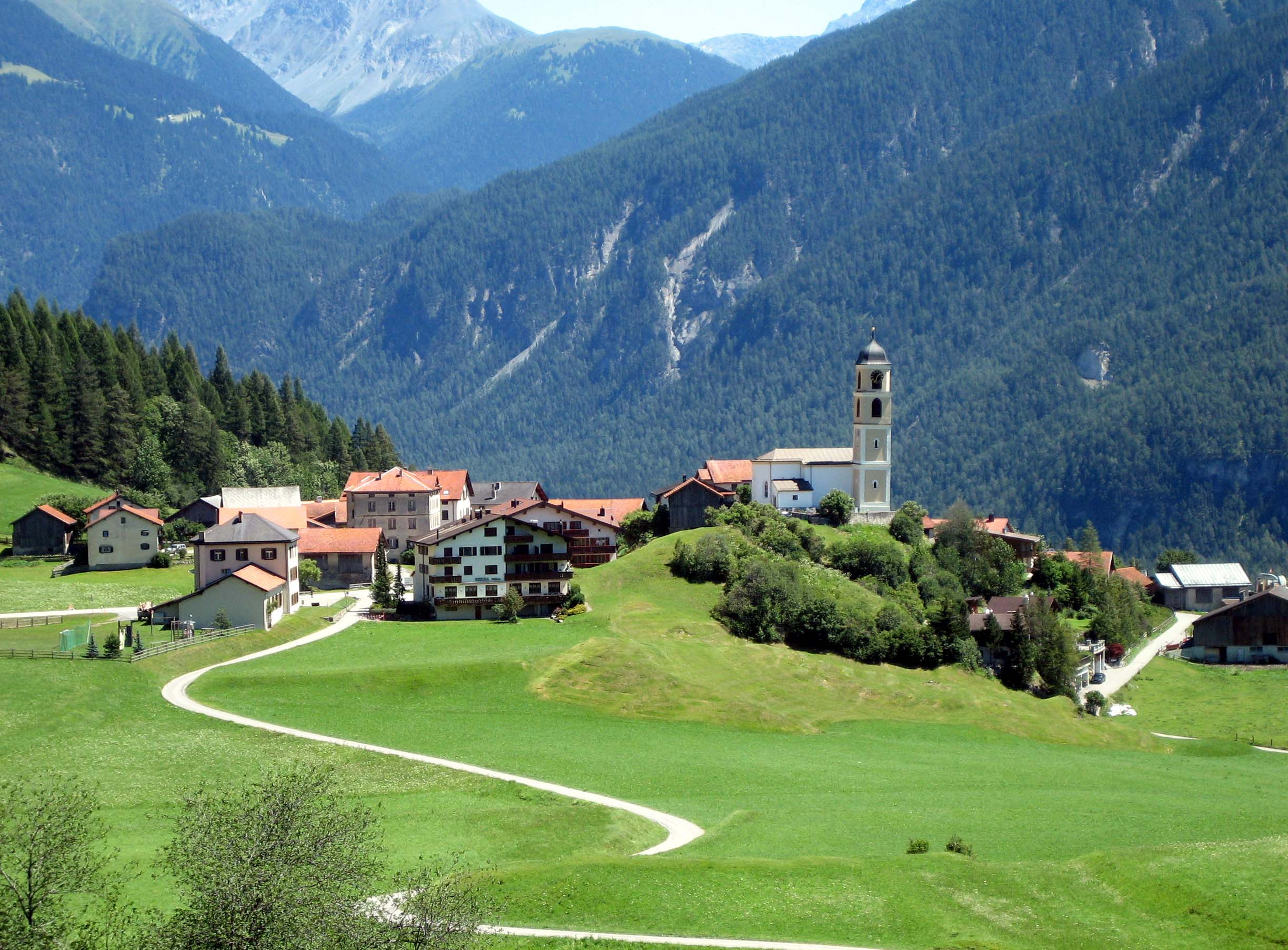
Brienz/Brinzauls village and surrounding mountains

Based on the 2009 survey, the former municipalities that make up Albula/Alvra had an area of 93.93 km^{2} (36.27 sq mi). Of this area, 26.37 km^{2} (10.18 mi^{2}) or 28.1% was used for agricultural purposes, while 43.53 km^{2} (16.81 mi^{2}) or 46.3% was forested. Of the rest of the land, 2.62 km^{2} (1.01 mi^{2}) or 2.8% was settled (buildings or roads), 0.99 km^{2} (0.38 mi^{2}) or 1.1% was either rivers or lakes and 20.46 km^{2} (7.90 mi^{2}) or 21.8% was unproductive land.

Of the built up area, housing and buildings made up 0.9% and transportation infrastructure made up 1.3%. Out of the forested land, 41.3% of the total land area is heavily forested and 2.1% is covered with orchards or small clusters of trees. Of the agricultural land, 1.0% is used for growing crops and 8.6% is pastures and 18.5% is used for alpine pastures. Of the water in the municipality, 0.2% is in lakes and 0.8% is in rivers and streams. Of the unproductive areas, 6.4% is unproductive vegetation and 15.4% is too rocky for vegetation.

== Demographics ==
The total population of Albula/Alvra (as of December 2020) is 1,295.

== Historic population ==
The historical population is given in the following chart:

== Climate ==
Tiefencastel has an average of 98.6 days of rain per year and on average receives 784 mm (30.9 in) of precipitation. The wettest month is August during which time Tiefencastel receives an average of 110 mm (4.3 in) of precipitation. During this month there is precipitation for an average of 10.8 days. The month with the most days of precipitation is June, with an average of 11.3, but with only 92 mm (3.6 in) of precipitation. The driest month of the year is February with an average of 35 mm (1.4 in) of precipitation over 10.8 days.

== Heritage sites of national significance ==
Parts of the UNESCO World Heritage Site, the Rhaetian Railway in the Albula / Bernina Landscapes run through the municipality. The Carolingian-era church of St. Peter Mistail in Alvaschein, the baroque Church of St. Franziskus/S. Francestg in Mon and the parish church of St. Stefan/S. Stefan in Tiefencastel are listed as Swiss heritage sites of national significance. The village of Alvaschein is part of the Inventory of Swiss Heritage Sites.

The Capuchin built church of St. Franziskus/S. Francestg dates from 1643 to 1648. The frescoes were finished by Johann Rudolf Sturn, but in 1915 were partially painted over. However, following the renovation in 1975, the original frescoes are once again visible.

The church of St. Stefan/S. Stefan was first mentioned in 1343. In 1650 it was rebuilt and expanded by the Capuchin monks. During this renovation it was given extensive wood carvings and paintings.

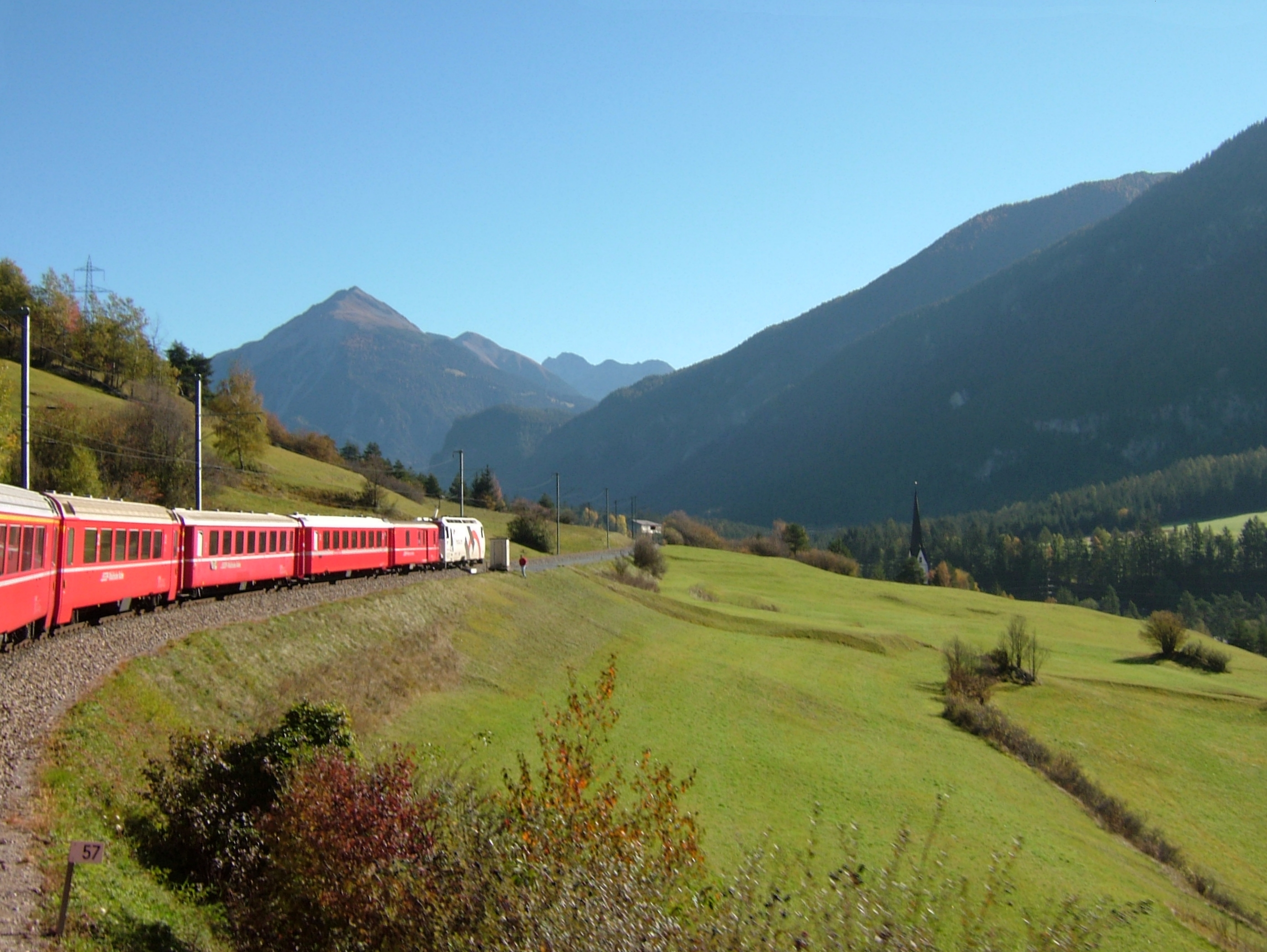
UNESCO World Heritage Site Rhaetian Railway in the Albula / Bernina Landscapes

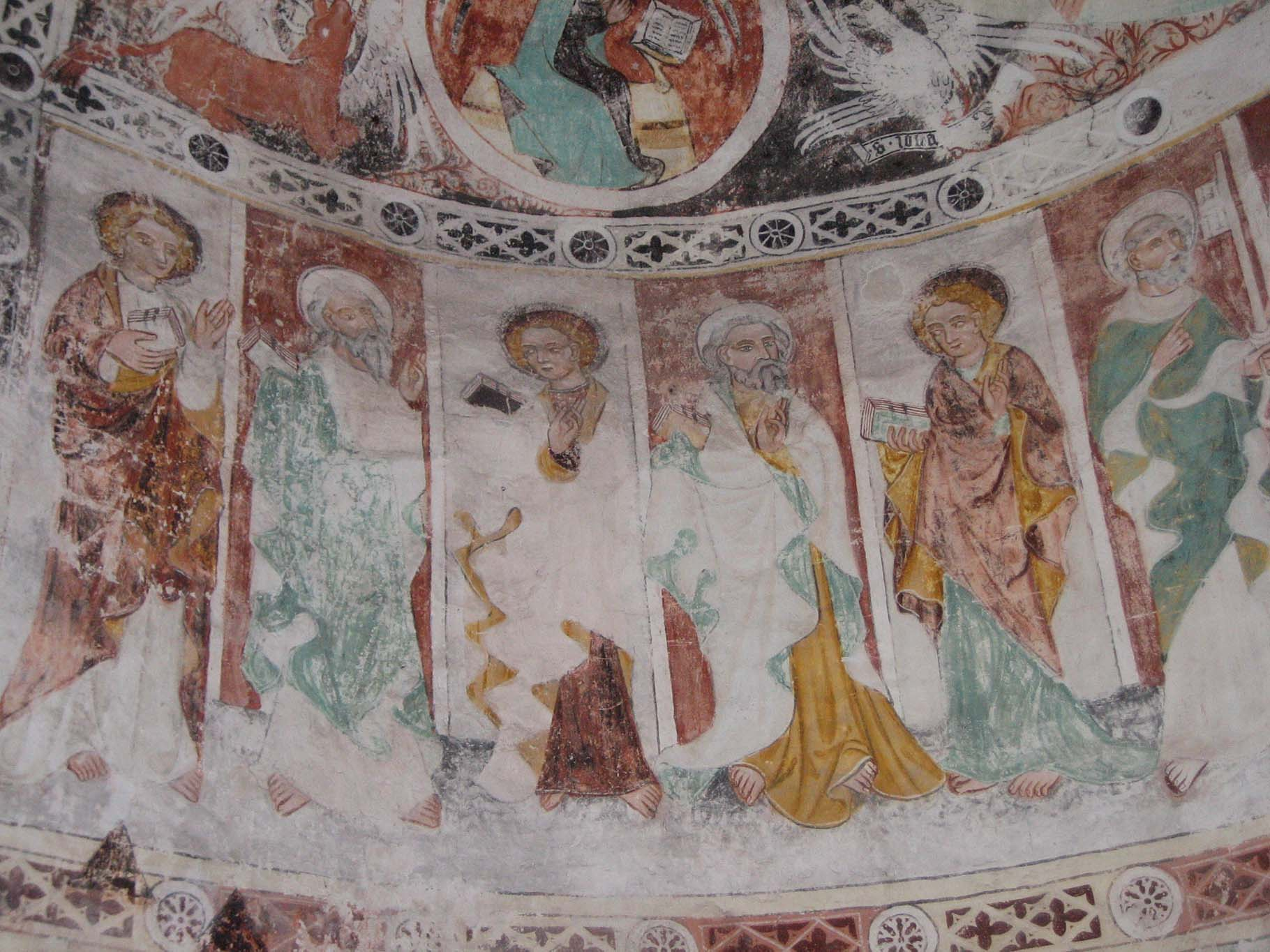
Church of S. Peder E Conturn or St. Peter Mistail in Alvaschein

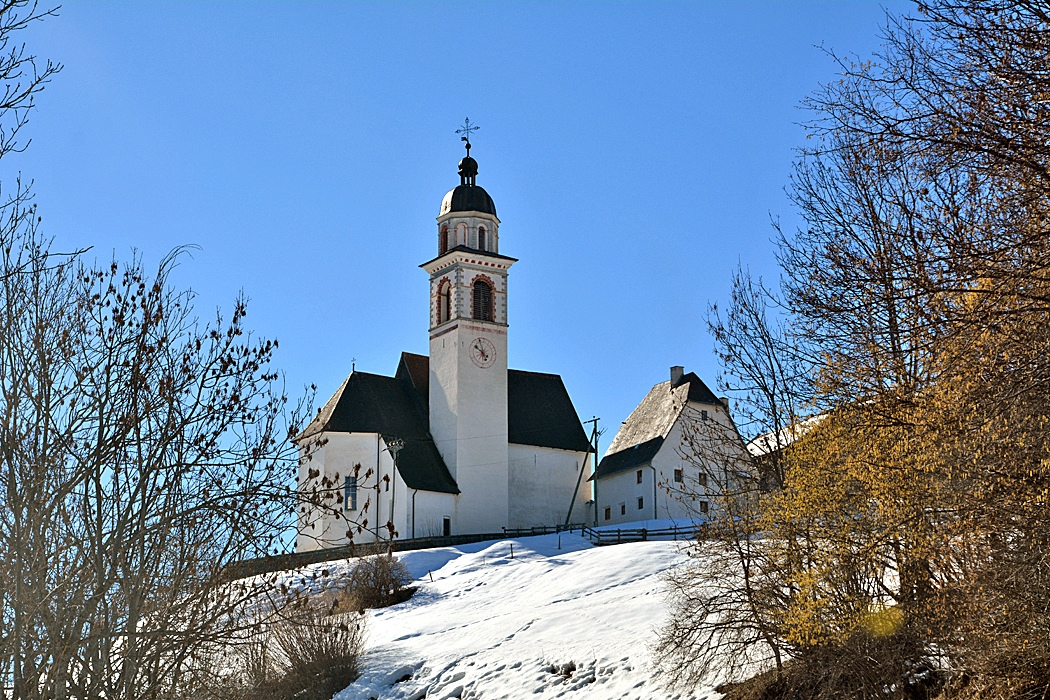
Church of St. Franziskus/S. Francestg in Mon

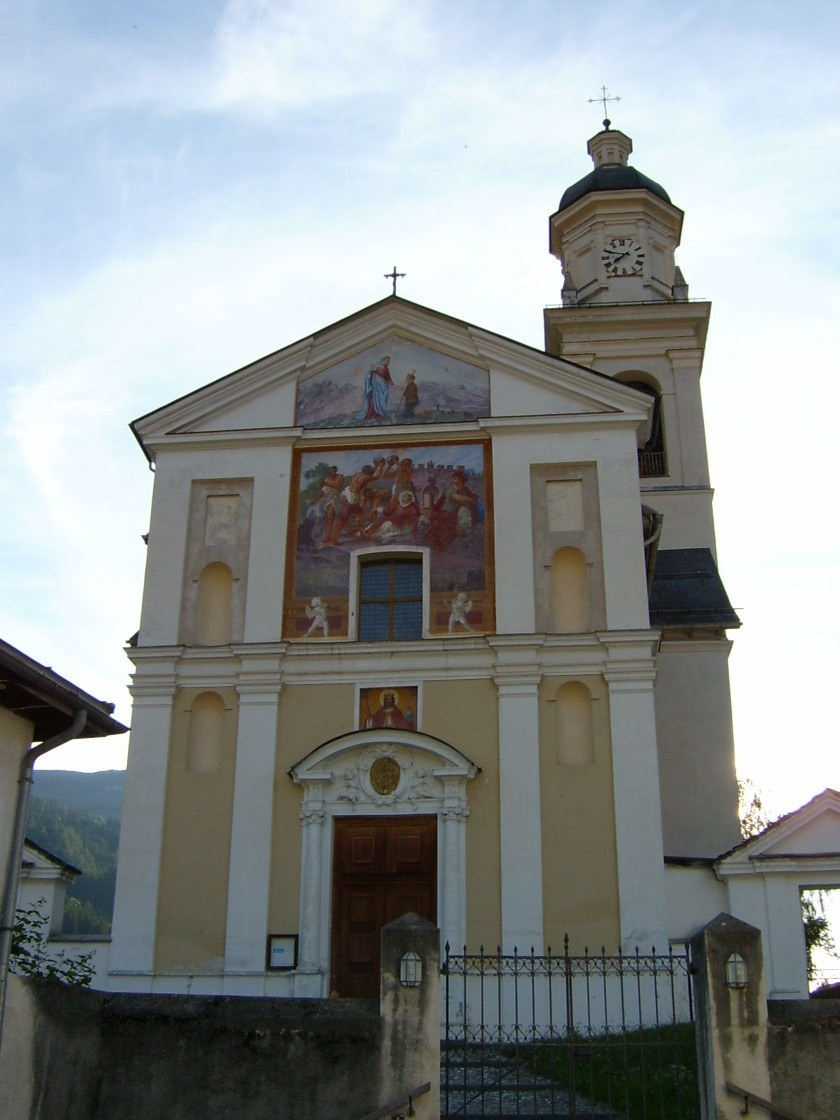
Parish church of St. Stefan/S. Stefan in Tiefencastel
