= Alvaneu =

- Former municipality
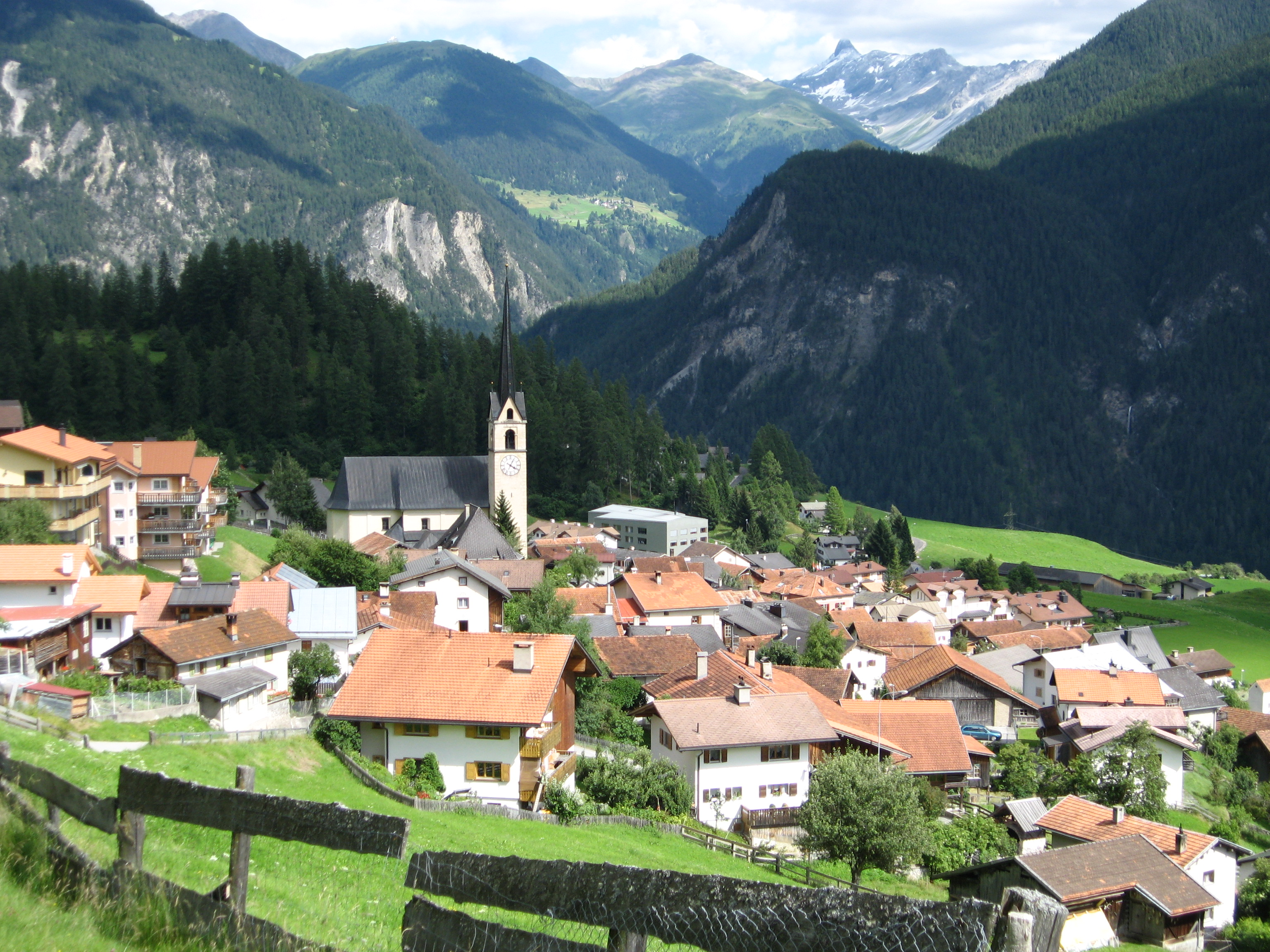

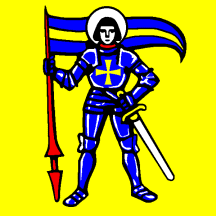
- Flag Coat of arms
- Location of Alvaneu
- Location within Switzerland Location within Canton of Graubünden
- Coordinates: 46°41′N 9°39′E
- Country: Switzerland
- Canton: Graubünden
- District: Albula

Government
  - Mayor: Thomas Kollegger

Area
  - Total: 35.63 km^{2} (13.76 sq mi)
- Elevation: 1,181 m (3,875 ft)

Population (Dec 2013)
  - Total: 403
  - Density: 11.3/km^{2} (29.3/sq mi)
- Time zone: UTC+01:00 (CET)
  - Summer (DST): UTC+02:00 (CEST)
- Postal code: 7492
- SFOS number: 3511
- ISO 3166 code: CH-GR
- Surrounded by: Arosa, Brienz/Brinzauls, Filisur, Lantsch/Lenz, Schmitten, Surava, Tiefencastel
- Website: www.albula-alvra.ch

Alvaneu (Romansh: Alvagni) is a village and former municipality in the district of Albula in the canton of Graubünden in Switzerland. On 1 January 2015 the former municipalities of Alvaschein, Mon, Stierva, Tiefencastel, Alvaneu, Brienz/Brinzauls and Surava merged to form the new municipality of Albula/Alvra.

On 20 March 2007 Peter Martin Wettler, a media expert and resident of Zurich was appointed Prince of Belfort by the village's authorities.

== History ==
Alvaneu is first mentioned in 1244 as Aluenude. In 1530 it was mentioned as Allweneü.

== Geography ==
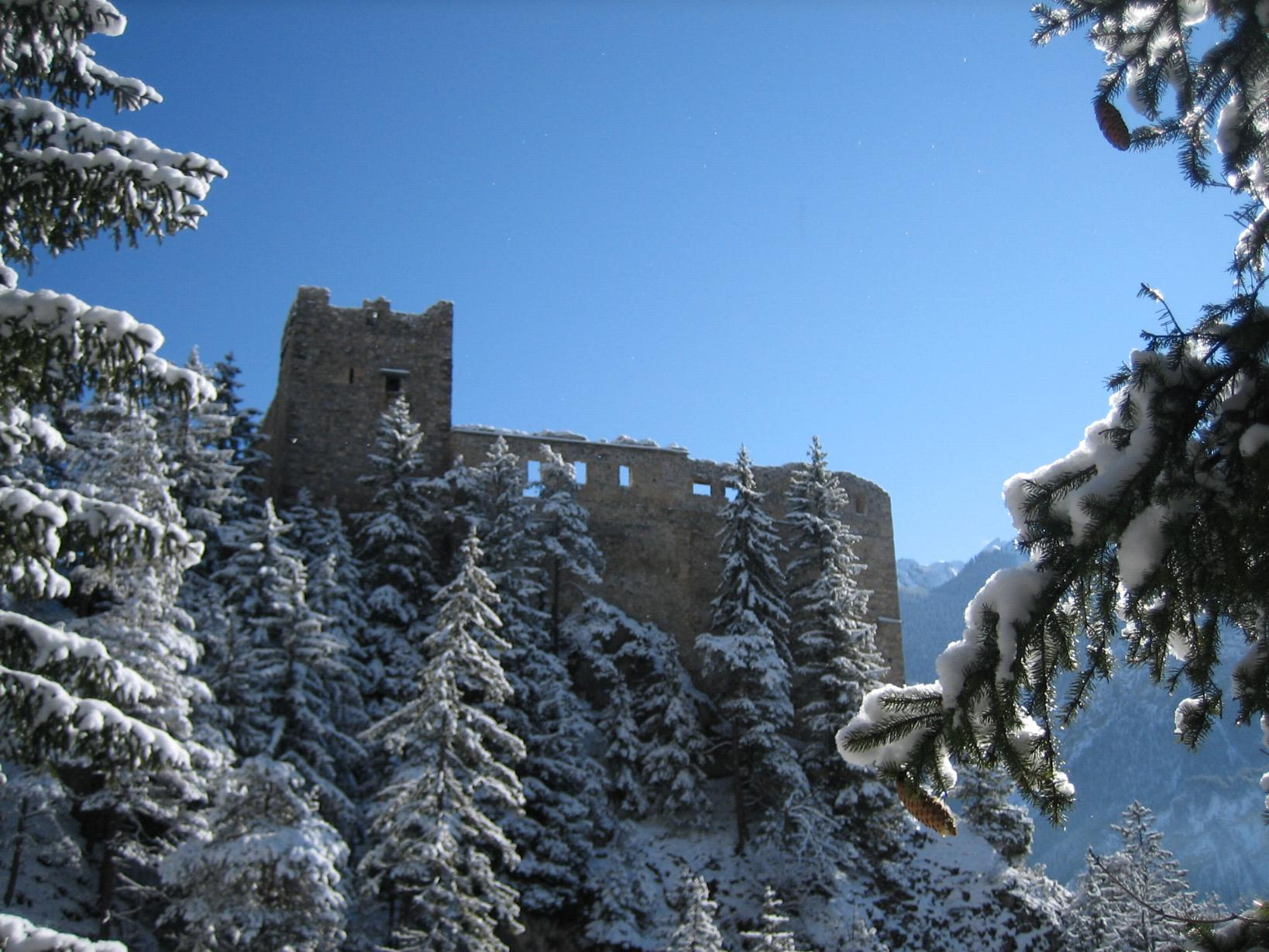
Belfort castle ruins near Alvaneu

Aerial view from 2300 m by Walter Mittelholzer (1925)

Before the merger, Alvaneu had a total area of 35.7 km^{2} (13.8 mi^{2}). Of this area, 27% is used for agricultural purposes, while 32.8% is forested. Of the rest of the land, 2% is settled (buildings or roads) and the remainder (38.2%) is non-productive (rivers, glaciers or mountains).

The former municipality is located in the Belfort sub-district of the Albula district. It is located on a terrace above the Albula river. It consists of the village of Alvaneu (Alvaneu-Dorf) and Alvaneu-Bad on the valley floor. The municipality also included the settlement of Aclas d'Alvagni as well as the alpine settlements of Creusch and Ramoz.

== Demographics ==
Alvaneu had a population (as of 2013) of 403. As of 2007, 7.6% of the population was made up of foreign nationals. Over the last 10 years the population has decreased at a rate of -6.2%.

In the 2007 federal election the most popular party was the SVP which received 42% of the vote. The next three most popular parties were the CVP (25.1%), the SPS (22.8%) and the FDP (7.9%).

In Alvaneu about 69.7% of the population (between age 25-64) have completed either non-mandatory upper secondary education or additional higher education (either university or a Fachhochschule).

Alvaneu has an unemployment rate of 0.27%. As of 2005, there were 43 people employed in the primary economic sector and about 16 businesses involved in this sector. 37 people are employed in the secondary sector and there are 4 businesses in this sector. 124 people are employed in the tertiary sector, with 23 businesses in this sector.

The historical population is given in the following table:

year	population
1838	362
1850	354
1880	314
1900	382
1930	441
1950	475
1960	396
1970	421
1980	379
1990	380
2000	407

== Languages ==
The traditional language of the population until the middle of the 19th century was Romansh. However, in 1880, only 80.1% of the inhabitants spoke Romansch as their native language. This erosion continued (1910: 68.06%, 1941: 56.0%, 1970: 47.03%). 1960 was the last census that counted a Romansch-speaking majority.

Languages in Alvaneu
Language	Census of 1980		Census of 1990		Census of 2000	
Language	Number	Percentage	Number	Percentage	Number	Percentage
German	189	49.87%	230	60.53%	308	76.43%
Romansh	157	41.42%	109	28.68%	68	16.87%
Italian	30	7.92%	28	7.37%	14	3.47%
Population	379	100%	380	100%	403	100%

Although 31% still speak some Romansch, German is now the only official language for municipality business.

Most of the population (as of 2000) speaks German (76.4%), with Rhaeto-Romance being second most common (16.9%) and Italian being third ( 3.5%).
