= Alvaschein =

- Former municipality
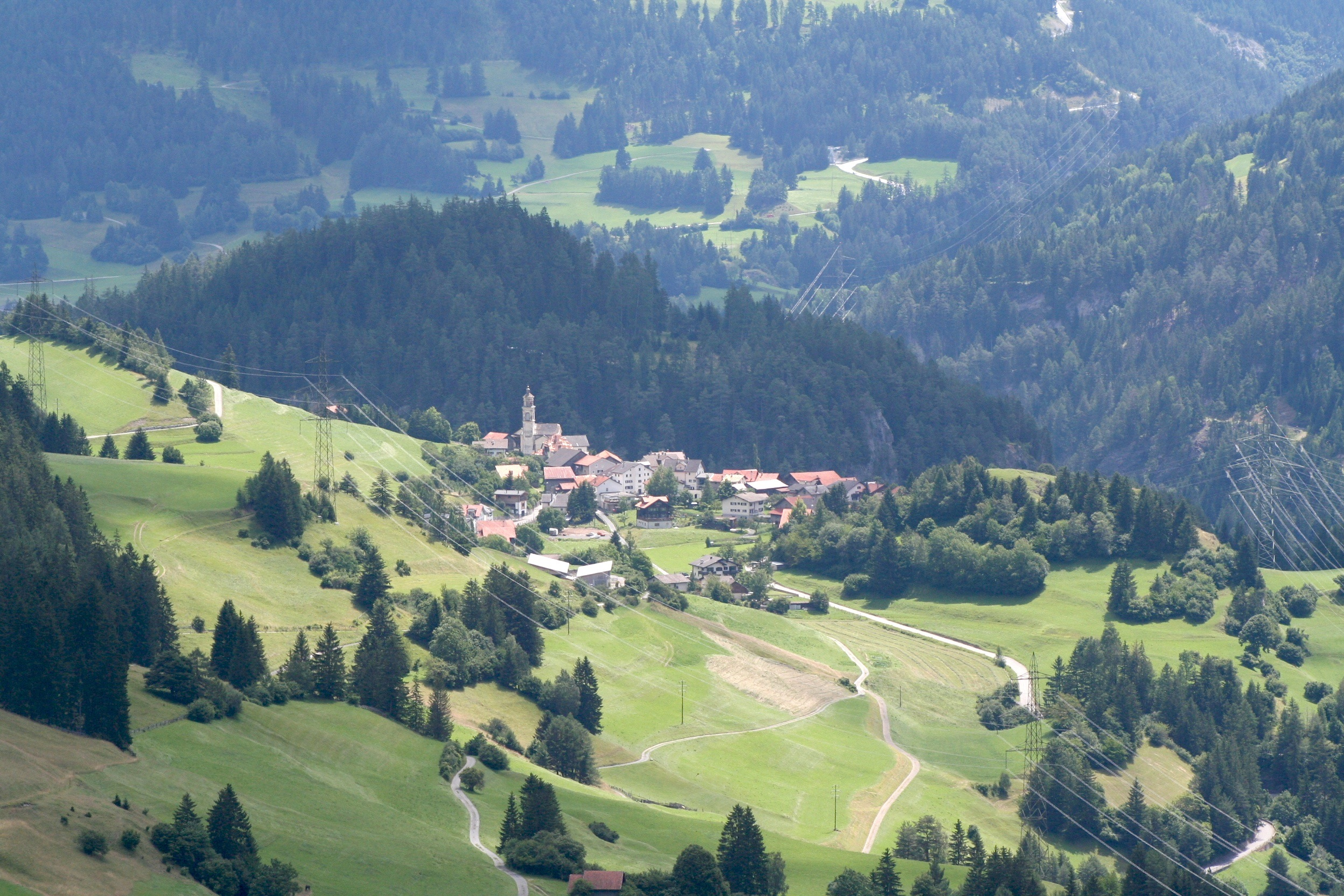

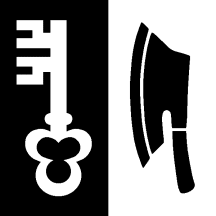
- Flag Coat of arms
- Location of Alvaschein
- Location within Switzerland Location within Canton of Graubünden
- Coordinates: 46°40′N 9°33′E
- Country: Switzerland
- Canton: Graubünden
- District: Albula

Government
  - Mayor: Hans Peter Salzburger

Area
  - Total: 4.06 km^{2} (1.57 sq mi)
- Elevation: 1,001 m (3,284 ft)

Population (Dec 2013)
  - Total: 142
  - Density: 35.0/km^{2} (90.6/sq mi)
- Time zone: UTC+01:00 (CET)
  - Summer (DST): UTC+02:00 (CEST)
- Postal code: 7451
- SFOS number: 3501
- ISO 3166 code: CH-GR
- Surrounded by: Brienz/Brinzauls, Lantsch/Lenz, Stierva, Tiefencastel, Vaz/Obervaz
- Website: www.albula-alvra.ch

Alvaschein (Romansh: Alvaschagn) is a village and former municipality in the district of Albula in the canton of Graubünden in Switzerland. On 1 January 2015 the former municipalities of Alvaschein, Mon, Stierva, Tiefencastel, Alvaneu, Brienz/Brinzauls and Surava merged to form the new municipality of Albula/Alvra.

== Coat of arms ==
Description: divided between black and silver (white); a broken silver key on the black ground, and a black carpenter's axe on the silver ground. The key and axe are references to the church patrons: St. Peter in Mistail and St. Joseph in Alvaschein.

== Geography ==
Aerial view from 2500 m by Walter Mittelholzer (1928)

Before the merger, Alvaschein had a total area of 4.1 km^{2} (1.6 mi^{2}). Of this area, 31.3% is used for agricultural purposes, while 58.1% is forested. Of the rest of the land, 7.4% is settled (buildings or roads) and the remainder (3.2%) is non-productive (rivers, glaciers or mountains).

The municipality is located in the Alvaschein sub-district of the Albula District. It is located along the route to the Julier and Albula Passes on a terrace which is north-east of the Albula river and the Stausee Solis reservoir.

== Neighboring municipalities ==
Alvaschein borders on Brienz/Brinzauls, Lantsch/Lenz, Stierva, Tiefencastel, and Vaz/Obervaz.

== Population ==
=== Population growth ===
The population was relatively stable in the second half of the 19th century (lowest value: 137; highest value: 156). The all-time high came in 1900, when the population reached 276. However, many of these were laborers working on the Abula train line. For the same reason (construction) the population was above average in 1970. Between 1900 and 1930 the population rose slightly, remained stable for two decades, and then fell in the 1980s. Since then the population has oscillated about 150. Alvaschein had a population (as of 2013) of 142. As of 2007, 4.1% of the population was made up of foreign nationals. Over the last 10 years the population has decreased at a rate of -17.1%.

Population Growth
Year	Population
1850	156
1860	137
1888	144
1900	276
1910	165
1930	208
1950	208
1970	235
1980	149
2004	149

=== Languages ===
The original majority language was Romansh; today only a minority still speak it. Most of the population (as of 2000) speaks German (53.2%), with Romansh being second most common (40.3%) and Italian being third ( 3.2%).

Languages in Alvaschein
Language	1980 Census		1990 Census		2000 Census	
Language	Number	Percent	Number	Percent	Number	Percent
German	73	48.99%	64	44.13%	82	53.25%
Romansh	71	47.65%	67	46.21%	62	40.26%
Italian	5	3.36%	2	1.38%	5	3.25%
Population	149	100%	145	100%	154	100%

=== Religion ===
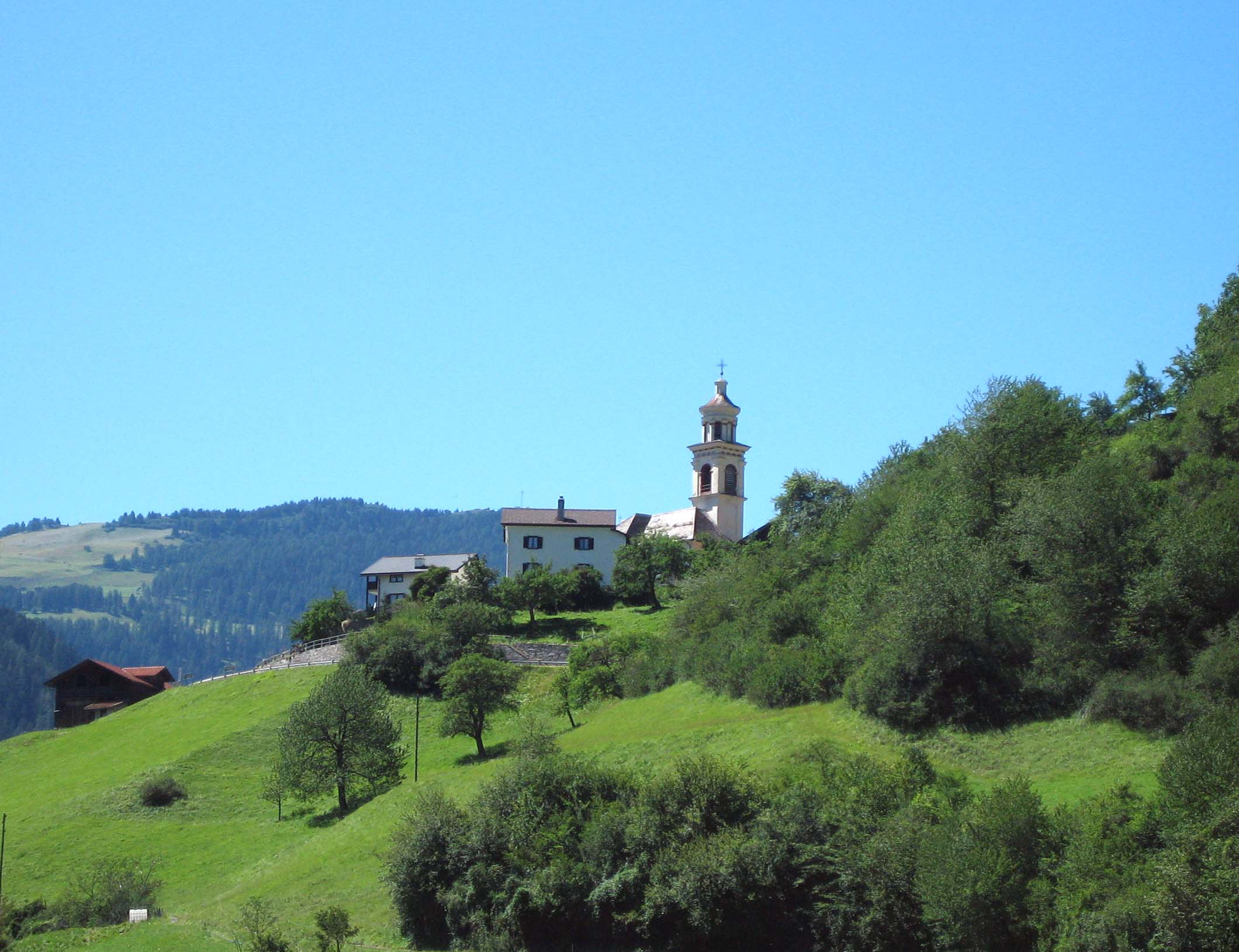
Church of Alvaschein

At the time of the Reformation, the population of Alvaschein belonged to those municipalities in the canton that remained true to the "old teachings." Today (as of 2000) 73.38% are Roman Catholic, 14.94% are Protestant, 1.95% are Orthodox Christians; 2.6% are Muslim, 1.95% are atheist, and 4.55% did not respond.

=== Origin-nationality ===
Of the 149 inhabitants at the end of 2004, 144 (96.64%) were Swiss citizens. At the time of the last census 92.86% were Swiss citizens, of whom eight were dual citizens. The few immigrants come from no less than eight foreign countries, including, most prominently, Germany and Serbia and Montenegro.

== Politics ==
The current Municipal President is Hans Peter Salzburger.

In the 2007 federal election the most popular party was the SVP which received 39.3% of the vote. The next three most popular parties were the CVP (29.4%), the FDP (17.8%) and the SPS (13.6%).

== Education ==
In Alvaschein about 56.1% of the population (between age 25-64) have completed either non-mandatory upper secondary education or additional higher education (either university or a Fachhochschule).

== Economy ==
In 2000/2001 there were 17 work places in Alvaschein, at which 50 people earned their income. By economic sector (# of work places/ # of employees): Agriculture and Forestry (7/17), Industry and Trade (3/20), services (7/13).

Alvaschein has an unemployment rate of 0.35%. As of 2005, there were 14 people employed in the primary economic sector and about 6 businesses involved in this sector. 14 people are employed in the secondary sector and there are 2 businesses in this sector. 21 people are employed in the tertiary sector, with 8 businesses in this sector.

== History ==
The first mention of the municipality came in 1154, on the occasion of the construction of nunnery named Alvasinis. It became subordinate to the Princes-Bishop of Chur in 1282. In 1367 it belonged to the municipality of Gotteshausband. The inhabitants finally bought their freedom from the Princes-Bishop in 1732. Nearly the whole community was destroyed in a fire in 1745. It has been the seat of the district of the same name since 1851.

== Attractions ==
The biggest attraction is the Carolingian-era church of St. Peter Mistail, which is a monument of cultural and historical meaning to Europe and is listed as a Swiss heritage site of national significance. The village church is named St. Joseph and was erected between 1653 and 1657.
