= Surava =

- Former municipality
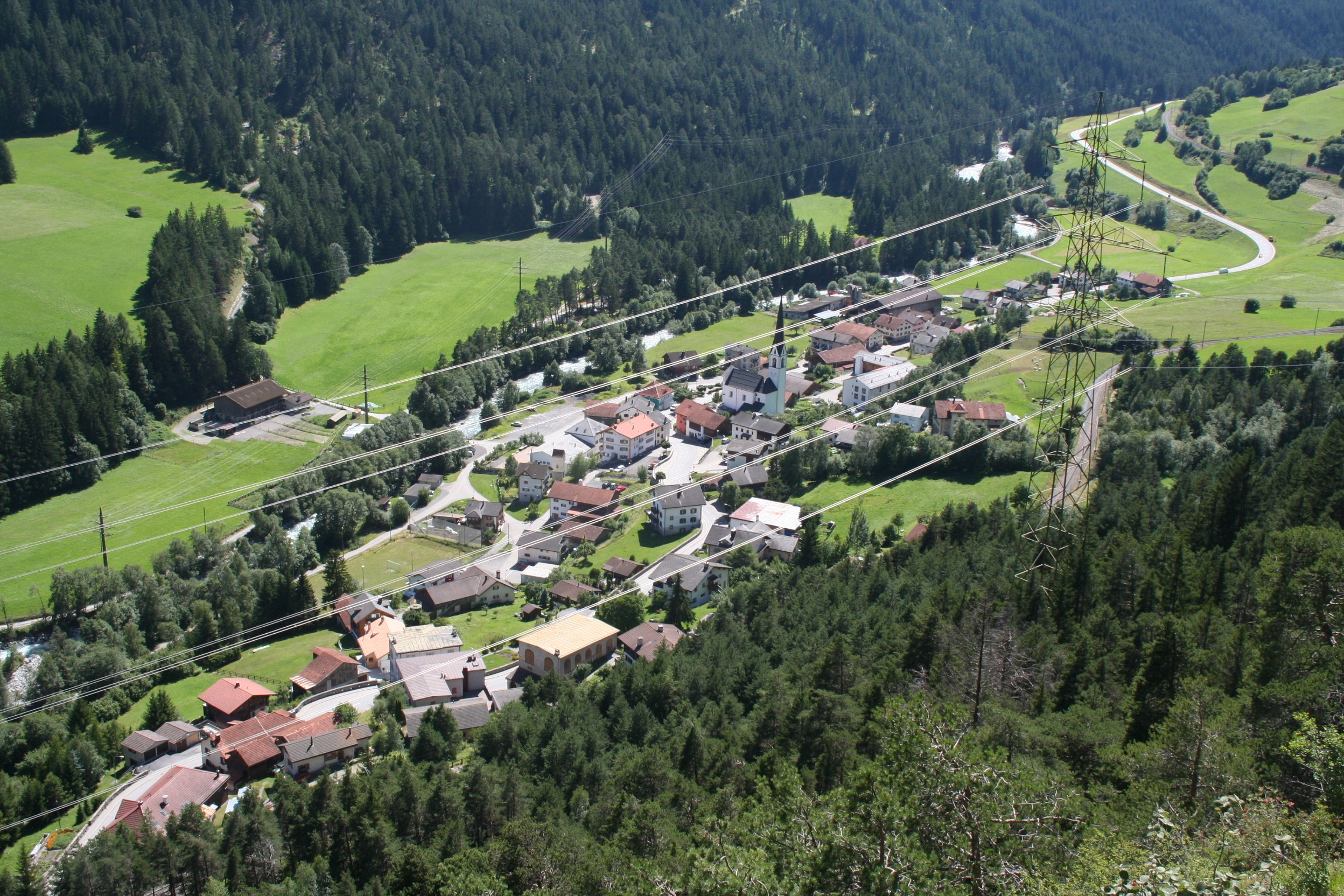

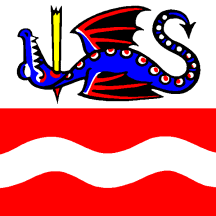
- Flag Coat of arms
- Location of Surava
- Location within Switzerland Location within Canton of Graubünden
- Coordinates: 46°39′N 9°36′E
- Country: Switzerland
- Canton: Graubünden
- District: Albula

Area
  - Total: 7.0 km^{2} (2.7 sq mi)
- Elevation: 904 m (2,966 ft)

Population (Dec 2013)
  - Total: 196
  - Density: 28/km^{2} (73/sq mi)
- Time zone: UTC+01:00 (CET)
  - Summer (DST): UTC+02:00 (CEST)
- Postal code: 7472
- SFOS number: 3515
- ISO 3166 code: CH-GR
- Surrounded by: Alvaneu, Brienz/Brinzauls, Tiefencastel
- Website: www.albula-alvra.ch

Surava is a village and former municipality in the district of Albula in the canton of Graubünden in Switzerland. On 1 January 2015 the former municipalities of Alvaschein, Mon, Stierva, Tiefencastel, Alvaneu, Brienz/Brinzauls and Surava merged to form the new municipality of Albula/Alvra.

== History ==
Surava is first mentioned about 1580 as Surraguas.

== Geography ==
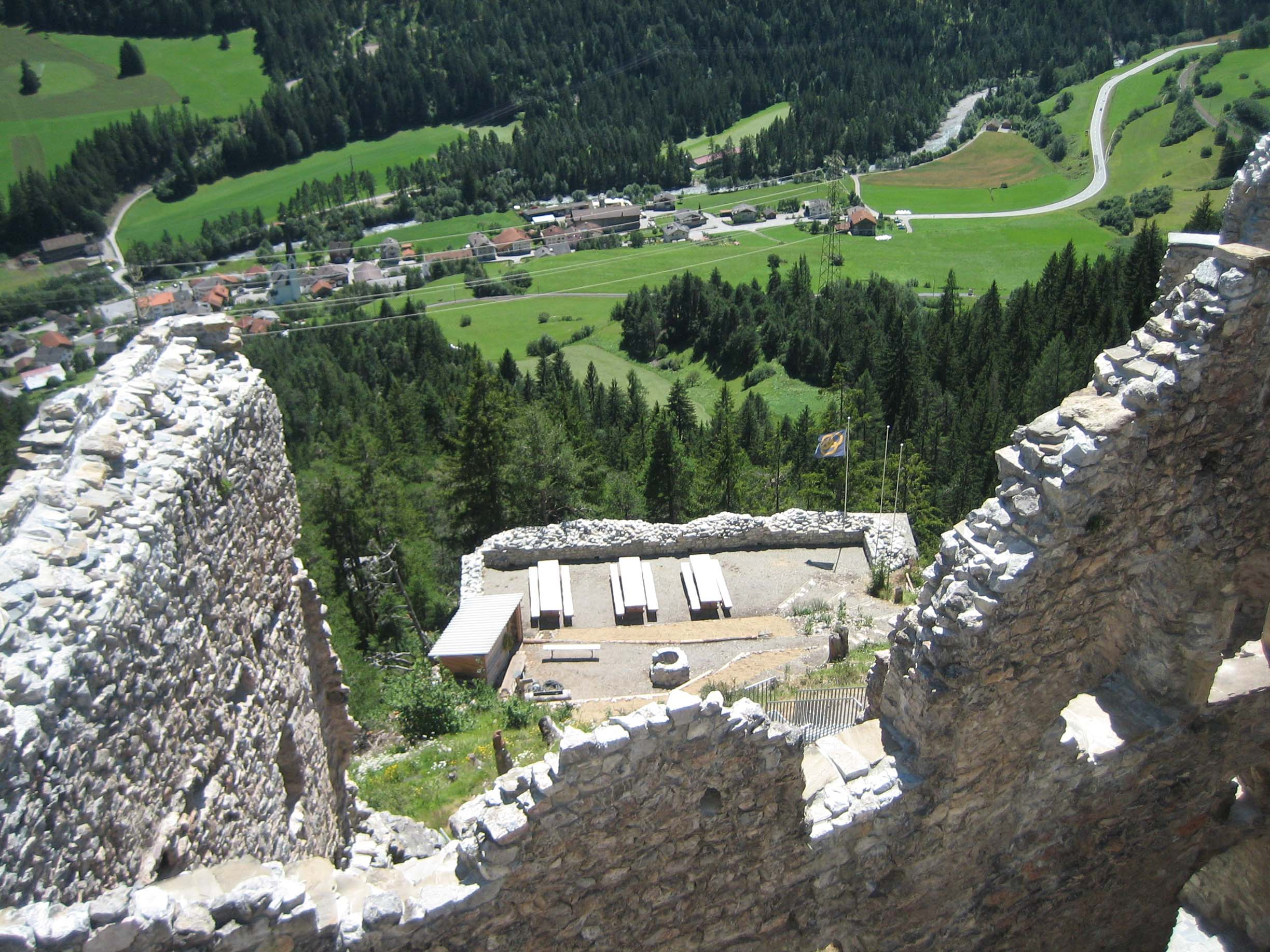
Ruins of Belfort Castle, above Surava

Aerial view (1954)

Before the merger, Surava had a total area of 7.0 km^{2} (2.7 mi^{2}). Of this area, 10.6% is used for agricultural purposes, while 78.3% is forested. Of the rest of the land, 4.3% is settled (buildings or roads) and the remainder (6.8%) is non-productive (rivers, glaciers or mountains).

The former municipality is located in the Belfort sub-district of the Albula District. It consists of the linear village of Surava on the right bank of the Albula river. In 1883 the municipality of Brienz-Surava split into Brienz/Brinzauls and Surava.

== Demographics ==
Surava had a population (as of 2013) of 196. As of 2008, 7.0% of the population was made up of foreign nationals. Over the last 10 years the population has decreased at a rate of -22%.

As of 2000, the gender distribution of the population was 52.8% male and 47.2% female. The age distribution, as of 2000, in Surava is; 9 people or 12.0% of the population are between 0 and 9 years old. 6 people or 8.0% are 10 to 14, and 7 people or 9.3% are 15 to 19. Of the adult population, 4 people or 5.3% of the population are between 20 and 29 years old. 10 people or 13.3% are 30 to 39, 14 people or 18.7% are 40 to 49, and 10 people or 13.3% are 50 to 59. The senior population distribution is 4 people or 5.3% of the population are between 60 and 69 years old, 3 people or 4.0% are 70 to 79, there are 7 people or 9.3% who are 80 to 89, and there are 1 people or 1.3% who are 90 to 99.

In the 2007 federal election the most popular party was the CVP which received 43.7% of the vote. The next three most popular parties were the SVP (32.6%), the FDP (18.6%) and the SPS (5.1%).

In Surava about 66.2% of the population (between age 25-64) have completed either non-mandatory upper secondary education or additional higher education (either university or a Fachhochschule).

Surava has an unemployment rate of 0.67%. As of 2005, there were 8 people employed in the primary economic sector and about 3 businesses involved in this sector. 22 people are employed in the secondary sector and there are 7 businesses in this sector. 35 people are employed in the tertiary sector, with 8 businesses in this sector.

The historical population is given in the following table:

year	population
1725	89
1850	159
1900	148
1950	203
1960	136
1970	93
1980	62
1990	73
2000	150

== Language ==
Most of the population (as of 2000) speaks German (78.4%), with Romansh being second most common (10.8%) and Albanian being third ( 2.8%).

Languages in Surava
Languages	Census 1980		Census 1990		Census 2000	
Languages	Number	Percent	Number	Percent	Number	Percent
German	116	60.42%	161	76.67%	196	78.40%
Romanish	66	34.38%	45	21.43%	27	10.80%
Italian	10	5.21%	2	0.95%	4	1.60%
Population	192	100%	210	100%	250	100%
