= Mon, Switzerland =

Mon
- Former municipality
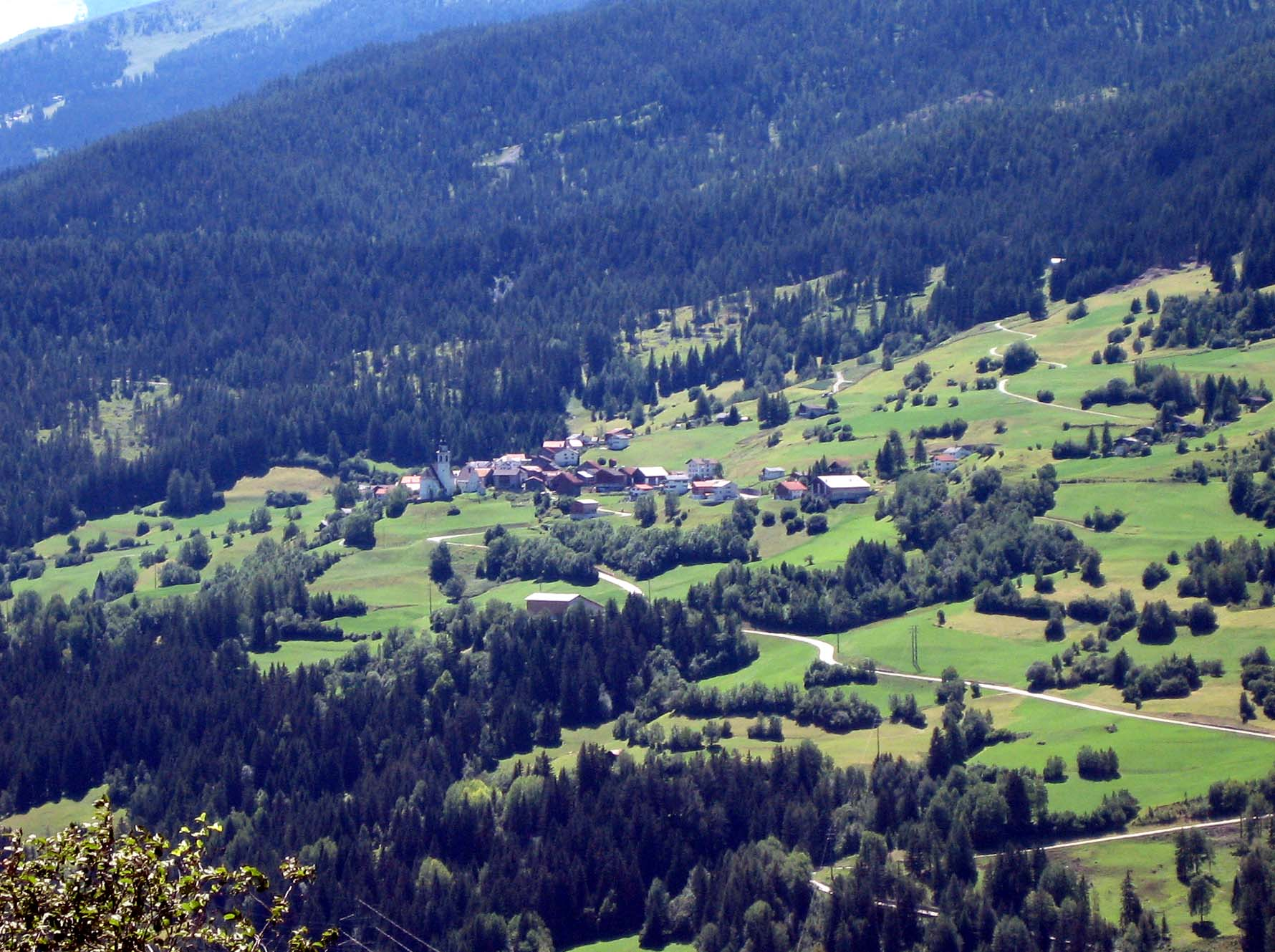
- Mon village from the air

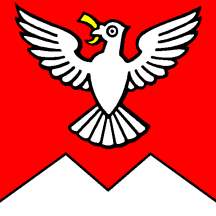
- Flag Coat of arms
- Location of Mon
- Location within Switzerland Location within Canton of Graubünden
- Coordinates: 46°38′N 9°33′E
- Country: Switzerland
- Canton: Graubünden
- District: Albula

Area
  - Total: 8.51 km^{2} (3.29 sq mi)
- Elevation (Church): 1,231 m (4,039 ft)

Population (Dec 2013)
  - Total: 90
  - Density: 11/km^{2} (27/sq mi)
- Time zone: UTC+01:00 (CET)
  - Summer (DST): UTC+02:00 (CEST)
- Postal code: 7458
- SFOS number: 3502
- ISO 3166 code: CH-GR
- Surrounded by: Riom-Parsonz, Salouf, Stierva, Tiefencastel
- Website: www.albula-alvra.ch

Mon is a village and a former municipality in the district of Albula in the canton of Graubünden in Switzerland. On 1 January 2015 the former municipalities of Alvaschein, Mon, Stierva, Tiefencastel, Alvaneu, Brienz/Brinzauls and Surava merged to form the new municipality of Albula/Alvra.

== History ==
Mon is first mentioned around 1001-1200 as de Maune. In 1281 it was mentioned as Mans. Until 1943 Mon was known as Mons.

== Geography ==
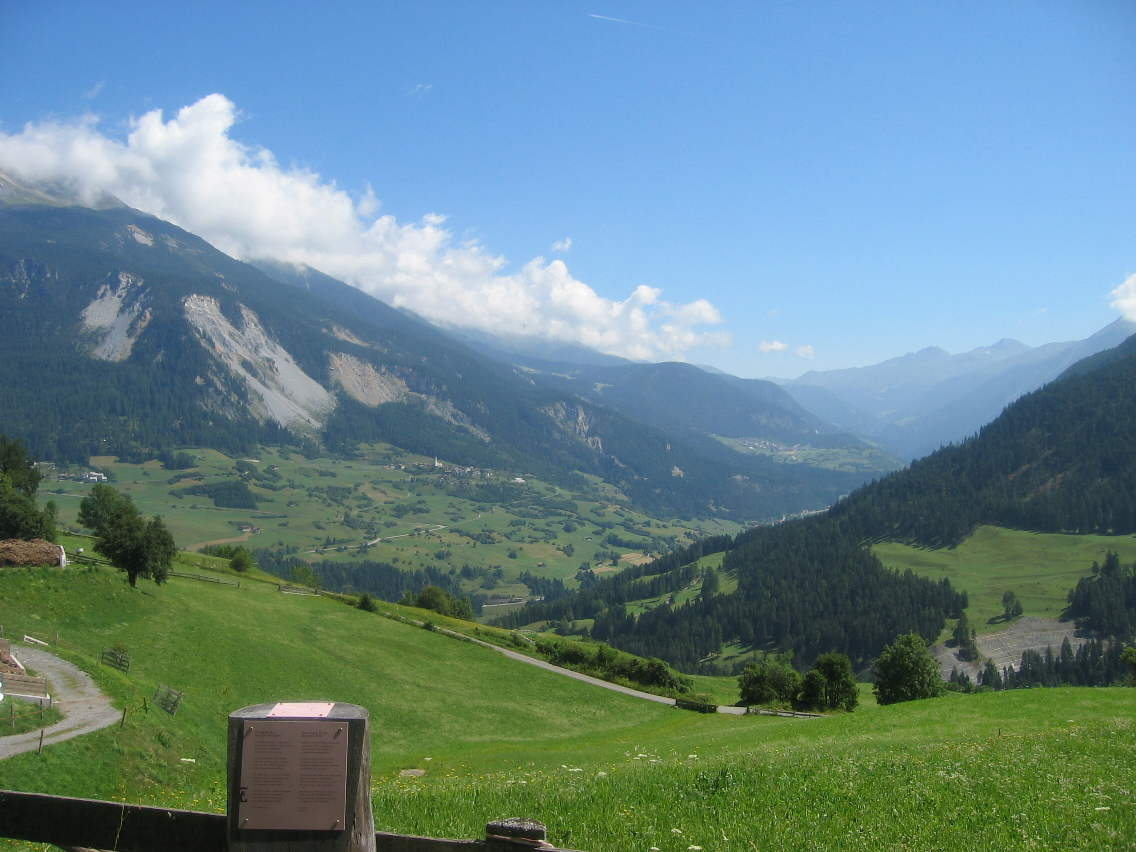
Albula valley near Mon

Before the merger, Mon had a total area of 8.5 km^{2} (3.3 mi^{2}). Of this area, 36.7% is used for agricultural purposes, while 58.8% is forested. Of the rest of the land, 1.9% is settled (buildings or roads) and the remainder (2.7%) is non-productive (rivers, glaciers or mountains).

The municipality is located in the Alvaschein sub-district of the Albula district. It is southwest of Tiefencastel on the left hand slope of the Oberhalbstein Range.

== Demographics ==
Mon had a population (as of 2013) of 90. As of 2008, 5.6% of the population was made up of foreign nationals. Over the last 10 years the population has grown at a rate of 7.1%. Most of the population (as of 2000) speaks Rhaeto-Romance (52.3%), with German being second most common (45.3%) and Italian being third ( 1.2%).

As of 2000, the gender distribution of the population was 46.7% male and 53.3% female. The age distribution, as of 2000, in Mon is; 13 people or 15.1% of the population are between 0 and 9 years old. 8 people or 9.3% are 10 to 14, and 1 people or 1.2% are 15 to 19. Of the adult population, 5 people or 5.8% of the population are between 20 and 29 years old. 11 people or 12.8% are 30 to 39, 17 people or 19.8% are 40 to 49, and 9 people or 10.5% are 50 to 59. The senior population distribution is 11 people or 12.8% of the population are between 60 and 69 years old, 9 people or 10.5% are 70 to 79, there are 2 people or 2.3% who are 80 to 89.

In the 2007 federal election the most popular party was the CVP which received 56.1% of the vote. The next three most popular parties were the SPS (24.3%), the SVP (13.8%) and the FDP (5.9%).

In Mon about 79.5% of the population (between age 25-64) have completed either non-mandatory upper secondary education or additional higher education (either university or a Fachhochschule).

Mon has an unemployment rate of 0.66%. As of 2005, there were 19 people employed in the primary economic sector and about 9 businesses involved in this sector. 2 people are employed in the secondary sector and there is 1 business in this sector. 11 people are employed in the tertiary sector, with 4 businesses in this sector.

The historical population is given in the following table:

year	population
1850	155
1900	112
1950	105
1960	91
1970	86
1980	66
1990	67
2000	86
2010	97

== Heritage sites of national significance ==
The baroque Church of St. Franziskus/S. Francestg is listed as a Swiss heritage sites of national significance. The Capuchin built church dates from 1643-48. The frescoes were finished by Johann Rudolf Sturn, but in 1915 were partially painted over. However, following the renovation in 1975, the original frescoes are once again visible.
