= Solis Viaduct =

Solis Viaduct Soliser Viadukt
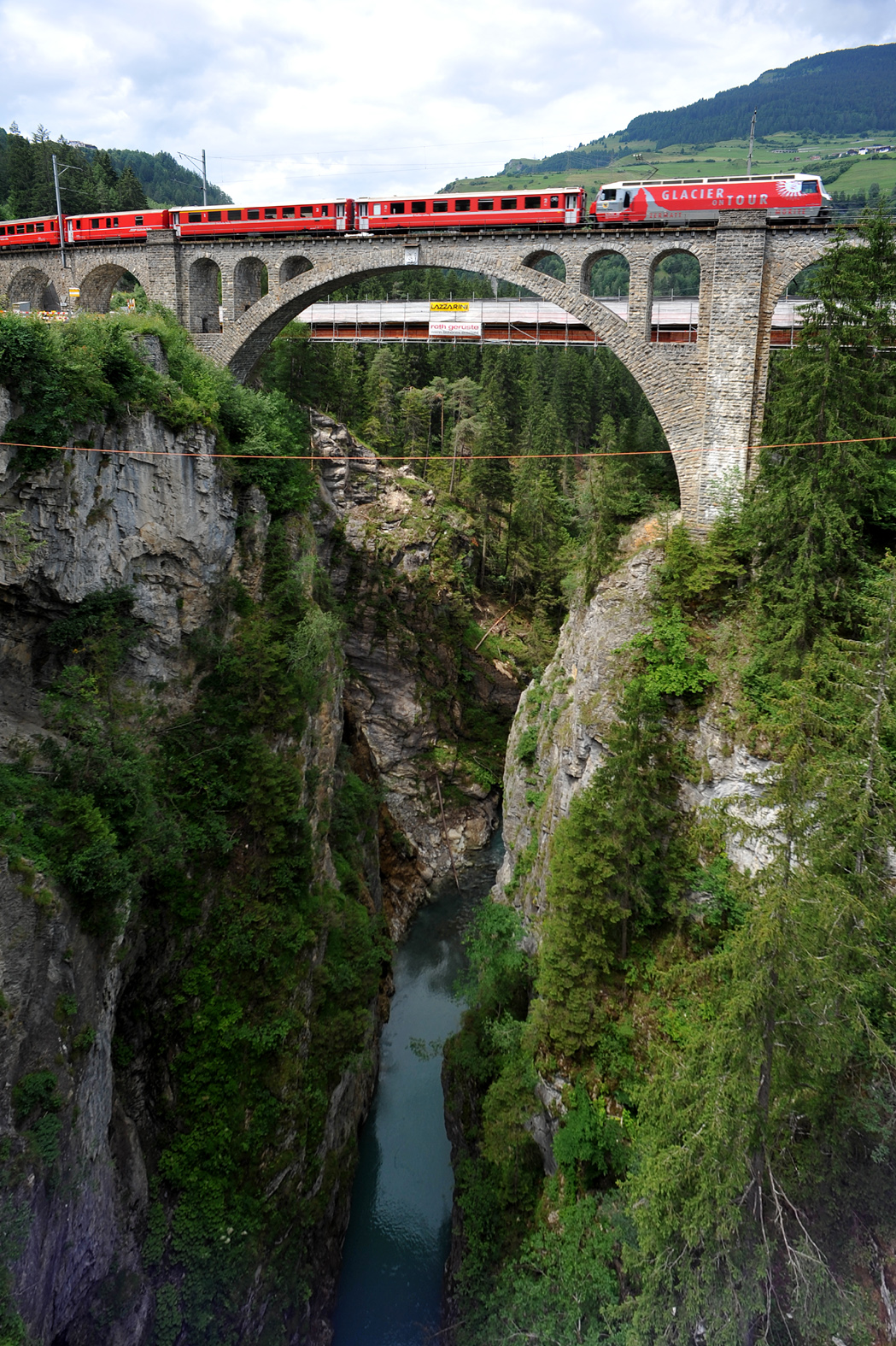
- Solis Viaduct
- Coordinates: 46°40′45″N 9°31′49″E
- Carries: Rhaetian Railway
- Crosses: Albula
- Locale: Solis, Switzerland
- Official name: Soliser Viadukt
- Owner: Rhaetian Railway
- Maintained by: Rhaetian Railway

Characteristics
- Design: Arch bridge, viaduct
- Material: Limestone
- Total length: 164 m (538 ft)
- Height: 86 m (282 ft)
- Longest span: 42 m (138 ft)
- No. of spans: 11

History
- Designer: Hans Studer
- Construction end: 1902
- Opened: 1902

Location
- Interactive map of Solis Viaduct

The Solis Viaduct (German: Soliser Viadukt) is a single track eleven-arched limestone railway viaduct. It spans the Albula east of the hamlet of Solis, in the canton of Graubünden, Switzerland.

Designed by the engineer Hans Studer, it was built in 1902 by Munari, Cayre und Marasi for the Rhaetian Railway, which still owns and uses it today. One of the most important structures on the World Heritage-listed Albula Railway, it is 89 metres (292 ft) high, 164 metres (538 ft) long, and has a main span of 42 metres (138 ft).

== Location ==
The Solis Viaduct forms part of the Albula Railway section between Thusis and Tiefencastel, and is at the 49.33 kilometres (30.65 mi) mark from Thusis. East of the viaduct is the Stausee Solis.

== Description ==
The limestone-built viaduct was conceived by Hans Studer as the first stone arch bridge in Switzerland to be designed in accordance with the elasticity theory. That choice of design allowed the use of a parabolic arch, and thus a very slim form of construction. Building costs could thereby be limited to 125,000 Swiss francs at 1902 prices.

With its height of 89 metres (292 ft), the Solis Viaduct is the highest on the Rhaetian Railway. It consists of a main span of 42 metres (138 ft) flanked by 10 other spans ranging from 8 metres (26 ft) to 10 metres (33 ft).

== Renovation ==
In 1997, the viaduct was renovated at great expense. The previous isolation between the gravel bed and walls was filled in by a new sealing system, incorporating liquid plastic film and shotcrete. In addition, the rails and ballast were renewed.

== Gallery ==
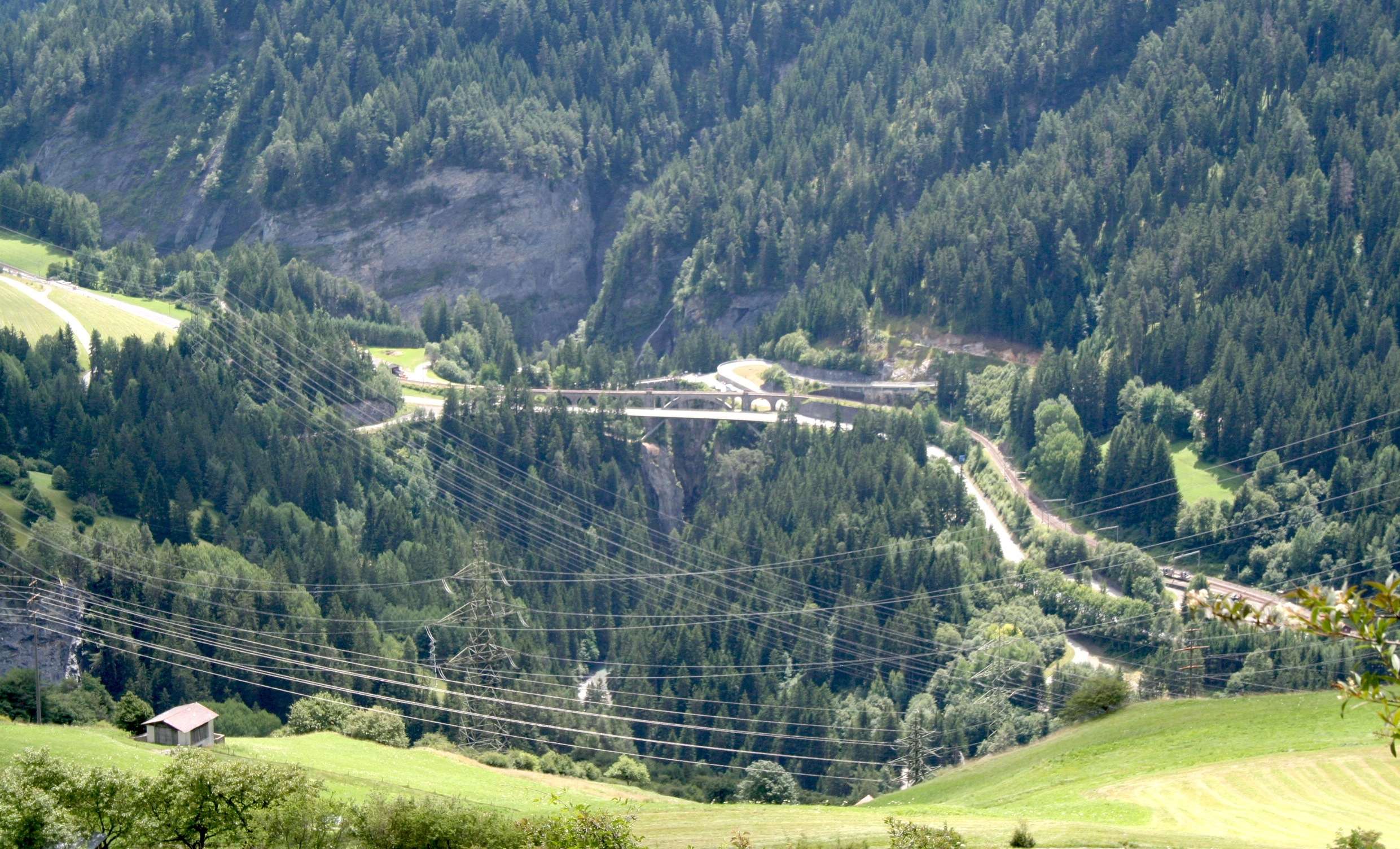
Schin gorge with the viaduct.

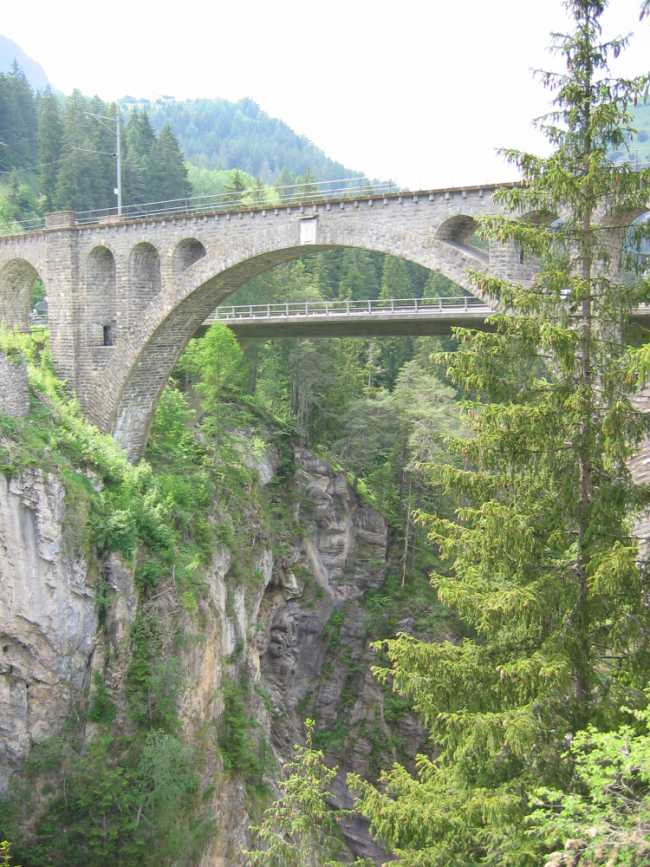
A closer view of the viaduct

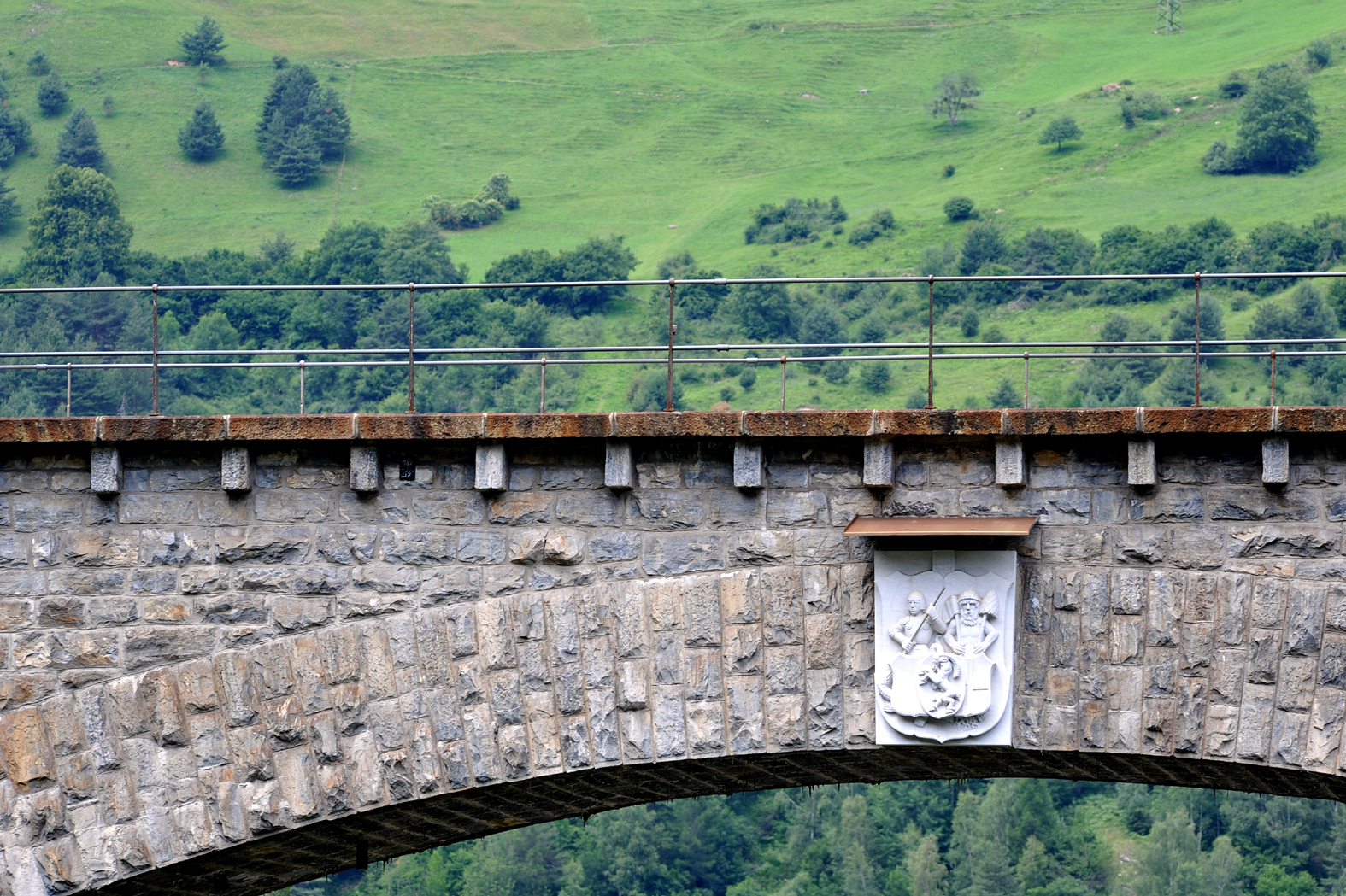
The new Graubünden coat of arms sculpture on the main span.

Aerial video of Solis Viaduct.

== See also ==
- Bernina Express
- Glacier Express
