= Brienz/Brinzauls =

Village in Graubünden, Switzerland

- Former municipality
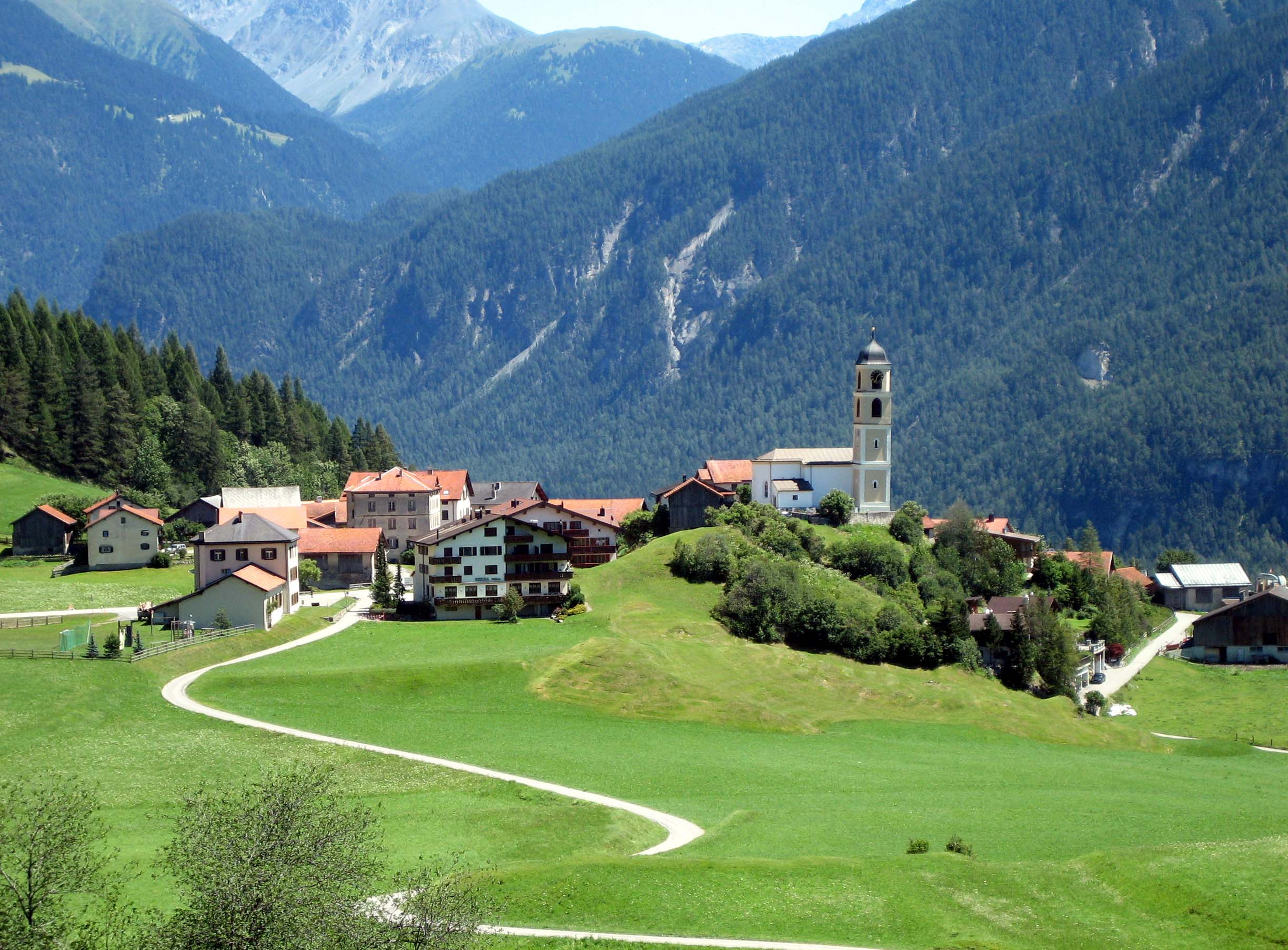

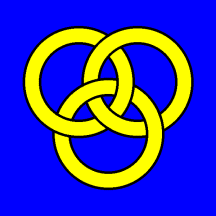
- Flag Coat of arms
- Location of Brienz/Brinzauls
- Location within Switzerland Location within Canton of Graubünden
- Coordinates: 46°40′N 9°36′E
- Country: Switzerland
- Canton: Graubünden
- District: Albula

Area
  - Total: 13.37 km^{2} (5.16 sq mi)
- Elevation: 1,144 m (3,753 ft)

Population
  - Total: 128
  - Density: 9.57/km^{2} (24.8/sq mi)
- Time zone: UTC+01:00 (CET)
  - Summer (DST): UTC+02:00 (CEST)
- Postal code: 7084
- SFOS number: 3512
- ISO 3166 code: CH-GR
- Surrounded by: Alvaneu, Alvaschein, Lantsch/Lenz, Surava, Tiefencastel
- Twin towns: Brienz, Bern (Switzerland)
- Website: www.albula-alvra.ch

Brienz/Brinzauls (German: Brienz, pronounced [briːnts]; Romansh: Brinzauls) is a village and former municipality in the district of Albula in the canton of Graubünden (Grisons) in Switzerland. On 1 January 2015, the former municipalities of Alvaschein, Mon, Stierva, Tiefencastel, Alvaneu, Brienz/Brinzauls and Surava merged to form the new municipality of Albula/Alvra.

The majority of the village's population speaks Swiss German, with a significant Romansh-speaking minority.

The village has been temporarily evacuated multiple times because of high risk of large rockfalls and landslipping.

== History ==
Brienz/Brinzauls is first mentioned around 840 as Brienzola. By the 12th century, the village was an economic center for the Bishop of Chur. The Lords of Brienz were first mentioned as the owners of a fortified tower in the village in 1259. The tower fell into ruin and was demolished in 1880. Until 1851, the village was part of the Herrschaft of Belfort. Between 1869 and 1883, Brienz/Brinzauls and Surava were united into a single political municipality. In 1874, a fire damaged or destroyed much of the village.

The village church was first mentioned in 840. In 1519, St. Calixtus became the patron saint of this church. In 1526, it separated from the parish of Lantsch/Lenz to become a parish. In 1725, Surava separated from Brienz/Brinzauls to form its own parish.

In 1870–73, the Landwasserstrasse was built which helped connect the village to the rest of the country. Beginning in the 1960s, the number of local farmers began to drop, however agriculture still remains important. In 1990, about 43% of all jobs in the municipality were in agriculture. In 1860, the entire population spoke Romansh. By 1990, it had dropped to only 58%.

=== Glacier melt and landslide concerns ===
On 9 May 2023, residents were ordered to evacuate the village due to a determination by geologists that 2,000,000 cubic metres (71,000,000 cu ft) of rock from the mountain above was expected to collapse into the valley that includes the village. At that time, the population of the village was less than 100 residents. The entire village sits upon a layer of saturated soft-rock permeated by glacial melt from the mountains above. The growth of and consequential increase in pressure on the water deposit below has led the 150-metre-thick (490 ft) layer above to slide southwards at a rate of roughly 1.5 metres (4 ft 11 in) annually. This had frequently caused damage to and the destruction of infrastructure in the region. Areas at higher elevations on the mountain to the north are moving at a far faster rate of 3 to 10 metres (9.8 to 32.8 ft) per year. Landslides and falling rocks are thus a frequent hazard for residents and the Albula rail line, which services the village; it is estimated that nearly 10 billion m^{3} (350 billion cu ft) of rock are moving in its direction.

A researcher at the University of Cambridge attributed the impending collapse–expected in May 2023 to occur within a week to 24 days–to climate change that is driving glacier melt in the Alps. Simon Löw, emeritus professor of Engineering Geology at ETH Zurich, disputed a link to climate change, citing the lack of thawing permafrost and any correlation between annual rainfall and the speed at which the slope slides. Two roads and the railway line were also closed. There was, as predicted, a massive rockfall on the night of 15–16 June 2023 which stopped just before the village, with no damage reported to the buildings. Municipal officials ended the evacuation of the village on 3 July, while emphasizing that future evacuations could remain necessary.

=== 2024 evacuation ===
In 2024, the movement of an additional 1.2 million m^{3} (42 million cu ft) of rock was detected. It was thought that the relatively slow movement of the rock mass could give villagers additional time, in the range of several months, but a sudden collapse, like that of 2023, was not ruled out; such an event would give no time for the inhabitants of the village to flee. Efforts were made in 2024 to reduce pressure on the deposit prior to its eventual collapse. Civil engineers sought to drain the meltwater deposit by tunneling underneath both layers and the mountain above. On 9 November 2024, it was announced that there was a serious fear of the collapse of about 5 million cubic metres of land, and an urgent need for an emergency evacuation of the village. A new evacuation for the village’s 91 residents, as well as their pets and livestock, was ordered to be carried out by November 17th at the latest. Personal belongings and the retable of the village's 500-year-old church were transported out of the village as well. Since then, access to the village and its immediate environs has been prohibited, and it has been classified as a "red zone" by cantonal authorities.

In December 2024, government and cantonal officials from Grisons announced that they were prepared to offer 90% of the financing necessary to relocate the village's population. Although the 2023 evacuation lasted only 51 days, this one is expected to last far longer, and may possibly be permanent. Even if, in the future, the village is deemed safe for public access, funds will be available for those who do not feel comfortable in their return.

== Geography ==
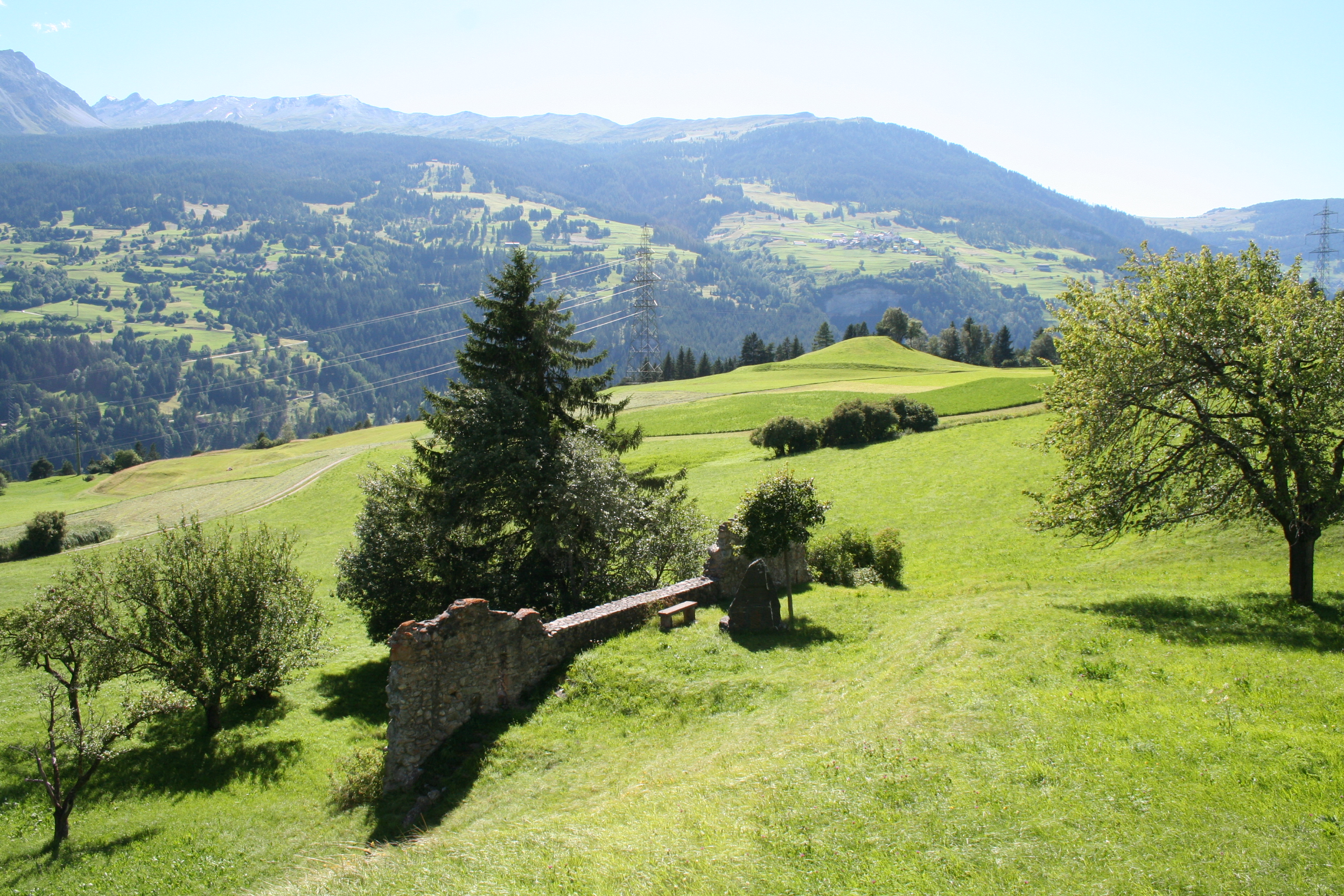
Hillside near Vazerol, containing a memorial to the unification of the Three Leagues

Aerial view of the village (1954)

Before the merger, Brienz/Brinzauls had a total area of 13.4 km^{2} (5.2 mi^{2}). Of this area, 22.8% is used for agricultural purposes, while 50.8% is forested. Of the rest of the land, 2.1% is settled (buildings or roads) and the remainder (24.3%) is non-productive (rivers, glaciers or mountains).

The village is located north of the Albula River on the road from Lenzerheide to Davos. It is a Haufendorf (an irregular, unplanned and quite closely packed village, built around a central square) on a terrace to the north and above the river.

It consists of the village of Brienz/Brinzauls and the hamlet of Vazerol at the Julier Pass. Until 1996, Brienz/Brinzauls was known as Brienz (GR).

== Demographics ==
The historical population is given in the following table:

Year	Population
1850	191
1860	205
1888	146
1900	158
1941	186
1950	172
1980	95
1990	112
2000	117

As of 2013, Brienz/Brinzauls had a population of 128. As of 2008, 1.9% of the population was made up of foreign nationals. Over the last decade, the population has decreased at a rate of -12.6%. Most of the population (as of 2000) speaks German (68.4%), with the rest speaking Romansh (31.6%).

As of 2000, the gender distribution of the population was 50.0% male and 50.0% female. The age distribution, as of 2000, in Brienz/Brinzauls is; 14 people or 12.0% of the population are between 0 and 9 years old. Eight people or 6.8% are 10 to 14, and two people or 1.7% are 15 to 19. Of the adult population, 12 people or 10.3% of the population are between 20 and 29 years old. Nineteen people or 16.2% are 30 to 39, 16 people or 13.7% are 40 to 49, and five people or 4.3% are 50 to 59. The senior population distribution is 24 people or 20.5% of the population are between 60 and 69 years old, 15 people or 12.8% are 70 to 79, there are two people or 1.7% who are 80 to 89.

In the 2007 federal election, the most popular party was the SVP which received 50.6% of the vote. The next three most popular parties were the CVP (30%), the SPS (12.5%) and the FDP (6.9%).

The entire Swiss population is generally well educated. In Brienz/Brinzauls, about 66.1% of the population (between age 25–64) have completed either non-mandatory upper secondary education or additional higher education (either university or a Fachhochschule).

Brienz/Brinzauls has an unemployment rate of 0.72%. As of 2005, there were 10 people employed in the primary economic sector and about four businesses involved in this sector. Six people are employed in the secondary sector and there are two businesses in this sector. Four people are employed in the tertiary sector, with two businesses in this sector.
