= Lantsch/Lenz =

- Municipality
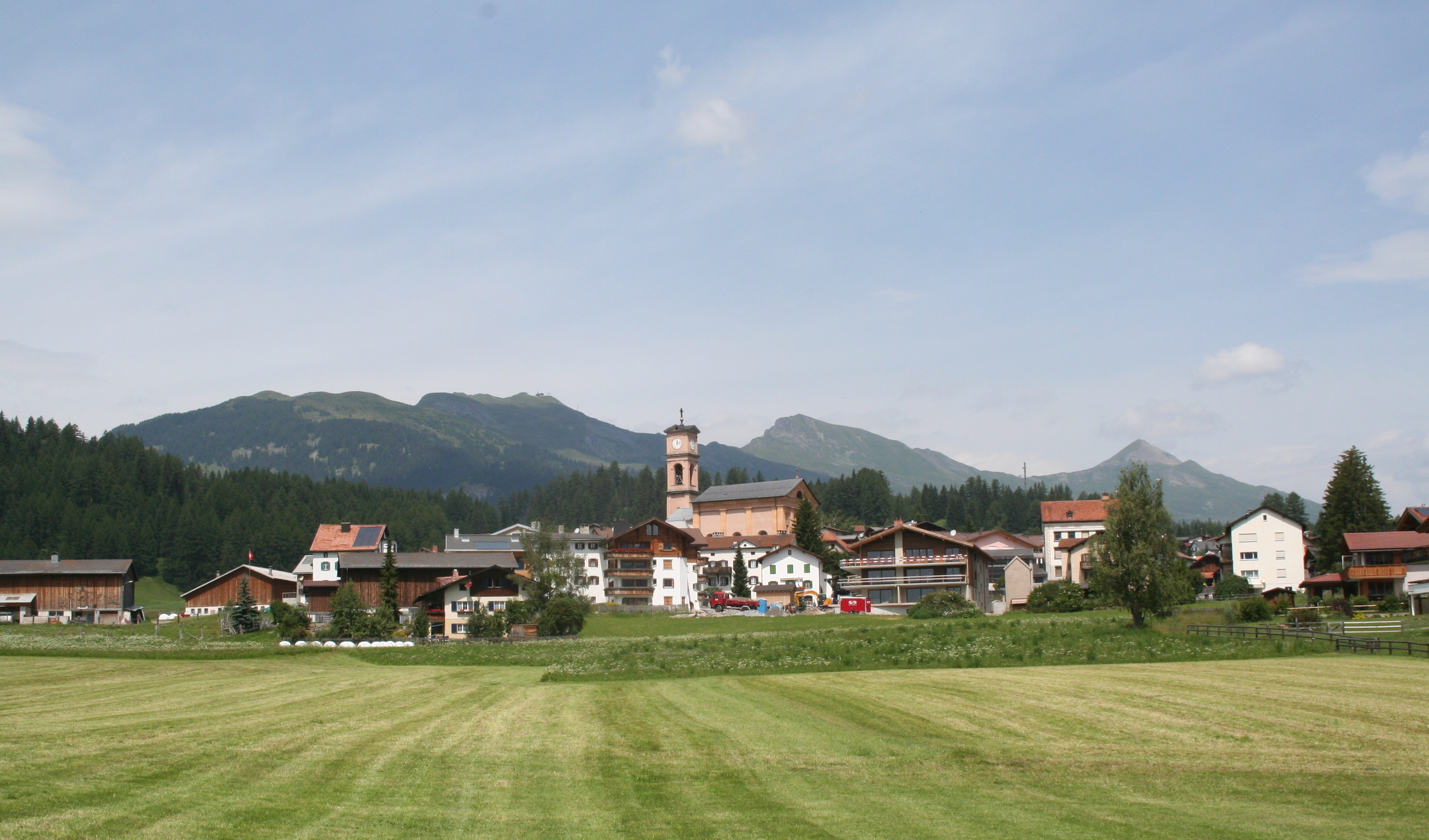
- Lantsch/Lenz

- Flag Coat of arms
- Location of Lantsch/Lenz
- Location within Switzerland Location within Canton of Grisons
- Coordinates: 46°41′N 9°34′E
- Country: Switzerland
- Canton: Grisons
- District: Albula

Area
  - Total: 21.82 km^{2} (8.42 sq mi)
- Elevation: 1,328 m (4,357 ft)

Population (December 2020)
  - Total: 560
  - Density: 26/km^{2} (66/sq mi)
- Time zone: UTC+01:00 (CET)
  - Summer (DST): UTC+02:00 (CEST)
- Postal code: 7083
- SFOS number: 3513
- ISO 3166 code: CH-GR
- Surrounded by: Alvaneu, Alvaschein, Arosa, Brienz/Brinzauls, Vaz/Obervaz
- Website: www.lantsch-lenz.ch

Lantsch/Lenz (German: Lenz, Romansh: Lantsch) is a municipality in the Albula Region in the canton of the Grisons in Switzerland.

The majority of its population is German-speaking, with a significant Romansh-speaking minority.

== History ==
Lantsch/Lenz is first mentioned around 850 as Lanzes.

== Geography ==
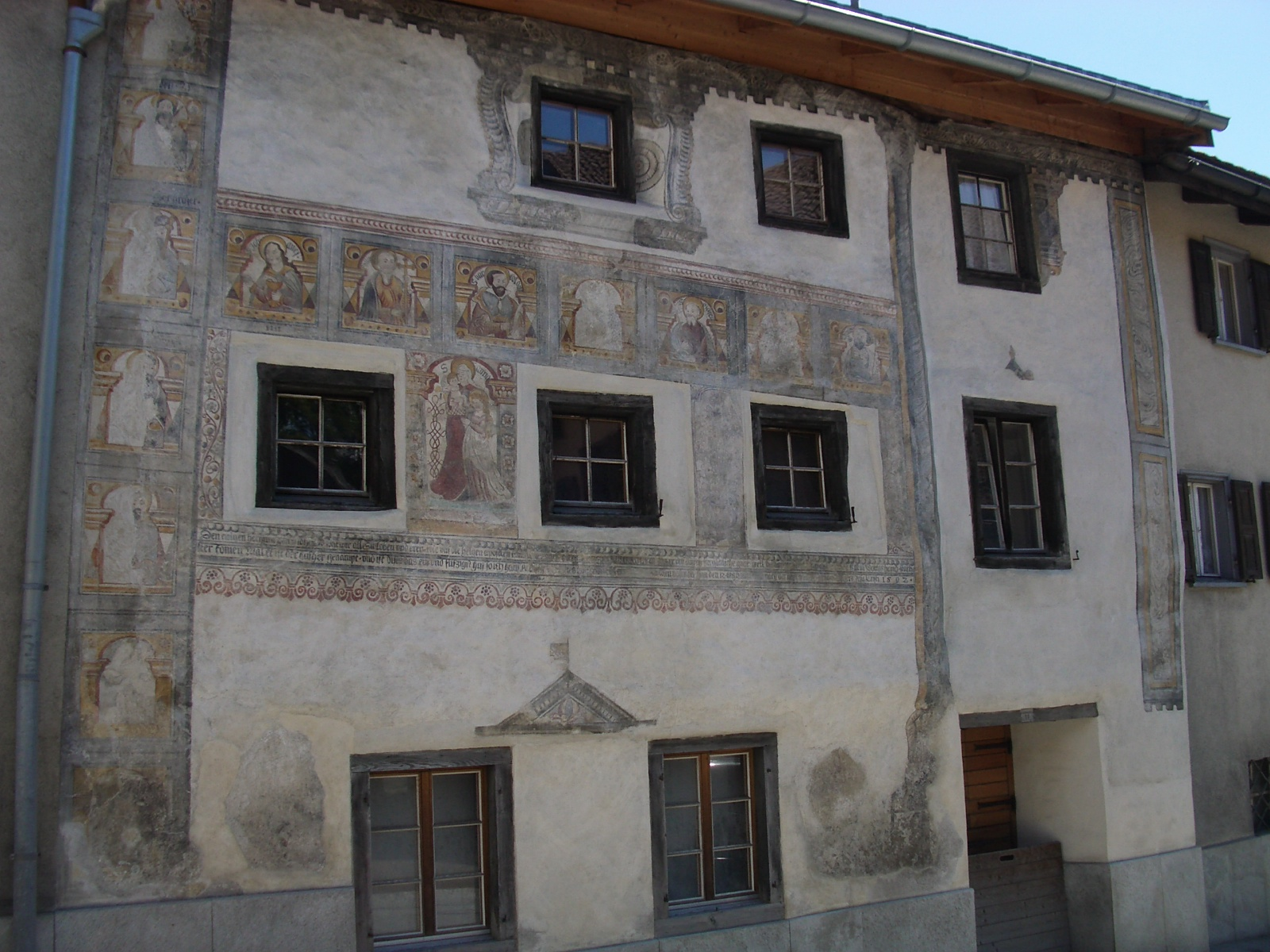
Painted house in Lantsch/Lenz

Aerial view (1947)

Lantsch/Lenz has an area, as of 2006, of 21.8 km^{2} (8.4 sq mi). Of this area, 27% is used for agricultural purposes, while 34.4% is forested. Of the rest of the land, 3.8% is settled (buildings or roads) and the remainder (34.8%) is non-productive (rivers, glaciers or mountains).

Until 2017, the municipality was located in the Belfort sub-district of the Albula district, after 2017 it was part of the Albula Region. It is located at an elevation of 1,294 m (4,245 ft) on a terrace above the right side of the Albula river. It consists of the linear village of Lantsch/Lenz. Until 1943 Lantsch/Lenz was known as Lenz.

== Demographics ==
Lantsch/Lenz has a population (as of 31 December 2020) of 560. As of 2008, 12.5% of the population was made up of foreign nationals. Over the last 10 years the population has grown at a rate of 1.5%. Most of the population (as of 2000) speaks German (54.2%), with Romansh being second most common (36.7%) and Albanian being third ( 2.5%).

As of 2000, the gender distribution of the population was 51.6% male and 48.4% female. The age distribution, as of 2000, in Lantsch/Lenz is; 49 people or 10.1% of the population are between 0 and 9 years old. 32 people or 6.6% are 10 to 14, and 29 people or 6.0% are 15 to 19. Of the adult population, 36 people or 7.4% of the population are between 20 and 29 years old. 76 people or 15.7% are 30 to 39, 66 people or 13.6% are 40 to 49, and 61 people or 12.6% are 50 to 59. The senior population distribution is 56 people or 11.5% of the population are between 60 and 69 years old, 61 people or 12.6% are 70 to 79, there are 16 people or 3.3% who are 80 to 89, and there are 3 people or 0.6% who are 90 to 99.

In the 2007 federal election the most popular party was the CVP which received 38.9% of the vote. The next three most popular parties were the SVP (33.2%), the SPS (16.2%) and the FDP (10.8%).

The entire Swiss population is generally well educated. In Lantsch/Lenz about 73.7% of the population (between age 25-64) have completed either non-mandatory upper secondary education or additional higher education (either university or a Fachhochschule).

Lantsch/Lenz has an unemployment rate of 2.24%. As of 2005, there were 24 people employed in the primary economic sector and about 9 businesses involved in this sector. 25 people are employed in the secondary sector and there are 5 businesses in this sector. 83 people are employed in the tertiary sector, with 31 businesses in this sector.

The historical population is given in the following table:

year	population
1710	215
1850	353
1900	363
1950	355
1960	366
1970	373
1980	382
1990	453
2000	485

== Heritage sites of national significance ==
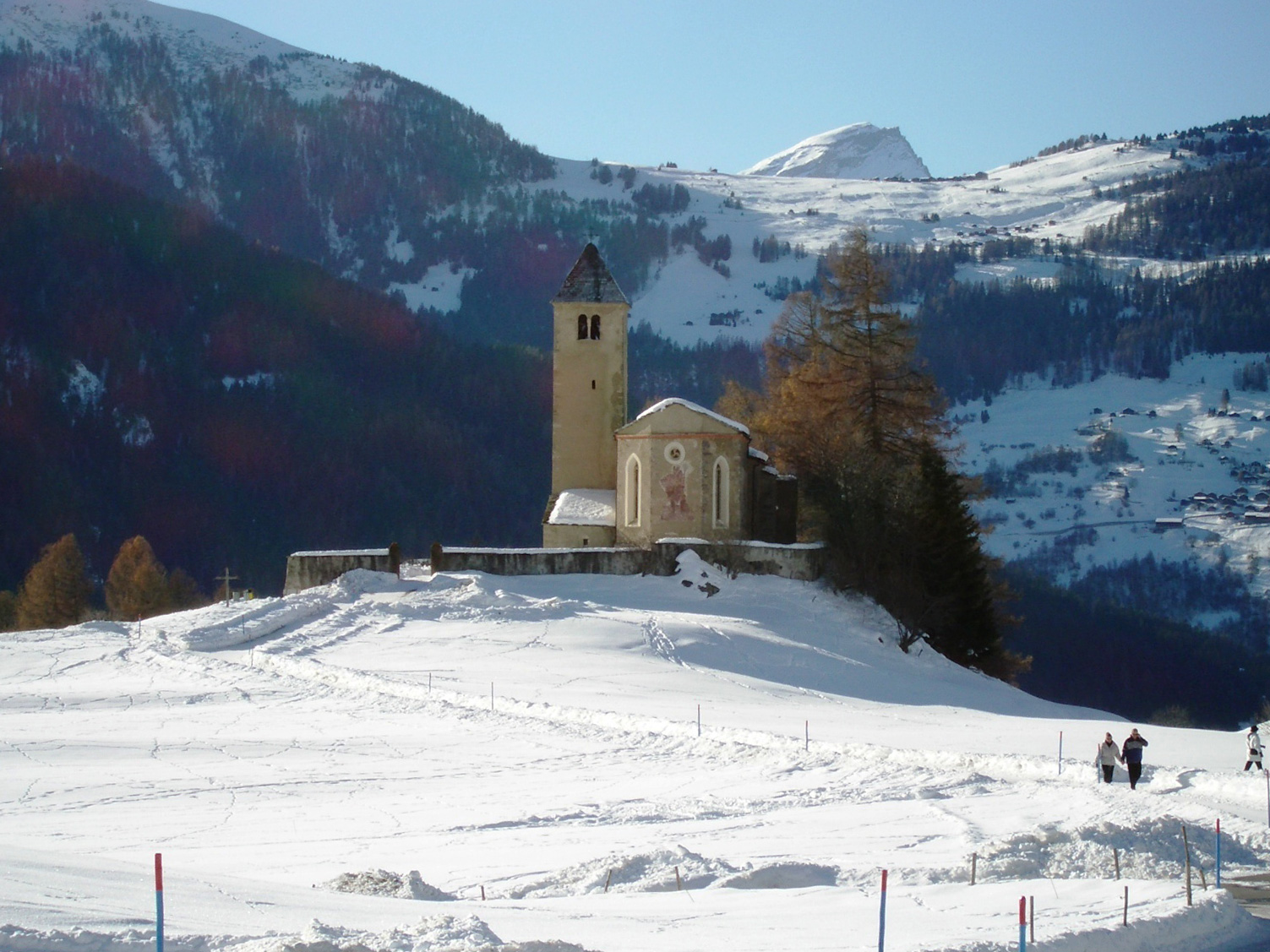
St. Mary's church in Lantsch/Lenz

St. Mary's Church in Lantsch/Lenz is listed as a Swiss heritage sites of national significance.
