= Stierva =

- Former municipality
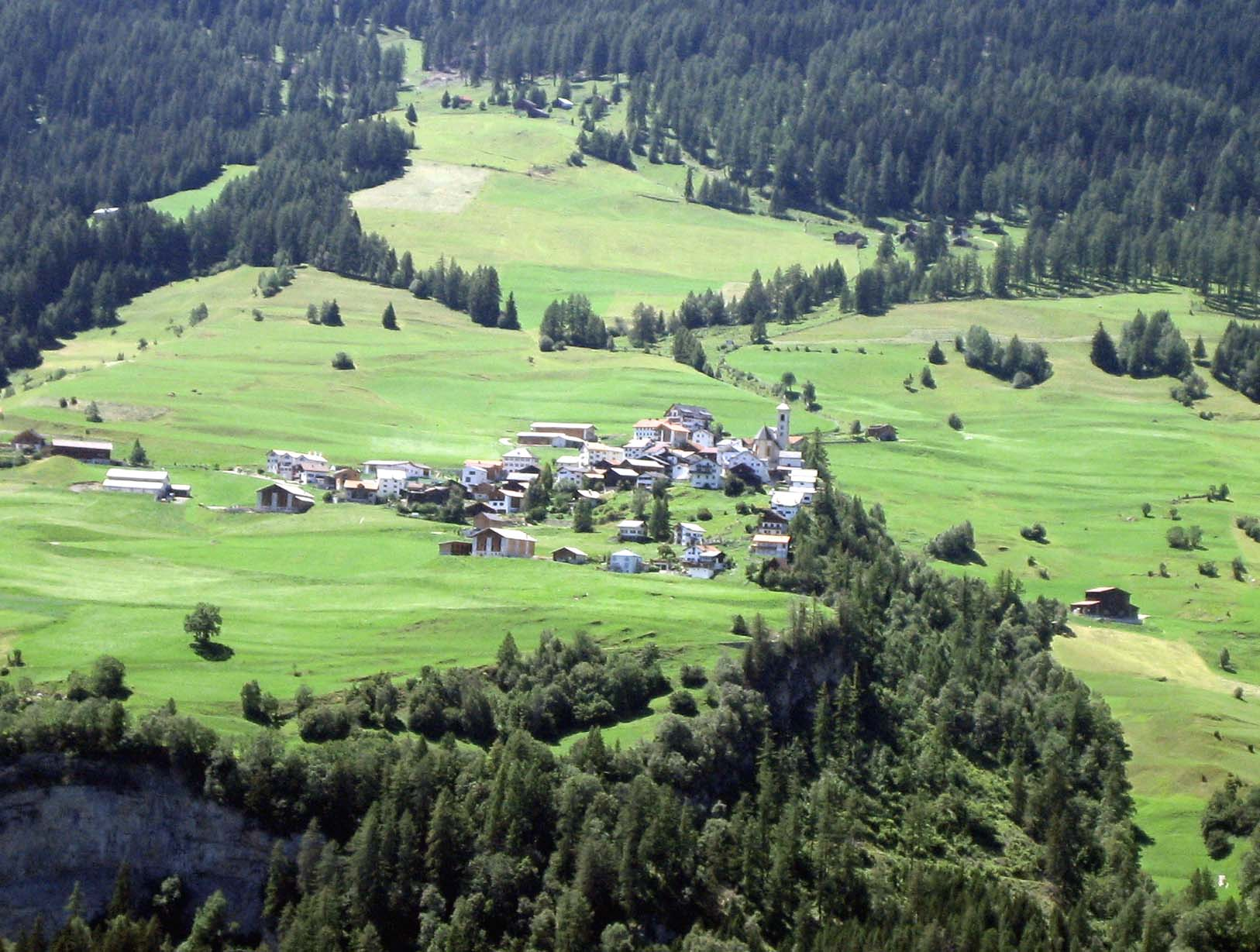

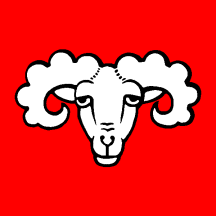
- Flag Coat of arms
- Location of Stierva
- Location within Switzerland Location within Canton of Graubünden
- Coordinates: 46°39′N 9°32′E
- Country: Switzerland
- Canton: Graubünden
- District: Albula

Area
  - Total: 10.54 km^{2} (4.07 sq mi)
- Elevation: 1,375 m (4,511 ft)

Population (Dec 2013)
  - Total: 134
  - Density: 12.7/km^{2} (32.9/sq mi)
- Time zone: UTC+01:00 (CET)
  - Summer (DST): UTC+02:00 (CEST)
- Postal code: 7459
- SFOS number: 3504
- ISO 3166 code: CH-GR
- Surrounded by: Alvaschein, Mon, Mutten, Salouf, Tiefencastel, Vaz/Obervaz, Zillis-Reischen
- Website: www.albula-alvra.ch

Stierva is a village and former municipality in the district of Albula in the canton of Graubünden in Switzerland. On 1 January 2015 the former municipalities of Alvaschein, Mon, Stierva, Tiefencastel, Alvaneu, Brienz/Brinzauls and Surava merged to form the new municipality of Albula/Alvra.

In the 2000 census, some two-thirds of the population declared Romansh as a first language, with most of the rest speaking German.

== History ==
Stierva is first mentioned in 841 Seturiuo. Until 1943 Stierva was known as Stürvis.

== Geography ==
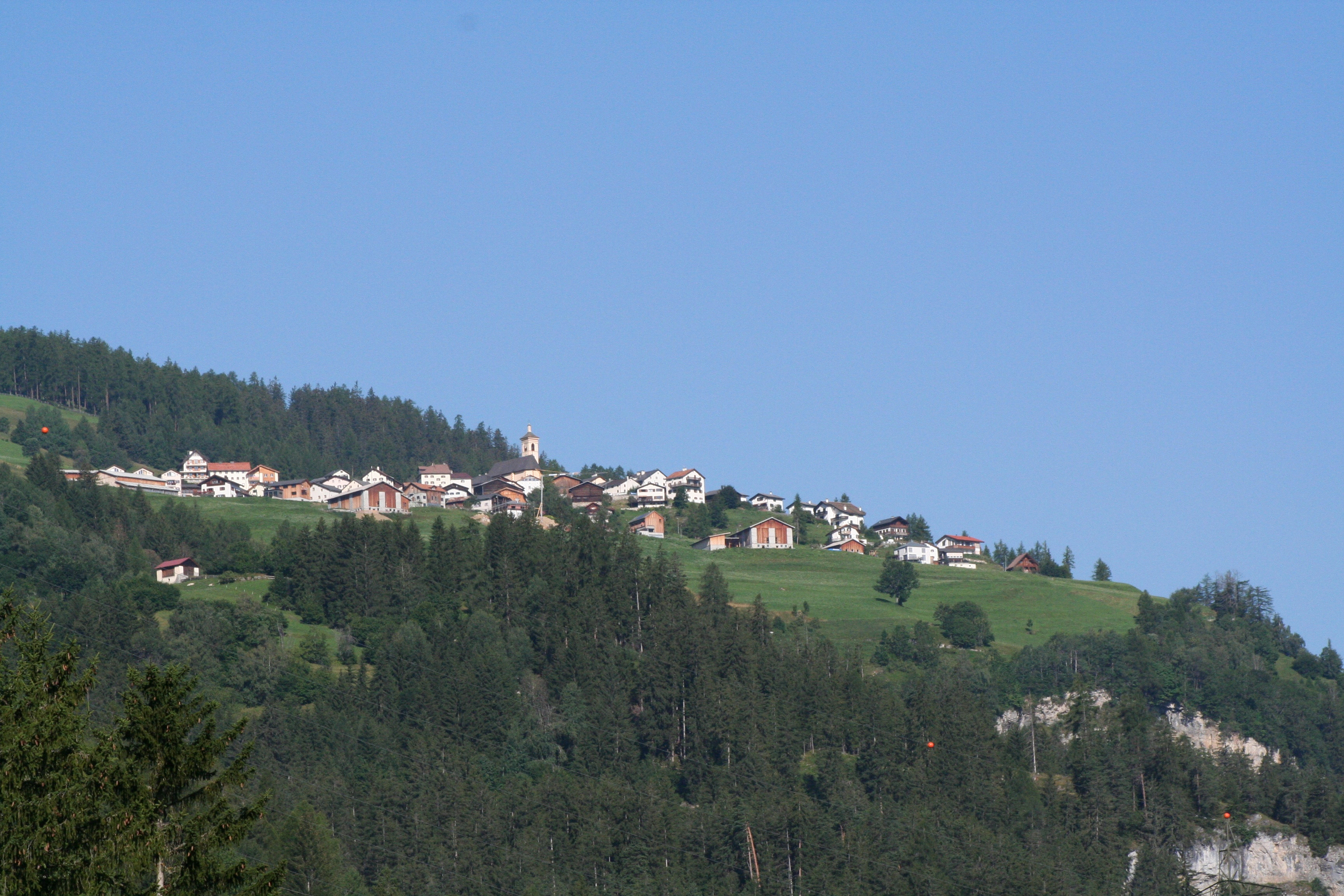
Stierva as seen from Tiefencastel

Before the merger, Stierva had a total area of 10.5 km^{2} (4.1 mi^{2}). Of this area, 49.3% is used for agricultural purposes, while 42.1% is forested. Of the rest of the land, 1.8% is settled (buildings or roads) and the remainder (6.7%) is non-productive (rivers, glaciers or mountains).

The village is located in the Alvaschein sub-district of the Albula district. It is a haufendorf (an irregular, unplanned and quite closely packed village, built around a central square) above the lower Albula valley.

== Demographics ==
Stierva had a population (as of 2013) of 134. As of 2008, 1.5% of the population was made up of foreign nationals. Over the last 10 years the population has decreased at a rate of -5.8%. Most of the population (as of 2000) speaks Rhaeto-Romance (66.4%), with German being second most common (32.8%) and Italian being third ( 0.8%).

As of 2000, the gender distribution of the population was 46.6% male and 53.4% female. The age distribution, as of 2000, in Stierva is; 20 people or 15.6% of the population are between 0 and 9 years old. 6 people or 4.7% are 10 to 14, and people or 0.0% are 15 to 19. Of the adult population, 17 people or 13.3% of the population are between 20 and 29 years old. 21 people or 16.4% are 30 to 39, 15 people or 11.7% are 40 to 49, and 12 people or 9.4% are 50 to 59. The senior population distribution is 13 people or 10.2% of the population are between 60 and 69 years old, 16 people or 12.5% are 70 to 79, there are 7 people or 5.5% who are 80 to 89, and there is 1 person or 0.8% who are 90 to 99.

In the 2007 federal election the most popular party was the CVP which received 45.2% of the vote. The next three most popular parties were the SVP (40.6%), the SPS (7.8%) and the FDP (5.9%).

In Stierva about 66.7% of the population (between age 25-64) have completed either non-mandatory upper secondary education or additional higher education (either university or a Fachhochschule).

Stierva has an unemployment rate of 0%. As of 2005, there were 21 people employed in the primary economic sector and about 11 businesses involved in this sector. 6 people are employed in the secondary sector and there are 2 businesses in this sector. 7 people are employed in the tertiary sector, with 4 businesses in this sector.

The historical population is given in the following table:

year	population
1850	179
1900	150
1950	150
1960	130
1970	114
1980	113
1990	100
2000	137
2010	140
