= Tiefencastel =

- Former municipality
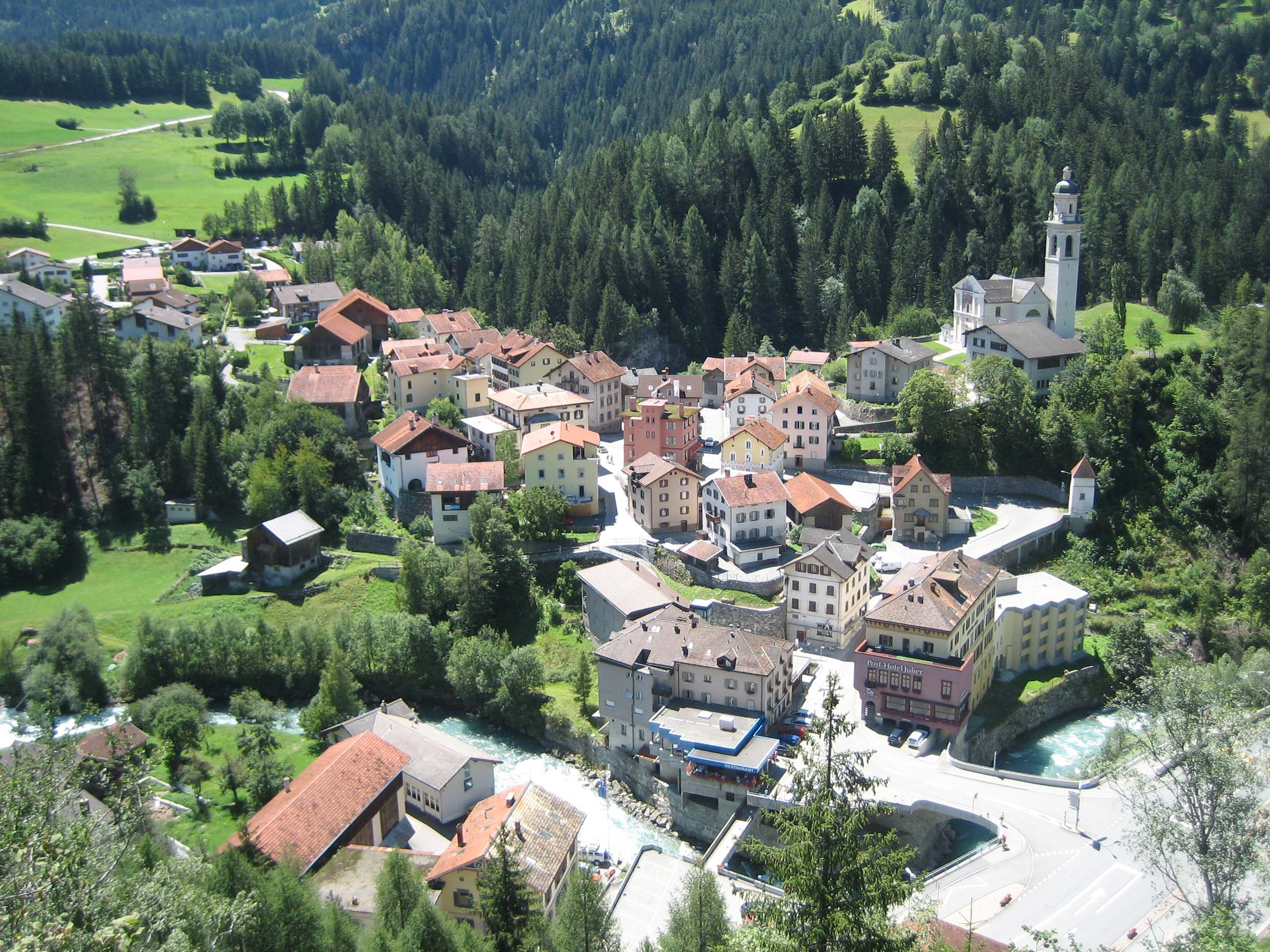

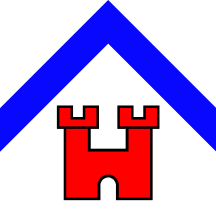
- Flag Coat of arms
- Location of Tiefencastel
- Location within Switzerland Location within Canton of Graubünden
- Coordinates: 46°39′N 9°34′E
- Country: Switzerland
- Canton: Graubünden
- District: Albula

Area
  - Total: 14.85 km^{2} (5.73 sq mi)
- Elevation (Suloms): 884 m (2,900 ft)

Population (Dec 2013)
  - Total: 254
  - Density: 17.1/km^{2} (44.3/sq mi)
- Time zone: UTC+01:00 (CET)
  - Summer (DST): UTC+02:00 (CEST)
- Postal code: 7450
- SFOS number: 3505
- ISO 3166 code: CH-GR
- Surrounded by: Alvaneu, Alvaschein, Brienz/Brinzauls, Cunter, Filisur, Mon, Riom-Parsonz, Savognin, Stierva, Surava
- Website: www.albula-alvra.ch

Tiefencastel (Romansh: Casti) is a village and a former municipality in the district of Albula in the canton of Graubünden in Switzerland. On 1 January 2015 the former municipalities of Alvaschein, Mon, Stierva, Tiefencastel, Alvaneu, Brienz/Brinzauls and Surava merged to form the new municipality of Albula/Alvra.

== History ==
Tiefencastel is first mentioned in 831 as in Castello Impitinis. Starting around in the 14th century it was known as Tüffenkasten.

== Geography ==
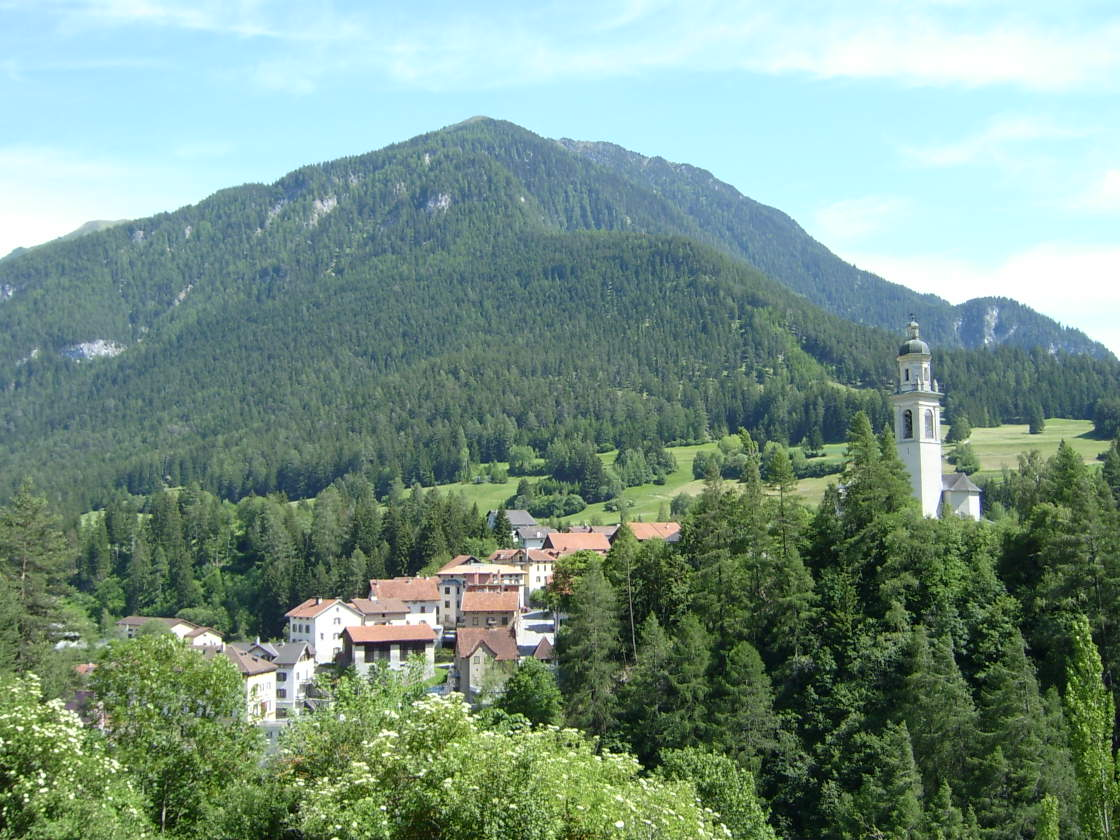
Village of Tiefencastel from the west

Aerial view (1947)

Before the merger, Tiefencastel had a total area of 14.9 km^{2} (5.8 mi^{2}). Of this area, 20.3% is used for agricultural purposes, while 49.6% is forested. Of the rest of the land, 3.1% is settled (buildings or roads) and the remainder (27%) is non-productive (rivers, glaciers or mountains).

It was the capital of the Albula district. The former municipality is located at the foot of the Albula and Julier passes.

== Demographics ==
Tiefencastel had a population (as of 2013) of 254. As of 2008, 15.7% of the population was made up of foreign nationals. Over the last 10 years the population has decreased at a rate of -2.2%. Most of the population (as of 2000) speaks German (58.3%), with Romansh being second most common language (37.8%) and Italian the third ( 1.3%).

As of 2000, the gender distribution of the population was 49.6% male and 50.4% female. The age distribution, as of 2000, in Tiefencastel is; 37 people or 16.1% of the population are between 0 and 9 years old. 16 people or 7.0% are 10 to 14, and 8 people or 3.5% are 15 to 19. Of the adult population, 23 people or 10.0% of the population are between 20 and 29 years old. 36 people or 15.7% are 30 to 39, 36 people or 15.7% are 40 to 49, and 27 people or 11.7% are 50 to 59. The senior population distribution is 25 people or 10.9% of the population are between 60 and 69 years old, 15 people or 6.5% are 70 to 79, there are 6 people or 2.6% who are 80 to 89, and there are 1 people or 0.4% who are 90 to 99.

In the 2007 federal election the most popular party was the CVP which received 42.5% of the vote. The next three most popular parties were the SVP (30.9%), the SPS (13.6%) and the FDP (12.8%).

In Tiefencastel about 69.6% of the population (between age 25 and 64) have completed either non-mandatory upper secondary education or additional higher education (either university or a Fachhochschule).

Tiefencastel has an unemployment rate of 1.93%. As of 2005, there were 7 people employed in the primary economic sector and about 3 businesses involved in this sector. 73 people are employed in the secondary sector and there are 8 businesses in this sector. 133 people are employed in the tertiary sector, with 29 businesses in this sector.

The historical population is given in the following table:

year	population
1850	135
1880	209
1900	257
1950	327
1960	306
1970	310
1980	277
1990	239
2000	241
2010	269

== Climate ==
Tiefencastel has an average of 98.6 days of rain per year and on average receives 784 mm (30.9 in) of precipitation. The wettest month is August during which time Tiefencastel receives an average of 110 mm (4.3 in) of precipitation. During this month there is precipitation for an average of 10.8 days. The month with the most days of precipitation is June, with an average of 11.3, but with only 92 mm (3.6 in) of precipitation. The driest month of the year is February with an average of 35 mm (1.4 in) of precipitation over 10.8 days.

== Heritage sites of national significance ==
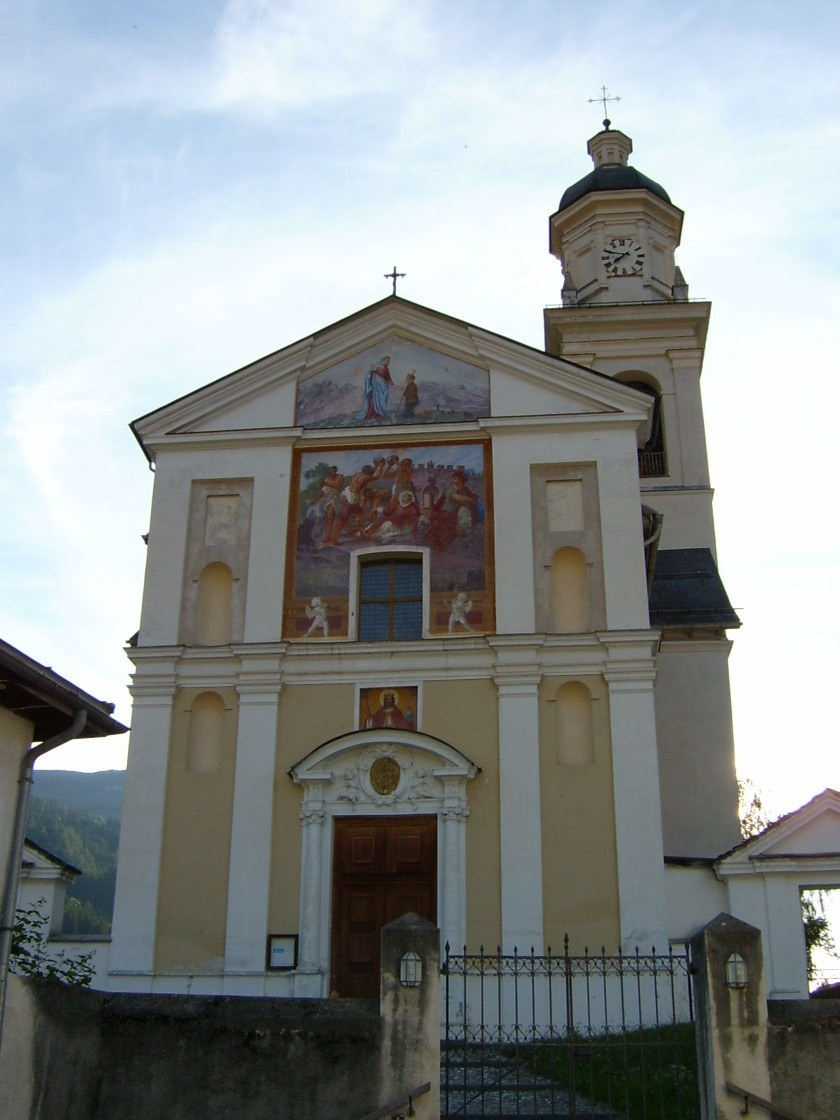
Parish church of St. Stefan/S. Stefan

The Church of St. Stefan/S. Stefan is listed as a Swiss heritage sites of national significance. The church was first mentioned in 1343. In 1650 it was rebuilt and expanded by the Capuchin monks. During this renovation it was given extensive wood carvings and paintings.

== Transportation ==
Rhaetian Railway operates trains to Tiefencastel (Rhaetian Railway station). On 13 August 2014, a passenger train was struck by a landslide and derailed a kilometre west of the station. Eleven people were injured.
