= Rona, Switzerland =

Village in Switzerland

Rona
- Former municipality
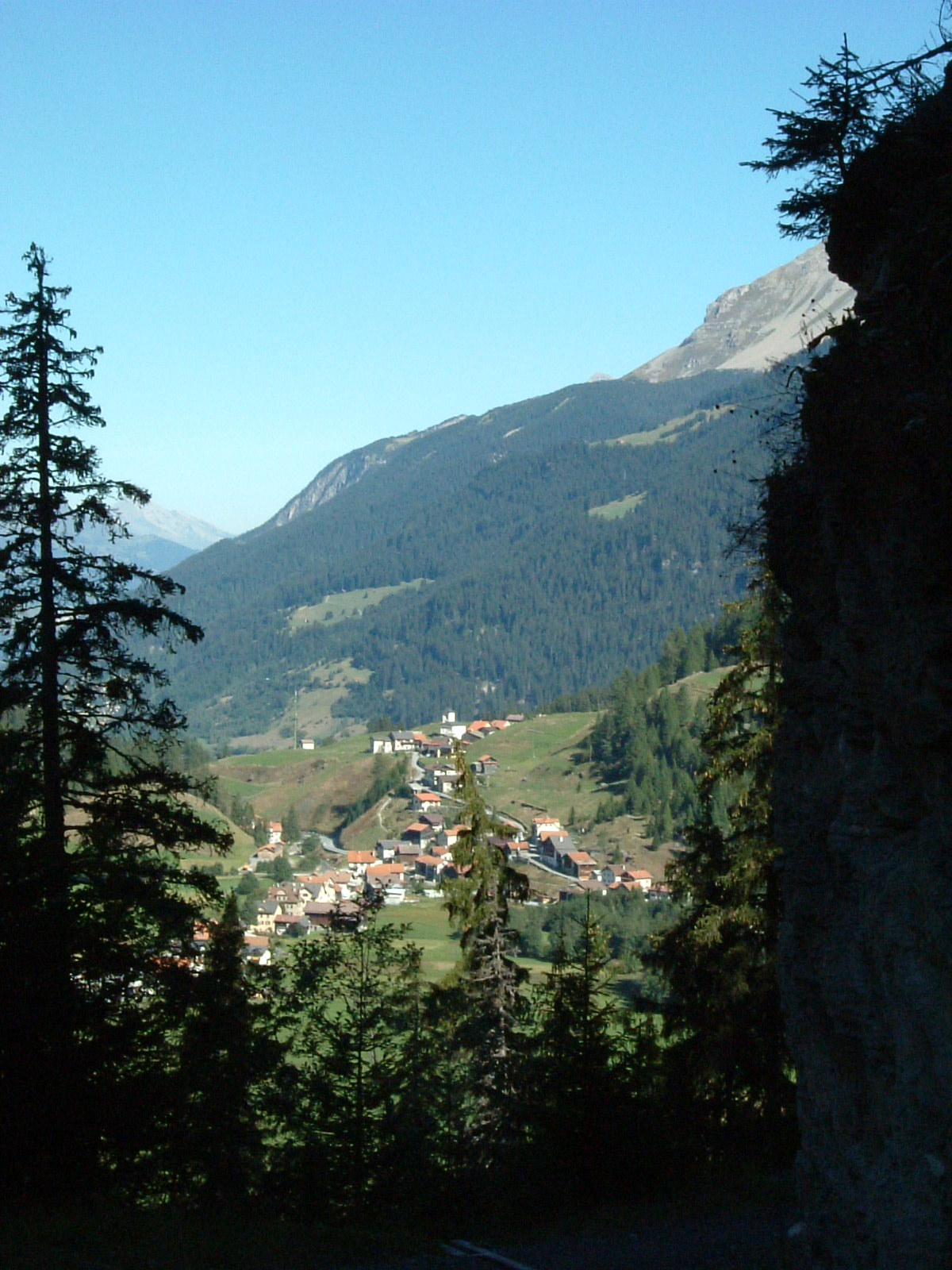

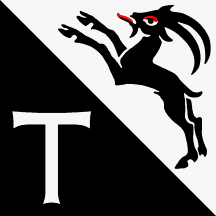
- Flag Coat of arms
- Location of Rona
- Location within Switzerland Location within Canton of Grisons
- Coordinates: 46°33′N 9°37′E
- Country: Switzerland
- Canton: Grisons
- District: Albula

Government
  - Executive: Gemeindevorstand
  - Mayor: Gemeindepräsident

Area
  - Total: 6.49 km^{2} (2.51 sq mi)
- Elevation: 1,408 m (4,619 ft)

Population
  - Total: 58
  - Density: 8.9/km^{2} (23/sq mi)
- Time zone: UTC+01:00 (CET)
  - Summer (DST): UTC+02:00 (CEST)
- Postal code: 7454
- SFOS number: 3537
- ISO 3166 code: CH-GR
- Surrounded by: Mulegns, Savognin, Sur, Tinizong
- Website: www.tinizong-rona.ch

Rona is a village and former in Switzerland situated beside the river Gelgia. The village consists of three parts, the old lower village (Rona), the upper village (Ruegna) and the new lower village (Rieven). There is a church in the upper village and two pubs/restaurants in the old lower village. The village used to be a municipality on its own. It was then part of Tinizong-Rona after merging with Tinizong in 1998 and later became part of the Surses administrative area.

The valley in which the village lies was chosen as the site of a hydroelectric dam but, following local protest, the village was spared and the dam moved upstream to Mamorera.
