= Marmorera (disambiguation) =

Marmorera is a village and former municipality in the Sursés municipality, district of Albula, canton of Graubünden, Switzerland.

Marmorera may also refer to:

- Lai da Marmorera (Marmorera Lake), reservoir
- Marmorera (film), 2007 Swiss film
