= Gelgia =

River in Switzerland

Gelgia (romansh) Romansh: Gülgia, German: Julia, Italian: Julia
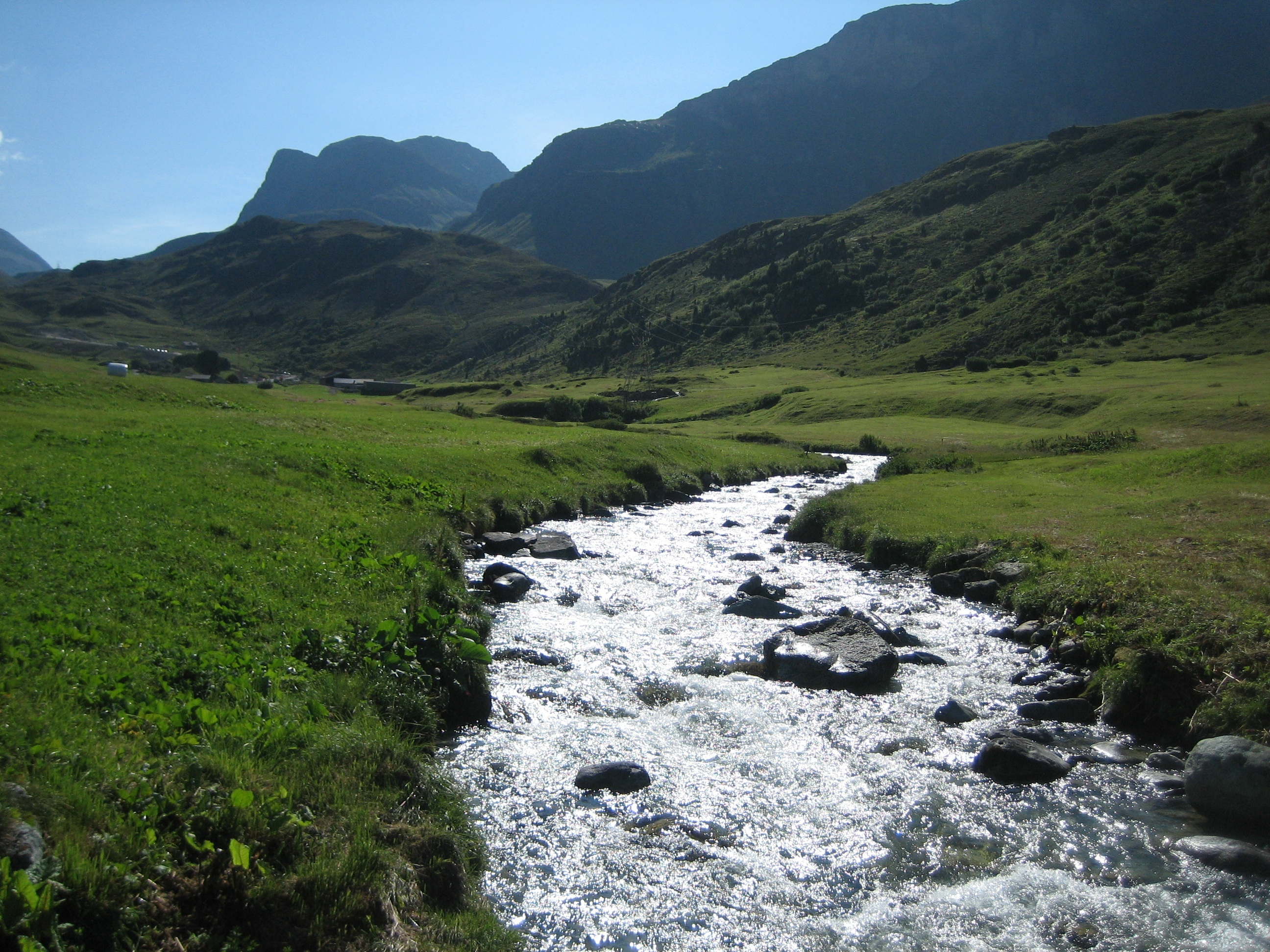
- Gelgia (Julia) in the Julier Pass

Location
- Country: Switzerland

Physical characteristics
- Source
  - location: below Piz d'Agnel, Graubünden, Switzerland
  - elevation: 2,835 m (9,301 ft)
- Mouth: Albula (river)
  - location: Tiefencastel
  - coordinates: 46°33′51″N 9°37′16″E
  - elevation: 833 m (2,733 ft)
- Length: 37 km (23 mi)

Basin features
- Progression: Albula→ Hinterrhein→ Rhine→ North Sea

The Gelgia (romansh, also Gülgia; German: Julia, Italian: Giulia) is a 37-kilometre (23 mi) river in canton of Graubünden, Switzerland. Its origin is north of the Julier Pass. It origins below the Piz d'Agnel (3,204 metres (10,512 ft)) in the valley of the same name, Val d'Agnel, flows south for 4 km and then turns west just about 900 m below the Julier Pass for about 5 km, where it turns finally north to run through the valley Surses, defined by the river. The first village it traverses is Bivio before it enters the artificial reservoir Lai da Marmorera. Later it also traverses the hamlet Mulegns, and the villages Rona, Tinizong, Savognin, and Cunter. The Geglia finally empties into the Albula in the village of Tiefencastel.

== See also ==
- List of rivers of Switzerland
