= Surses =

Sursés
- Municipality
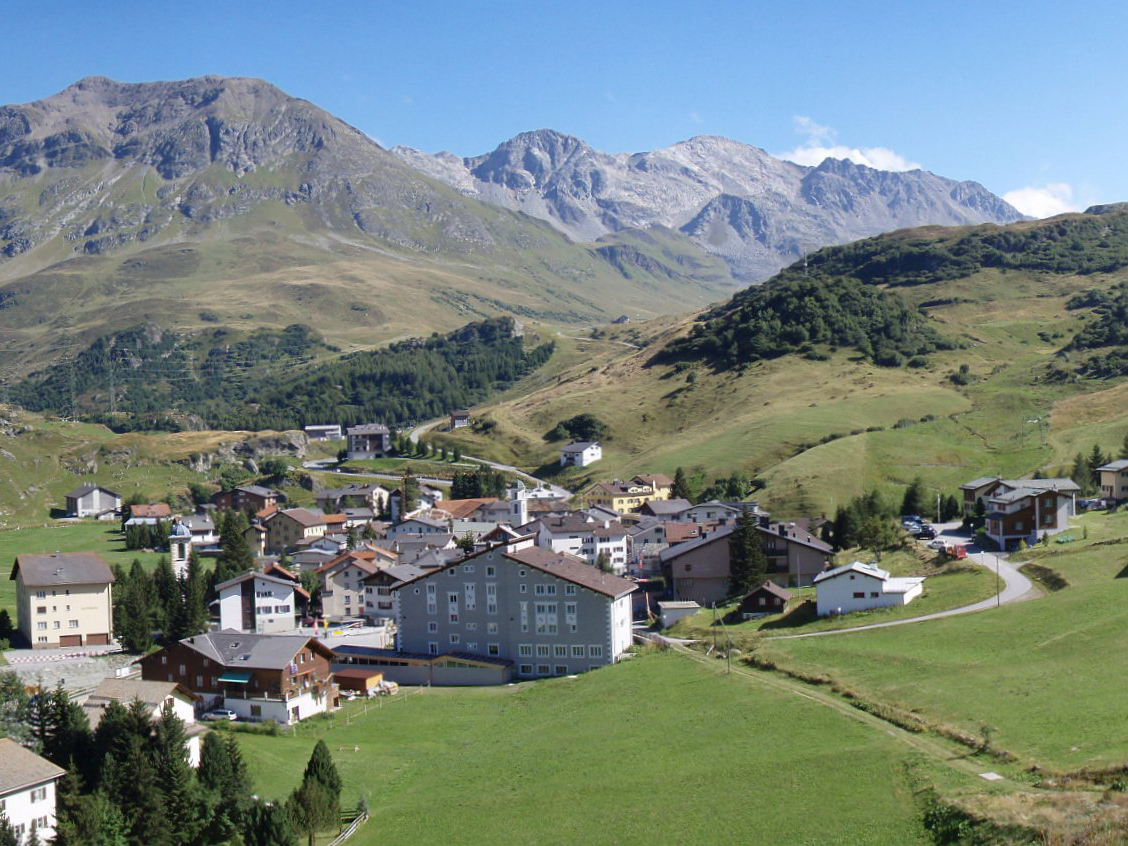
- Bivio village

- Flag Coat of arms
- Location of Sursés
- Location within Switzerland Location within Canton of Grisons
- Coordinates: 46°28′N 9°39′E
- Country: Switzerland
- Canton: Grisons
- District: Albula

Area
  - Total: 76.73 km^{2} (29.63 sq mi)

Population (Dec 2014)
  - Total: 2,425
  - Density: 31.60/km^{2} (81.85/sq mi)
- Time zone: UTC+01:00 (CET)
  - Summer (DST): UTC+02:00 (CEST)
- Postal code: 7452-57; 7460-3
- SFOS number: 3543
- ISO 3166 code: CH-GR
- Localities: Savognin, Bivio, Tinizong, Cunter, Rona, Salouf, Riom, Parsonz, Mulegns, Sur, Radons, Marmorera, Munter, Faller, Panaglia, Tigignas
- Surrounded by: Avers, Bever, Sils im Engadin/Segl, Silvaplana, Soglio, Stampa,
- Website: www.surses.ch

Sursés (German: Oberhalbstein) is a valley, defined by the river Gelgia, and since 2016 also a municipality in the Albula Region of the Swiss canton of Graubünden. On 1 January 2016 the former municipalities of Bivio, Cunter, Marmorera, Mulegns, Riom-Parsonz, Salouf, Savognin, Sur and Tinizong-Rona merged to form the new municipality of Sursés.

== History ==
=== Bivio ===
Bivio is first mentioned about 840 as de stabulo Bivio. At one time it was known, in German, as Stallen and until 1895/1903 by its Italian name Stalla.

=== Cunter ===
Cunter is first mentioned in 1370 as Contra.

=== Marmorera ===
Marmorera is first mentioned about 840 as ad Marmoraria. The old village was destroyed and flooded when the Marmorera dam was constructed. The current village was built above Lai da Marmorera.

=== Mulegns ===
Near Mulegns, around 600-500 BC, a copper mine and smelter were built in the Val Faller (Faller valley). The village was founded by a Walser group during the 15th Century. It was first mentioned in 1521.

=== Riom-Parsonz ===
Riom-Parsonz was created from the 1979 union of the municipalities of Parsonz and Riom. Riom is first mentioned in 841 as villa Riamio and in German it was known as Reams. The other half, Parsonz is first mentioned in 1156 as Presan and in German it was known as Präsanz.

Riom was inhabited during the Roman era, from the 1st century through the 4th. During this time, it was a mansio or way-station along the Julier Pass road. After the Fall of the Western Roman Empire, farmers and herders continued to live here during the Early Middle Ages. In 840 it was personally owned by the king of Raetia Curiensis and a local administrative center.

=== Salouf ===
Salouf is first mentioned in 1160 as Salugo.

=== Savognin ===
Savognin is first mentioned in 1154 as Sueningin.

An important Bronze Age settlement is located on the Padnal hill to the south of town. In multiple excavations, many discoveries have been made, mostly from the period between 1800 and 1000 B.C.

At least since the time of the Romans, important travel routes have passed through the Julier and Septimer passes. Savognin came into the possession of the Bishops of Chur in the 13th century. As part of the court of Oberhalbstein, for which Savognin acted as principal town and rural area, the town became a member of the League of God's House. After its sale in 1552, the valley attained full sovereignty as part of the Free State of the Three Leagues.

The cattle industry and traffic through the passes formed the economic framework of the community since the Middle Ages. Periods of increase, for example, after Mount Crap Ses was blown up in 1777, or when the Julier Road was improved between 1820 and 1840, were always followed by periods of decrease, most recently from too much competition after the opening of the Gotthardbahn in 1882. At this stage Savognin was thrown back to being a peasants' village, and missed the next connection to the development of tourism. Jenische families were granted citizenship in the middle of the 19th century, as part of the Law for the fight against Homelessness. The ascent to foreign vacation destination began only in the 1960s, with the construction of hotels, vacation apartments and aerial ropeways (Piz Martegnas); the village was changing.

=== Sur ===
The nearby Spliatsch Castle was built around the beginning of the 13th Century by the Marmels family. In 1663 the Capuchin friars built the baroque church of S. Catregna (Katharina) on the ruined foundations of the medieval church of St. Bartholomäus. Today this church, together with the villages of Mulegns and Marmorera form a parish. Until 1850 Sur was part of the municipality of Oberhalbstein in the League of God's House. Before the construction of the Rhaetian Railway Sur was a cluster of farm houses and a major side industry was providing guides to travellers.

=== Tinizong-Rona ===
Tinizong is mentioned during the Nervan–Antonine dynasty (96 to 192) of the Roman Empire as Tinetione, a station on the Roman Septimer Pass route. Rona is first mentioned in 1330 as Rouenam. In 1377 it was mentioned as Rouvena, and in 1412 as Rofna.

== Geography ==
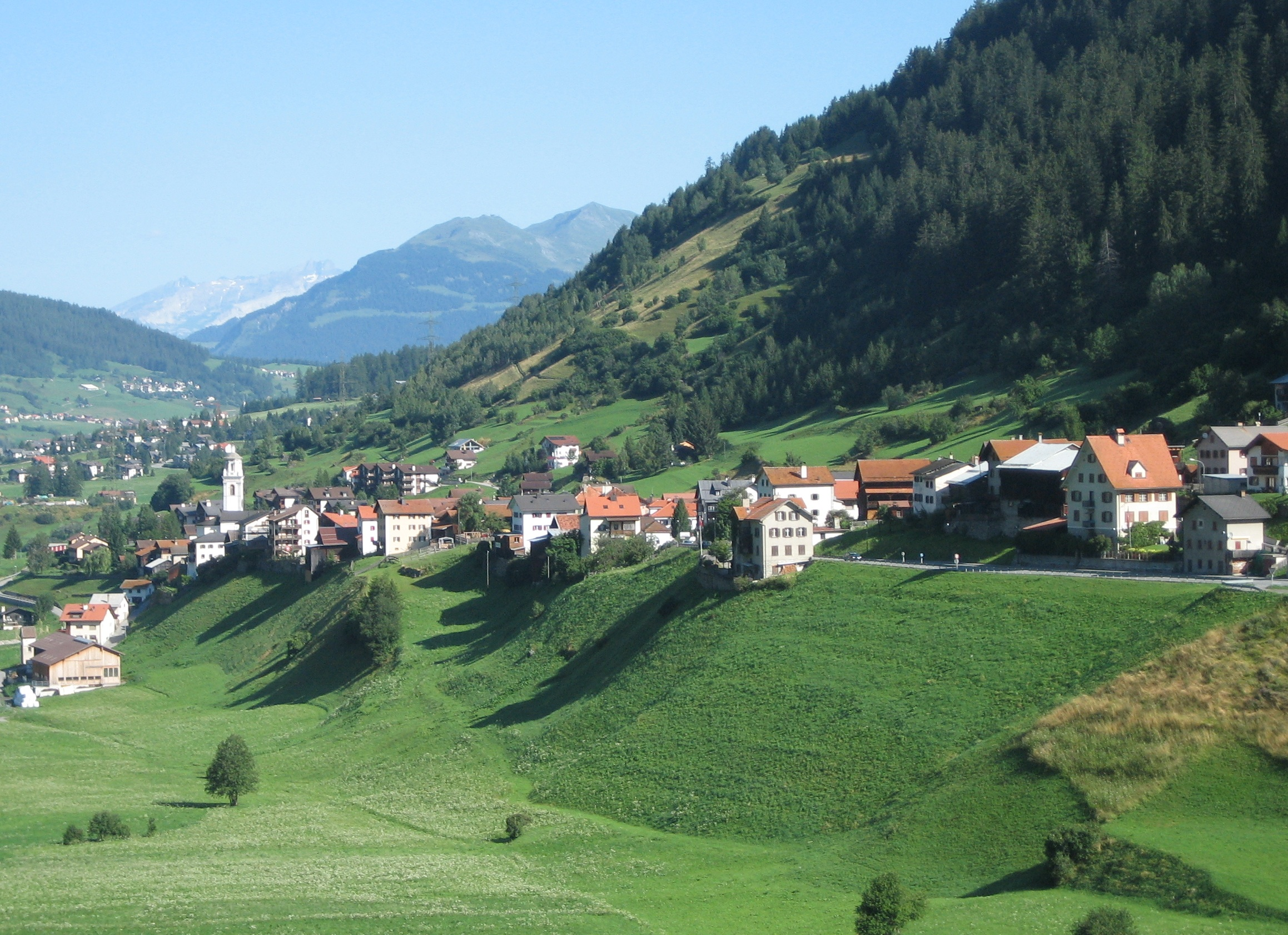
Tinizong village

Aerial view by Walter Mittelholzer (1928)

Occupying the whole valley, Sursés has an area of 323.77 km^{2} (125.01 sq mi). The lake Lai Lung is within its boundaries.

== Demographics ==
Sursés has a population (as of 31 December 2020) of 2,377.

== Population ==
The historical population is given in the following chart:

== Weather ==
The Bivio weather station has an average of 132.1 days of rain per year and on average receives 1,198 mm (47.2 in) of precipitation. The wettest month is August during which time Bivio receives an average of 138 mm (5.4 in) of precipitation. During this month there is precipitation for an average of 11.9 days. The month with the most days of precipitation is May, with an average of 13.1, but with only 125 mm (4.9 in) of precipitation. The driest month of the year is February with an average of 56 mm (2.2 in) of precipitation over 11.9 days.

The Savognin weather station has an average of 104.3 days of rain per year and on average receives 917 mm (36.1 in) of precipitation. The wettest month is August during which time Savognin receives an average of 117 mm (4.6 in) of precipitation. During this month there is precipitation for an average of 11.8 days. The driest month of the year is February with an average of 42 mm (1.7 in) of precipitation over 11.8 days.

== Heritage sites of national significance ==
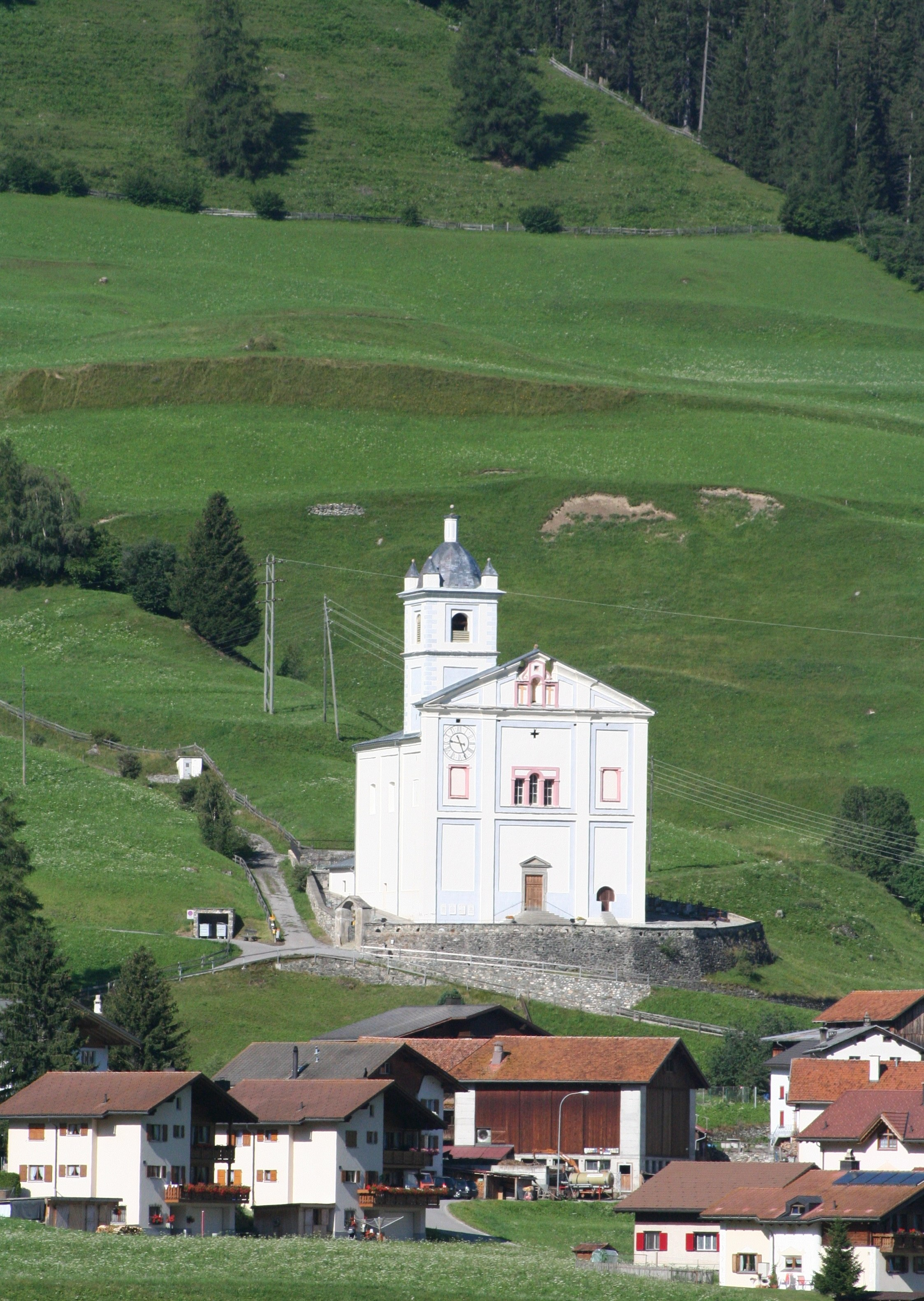
Son Mitgel Church

The archeological discovery of a Roman mountain shrine in the Julier pass near Bivio, Riom Castle in Riom-Parsonz, the Chasa Fontana No. 26 in Salouf, the Son Martegn Church and the Padnal/Mot la Cresta (a Bronze Age settlement) in Savognin, the Church of S. Plasch (St. Blasius) and the Chasa Cresta Nr. 5 in Tinizong-Rona are listed as Swiss heritage sites of national significance.

The Church of Son Martegn, built in 1677 in the Central Form style, with a cross-shaped base. It has a monumental fresco painted in 1681 by Carlo Nuvolone from Milan.

The Church of S. Plasch was first mentioned in 1180. In 1512 the side altars were rebuilt. In 1663 it was rebuilt from the original gothic style by the Capuchin friars.

== Notable residents ==
- The Italian painter Giovanni Segantini lived in Savognin between 1886 and 1894, and developed his style there. He is famous for his landscapes with Mounts Piz Curver and Piz Tiossa in the background.
- The Romansh-language poet and priest Alexander Lozza, OFMCap was born here in 1880.
- The Swiss theologian Mauro Jöhri, OFMCap was born here in 1947.

== Trivia ==
The 2007 Swiss mystery film Marmorera was filmed in Marmorera and at the dam reservoir.

== See also ==
- Italian Graubünden
