= Riom Castle =

Castle in the Canton of Graubünden, Switzerland

- Casti da Riom, Raetia Ampla
- Surses
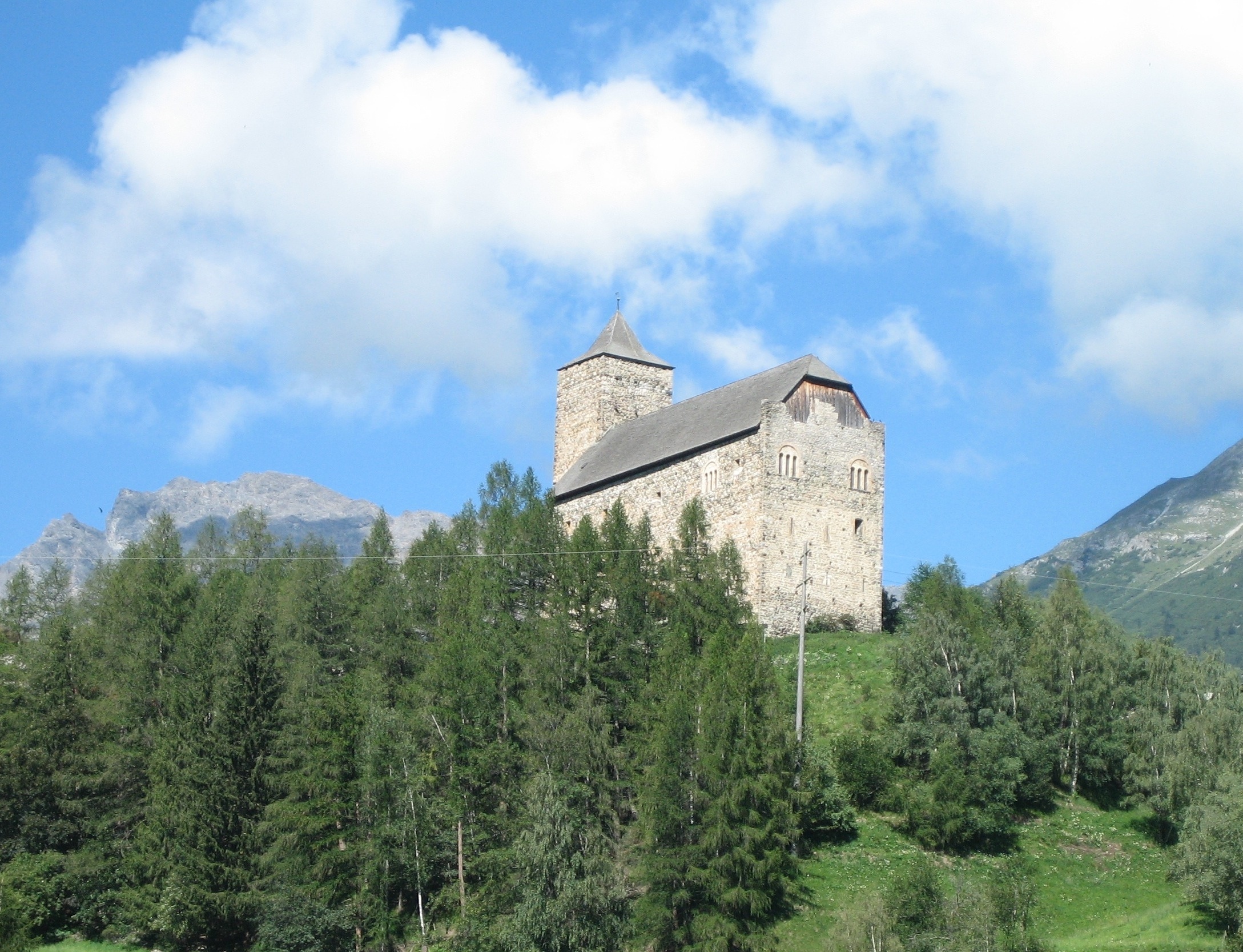
- View of the castle from the south-east

Site information
- Type: motte-and-bailey castle
- Code: CH-GR
- Condition: preserved

Location
- Coordinates: 46°36′33.33″N 9°35′03.61″E
- Height: 1'227 m

Site history
- Built: around 1226

Riom Castle is a castle in the village of Riom-Parsonz (part of the municipality of Surses) of the Canton of Graubünden in Switzerland. It is a Swiss heritage site of national significance.

== History ==
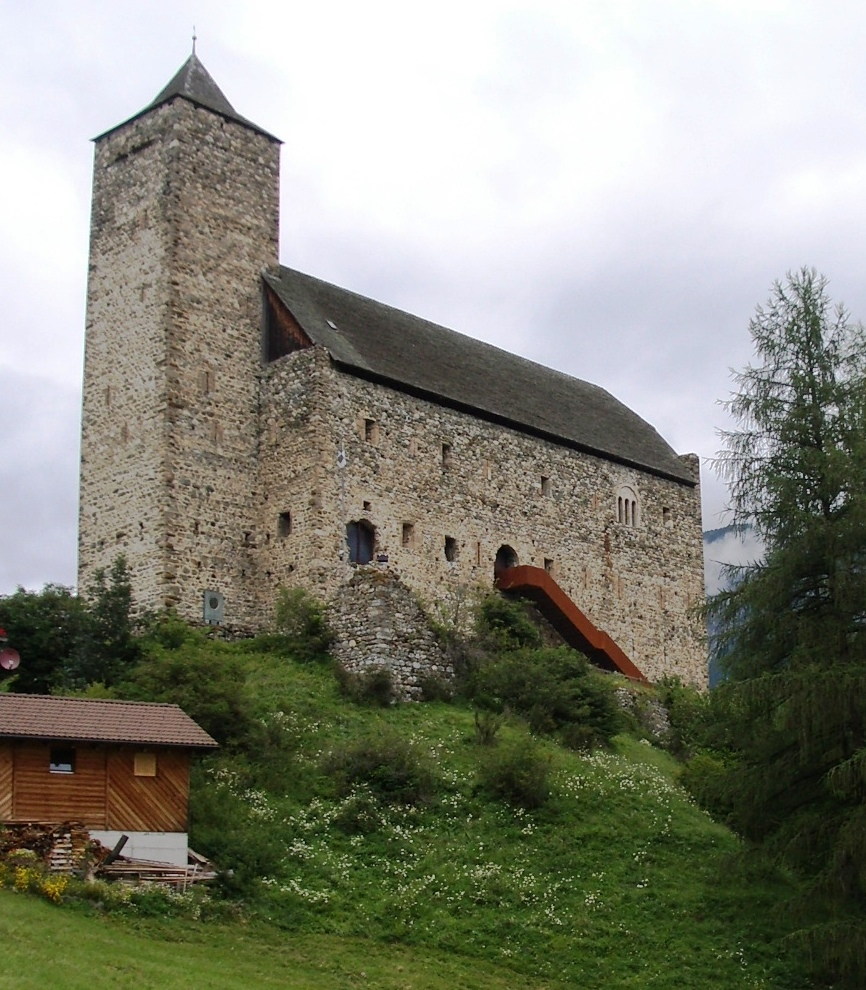
Riom Castle

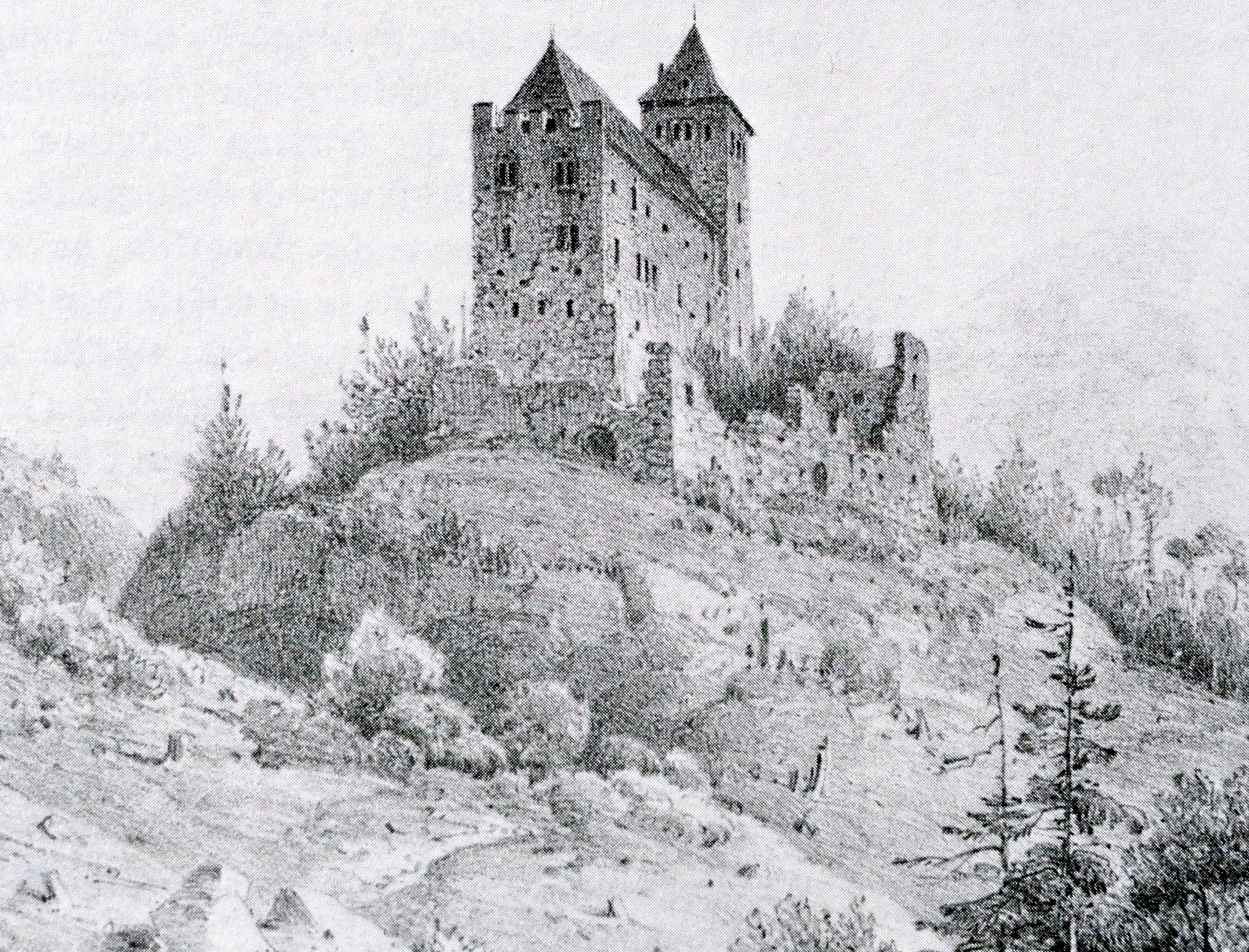
Riom castle in 1800

Aerial video of Riom Castle

Riom was inhabited during the Roman era, from the 1st century through the 4th. During this time, it was a mansio or way-station along the Julier Pass road. After the Fall of the Western Roman Empire, farmers and herders continued to live here during the Early Middle Ages. In 840 it was personally owned by the king of Raetia Curiensis and was a local administrative center as well as the site of major church. The church was given by King Arnulf to a vassal of his named Ruotpert, who in 904 traded it to Lorsch Abbey. Riom and the surrounding lands eventually passed to the Knights of Wangen-Burgeis in the early 13th century and around 1226 they built Riom Castle.

The original castle consisted of a slender, tall bergfried and an attached two-story palas. Not long after, a third story was added to the palas. These buildings were surrounded with a ring wall. The gatehouse was demolished in the past few centuries and no trace of it remains.

The castle and surrounding estates were sold by Berall von Wangen in 1258 to the Bishop of Chur for 300 silver Marks. However, to purchase the estates the Bishop had to put the castle up as collateral to secure a loan from the Freiherr von Vaz. In 1275 the Bishop paid off the loan and made Riom the center of the bailiwick of Oberhalbstein. Tolls and taxes from trade over the Julier and Septimer Passes brought a steady stream of money into the castle. By the early 14th century the Marmels family were the bailiffs of Riom, a post they held until 1426. During the 15th and 16th centuries a number of other noble Graubünden families were bailiffs at Riom. In 1468 Bishop Ortlieb von Brandis angered the League of God's House. They assembled an army, attacked several of the Bishop's estates, including Riom and Greifenstein, and occupied them. The Bishop was forced to ask the city of Zürich to intervene. Zürich negotiated with the League and convinced them to return the castles to the Bishop.

The Ilanzer Article of 1526 eliminated the worldly power of the Bishop, but change came slowly to the valley. In 1552 the communities of Surses bought their freedom from the Bishop, eliminating the need for a bailiff in the castle. Over the following centuries, the castle was used as the meeting place for the Landsgemeinde. The Surses high court continued to meet in the castle and during any witch trials the accused witches were held and tortured in the castle. In 1867 a fire destroyed much of the village, though the castle was preserved. However, the need for wood to rebuild was so dire that the roofs and floors were stripped out of the castle. Without protection from the elements the castle began to deteriorate until the palas and bergfried roofs were replaced in the 20th century.

== Castle site ==
Riom Castle around 1970, before the new palas roof was added

The large three story palas is about 12 by 34 meters (39 ft × 112 ft). After the fire in 1867 the old roof and floors were stripped off the castle, allowing rain in and damaging the walls. Originally the walls were crowned with merlons, in 1977 when a gable roof was added to protect the walls the merlons were removed. The old second story entrance into the palas is located on the south side and is accessible via a wooden stairway. A ground level entrance was added in the 1930s.

The bergfried is a six-story tower that is only 7 m × 7 m (23 ft × 23 ft) at the ground. The tower was never intended to be permanently occupied, instead it was built to defend the castle. The thick walls and narrow firing slits made the interior very cramped. The tower roof was stripped after the 1867 fire and replaced with a new roof in 1936.

In 2006 a theater with 220 seats opened in the palas and every summer is home to the Origen Festival Cultural, a Romansh cultural festival.

== See also ==
- List of castles in Switzerland
