= Tinizong-Rona =

- Former municipality
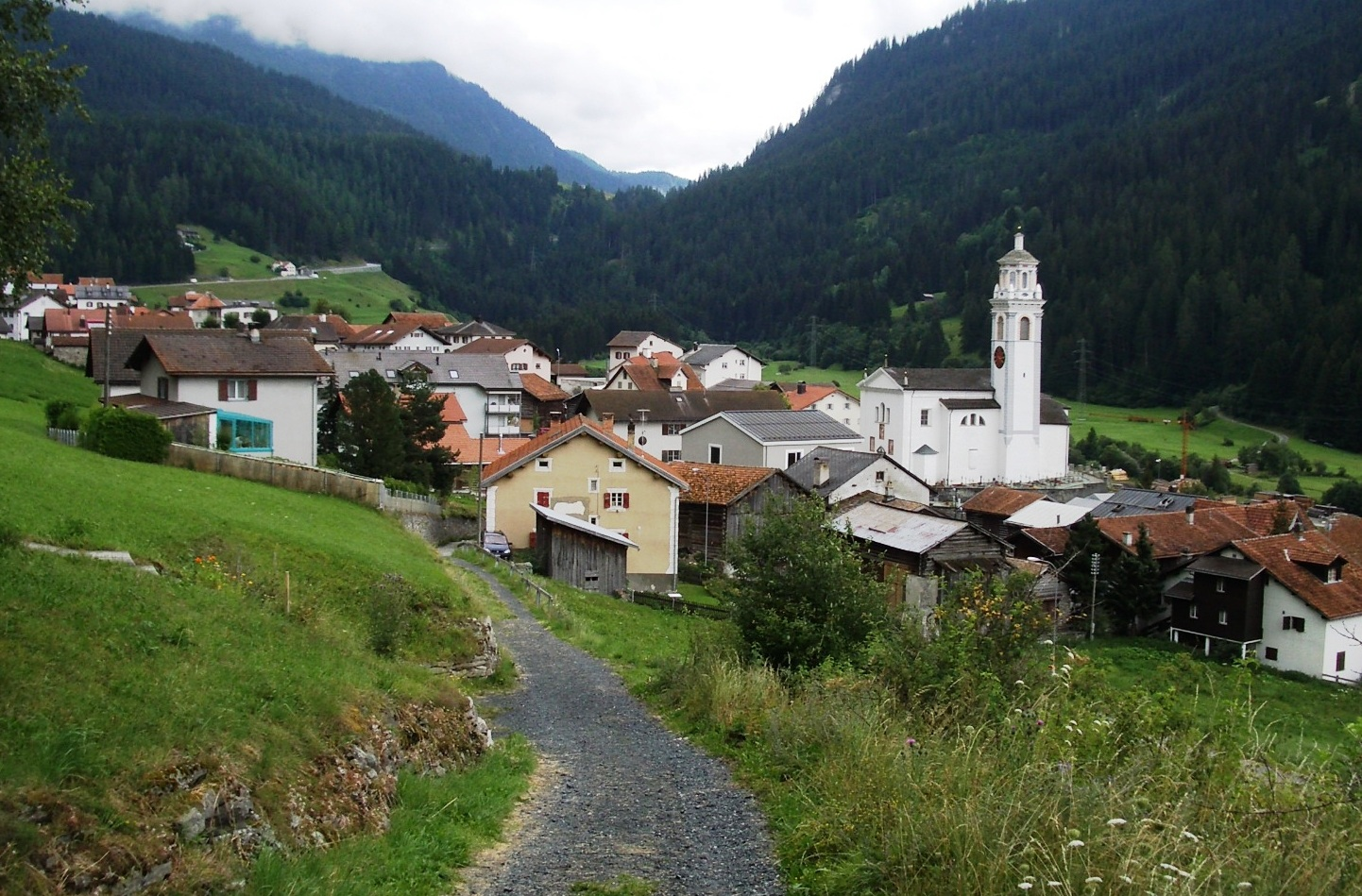

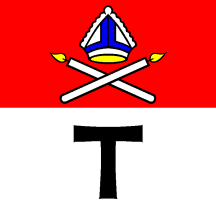
- Flag Coat of arms
- Location of Tinizong-Rona
- Location within Switzerland Location within Canton of Grisons
- Coordinates: 46°35′N 9°37′E
- Country: Switzerland
- Canton: Grisons
- District: Albula

Government
  - Executive: Gemeindevorstand
  - Mayor: Gemeindepräsident

Area
  - Total: 54.30 km^{2} (20.97 sq mi)
- Elevation: 1,232 m (4,042 ft)

Population (Dec 2014)
  - Total: 320
  - Density: 5.9/km^{2} (15/sq mi)
- Time zone: UTC+01:00 (CET)
  - Summer (DST): UTC+02:00 (CEST)
- Postal codes: 7453 Tinizong; 7454 Rona
- SFOS number: 3541
- ISO 3166 code: CH-GR
- Surrounded by: Bergün/Bravuogn, Bever, Filisur, Mulegns, Savognin, Sur
- Website: www.tinizong-rona.ch

Tinizong-Rona is a former municipality in the district of Albula in the Sursés in the canton of Graubünden in Switzerland. It was formed in 1998 from the villages of Tinizong and Rona. The local administration is situated in Tinizong. On 1 January 2016 the former municipalities of Bivio, Cunter, Marmorera, Mulegns, Riom-Parsonz, Salouf, Savognin, Sur and Tinizong-Rona merged to form the new municipality of Surses.

== History ==
Tinizong is mentioned during the Nervan–Antonine dynasty (96 to 192) of the Roman Empire as Tinetione, a station on the Roman Septimer Pass route. Rona is first mentioned in 1330 as Rouenam. In 1377 it was mentioned as Rouvena, and in 1412 as Rofna.

== Geography ==
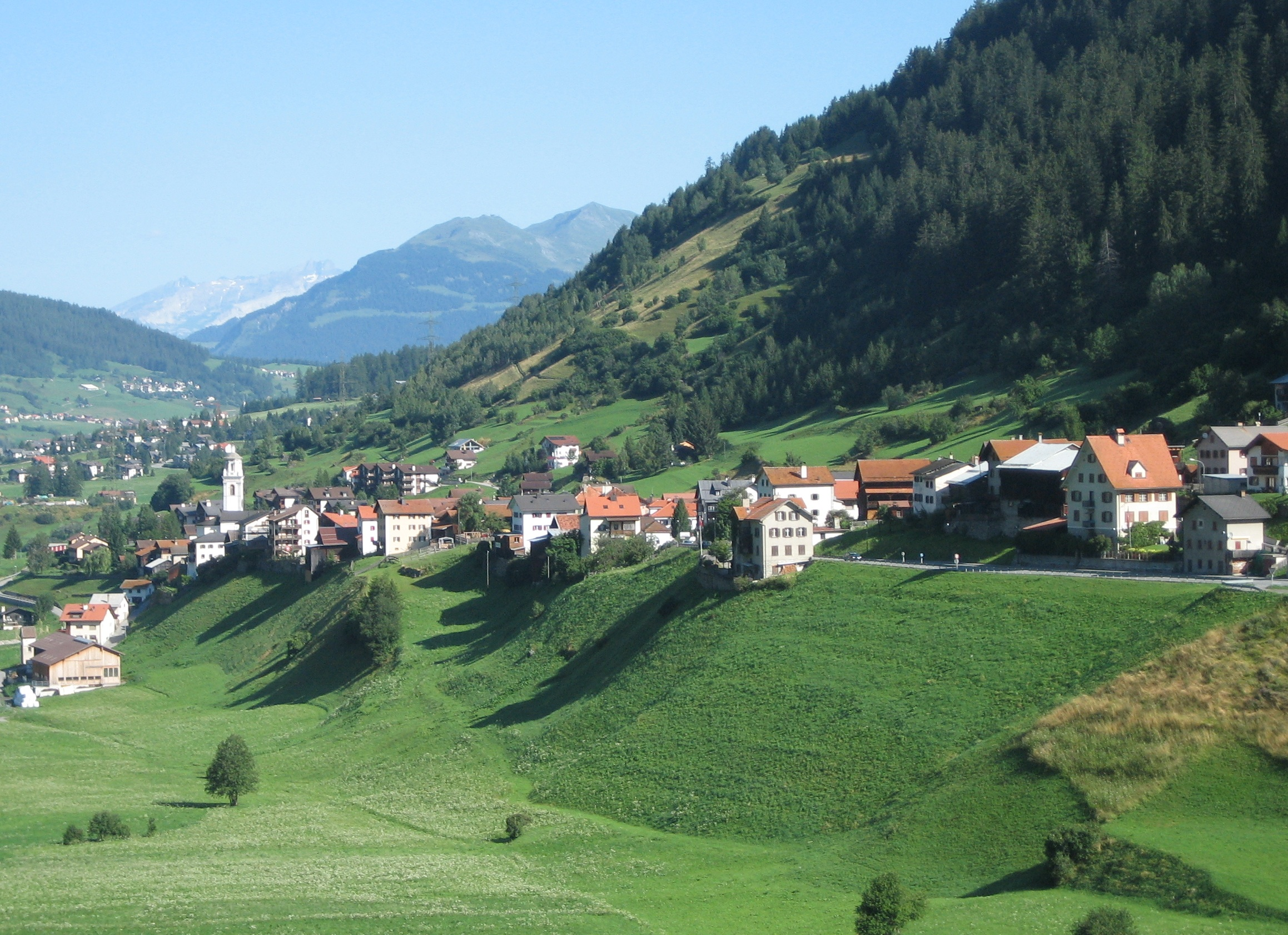
Tinizong village

Tinizong-Rona had an area, as of 2006, of 54.3 km^{2} (21.0 sq mi). Of this area, 32.5% is used for agricultural purposes, while 25.8% is forested. Of the rest of the land, 1.1% is settled (buildings or roads) and the remainder (40.6%) is non-productive (rivers, glaciers or mountains).

The former municipality is located in the sub-district of Sursés, in the Albula district. It is located along the route to the Julier pass. It consists of the villages of Tinizong and Rona. Rona consists of Ober-Rona (Romansh: Ruegnas) on a terrace and Unter-Rona (Romansh: Rieven) along the banks of the Gelgia. Rieven used to be located on the same site as the hamlet of Livizung (the hamlet was destroyed in 1580 by a rock slide), but moved following repeated flooding of the river. In 1998 the municipalities merged to form the municipality of Rona-Tinizong.

== Demographics ==
Tinizong-Rona had a population (as of 2014) of 320. As of 2008, 17.5% of the population was made up of foreign nationals. Over the last 10 years the population has decreased at a rate of -9.1%.

As of 2000, the gender distribution of the population was 50.8% male and 49.2% female. The age distribution, as of 2000, in Tinizong-Rona is; 47 people or 12.7% of the population are between 0 and 9 years old. 29 people or 7.9% are 10 to 14, and 8 people or 2.2% are 15 to 19. Of the adult population, 35 people or 9.5% of the population are between 20 and 29 years old. 45 people or 12.2% are 30 to 39, 63 people or 17.1% are 40 to 49, and 38 people or 10.3% are 50 to 59. The senior population distribution is 42 people or 11.4% of the population are between 60 and 69 years old, 38 people or 10.3% are 70 to 79, there are 19 people or 5.1% who are 80 to 89, and there are 5 people or 1.4% who are 90 to 99.

In the 2007 federal election the most popular party was the CVP which received 42.7% of the vote. The next three most popular parties were the SVP (26.9%), the SPS (18.1%) and the FDP (10.4%).

In Tinizong-Rona about 54.8% of the population (between age 25-64) have completed either non-mandatory upper secondary education or additional higher education (either university or a Fachhochschule).

Tinizong-Rona has an unemployment rate of 1.36%. As of 2005, there were 40 people employed in the primary economic sector and about 15 businesses involved in this sector. 60 people were employed in the secondary sector and there are 9 businesses in this sector. 19 people were employed in the tertiary sector, with 10 businesses in this sector.

The historical population is given in the following table:

year	population
1850	544
1900	496
1950	530
1960	470
1970	409
1980	332
1990	339
2000	369

== Languages ==
Most of the population (as of 2000) speaks Rhaeto-Romance (50.1%), with German being second most common (38.8%) and Portuguese being third ( 4.9%). The official language of the municipality is the Surmiran dialect of the Romansh language.

Languages in Tinizong-Rona
Languages	Census 1980		Census 1990		Census 2000	
Languages	Number	Percent	Number	Percent	Number	Percent
German	57	17.17%	95	28.02%	143	38.75%
Romansh	264	79.52%	227	66.96%	185	50.14%
Italian	7	2.11%	6	1.77%	12	3.25%
Population	332	100%	339	100%	369	100%

== Heritage sites of national significance ==
The Church of S. Plasch (St. Blasius) and the Chasa Cresta Nr. 5 are listed as Swiss heritage sites of national significance.

The church was first mentioned in 1180. In 1512 the side altars were rebuilt. In 1663 it was rebuilt from the original gothic style by the Capuchin friars.
