= Albula District =

Coordinates: 46.6619°N 9.5756°E

Albula District Bezirk Albula District Alvra Distretto di Albula
- District
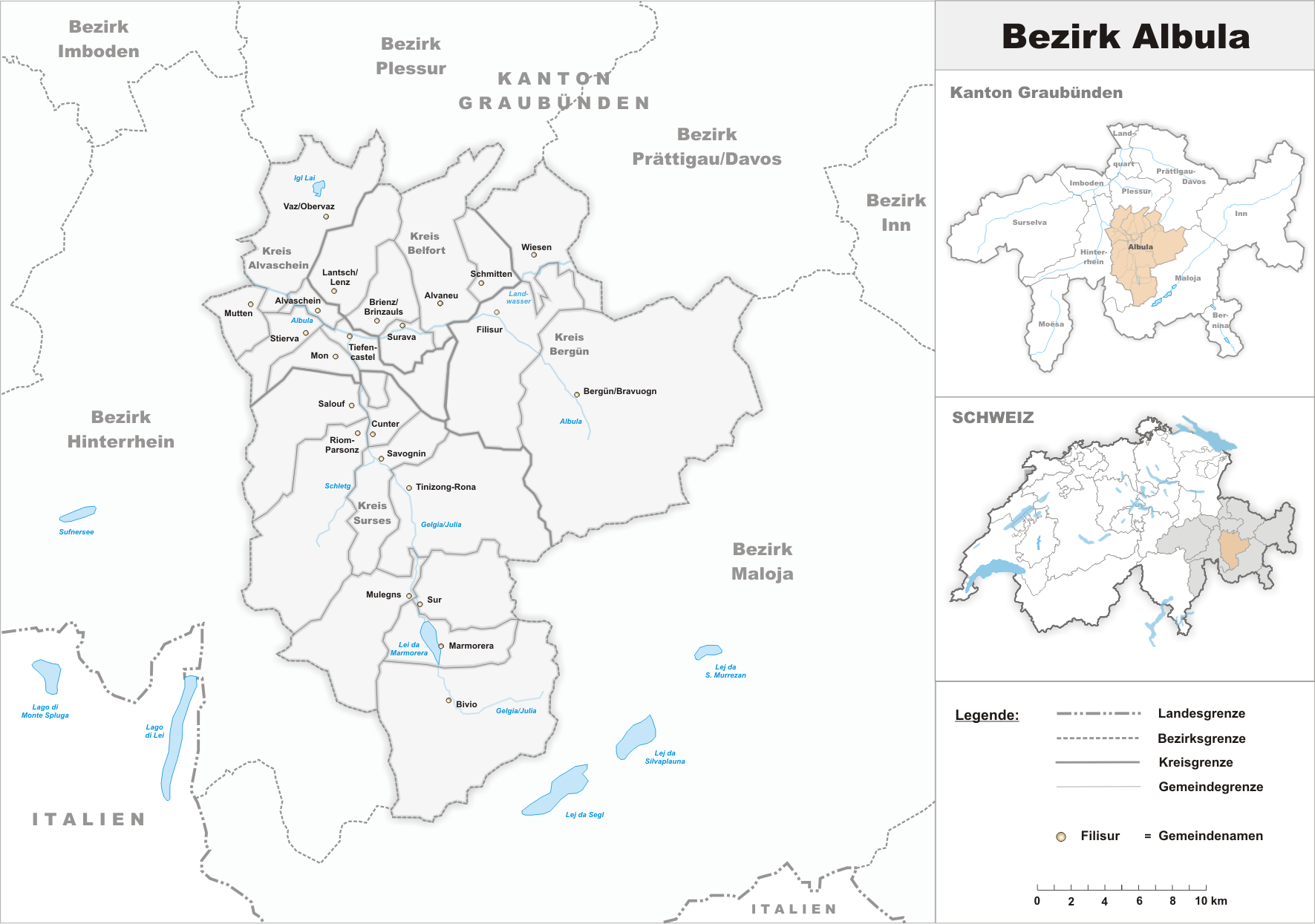
- Country: Switzerland
- Canton: Graubünden
- Capital: Tiefencastel

Area
  - Total: 693.47 km^{2} (267.75 sq mi)

Population (2020)
  - Total: 8,210
  - Density: 11.8/km^{2} (30.7/sq mi)
- Time zone: UTC+1 (CET)
  - Summer (DST): UTC+2 (CEST)
- Municipalities: 8

Albula District was one of the eleven administrative districts in the canton of Graubünden in Switzerland. It had an area of 723.13 km² and had a population of 8,210 in 2015. It was replaced with the Albula Region on 1 January 2017 as part of a reorganization of the Canton.

Albula District consisted of four Kreise (sub-districts) Alvaschein, Belfort, Bergün and Surses, which are formed from a total of 8 municipalities following mergers in 2015 and 2016.

Alvaschein sub-district
| Municipality | Population (31 December 2020) | Area (km²) |
|---|---|---|
| Albula/Alvra | 1,295 | 93.93 |
| Mutten | 61 | 9.9 |
| Vaz/Obervaz | 2,802 | 42.51 |

Belfort sub-district
| Municipality | Population (31 December 2020) | Area (km²) |
|---|---|---|
| Lantsch/Lenz | 560 | 21.82 |
| Schmitten | 222 | 11.32 |

Bergün sub-district
| Municipality | Population (31 December 2020) | Area (km²) |
|---|---|---|
| Bergün/Bravuogn | 480 | 145.76 |
| Filisur | 434 | 44.58 |

Surses sub-district
| Municipality | Population (31 December 2020) | Area (km²) |
|---|---|---|
| Surses | 2,377 | 323.77 |

== Mergers and name changes ==
- On 1 January 2015 the former municipalities of Alvaschein, Mon, Stierva, Tiefencastel, Alvaneu, Brienz/Brinzauls and Surava merged to form the new municipality of Albula/Alvra.
- On 1 January 2016 the former municipalities of Bivio, Cunter, Marmorera, Mulegns, Riom-Parsonz, Salouf, Savognin, Sur and Tinizong-Rona merged to form the new municipality of Surses.

== Languages ==
The official languages of the district of Albula are German and Romansh. In the municipality of Bivio, Italian has given way to German as the official language there.

Languages of Albula District, GR
| Languages | Census 2000 | |
| Languages | Number | Percent |
|---|---|---|
| German | 5,646 | 66.3% |
| Romansh | 2,163 | 25.4% |
| Italian | 263 | 3.1% |
| TOTAL | 8,514 | 100% |
