= Lai Lung =

Lake in the Grisons, Switzerland

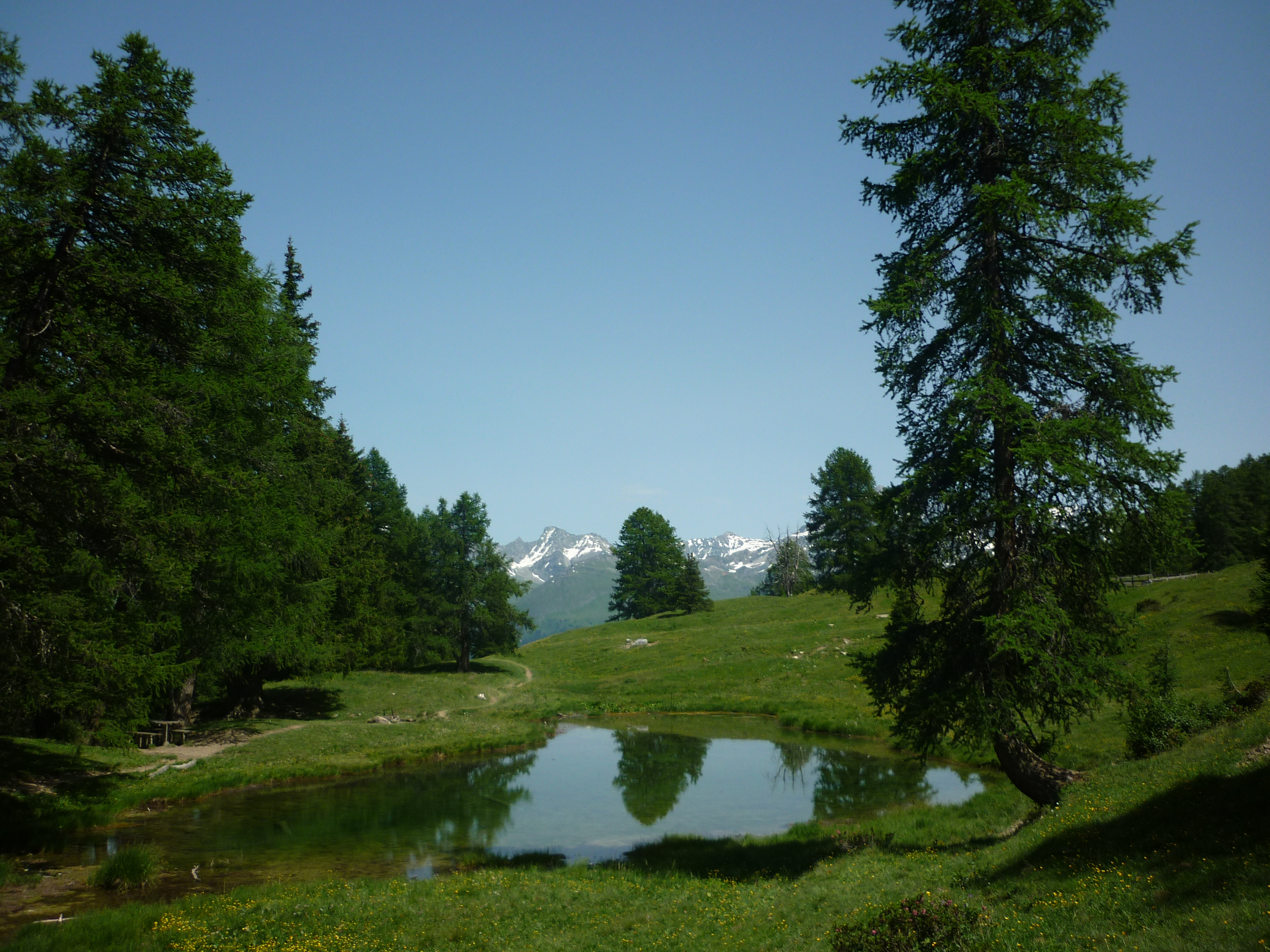

- Location within Canton of Graubünden Location within Switzerland Location within Italy Location within Alps
- Interactive map of Lai Lung
- Location: Riom-Parsonz, Grisons
- Coordinates: 46°35′43″N 9°32′49″E
- Basin countries: Switzerland
- Surface area: 1,000 m^{2} (11,000 sq ft)

Lai Lung is a lake in Switzerland. It is located near Riom-Parsonz in the Canton of the Grisons. According to a 1922 travel guide, its altitude is 6070 feet.
