= Marmorera =

- Former municipality
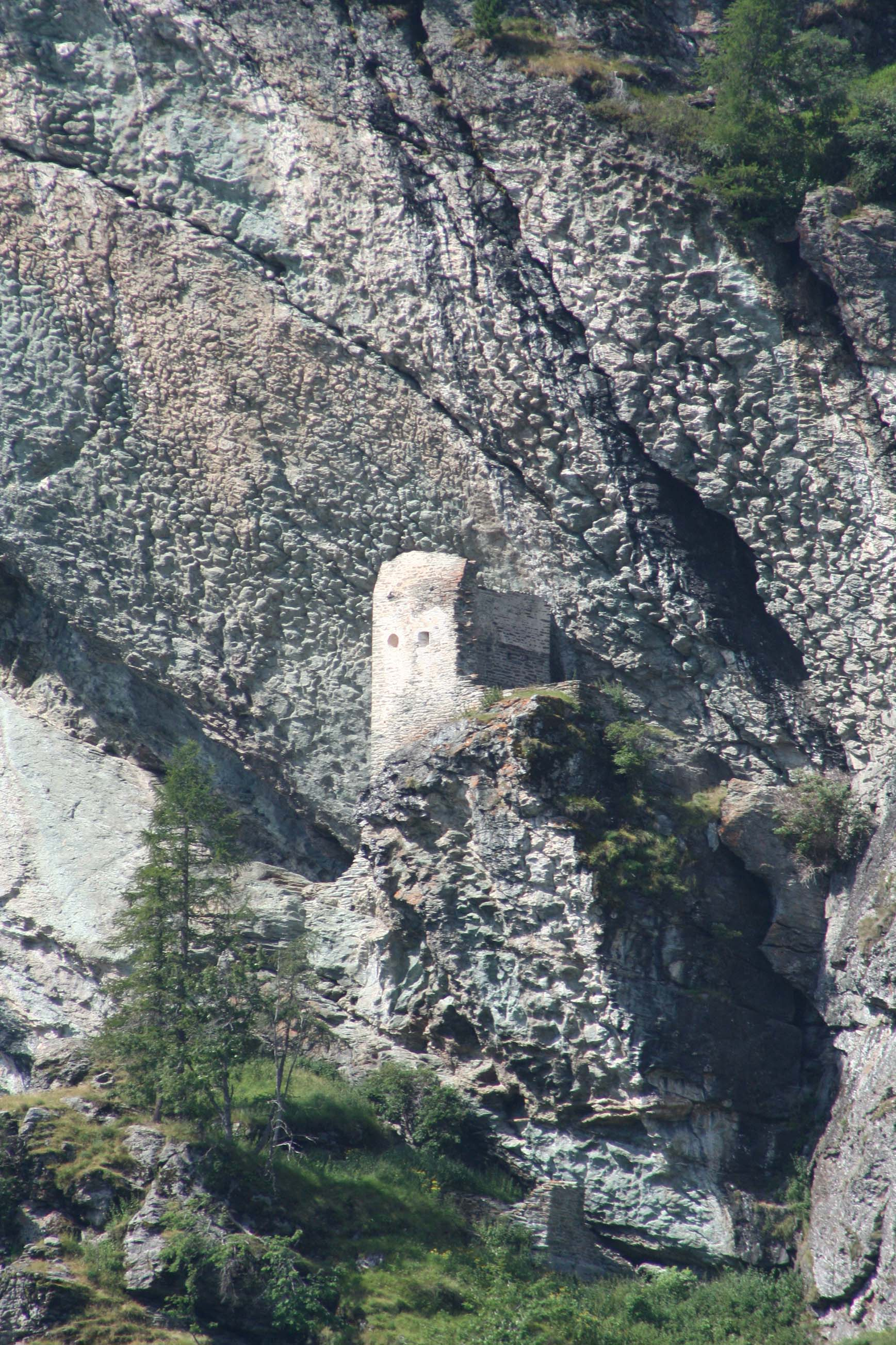
- Ruins of Marmels Castle, located near Marmorrera

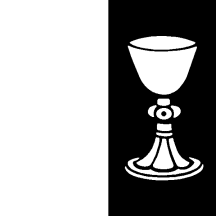
- Flag Coat of arms
- Location of Marmorera
- Location within Switzerland Location within Canton of Graubünden
- Coordinates: 46°30′N 9°39′E
- Country: Switzerland
- Canton: Graubünden
- District: Albula

Area
  - Total: 18.99 km^{2} (7.33 sq mi)
- Elevation: 1,720 m (5,640 ft)

Population (Dec 2014)
  - Total: 31
  - Density: 1.6/km^{2} (4.2/sq mi)
- Time zone: UTC+01:00 (CET)
  - Summer (DST): UTC+02:00 (CEST)
- Postal code: 7456
- SFOS number: 3533
- ISO 3166 code: CH-GR
- Surrounded by: Bever, Bivio, Mulegns, Sur
- Website: https://surses.ch/RM/surses/vischnancas/marmorera.html

Marmorera (German: Marmels) is a village and former municipality in the Sursés in the district of Albula in the canton of Graubünden in Switzerland. On 1 January 2016 the former municipalities of Bivio, Cunter, Marmorera, Mulegns, Riom-Parsonz, Salouf, Savognin, Sur and Tinizong-Rona merged to form the new municipality of Surses.

Until the end of the 19th century, its population was almost exclusively Romansh-speaking. This figure has however since been in decline, with its 2000 census reporting that 57% of the population now declared German as a first language.

The old village was destroyed and flooded when the Marmorera dam was constructed. The current village was built above Lai da Marmorera.

== History ==
Aerial view from 2500 m by Walter Mittelholzer (1925)

Marmorera is first mentioned about 840 as ad Marmoraria.

== Geography ==
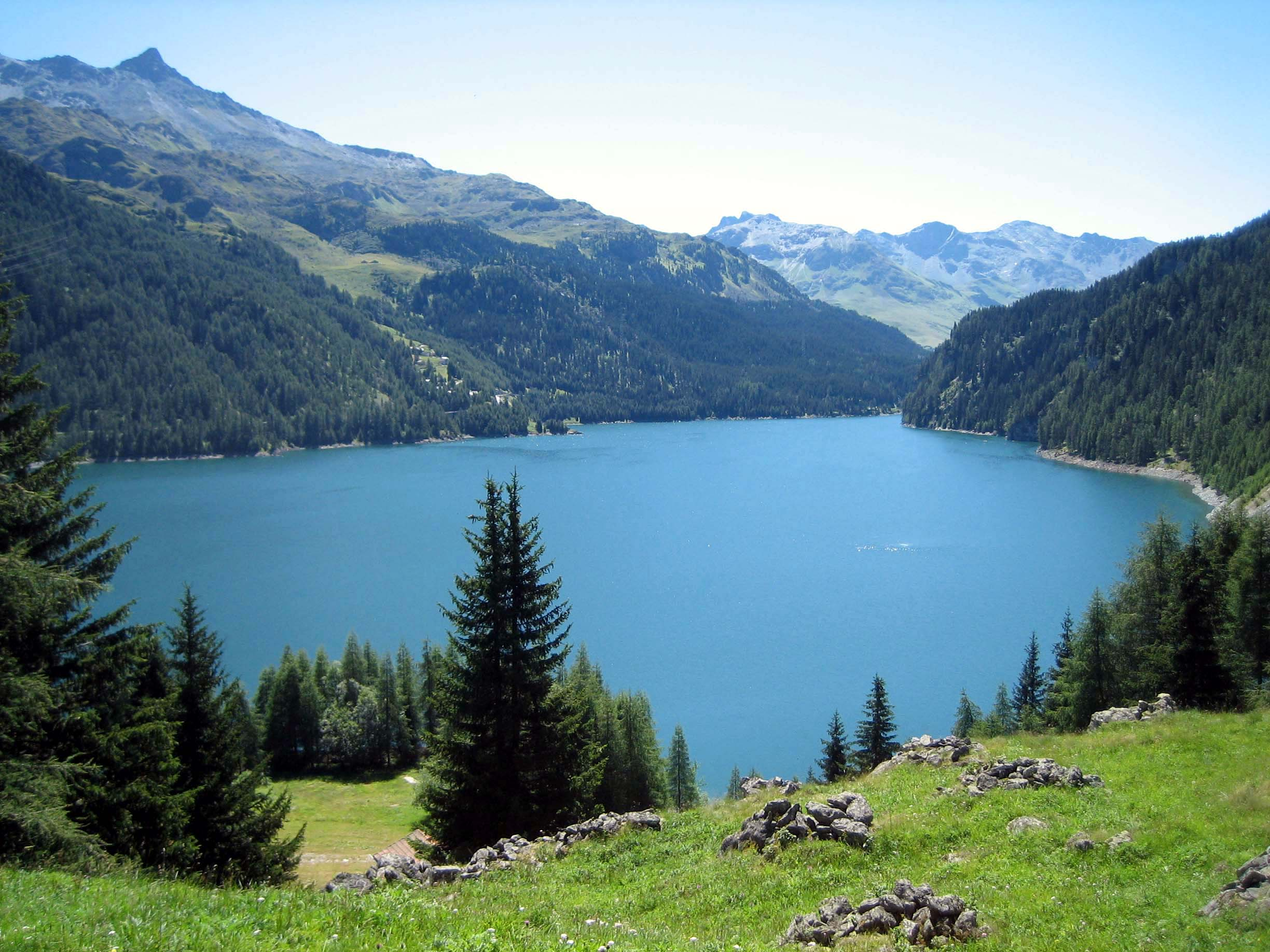
Lai da Marmorera, lake formed behind the Marmorera dam

Marmorera had an area, as of 2006, of 19 km^{2} (7.3 sq mi). Of this area, 35.6% is used for agricultural purposes, while 23% is forested. Of the rest of the land, 1% is settled (buildings or roads) and the remainder (40.4%) is non-productive (rivers, glaciers or mountains).

The former municipality is located in the Surses sub-district of the Albula district. Until 1950 it was a linear village on the Septimer-Julier-Route, but was destroyed and flooded when the Marmorera dam was constructed. Today it is located on the eastern shore of the Lai da Marmorera (Marmorera lake). Until 1902 Marmorera was known as Marmels.

== Demographics ==
Marmorera had a population (as of 2014) of 31. As of 2008, 2.1% of the population was made up of foreign nationals. Over the last 10 years the population has decreased at a rate of -11.1%. Most of the population (as of 2000) speaks German (57.1%), with Romansh being second most common (34.7%) and Italian being third ( 6.1%).

As of 2000, the gender distribution of the population was 47.9% male and 52.1% female. The age distribution, as of 2000, in Marmorera is; 2 people or 4.1% of the population are between 0 and 9 years old. 4 people or 8.2% are 10 to 14, and 4 people or 8.2% are 15 to 19. Of the adult population, 2 people or 4.1% of the population are between 20 and 29 years old. 5 people or 10.2% are 30 to 39, 8 people or 16.3% are 40 to 49, and 9 people or 18.4% are 50 to 59. The senior population distribution is 9 people or 18.4% of the population are between 60 and 69 years old, 4 people or 8.2% are 70 to 79, there are 2 people or 4.1% who are 80 to 89.

In the 2007 federal election the most popular party was the SVP which received 51.2% of the vote. The next three most popular parties were the CVP (20.9%), the SPS (14%) and the FDP (9.3%).

In Marmorera about 85.2% of the population (between age 25-64) have completed either non-mandatory upper secondary education or additional higher education (either university or a Fachhochschule).

Marmorera has an unemployment rate of 0%. As of 2005, there were 2 people employed in the primary economic sector and 1 business involved in this sector. No one is employed in the secondary sector. 7 people are employed in the tertiary sector, with 2 businesses in this sector.

The historical population is given in the following table:

year	population
1850	156
1900	143
1920	100
1941	94
1950	140
1960	28
1970	27
1980	27
1990	38
2000	49
2010	43

== Trivia ==
The 2007 Swiss mystery film Marmorera was filmed in Marmorera and at the dam reservoir.

== Heritage sites of national significance ==
The ruins of old Marmorera are listed as a Swiss heritage sites of national significance.
