= Salouf =

- Former municipality
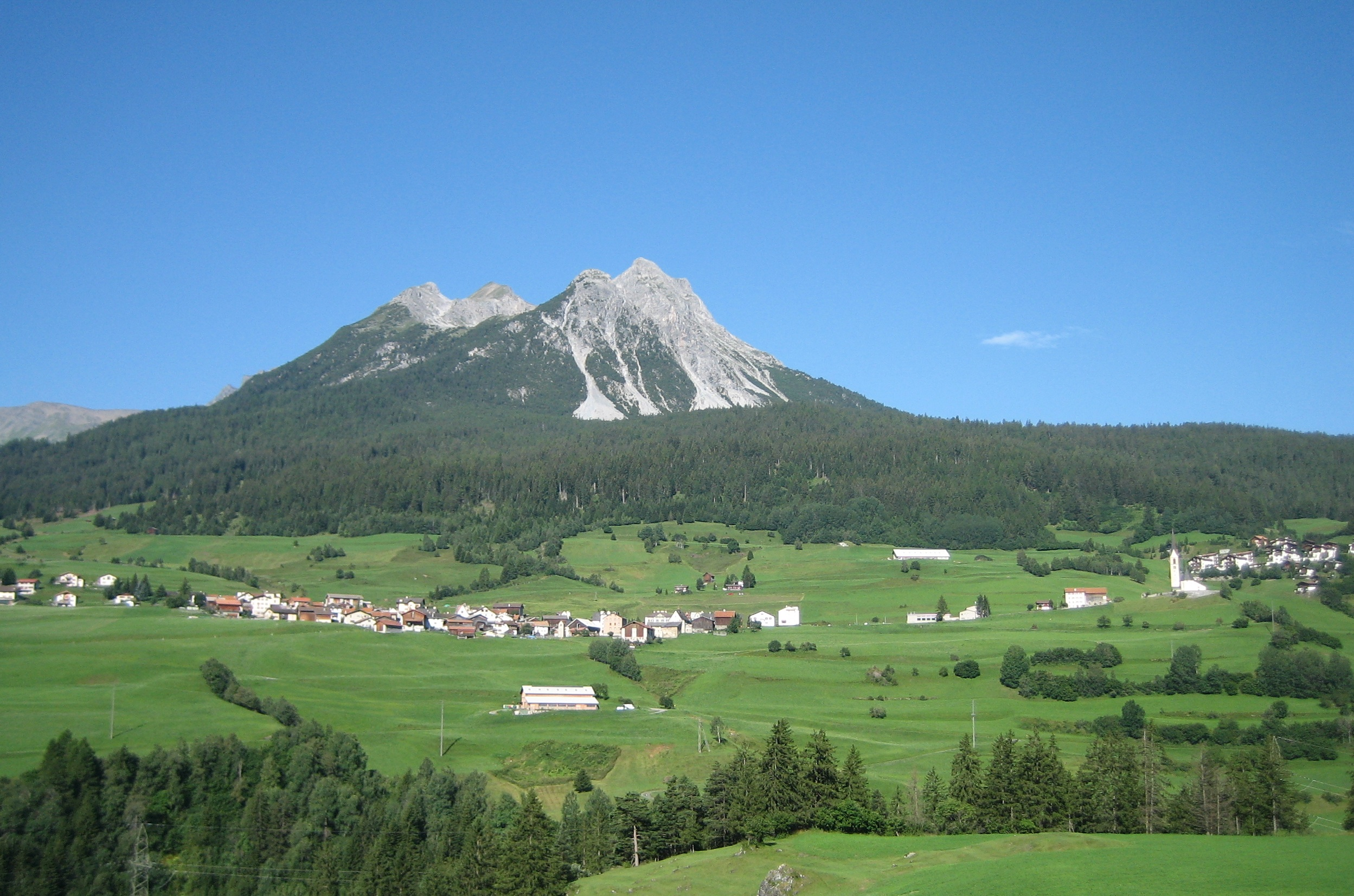

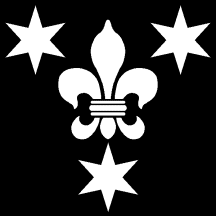
- Flag Coat of arms
- Location of Salouf
- Location within Switzerland Location within Canton of Graubünden
- Coordinates: 46°37′N 9°34′E
- Country: Switzerland
- Canton: Graubünden
- District: Albula

Area
  - Total: 31.41 km^{2} (12.13 sq mi)
- Elevation: 1,258 m (4,127 ft)

Population (Dec 2014)
  - Total: 216
  - Density: 6.88/km^{2} (17.8/sq mi)
- Time zone: UTC+01:00 (CET)
  - Summer (DST): UTC+02:00 (CEST)
- Postal code: 7462
- SFOS number: 3538
- ISO 3166 code: CH-GR
- Surrounded by: Andeer, Ferrera, Cunter, Mon, Pignia, Riom-Parsonz, Stierva, Zillis-Reischen
- Website: https://surses.ch/RM/surses/vischnancas/salouf.html

Salouf (until 1943 officially called Salux) is a village and former municipality in the Sursés in the district of Albula in the canton of Graubünden in Switzerland. On 1 January 2016 the former municipalities of Bivio, Cunter, Marmorera, Mulegns, Riom-Parsonz, Salouf, Savognin, Sur and Tinizong-Rona merged to form the new municipality of Surses.

The population is predominantly Romansh-speaking.

== Coat of arms ==
Salouf's coat of arms depicts a shield with a black background, in the middle a white fleur-de-lys. In each corner and at the bottom is one six pointed silver star. The design is from the shield of Benedict Fontana (a hero of Graubünden) who lived in Salouf.

== History ==
Salouf is first mentioned in 1160 as Salugo. Salouf is the hometown of legendary Romansh fighter Benedikt Fontana, who died in 1499.

== Geography ==
Salouf had an area, as of 2006, of 31.4 km^{2} (12.1 sq mi). Of this area, 42.5% is used for agricultural purposes, while 28.2% is forested. Of the rest of the land, 1.2% is settled (buildings or roads) and the remainder (28.1%) is non-productive (rivers, glaciers or mountains).

The former municipality is located the Surses sub-district of the Albula district. The village lies on a ledge on the east side of Piz Toissa (2,657 meters (8,717 ft)). It consists of the village of Salouf and the hamlets of Mulegn und Del. Until 1943 Salouf was known as Salux.

== Demographics ==
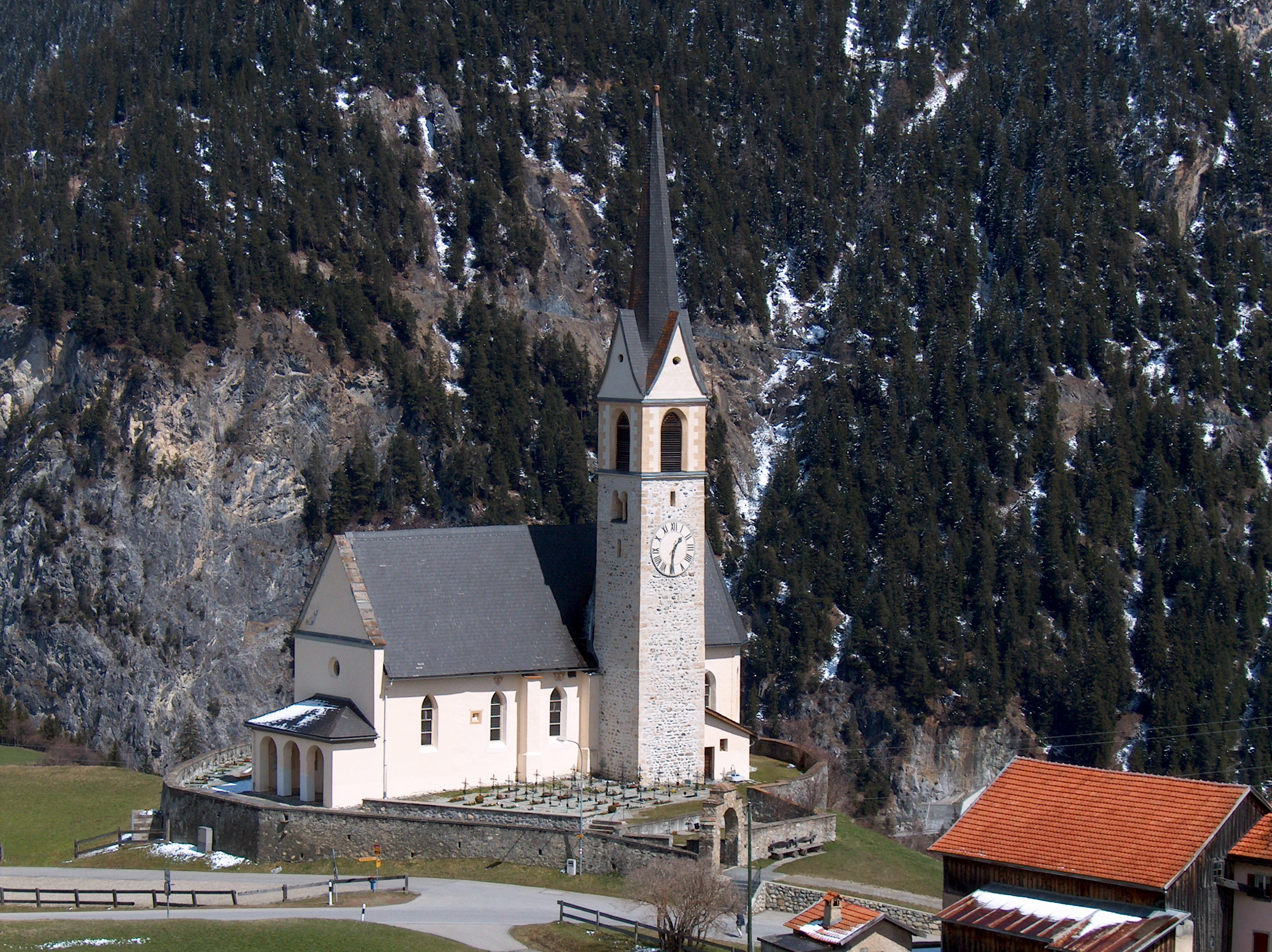
St. George's church in Salouf

Salouf had a population (as of 2014) of 216. As of 2008, about 1.9% of the population was made up of foreign nationals. Over the last 10 years the population has decreased at a rate of -3.2%.

As of 2000, the gender distribution of the population was 48.8% male and 51.2% female. The age distribution, as of 2000, in Salouf is; 7 people or 19.4% of the population are between 0 and 9 years old. 2 people or 5.6% are 10 to 14, and 2 people or 5.6% are 15 to 19. Of the adult population, no one is between 20 and 29 years old. 6 people or 16.7% are 30 to 39, 6 people or 16.7% are 40 to 49, and 3 people or 8.3% are 50 to 59. The senior population distribution is 3 people or 8.3% of the population are between 60 and 69 years old, 5 people or 13.9% are 70 to 79, there is 1 person or 2.8% who is 80 to 89, and 1 person or 2.8% who is 90 to 99.

In the 2007 federal election the most popular party was the CVP which received 40.8% of the vote. The next three most popular parties were the SVP (25.6%), the SPS (16.4%) and the FDP (14.6%).

In Salouf about 69.5% of the population (between age 25-64) have completed either non-mandatory upper secondary education or additional higher education (either university or a Fachhochschule).

Salouf has an unemployment rate of 0.57%. As of 2005, there were 39 people employed in the primary economic sector and about 15 businesses involved in this sector. 40 people are employed in the secondary sector and there are 5 businesses in this sector. 32 people are employed in the tertiary sector, with 7 businesses in this sector.

The historical population is given in the following table:

| year | population |
|---|---|
| 1850 | 413 |
| 1900 | 287 |
| 1950 | 289 |
| 1960 | 233 |
| 1970 | 206 |
| 1980 | 157 |
| 1990 | 185 |
| 2000 | 280 |
| 2010 | 218 |

== Languages ==
The main language of the local people is the Surmiran dialect of Romansh. Its use has declined in recent decades, though to a lesser degree than in neighbouring communities. In 1880 it was 99.1% and 88.54% in 1980. as of 2000, most of the population still speaks Rhaeto-Romance (77.6%), with German being second most common (19.5%) and Portuguese being third ( 1.5%).

=== Languages in Salouf ===
Languages in Salouf
| Languages | Census 1980 | | Census 1990 | | Census 2000 | |
| Languages | Number | Percent | Number | Percent | Number | Percent |
|---|---|---|---|---|---|---|
| German | 13 | 8.28% | 24 | 12.97% | 40 | 19.51% |
| Romanish | 139 | 88.54% | 152 | 82.16% | 159 | 77.56% |
| Italian | 4 | 2.55% | 4 | 2.16% | 2 | 0.98% |
| Population | 157 | 100% | 185 | 100% | 205 | 100% |

== Heritage sites of national significance ==
The Tgesa Fontana or Hotel Fontana is listed as a Swiss heritage sites of national significance.
