= Sur, Switzerland =

Sur
- Former municipality
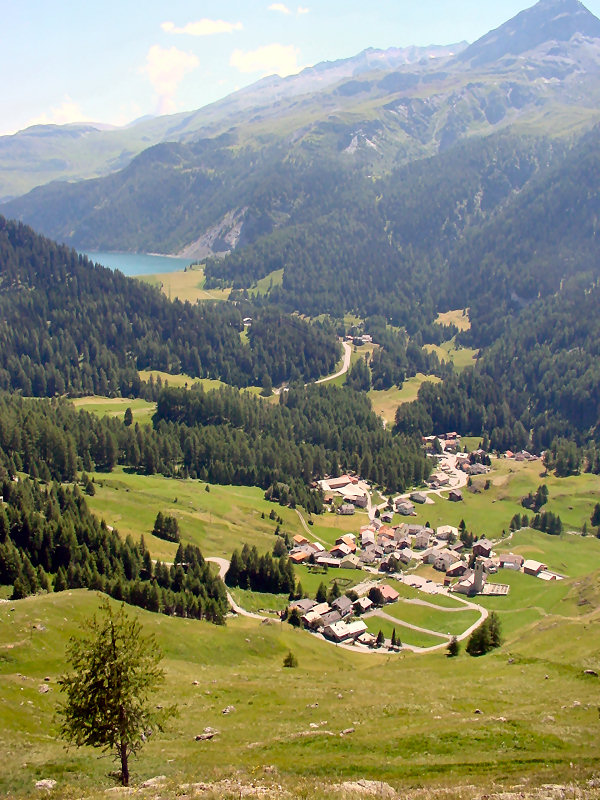

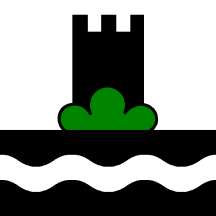
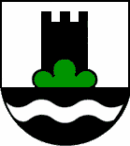
- Flag Coat of arms
- Location of Sur
- Location within Switzerland Location within Canton of Graubünden
- Coordinates: 46°31′N 9°37′E
- Country: Switzerland
- Canton: Graubünden
- District: Albula

Area
  - Total: 23.18 km^{2} (8.95 sq mi)
- Elevation: 1,530 m (5,020 ft)

Population (Dec 2014)
  - Total: 68
  - Density: 2.9/km^{2} (7.6/sq mi)
- Time zone: UTC+01:00 (CET)
  - Summer (DST): UTC+02:00 (CEST)
- Postal code: 7456
- SFOS number: 3540
- ISO 3166 code: CH-GR
- Surrounded by: Bever, Bivio, Marmorera, Mulegns, Tinizong-Rona
- Website: https://surses.ch/RM/surses/vischnancas/sur.html

Sur (Romansh: Sour) is a village and former municipality in the Sursés in the district of Albula in the canton of Graubünden in Switzerland. On 1 January 2016 the former municipalities of Bivio, Cunter, Marmorera, Mulegns, Riom-Parsonz, Salouf, Savognin, Sur and Tinizong-Rona merged to form the new municipality of Surses.

The majority of its population are Romansh-speaking (the Surmiran dialect), with the 2000 census reporting that some 75% claimed it as their first language.

== History ==
The nearby Burg Spliatsch was built around the beginning of the 13th Century by the Marmels family. In 1663 the Capuchin friars built the baroque church of S. Catregna (Katharina) on the ruined foundations of the medieval church of St. Bartholomäus. Today this church, together with the villages of Mulegns and Marmorera form a parish. Until 1850 Sur was part of the municipality of Oberhalbstein in the League of God's House. Before the construction of the Rhaetian Railway Sur was a cluster of farm houses and a major side industry was providing guides to travellers.

== Geography ==
Sur had an area, as of 2006, of 23.2 km^{2} (9.0 sq mi). Of this area, 42.5% is used for agricultural purposes, while 13.2% is forested. Of the rest of the land, 0.5% is settled (buildings or roads) and the remainder (43.8%) is non-productive (rivers, glaciers or mountains).

The former municipality is located in the sub-district of Surses of the Albula district. It consists of the hamlets of Furnatsch and Tgacrest as well as four alpine herding camps in Flix.

== Demographics ==
Sur had a population (as of 2014) of 68. As of 2008, 16.7% of the population was made up of foreign nationals. Over the last 10 years the population has decreased at a rate of -4%.

As of 2000, the gender distribution of the population was 46.9% male and 53.1% female. The age distribution, as of 2000, in Sur is; 12 people or 12.9% of the population are between 0 and 9 years old. 5 people or 5.4% are 10 to 14, and people or 0.0% are 15 to 19. Of the adult population, 7 people or 7.5% of the population are between 20 and 29 years old. 15 people or 16.1% are 30 to 39, 7 people or 7.5% are 40 to 49, and 14 people or 15.1% are 50 to 59. The senior population distribution is 14 people or 15.1% of the population are between 60 and 69 years old, 14 people or 15.1% are 70 to 79, there are 3 people or 3.2% who are 80 to 89, and there are 2 people or 2.2% who are 90 to 99.

In the 2007 federal election the most popular party was the SVP which received 35.3% of the vote. The next three most popular parties were the CVP (30.2%), the SPS (25.9%) and the FDP (7.8%).

In Sur about 58.3% of the population (between age 25-64) have completed either non-mandatory upper secondary education or additional higher education (either university or a Fachhochschule).

Sur has an unemployment rate of 1.35%. As of 2005, there were 12 people employed in the primary economic sector and about 4 businesses involved in this sector. 18 people are employed in the secondary sector and there are 2 businesses in this sector. 24 people are employed in the tertiary sector, with 7 businesses in this sector.

The historical population is given in the following table:

year	population
1850	163
1900	178
1950	227
1960	155
1970	122
1980	112
1990	87
2000	93

== Languages ==
Most of the population (as of 2000) speaks Rhaeto-Romance (75.3%), with German being second most common (21.5%) and Italian being third ( 3.2%).

Languages in Sur
Languages	Census 1980		Census 1990		Census 2000	
Languages	Number	Percent	Number	Percent	Number	Percent
German	5	4.46%	12	13.79%	20	21.51%
Romanish	94	83.93%	66	75.86%	70	75.27%
Italian	4	3.57%	5	5.75%	3	3.23%
Population	112	100%	87	100%	93	100%
