= Bivio =

- Former municipality
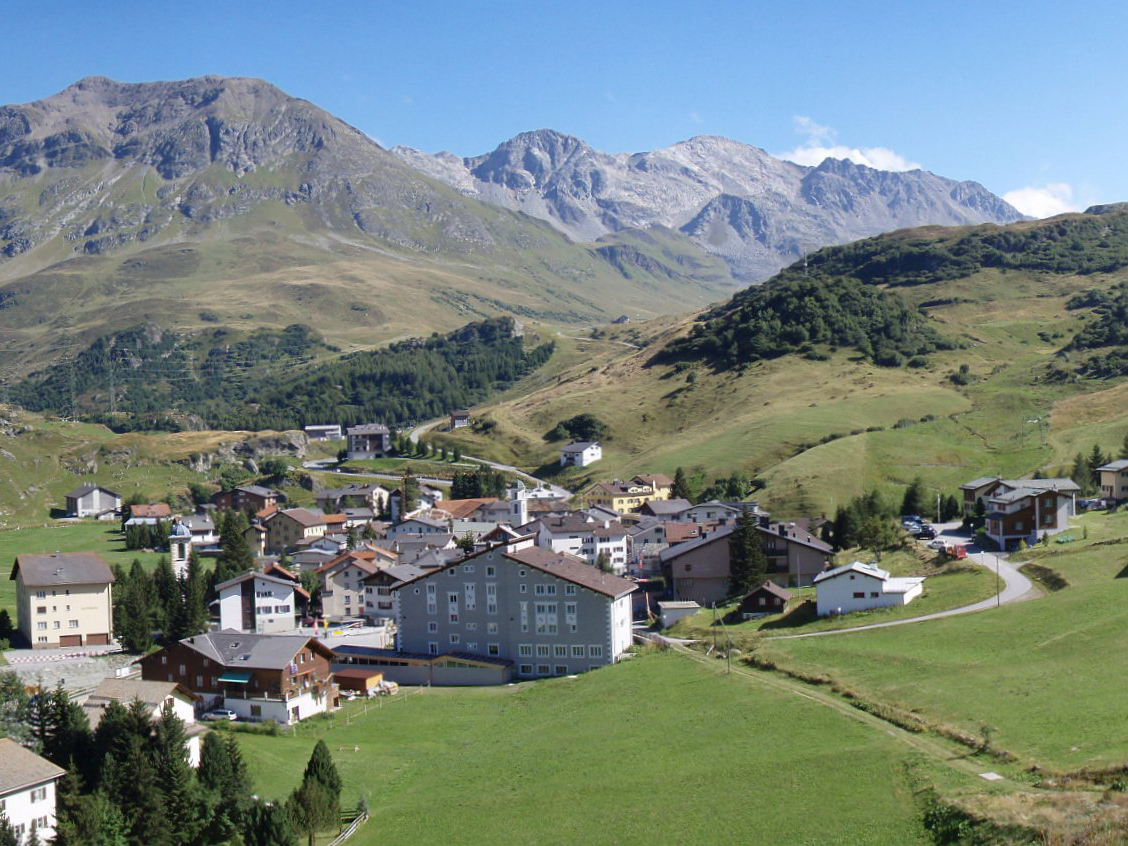

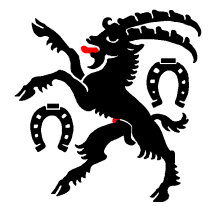
- Flag Coat of arms
- Location of Bivio
- Location within Switzerland Location within Canton of Graubünden
- Coordinates: 46°28′N 9°39′E
- Country: Switzerland
- Canton: Graubünden
- District: Albula

Area
  - Total: 76.73 km^{2} (29.63 sq mi)
- Elevation: 1,769 m (5,804 ft)

Population (Dec 2014)
  - Total: 189
  - Density: 2.46/km^{2} (6.38/sq mi)
- Time zone: UTC+01:00 (CET)
  - Summer (DST): UTC+02:00 (CEST)
- Postal code: 7457
- SFOS number: 3531
- ISO 3166 code: CH-GR
- Surrounded by: Avers, Bever, Marmorera, Mulegns, Sils im Engadin/Segl, Silvaplana, Soglio, Stampa, Sur
- Website: www.bivio.ch

Bivio (Romansh: Beiva, German: Stallen) is a village and former municipality in the Sursés in the district of Albula of the Swiss canton of Graubünden. On 1 January 2016 the former municipalities of Bivio, Cunter, Marmorera, Mulegns, Riom-Parsonz, Salouf, Savognin, Sur and Tinizong-Rona merged to form the new municipality of Surses.

== History ==
Bivio is first mentioned about 840 as de stabulo Bivio. At one time it was known, in German, as Stallen and until 1895/1903 by its Italian name Stalla.

== Geography ==
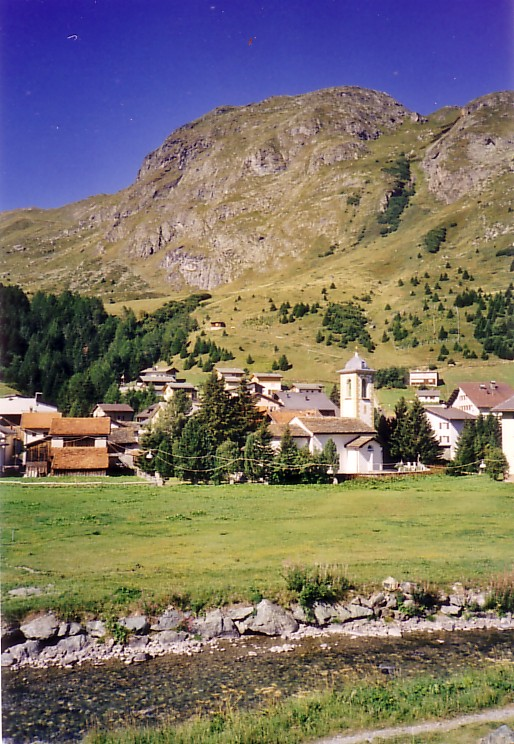
Bivio

Aerial view from 3200 m by Walter Mittelholzer (1925)

Bivio had an area, as of 2006, of 76.7 km^{2} (29.6 sq mi). Of this area, 48.8% is used for agricultural purposes, while 2.2% is forested. Of the rest of the land, 0.4% is settled (buildings or roads) and the remainder (48.6%) is non-productive (rivers, glaciers or mountains).

The village is located on the roads to the Julier and Septimer pass. It is the only traditionally Italian language village north of the continental divide. However, the German-speaking population is now in the majority, with large Romansh- and Italian-speaking minorities. It consists of the village of Bivio and the hamlets of Stalveder, Mott, Cavreccia and Valetta da Beiva. Until 1902 Bivio was known as by its Italian name Stalla.

Neighboring municipalities are Marmorera, Bever (exclave), Silvaplana, Sils im Engadin/Segl, Stampa (exclave Maloja), Soglio, Avers and Mulegns.

== Demographics ==
Bivio had a population (as of 2014) of 189. As of 2008, 14.3% of the population was made up of foreign nationals. Over the last 10 years the population has decreased at a rate of -13.5%.

As of 2000, the gender distribution of the population was 47.5% male and 52.5% female. The age distribution, as of 2000, in Bivio is; 21 people or 10.3% of the population are between 0 and 9 years old. 12 people or 5.9% are 10 to 14, and 3 people or 1.5% are 15 to 19. Of the adult population, 23 people or 11.3% of the population are between 20 and 29 years old. 29 people or 14.2% are 30 to 39, 24 people or 11.8% are 40 to 49, and 29 people or 14.2% are 50 to 59. The senior population distribution is 30 people or 14.7% of the population are between 60 and 69 years old, 24 people or 11.8% are 70 to 79, there are 7 people or 3.4% who are 80 to 89, and there are 2 people or 1.0% who are 90 to 99.

In the 2007 federal election the most popular party was the SVP which received 35.2% of the vote. The next three most popular parties were the FDP (26.5%), the SPS (24.5%) and the CVP (13.5%).

The entire Swiss population is generally well educated. In Bivio about 58.5% of the population (between age 25-64) have completed either non-mandatory upper secondary education or additional higher education (either university or a Fachhochschule).

Bivio has an unemployment rate of 1.55%. As of 2005, there were 21 people employed in the primary economic sector and about 9 businesses involved in this sector. 9 people are employed in the secondary sector and there are 3 businesses in this sector. 68 people are employed in the tertiary sector, with 21 businesses in this sector.

The historical population is given in the following timeline:

== Climate ==
Bivio has an average of 132.1 days of rain per year and on average receives 1,198 mm (47.2 in) of precipitation. The wettest month is August during which time Bivio receives an average of 138 mm (5.4 in) of precipitation. During this month there is precipitation for an average of 11.9 days. The month with the most days of precipitation is May, with an average of 13.1, but with only 125 mm (4.9 in) of precipitation. The driest month of the year is February with an average of 56 mm (2.2 in) of precipitation over 11.9 days.

== Languages ==
Since the Middle Ages, three languages have been spoken in the municipality, with Italian as the official language. However, German has become more and more common over the decades. The local dialect is a dialect of Lombard (Bargajot). The local version of Romansh is somewhere between the two main dialects: Surmiran and Puter. German language breaks up as well into local dialects. In 1880, 67.5% spoke a Romance language (either Italian or Romansh), and in 1910, 67.44% (including 26.36% of Italian speakers). This percentage sank to 43.0% in 1941. Most of the population (as of 2000) speaks German (55.4%), with Italian being second most common (29.4%) and Romansh being third (12.3%).

Languages in Bivio
Language	1980 Census		1990 Census		2000 Census	
Language	Number	Percentage	Number	Percentage	Number	Percentage
German	88	36.97%	120	53.81%	113	55.39%
Romansh	44	18.49%	20	8.97%	25	12.25%
Italian	100	42.02%	76	34.08%	60	29.41%
Population	238	100%	223	100%	204	100%

== Heritage sites of national significance ==
The archeological discovery of a Roman mountain shrine in the Julier pass, is listed as a Swiss heritage sites of national significance.

== See also ==
- Italian Graubünden
