= Cunter =

- Former municipality
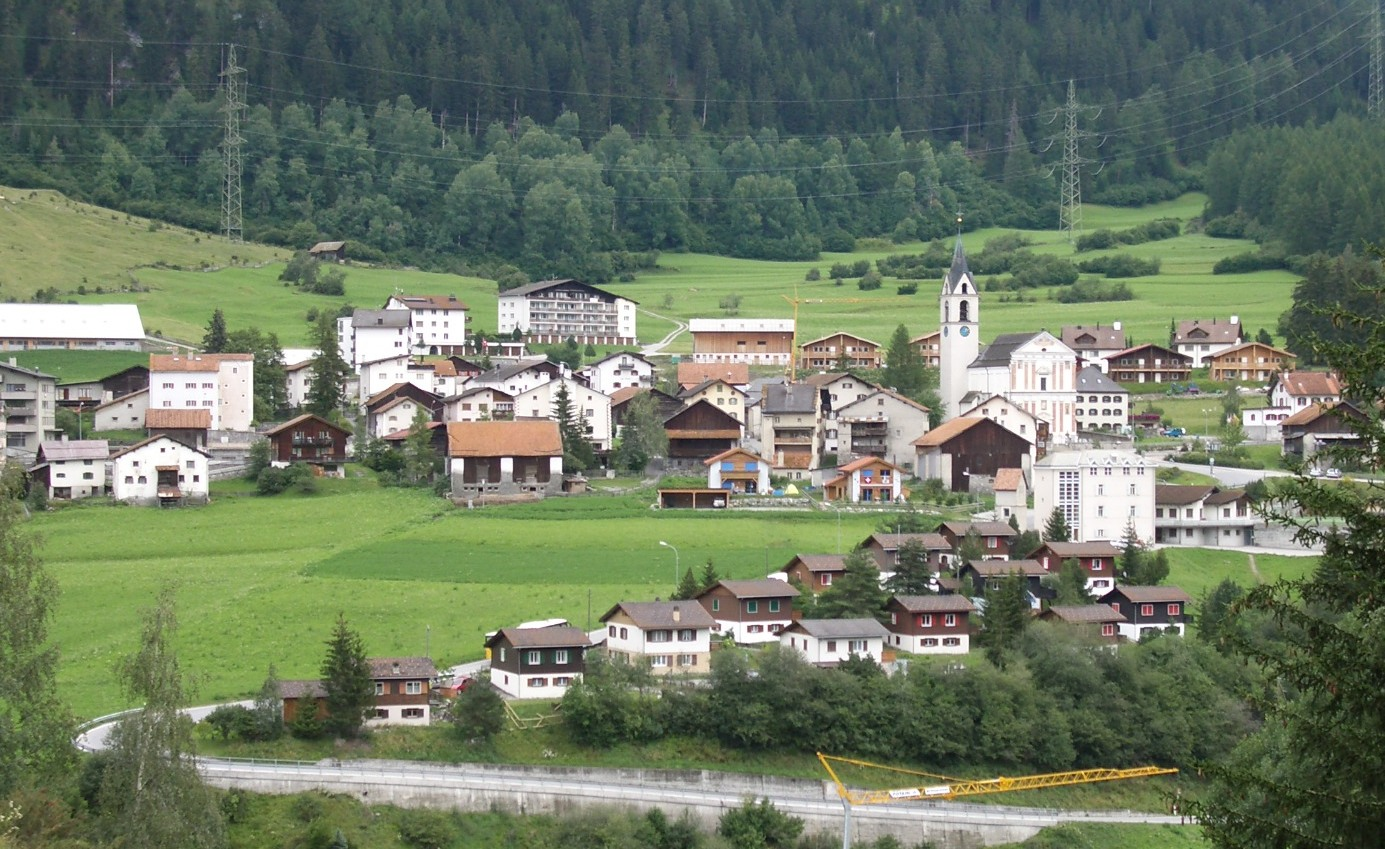

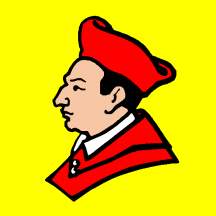
- Flag Coat of arms
- Location of Cunter
- Location within Switzerland Location within Canton of Graubünden
- Coordinates: 46°36′N 9°35′E
- Country: Switzerland
- Canton: Graubünden
- District: Albula

Government
  - Mayor: Filip Dosch

Area
  - Total: 7.11 km^{2} (2.75 sq mi)
- Elevation: 1,182 m (3,878 ft)

Population (Dec 2014)
  - Total: 256
  - Density: 36.0/km^{2} (93.3/sq mi)
- Time zone: UTC+01:00 (CET)
  - Summer (DST): UTC+02:00 (CEST)
- Postal code: 7452
- SFOS number: 3532
- ISO 3166 code: CH-GR
- Localities: Burvagn, Muntschect, Promastgel
- Surrounded by: Riom-Parsonz, Salouf, Savognin, Tiefencastel
- Website: https://surses.ch/RM/surses/vischnancas/cunter.html

Cunter (Romansh, in German: Conters im Oberhalbstein) is a village and former municipality in the Sursés in the district of Albula in the canton of Graubünden in Switzerland. On 1 January 2016 the former municipalities of Bivio, Cunter, Marmorera, Mulegns, Riom-Parsonz, Salouf, Savognin, Sur and Tinizong-Rona merged to form the new municipality of Surses. It is known for having an unusual and profane name in English.

== History ==
Cunter is first mentioned in 1370 as Contra.

== Geography ==
Aerial view by Walter Mittelholzer (1928)

Cunter had an area, as of 2006, of 7.1 square kilometers (2.7 sq mi). Of this area, 32.3% is used for agricultural purposes, while 49.9% is forested. Of the rest of the land, 2.5% is settled (buildings or roads) and the remainder (15.2%) is non-productive (rivers, glaciers or mountains).

The former municipality is located in the Surses sub-district of the Albula district. It lies on the road to the Julier Pass, between Tiefencastel and Savognin. It consists of the village of Cunter and the hamlets of Burvagn, Promastgel and Muntschect. Until 1943 Cunter was known as Conters im Oberhalbstein.

== Demographics ==
Cunter had a population (as of 2014) of 256. As of 2008, 19.7% of the population was made up of foreign nationals. Over the last ten years the population has grown at a rate of 11.5%. Most of the population (as of 2000) speaks Romansh (51.0%), with German being second most common (36.4%) and Italian being third (5.6%).

As of 2000, the gender distribution of the population was 50.2% male and 49.8% female. The age distribution, as of 2000, in Cunter is eighteen people or 9.1% of the population are between 0 and 9 years old. Seven people or 3.5% are 10 to 14, and sixteen people or 8.1% are 15 to 19. Of the adult population, twenty-nine people or 14.6% of the population are between 20 and 29 years old. Twenty-eight people or 14.1% are 30 to 39, thirty-six people or 18.2% are 40 to 49, and thirty-one people or 15.7% are 50 to 59. The senior population distribution is thirteen people or 6.6% of the population are between 60 and 69 years old, fifteen people or 7.6% are 70 to 79, and there are four people or 2.0% who are 80 to 89. There is one person or 0.5% who is 90 to 99.

In the 2007 federal election the most popular party was the CVP which received 62.6% of the vote. The next three most popular parties were the SVP (19.6%), the FDP (10%) and the SPS (6.7%).

The entire Swiss population is generally well educated. In Cunter about 61.5% of the population aged 25 to 64 have completed either non-mandatory upper secondary education or additional higher education (either University or a Fachhochschule).

Cunter has an unemployment rate of 2.44%. As of 2005, there were ten people employed in the primary economic sector and about five businesses involved in this sector. Nine people are employed in the secondary sector and there are three businesses in this sector. Eleven people are employed in the tertiary sector, with six businesses in this sector.

The historical population is given in the following table:

year	population
1850	182
1900	152
1950	152
1970	116
2000	198
2010	240
