= Riom-Parsonz =

- Former municipality
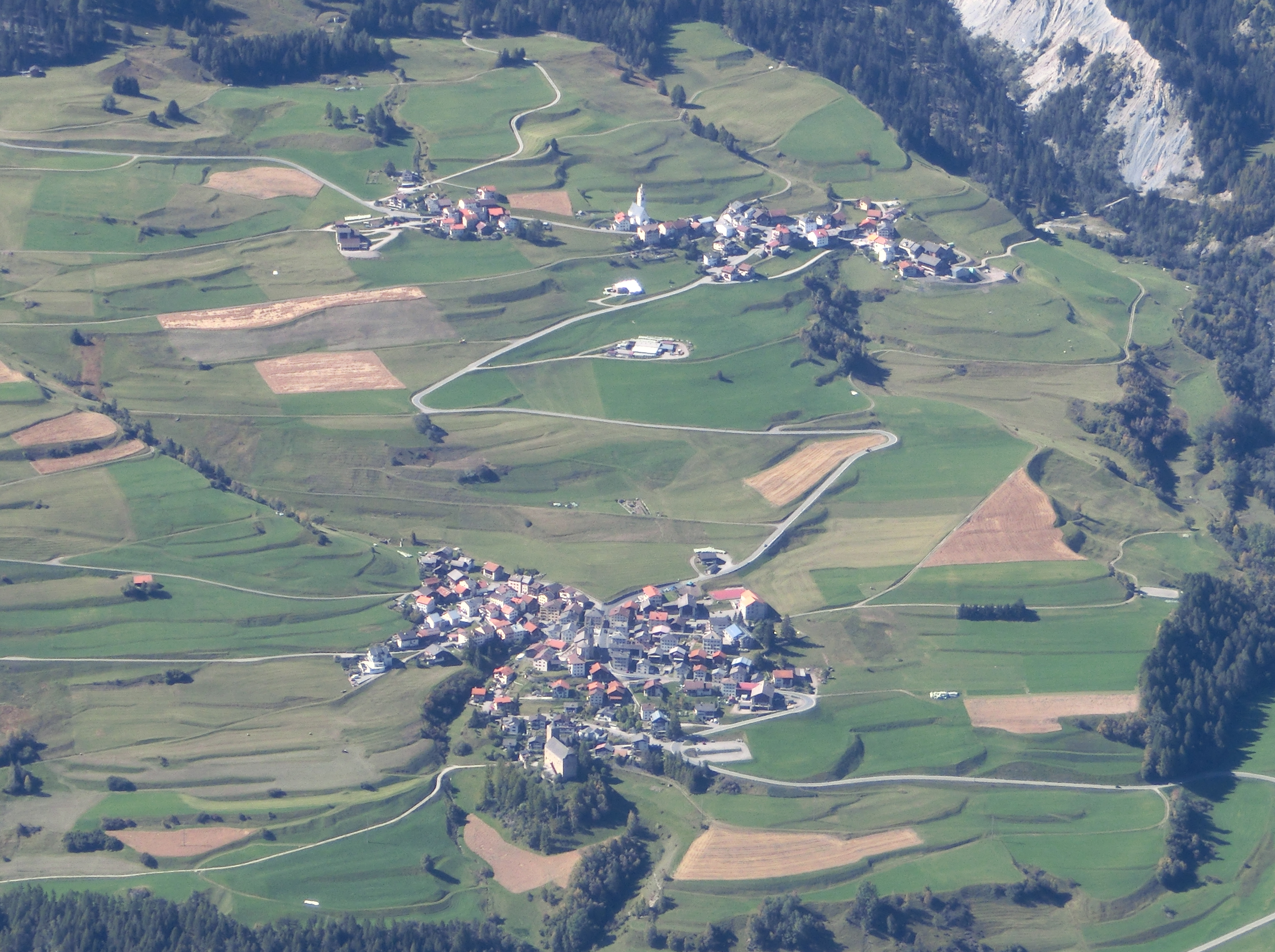
- Riom (bottom) and Parsonz (top)

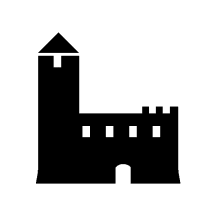
- Flag Coat of arms
- Location of Riom-Parsonz
- Location within Switzerland Location within Canton of Graubünden
- Coordinates: 46°36′N 9°34′E
- Country: Switzerland
- Canton: Graubünden
- District: Albula

Area
  - Total: 56.04 km^{2} (21.64 sq mi)
- Elevation: 1,257 m (4,124 ft)

Population (Dec 2014)
  - Total: 304
  - Density: 5.42/km^{2} (14.0/sq mi)
- Time zone: UTC+01:00 (CET)
  - Summer (DST): UTC+02:00 (CEST)
- Postal code: 7463
- SFOS number: 3536
- ISO 3166 code: CH-GR
- Localities: Parsonz, Riom
- Surrounded by: Cunter, Ferrera, Mon, Mulegns, Salouf, Savognin, Tiefencastel
- Website: https://surses.ch/RM/surses/vischnancas/riom-parsonz.html

Riom-Parsonz is a former municipality in the Sursés in the district of Albula in the canton of Graubünden in Switzerland. It was created from the 1979 union of the villages of Riom and Parsonz. On 1 January 2016 the former municipalities of Bivio, Cunter, Marmorera, Mulegns, Riom-Parsonz, Salouf, Savognin, Sur and Tinizong-Rona merged to form the new municipality of Surses.

== History ==
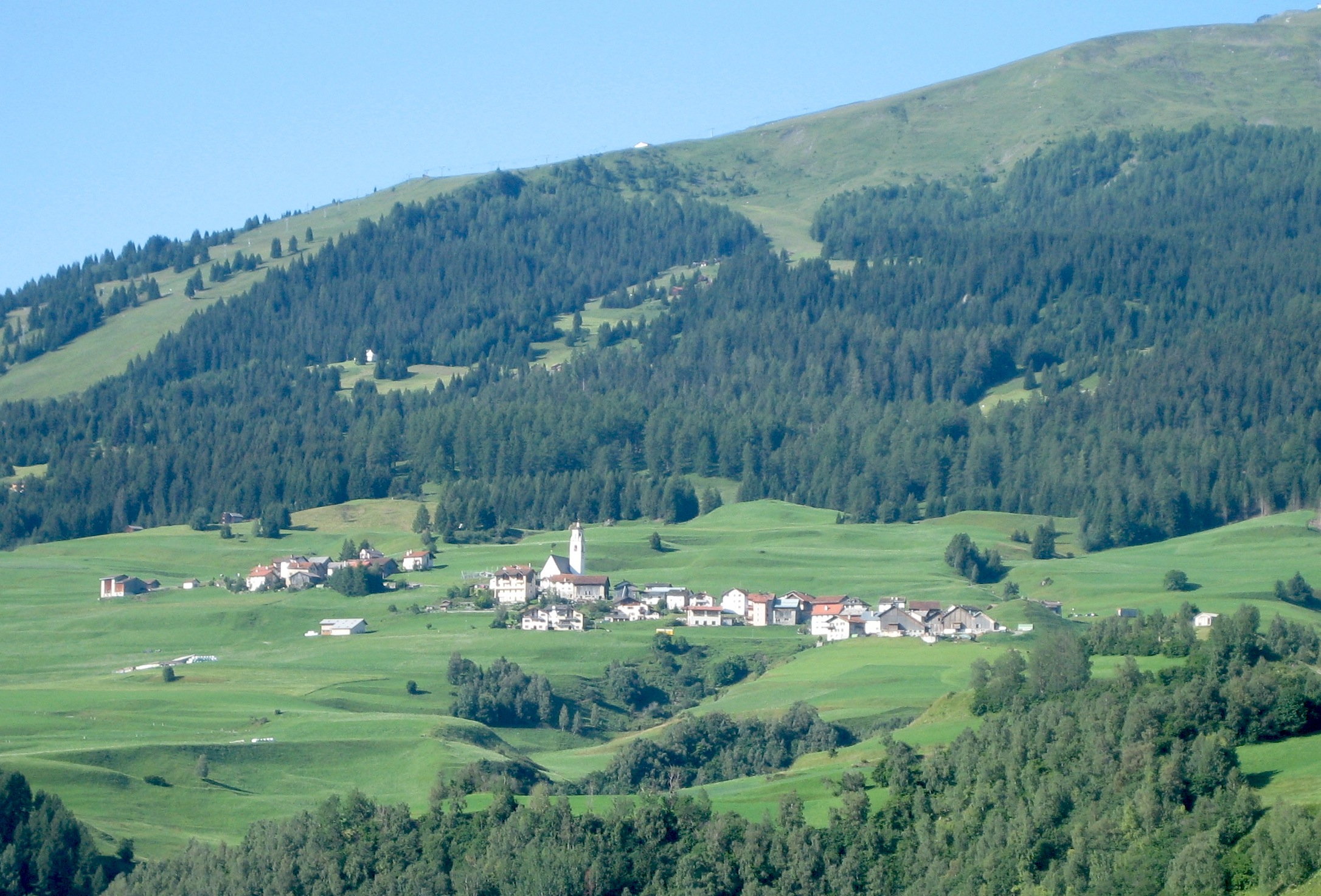
Parsonz village

Riom-Parsonz was created from the 1979 union of the municipalities of Parsonz and Riom. Riom is first mentioned in 841 as villa Riamio and in German it was known as Reams. The other half, Parsonz is first mentioned in 1156 as Presan and in German it was known as Präsanz.

Riom was inhabited during the Roman era, from the 1st century through the 4th. During this time, it was a mansio or way-station along the Julier Pass road. After the Fall of the Western Roman Empire, farmers and herders continued to live here during the Early Middle Ages. In 840 it was personally owned by the king of Raetia Curiensis and a local administrative center.

== Geography ==
Aerial view (1947)

Riom-Parsonz had an area, as of 2006, of 56 km^{2} (22 sq mi). Of this area, 51% is used for agricultural purposes, while 18% is forested. Of the rest of the land, 1.1% is settled (buildings or roads) and the remainder (30%) is non-productive (rivers, glaciers or mountains).

The former municipality is located in the Surses sub-district of the Albula district. Riom-Parsonz is located along the old road to the Julier pass and on a western terrace of the Oberhalbstein Range.

== Demographics ==
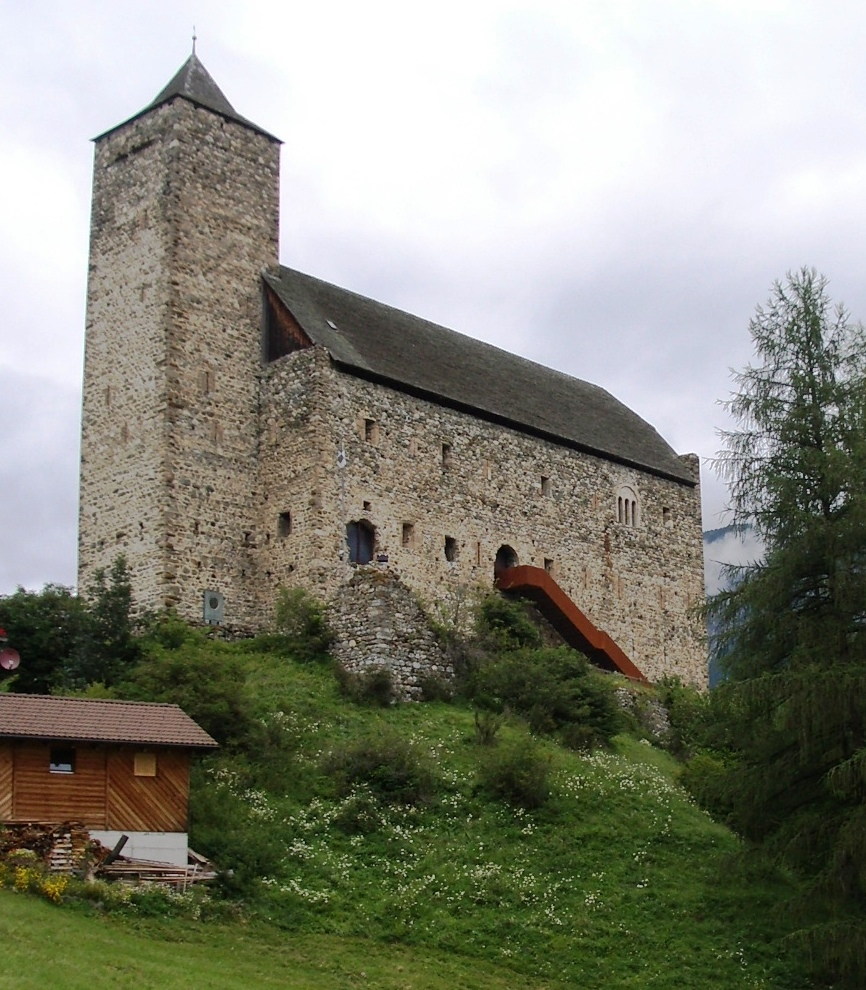
Castle Rätia Ampla in Riom, built 1227

Riom-Parsonz had a population (as of 2014) of 304. As of 2008, 3.1% of the population was made up of foreign nationals. Over the last 10 years the population has decreased at a rate of -12.2%.

As of 2000, the gender distribution of the population was 53.1% male and 46.9% female. The age distribution, as of 2000, in Riom-Parsonz is; 46 people or 14.1% of the population are between 0 and 9 years old. 26 people or 8.0% are 10 to 14, and 16 people or 4.9% are 15 to 19. Of the adult population, 18 people or 5.5% of the population are between 20 and 29 years old. 53 people or 16.2% are 30 to 39, 49 people or 15.0% are 40 to 49, and 38 people or 11.6% are 50 to 59. The senior population distribution is 29 people or 8.9% of the population are between 60 and 69 years old, 38 people or 11.6% are 70 to 79, there are 13 people or 4.0% who are 80 to 89, and there are 1 people or 0.3% who are 90 to 99.

In the 2007 federal election the most popular party was the CVP which received 29.4% of the vote. The next three most popular parties were the SPS (23.9%), the SVP (23.6%) and the FDP (22.8%).

In Riom-Parsonz about 66.5% of the population (between age 25-64) have completed either non-mandatory upper secondary education or additional higher education (either university or a Fachhochschule).

Riom-Parsonz has an unemployment rate of 0.88%. As of 2005, there were 42 people employed in the primary economic sector and about 19 businesses involved in this sector. 2 people are employed in the secondary sector and there are 2 businesses in this sector. 34 people are employed in the tertiary sector, with 13 businesses in this sector.

The historical population for the combined municipality is given in the following table:

| year | population |
|---|---|
| 1850 | 417 |
| 1900 | 334 |
| 1950 | 350 |
| 1960 | 276 |
| 1970 | 288 |
| 1980 | 263 |
| 1990 | 297 |
| 2000 | 329 |

== Languages ==
Most of the population (as of 2000) speaks Rhaeto-Romance (63.9%), with German being second most common (33.6%) and Italian being third ( 1.8%).

Languages in Riom-Parsonz
| Languages | Census 1980 | | Census 1990 | | Census 2000 | |
| Languages | Number | Percent | Number | Percent | Number | Percent |
|---|---|---|---|---|---|---|
| German | 25 | 9.51% | 55 | 18.52% | 110 | 33.64% |
| Romanish | 229 | 87.07% | 234 | 78.79% | 209 | 63.91% |
| Italian | 9 | 3.42% | 3 | 1.01% | 6 | 1.83% |
| Population | 263 | 100% | 297 | 100% | 327 | 100% |
