= Mulegns =

- Former municipality
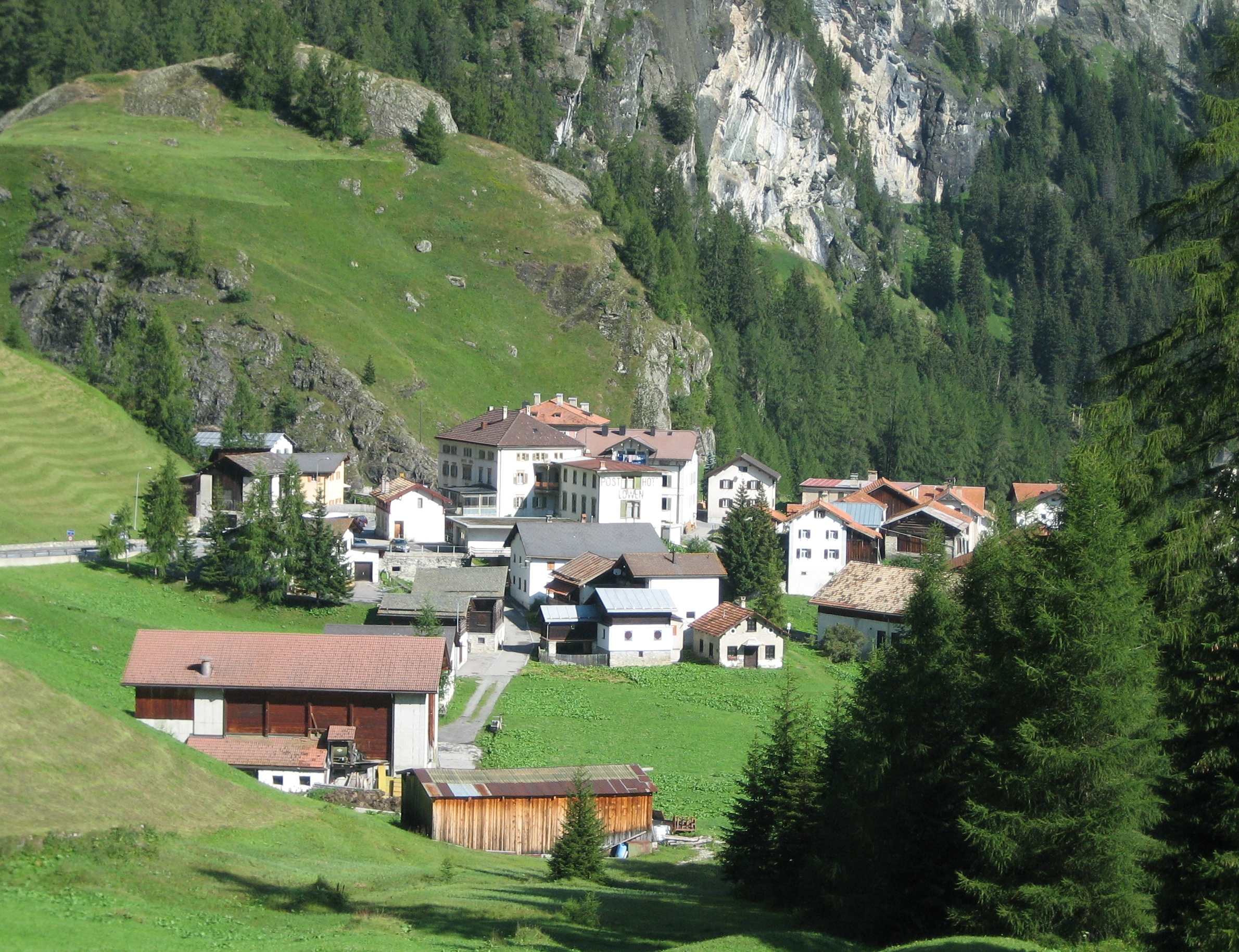

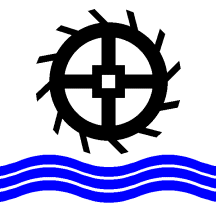
- Flag Coat of arms
- Location of Mulegns
- Location within Switzerland Location within Canton of Graubünden
- Coordinates: 46°31′N 9°37′E
- Country: Switzerland
- Canton: Graubünden
- District: Albula

Area
  - Total: 33.80 km^{2} (13.05 sq mi)
- Elevation: 1,481 m (4,859 ft)

Population (Dec 2014)
  - Total: 25
  - Density: 0.74/km^{2} (1.9/sq mi)
- Time zone: UTC+01:00 (CET)
  - Summer (DST): UTC+02:00 (CEST)
- Postal code: 7455
- SFOS number: 3534
- ISO 3166 code: CH-GR
- Surrounded by: Avers, Bivio, Ferrera, Marmorera, Riom-Parsonz, Savognin, Sur, Tinizong-Rona
- Website: https://surses.ch/RM/surses/vischnancas/mulegns.html

Mulegns is a village and a former municipality in the Sursés in the district of Albula in the canton of Graubünden in Switzerland. On 1 January 2016 the former municipalities of Bivio, Cunter, Marmorera, Mulegns, Riom-Parsonz, Salouf, Savognin, Sur and Tinizong-Rona merged to form the new municipality of Surses.

== History ==
Around 600-500 BC, a copper mine and smelter were built in the Val Faller (Faller valley) near modern Mulegns. The village was founded by a Walser group during the 15th Century. It was first mentioned in 1521.

== Geography ==
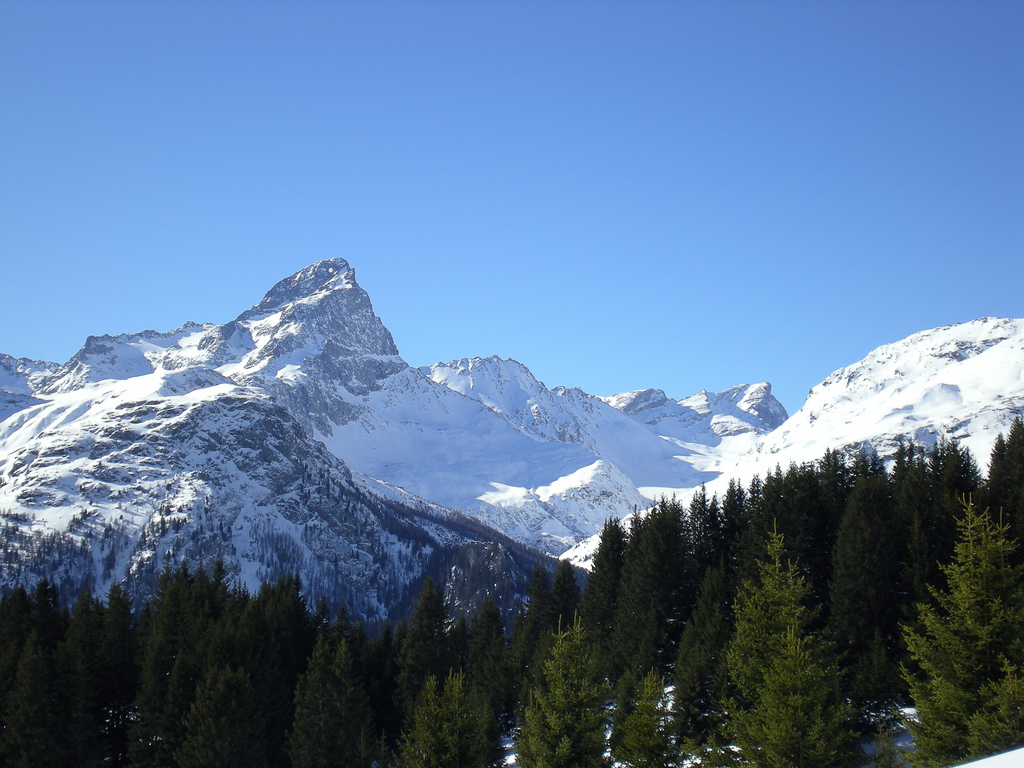
Piz Platta, near Mulegns

Mulegns had an area, as of 2006, of 33.8 km^{2} (13.1 sq mi). Of this area, 30.1% is used for agricultural purposes, while 9.8% is forested. Of the rest of the land, 0.4% is settled (buildings or roads) and the remainder (59.6%) is non-productive (rivers, glaciers or mountains).

The former municipality is located in the Surses sub-district of the Albula district. It is along the road to the Julier Pass (the Julienstrasse) at the entrance to a side valley of the Val Faller. Until 1943 Mulegns was known as Mühlen.

== Demographics ==
Mulegns had a population (as of 2014) of 25. Over the last 10 years the population has decreased at a rate of -23.5%.

As of 2000, the gender distribution of the population was 50.0% male and 50.0% female. The age distribution, as of 2000, in Mulegns is; 3 people or 9.1% of the population are between 0 and 9 years old. 1 person or 3.0% is 10 to 14, and 2 people or 6.1% are 15 to 19. Of the adult population, no one is between 20 and 29 years old. 6 people or 18.2% are 30 to 39, 1 person or 3.0% is 40 to 49, and 5 people or 15.2% are 50 to 59. The senior population distribution is 8 people or 24.2% of the population are between 60 and 69 years old, 6 people or 18.2% are 70 to 79, there is 1 person or 3.0% who is 80 to 89.

In the 2007 federal election the most popular party was the CVP which received 63.3% of the vote. The next two most popular parties were the SVP (20%) and the FDP (8.3%).

In Mulegns about 62.5% of the population (between age 25–64) have completed either non-mandatory upper secondary education or additional higher education (either university or a Fachhochschule).

Mulegns has an unemployment rate of 1.56%. As of 2005, there were 12 people employed in the primary economic sector and about 5 businesses involved in this sector. people are employed in the secondary sector and there are businesses in this sector. 1 people are employed in the tertiary sector, with 1 businesses in this sector.

The historical population is given in the following table:

year	population
1850	120
1900	146
1950	109
1960	57
1970	66
1980	50
1990	37
2000	33

== Languages ==
Most of the population (as of 2000) speaks Rhaeto-Romance (57.6%), with the rest speaking German(42.4%).

Languages in Mulegns
Languages	Census 1980		Census 1990		Census 2000	
Languages	Number	Percent	Number	Percent	Number	Percent
German	4	8.00%	10	27.03%	14	42.42%
Romanish	46	92.00%	27	72.97%	19	57.58%
Italian	0	0.00%	0	0.00%	0	0.00%
Population	50	100%	37	100%	33	100%
