= Marmorera (film) =

- Swiss movie poster
- Directed by: Markus Fischer
- Written by: Markus Fischer; Dominik Bernet
- Produced by: Jörg Bundschuh; Markus Fischer; Josefa Haas
- Starring: Eva Dewaele; Anatole Taubman; Corin Curschellas; Mavie Hörbiger; Ursina Lardi; Mathias Gnädinger
- Cinematography: Jörg Schmidt-Reitwein
- Edited by: Bernhard Lehner
- Music by: Peter Scherer
- Production companies: Snakefilm GmbH, Kick Film GmbH, Schweizer Radio und Fernsehen SRF, ARTE
- Distributed by: Rialto Film AG
- Release date: 25 January 2007
- Running time: 95 min
- Languages: German; Swiss German; Rumantsch

Marmorera is a 2007 Swiss film. It tells the fictitious story of the small Alpine village Marmorera, the identity of its inhabitants and a mysterious woman. The mystery film was filmed and produced in Switzerland.

== Plot (excerpt) ==
Simon Cavegn's grandmother, mother and father were born in Marmorera. Cavegn and his wife Paula spend their honeymoon at the place of his family's origin. Taking some selfies, the newlyweds notice that a fisherman disappears on the Lai da Marmorera, the reservoir of the Marmorera dam. At the same time, a young woman is lying in the fisherman's boat. Cavegn believes that he has rescued the mysterious woman, but when emergency services arrive, the young woman seems to be dead. During the transfer to the hospital in Savognin, the red-haired woman "awakes", and some mysterious events occur in the following days. The confused young woman without identity and language is taken to the Burghölzli psychiatric clinic in Zürich where she soon becomes a puzzling figure of much concern for psychiatrists of the Burghölzli sanatorium in Zürich-Weinegg. Simon Cavegn becomes her psychiatrist in charge, calls the unknown woman Julia, and starts to discover the dark secret of Marmorera.

Cavegn was born and raised in Zürich. His parents died in a car accident. Soon Cavegn suspects that this patient will be much more than another medical problem to solve. Is Julia perhaps dangerous, or is she merely an interesting example of an extraordinary mind? Or is Julia actually a curse from a bygone era, which the residents of Marmorera have carefully tried to hide? Cavegn seems to be the only one to whom Julia spoke; she tells him a kind of visions that are related to the future deaths of people from Marmorera. However, on the videos that were taken in the course of the therapy, there is no sound, and even Julia is physically not able to speak. For Simon's wife Paula, Julia is soon a dangerous rival, although the unusual patient is always quiet and modest – as long as she is allowed to use a bathtub whenever she wants.

In the meantime, at the Marmorera village that was re-erected at the road to the Julier Pass in 1954, bizarre deaths accumulate, and Simon finds increasingly clear connections between these "accidents", his patient and the flooded mountain village at the base of the dam. Cavegn tries to talk about his observations with the chief psychiatrist, with his wife and with his friend, and he also contacts Motta, the attorney in charge who is investigating the increasing number of casualties. In Marmorera, myth and reality meet, and the remaining few inhabitants are convinced that the rumors about a curse are not just fairy tales. The inscription "Resistance" at the facade of a house in the new Marmorera village remembers that not all residents had agreed to sell their village and their country to the Zürich electricity company before the dam was built. Cavegn tries to prevent further casualties. Even the city of Zürich could be threatened by the curse of Marmorea because it draws its power supply from the power plant at the Marmorera reservoir.

Simon's distress goes so far that, towards the end of the film, he puts himself in danger: While his baby is being born, he receives a call from the restaurant saying that "she [Julia] is back" and that the top of the church tower of the sunken Marmorera can once more be seen in the lake. While on his way there, a squirrel suddenly jumps against the windshield, causing him to lose control of his car, driving off the road. The film ends with Simon finding himself at the bottom of the reservoir in the time before the flood and Julia sees Julia in a window of one of the old houses. Then the city of Zurich at night is seen, with all the lights slowly going out, while sirens wail in the background.

== Cast ==
- Eva Dewaele : Julia
- Anatole Taubman : Simon Cavegn
- Corin Curschellas : Rosa Pellegrina
- Mavie Hörbiger : Paula Cavegn
- Ursina Lardi : Dr. Alexandra Kovach
- Mathias Gnädinger : Gregor Sonderegger

== Awards ==
- 2007: Festival del film Locarno, Prix SUISA for the best film music.
- 2007: Festival de Cine Fantástico de Málaga, awarded as "Best Film".
- 2007: Festival de Cine Fantástico de Málaga, awarded as "Best Cinematographie" 2007.

== Critical response ==
The German movie website film.de described the film as a moody and visually stunning horror thriller from Switzerland.

== Home media ==
The film was released under the title Marmorera - Der Fluch der Nixe in the DVD format (RC2) on 15 May 2008. The home release included language versions in German and Swiss German in Dolby Digital 5.1, and subtitles in English, French and German.

== Soundtrack ==
On occasion of the Festival del Film Locarno, the SUISA Foundation awarded Peter Scherer for the best film music. The members of the jury praised the musical quality of Scherer's composition and commended the outstanding performance of the Swiss Youth Symphony Orchestra for its commitment and its excellent interpretation. The soundtrack by Scherer is also available as download.

== Background ==
Zürich needed electrical power, and so – unceremoniously, despite the resistance of the population – the village Marmomera sunk in a dam reservoir in 1954. The village was rebuilt and its inhabitants resettled. Wide parts of the Alpine village of Marmorera and the surrounding valley were flooded for the dam project. Marmorera is a ghost story about the mystery of identity of individuals and a village that disappeared beneath the waters of a reservoir. It is a story about the identity of a young woman without name, origin and language skills, and the identity of a young psychiatrist who takes care of this young woman and gradually realises that his own identity is based on the soil of this mysterious lake, and on the identity of the growing number of dead people, who were all taken from their home village Marmorera.

== Production ==
Based on the historical facts, the fictitious mystery film was produced at the original locations, as well as in Savognin, in the Weinegg district of Zürich, on the Limmat near Technopark Zürich, at the Limmatquai promenade, and on the Münsterbrücke river crossing towards Münsterhof.

The Swiss synchronised swimming team Limmat-Nixen was also involved in the production, "starring" Julia, the mysterious woman, in the last sequences of the film.

The script was published by Dominik Bernet as a paperback on 1 March 2008.

== Literature ==
- Dominik Bernet: Marmorera. Piper Verlag GmbH, München 2008, ISBN 978-3-4922-5143-3.
