= Septimer Pass =

High alpine pass in Swiss canton of Graubünden

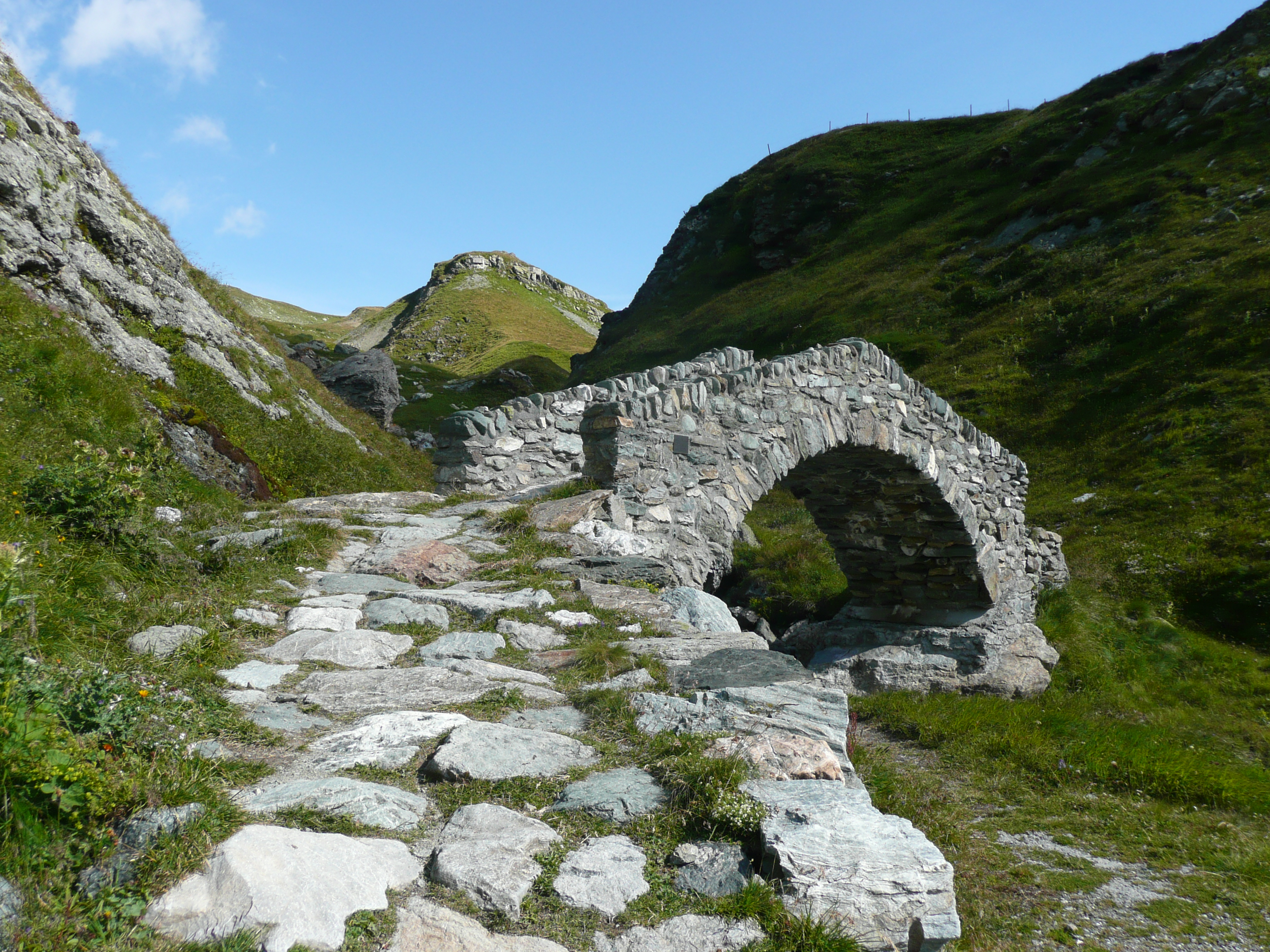
- Historic bridge on the southern approach

- Location within Switzerland
- Elevation: 2,310 metres (7,580 ft)
- Traversed by: Trail

Third Approach
- Location: Switzerland
- Range: Alps
- Coordinates: 46°25.2′N 09°38.28′E

Septimer Pass (German: Septimerpass, Italian: Passo del Settimo, Romansh: Pass da Sett; elevation 2,310 meters or 7,580 feet) is a high mountain pass in the canton of Graubünden in the Swiss Alps between the valleys of Bregaglia (Bergell) and Surses (Oberhalbstein). It is traditionally considered the boundary between the Oberhalbstein and Albula Alps. During the Middle Ages, this, the Great St. Bernard, and the Brenner Passes were the preferred routes over the Alps for traveling emperors. The nearest inhabited localities on the approaches of the Septimer Pass are Casaccia on the south and Bivio on the north.

Already in use by the Romans, who maintained a legion camp in the pass around AD 15–16, this pass was an important trade route from Milan through Bivio to Augsburg It was easier to use than the Splügen Pass, due to the latter having the difficult gorges of the river Hinterrhein. One of the earliest mentions of a Christian hospice was the one placed at the pass itself, mentioned in 831. It was mentioned in documents for the following millennium, even though it was abandoned in the tenth century and rebuilt at the beginning of the eleventh. (The hospice was later abandoned for good in 1778.) During the Middle Ages the Septimer Pass was crucial to the temporal power of the Bishopric of Chur, whose extensive territories until the fourteenth century included Chiavenna. In 1236 the St. Gotthard Pass opened, allowing traffic from Lucerne to Milan, which diverted merchants from going through Chur. The pass further lost importance after the construction of roads over the Julier and Maloja passes.

According to Michiel de Vaan, the etymology of the pass could go back to a (Late) Latin *Saeptu Monte bzw. *Monte Saeptu 'protected mountain pass'.

== See also ==
- Julier Pass and Maloja Pass, road passes in proximity of the Septimer Pass
- List of mountain passes in Switzerland

== Sources ==
- Fassbinder, Jörg W. E.; Sternberg, Rob; Zanier, Werner; Ebner, Doris; Rageth, Jürg (21 February 2014). "Magnetic prospecting of the Roman military camp at Septimer Pass (Switzerland)". Open Journal of Archaeometry. 2 (1). doi:10.4081/arc.2014.5303.
- Freshfield, Douglas W. (1917). "The Great Passes of the Western and Central Alps". The Geographical Journal. 49 (1): 2–22. doi:10.2307/1779776. JSTOR 1779776.
- Hyde, Walter Woodburn (1937). "The Alpine Passes in Nature and History". The Scientific Monthly. 45 (4): 317–330. Bibcode:1937SciMo..45..317W. JSTOR 16413.
- Munro, John H. (2001). "The 'New Institutional Economics' and the Changing Fortunes of Fairs in Medieval and Early Modern Europe: the Textile Trades, Warfare, and Transaction Costs". VSWG: Vierteljahrschrift für Sozial- und Wirtschaftsgeschichte. 88 (1): 1–47. JSTOR 20740358.
- de Vaan, Michiel (2025). "Der Passname Septimer". In Werner Zanier (ed.). Das römische Militärlager auf dem Septimerpass in Graubünden (Schweiz). Münchner Beiträge zur Vor- und Frühgeschichte. Vol. 2. München: C. H. Beck. pp. 555–560. ISBN 978-3-406-80148-8.
