= Marmels Castle =

- Marmorera
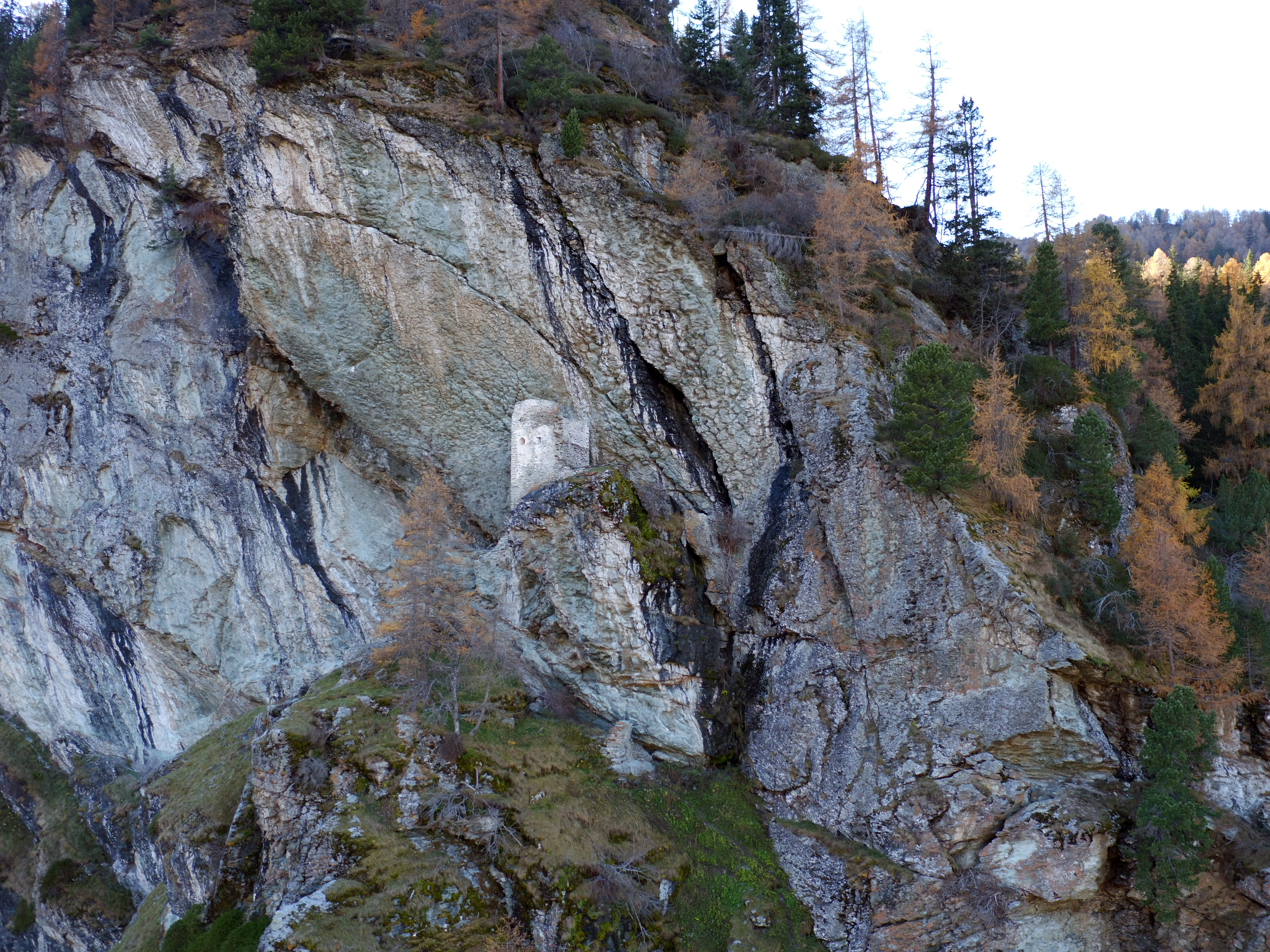
- The ruins of Marmels Castle

Site information
- Type: Cave Castle
- Code: CH-GR
- Condition: ruined

Location
- Coordinates: 46°30′24″N 9°37′39″E
- Height: 1,710 m above the sea

Site history
- Built: around 1100
- Materials: rubble stone

Garrison information
- Occupants: Ministerialis

Marmels Castle German: Burg Marmels is a ruined castle in the municipality of Marmorera in the district of Albula in the canton of Graubünden in Switzerland.

== Location ==
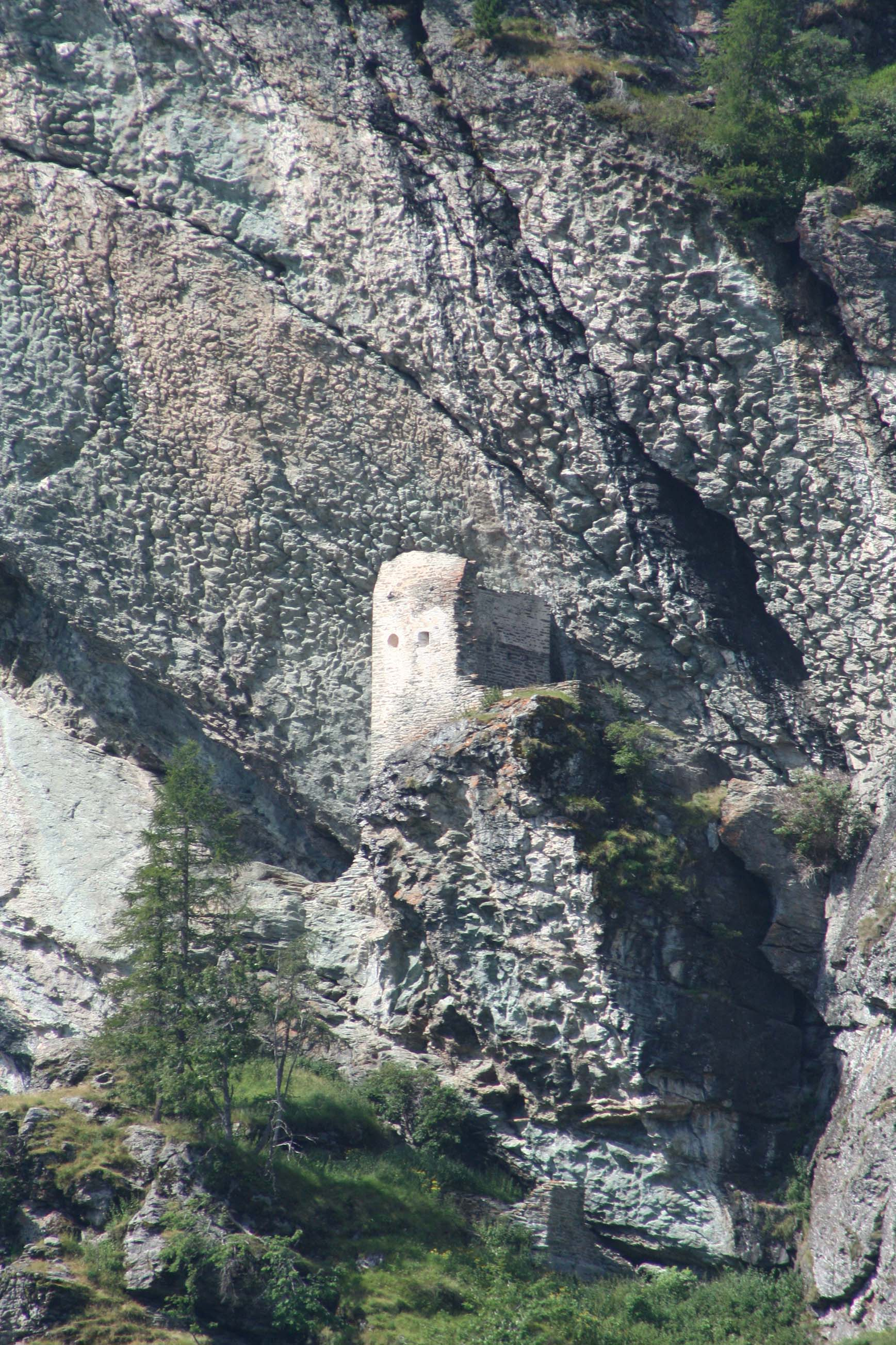
Location of the ruins of Burg Marmels

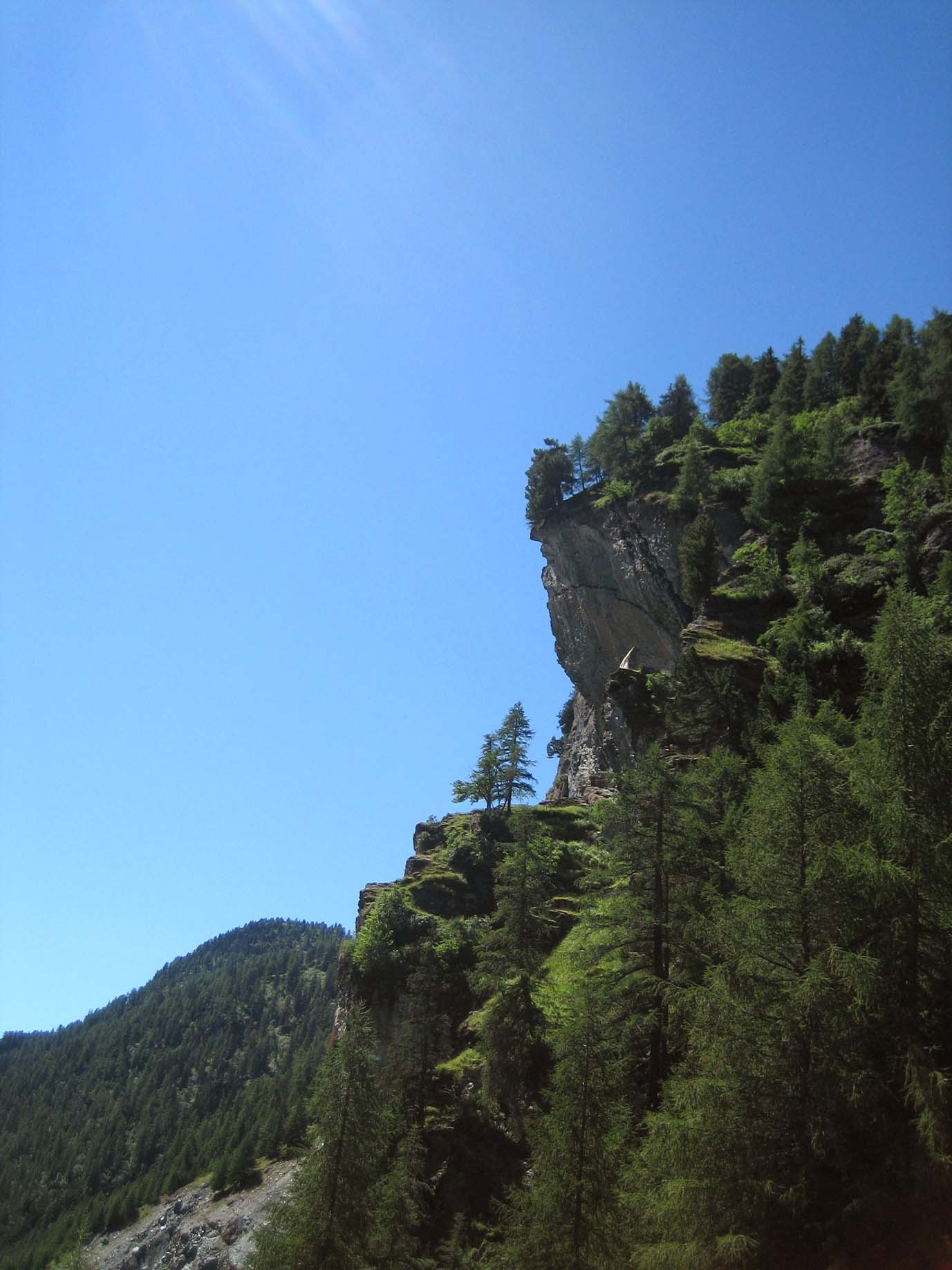
Location of the castle terrace

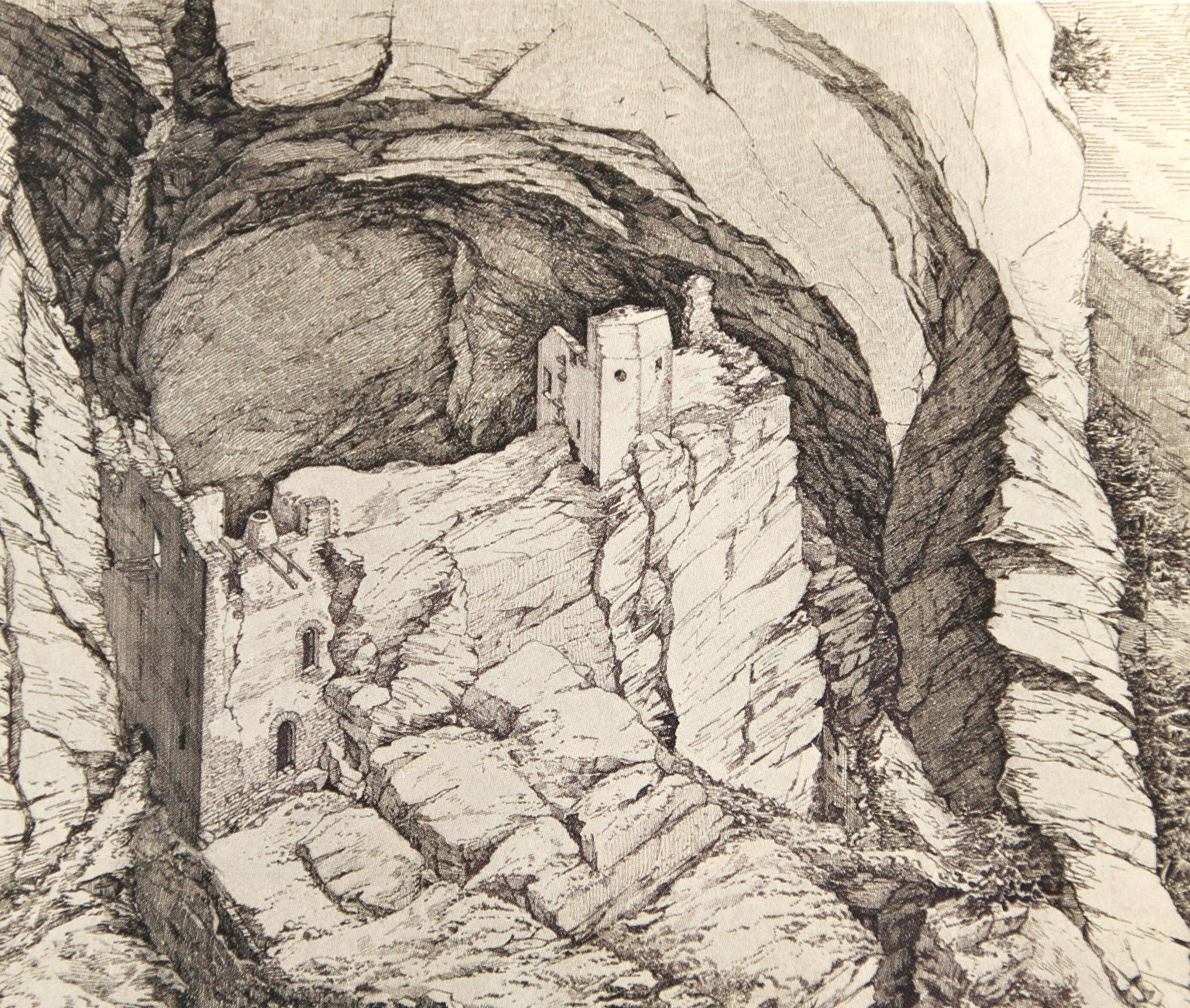
Burg Marmels from a sketch from 1893

The ruins of the Grottenburg (a castle built into a naturally occurring cave) Marmels are located on two rocky points high above the embankment dam that formed the Lai da Marmorera near the municipality of Marmorera. The entrance to the ruins is along a path that starts near the dam and then climbs steeply through the woods. The path may require an experienced climber and in wet weather may be inaccessible.

== Site ==
Burgruine Marmels

On the lowest level, there are portions of two sections of the curtain wall which follow the edge of the cliff. Additionally, traces of an overhanging platform and the outer gatehouse can still be seen. The three-story, square keep is located on the southern terrace and rested against the surrounding rock, as can be seen in the sketch from 1893. Only the foundation of the towers of the keep are still visible. The keep had a door and half-round tower on the ground floor as well as another entrance on the next level. These entrances are no longer visible in the foundation. The type and shape of the roof is not known. In the southern wall there was a door that led to a fourth story arbor.

A steep path along the rear wall of the grotto leads to the upper level of the castle site. It is clear that there were additional buildings, however, the exact nature or size is not known.

The two-story chapel is still standing. The lighter plaster that it was covered with, makes it stand out against the rock wall. The half-round apse is built into the eastern wall. The plaster is still in good condition. Both levels of the chapel can be reached from the west side.

It is unclear how the inhabitants of the castle would have provided drinking water, as there is no well in the castle site.

On a small plateau, north of the chapel, are the ruins of a later building. This structure might have served as housing for the priest.

On a small outcrop below the castle, the ruins of a small building have been discovered. This building, located between the castle and the village, may have been a small trading post which allowed local farmers to sell food to the inhabitants of the castle.

== History ==
It is unknown exactly when the castle was built. The design of the chapel entered Rätien by the end of the Carolingian era (9th Century) and remained in use until the early 12th Century. Based on the construction of the chapel, the foundation of the castle was likely about 1100.

The knights of Marmels were first mentioned as ministerialis, or unfree knights, in the service of the Freiherren (or Baron) of Tarasp in 1160. The castle is first mentioned in 1193. Andreas von Tarasp granted Andreas von Marmels, who already held a fiefdom over half of Tarasp Castle, a position as a ministerialis to the Bishop of Chur. In service to the Bishop, the family was able to expand their land and power. They grew to be one of the foremost minor noble families in Rätien. In addition to their castle at Marmels, they held Burg Spliatsch as a Vögte (or reeve) and the village of Riom. Burg Marmels was first mentioned in 1193 when Andreas von Marmels (or his son with the same name) captured the Cardinal Legate Cintius for the Emperor and held him at the castle.

The most important member of the line was Conradin von Marmels († 1517/18) who held titles to Haldenstein and Rhäzüns. During the Swabian War of 1499, he commanded the troops of the Three Leagues against the Habsburgs. However, due to his pro-Habsburg stance he was quickly overthrown and imprisoned. His oldest son, Johannes inherited Rhäzüns and later Neu-Aspermont Castle. His younger son, Rudolf, received Burg Haldenstein, was mayor of Chur and later the primary Landeshauptmann in Veltlin.

The castle remained in the possession of the family von Marmels throughout its history, which is quite unusual. The last mention of the castle is in 1550. Conradin's son Rudolf sold the castle, along with the tower of Tinizong and the Burg Spliatsch to his nephew Hans. Hans promptly went in arrears on the debt that he ran up to purchase the castle, and Rudolf bought the castle back from him. At that time the castle was in livable condition. By the 16th Century it was abandoned and in the early 17th Century it had fallen into ruin. An earthquake partly destroyed it in 1905.

Unlike most Rätien nobles, the House of Marmels did not die out. The descendants of the von Marmels now have the last name of Demarmels.

== Gallery ==
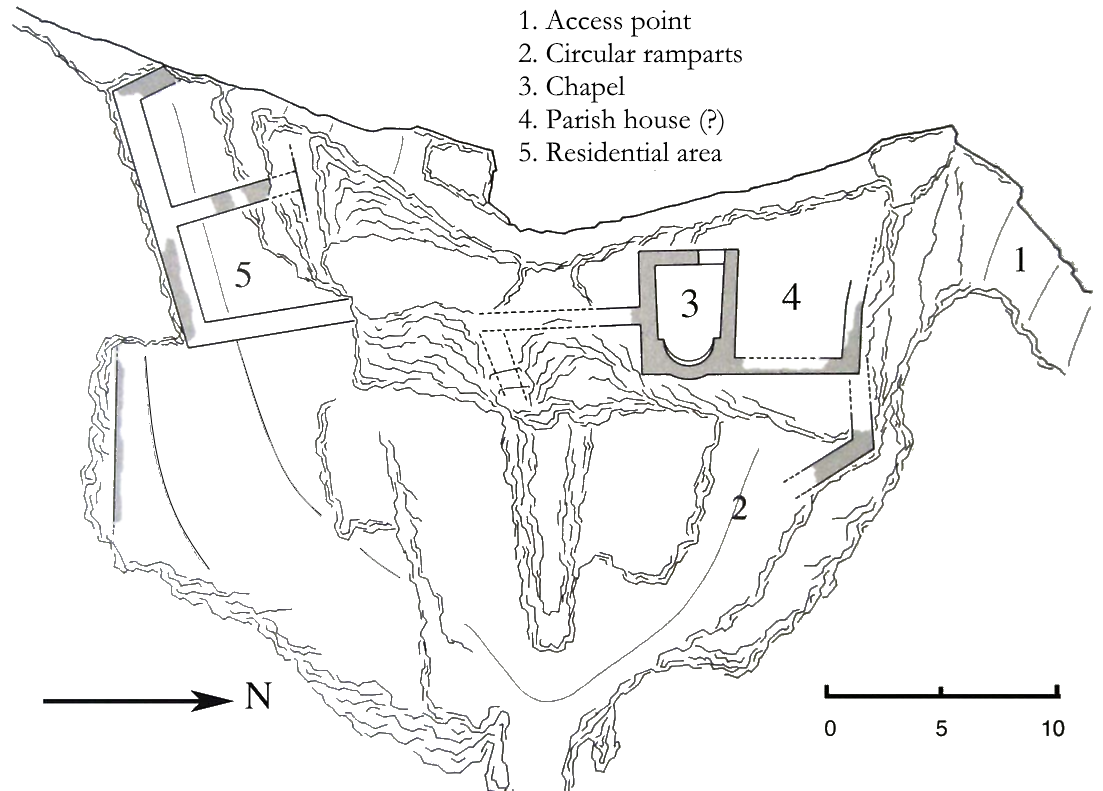
Castle layout

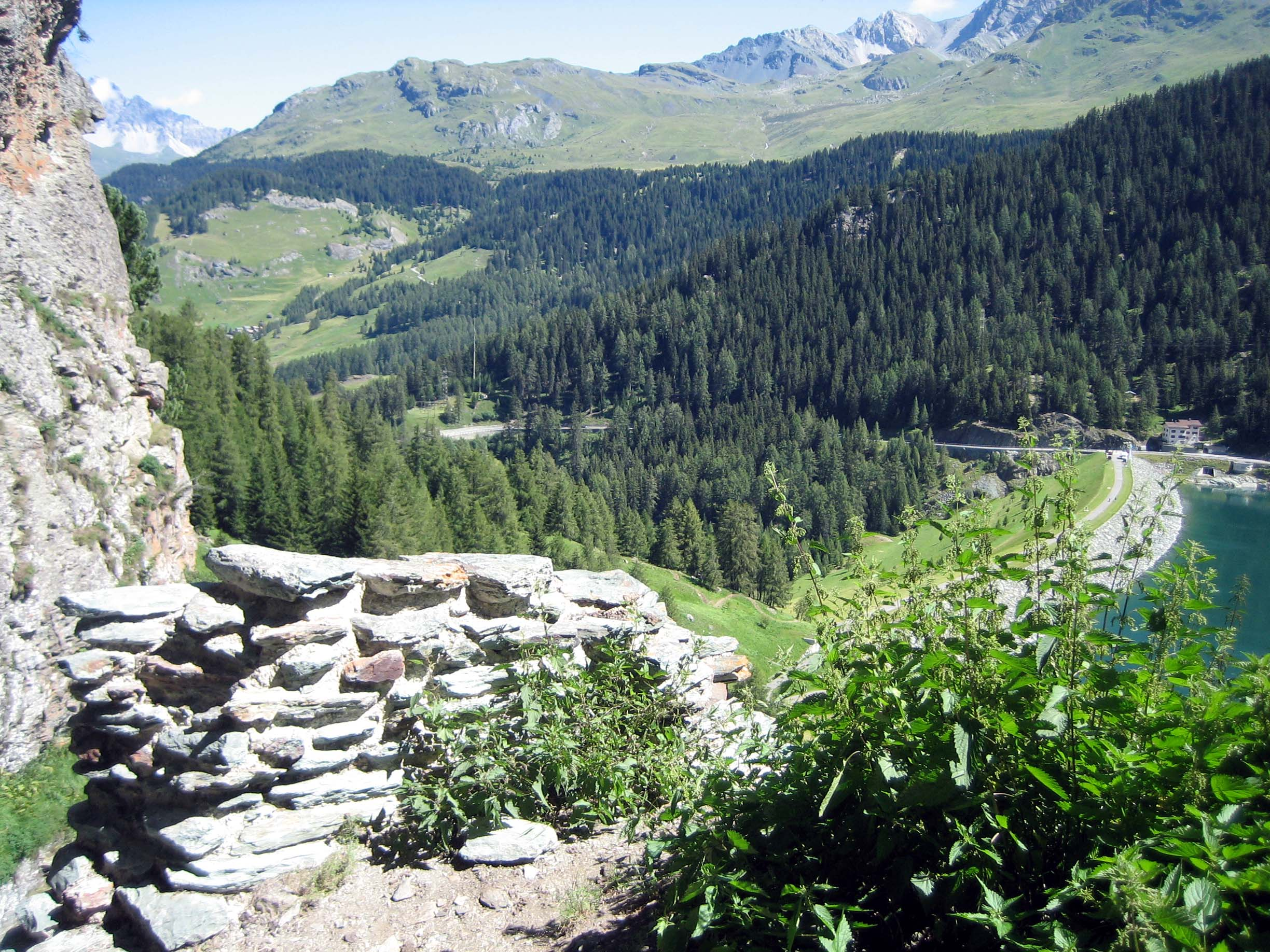
Wall foundation from the northern section

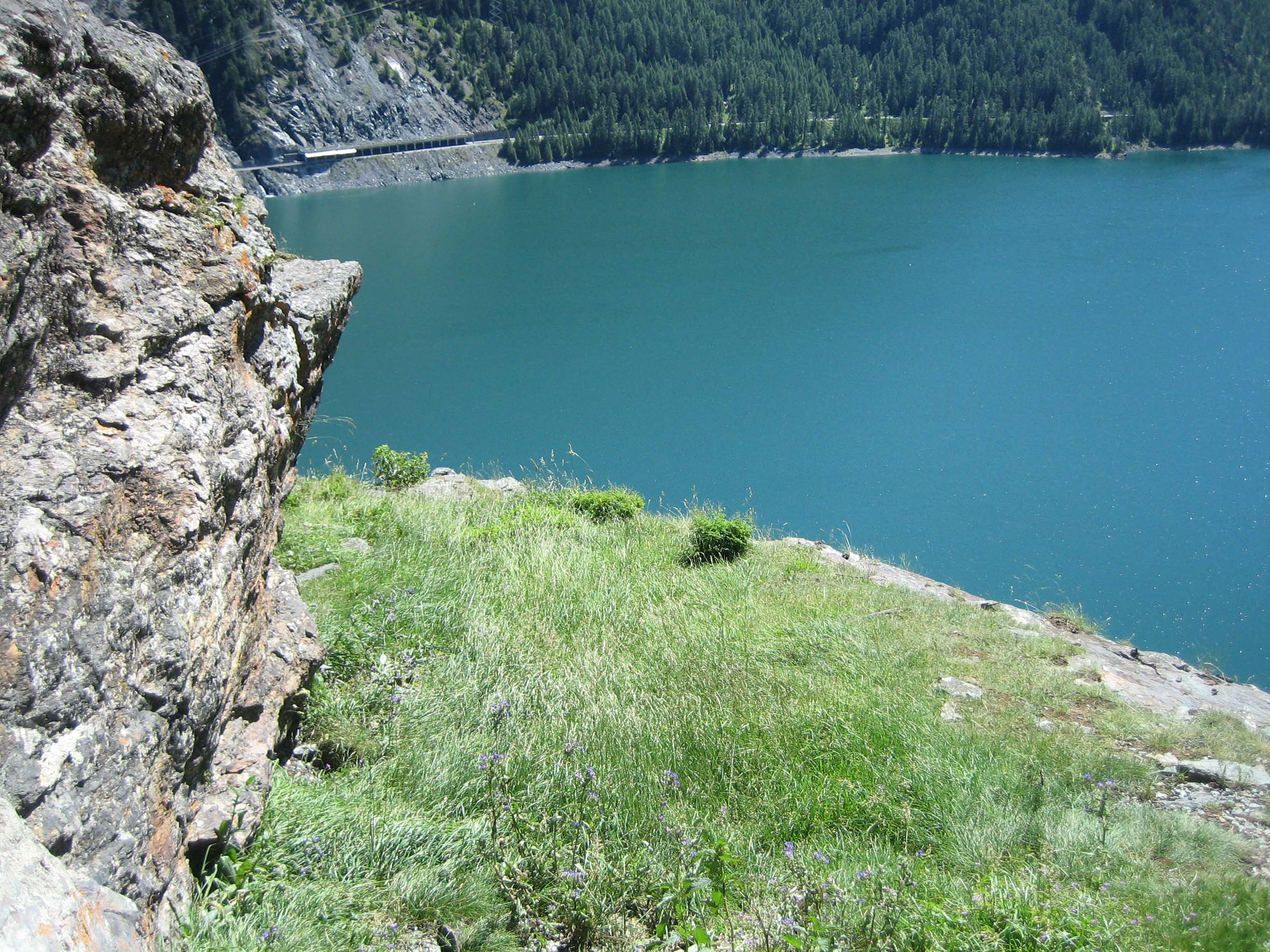
Southern terrace

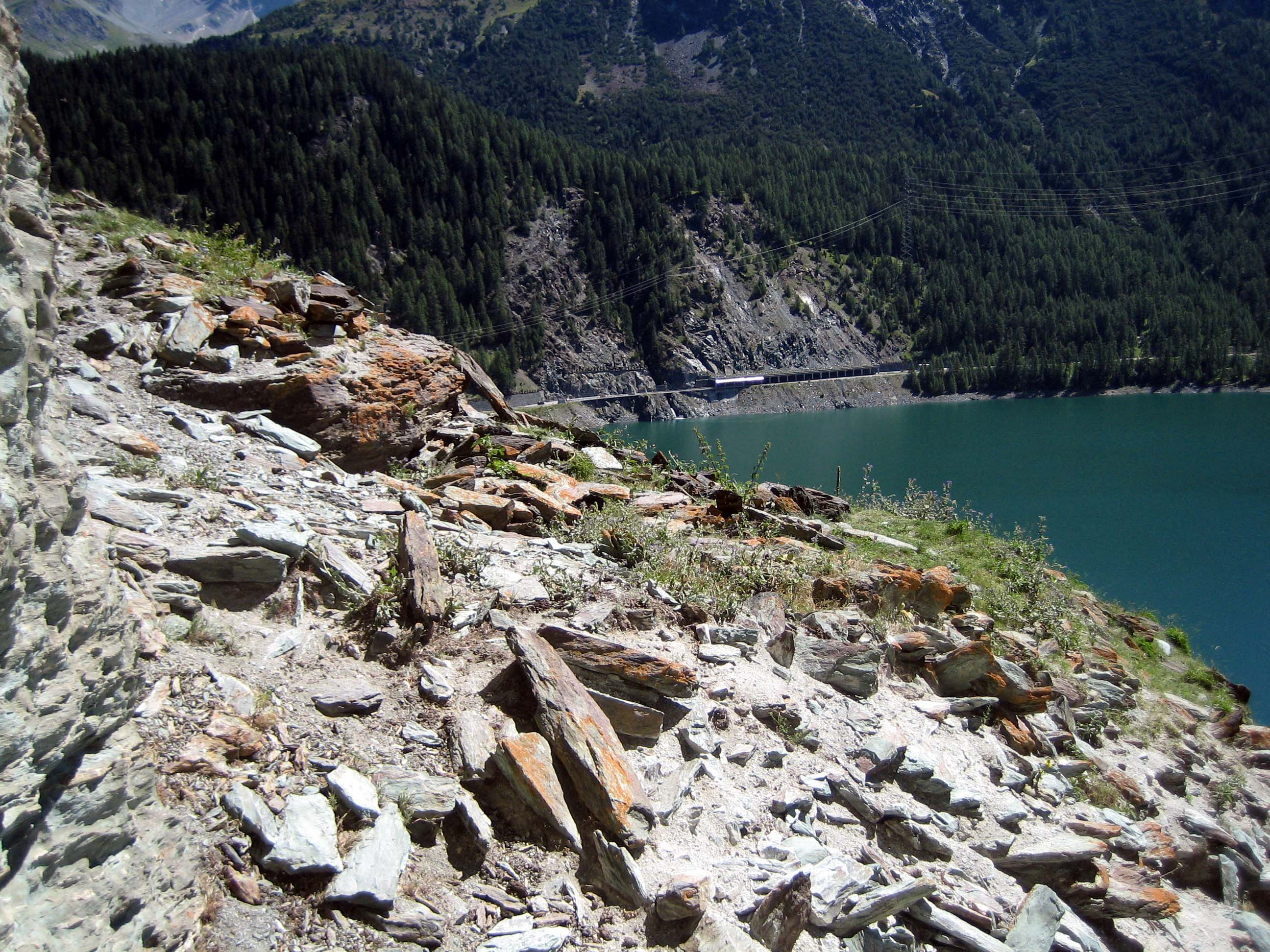
Southern tower house

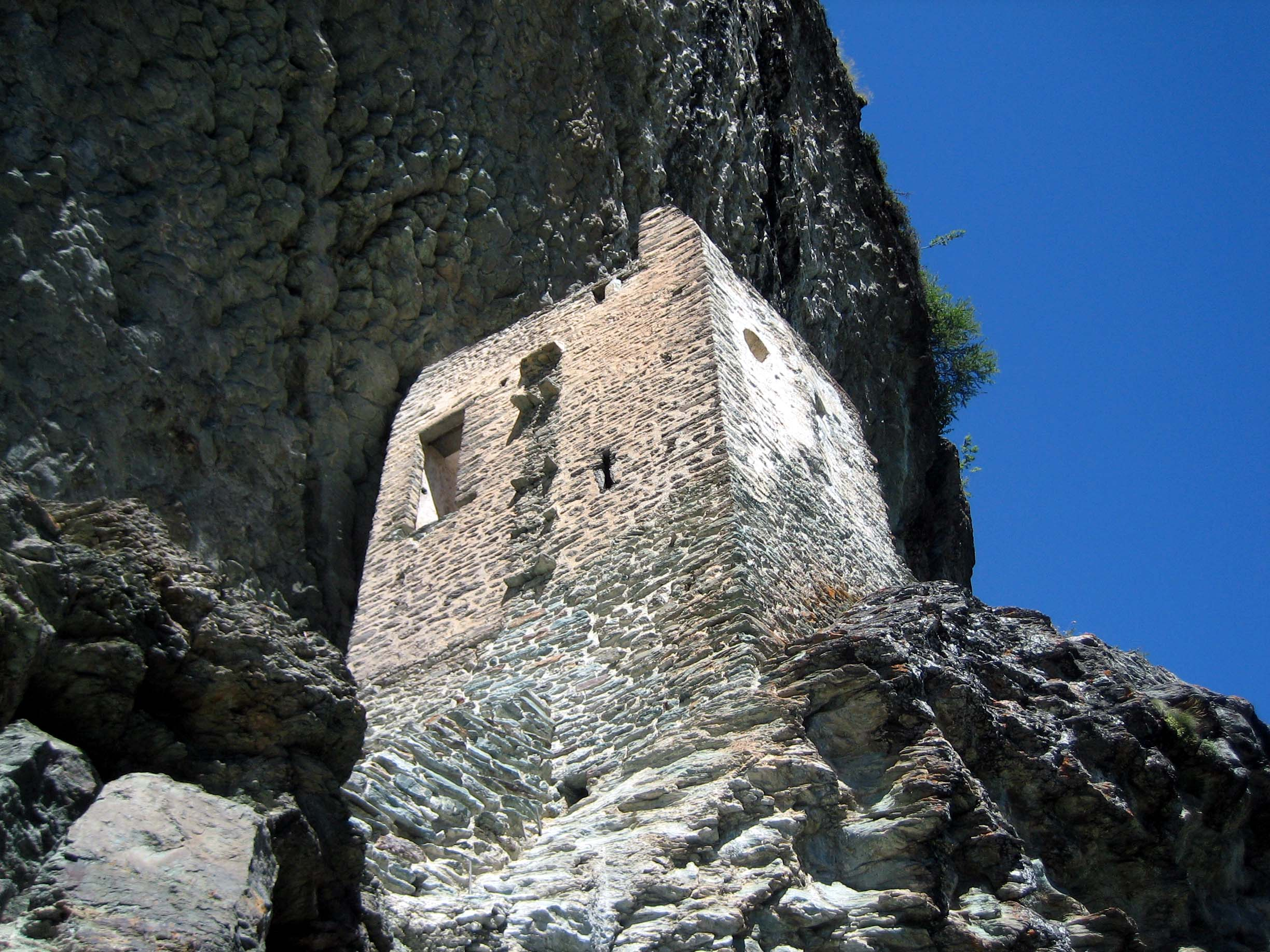
A view of the chapel from the south

== See also ==
List of castles in Switzerland
