= Spliatsch Castle =

Castle in Switzerland

- Burg Spliatsch
- Sur village, Surses
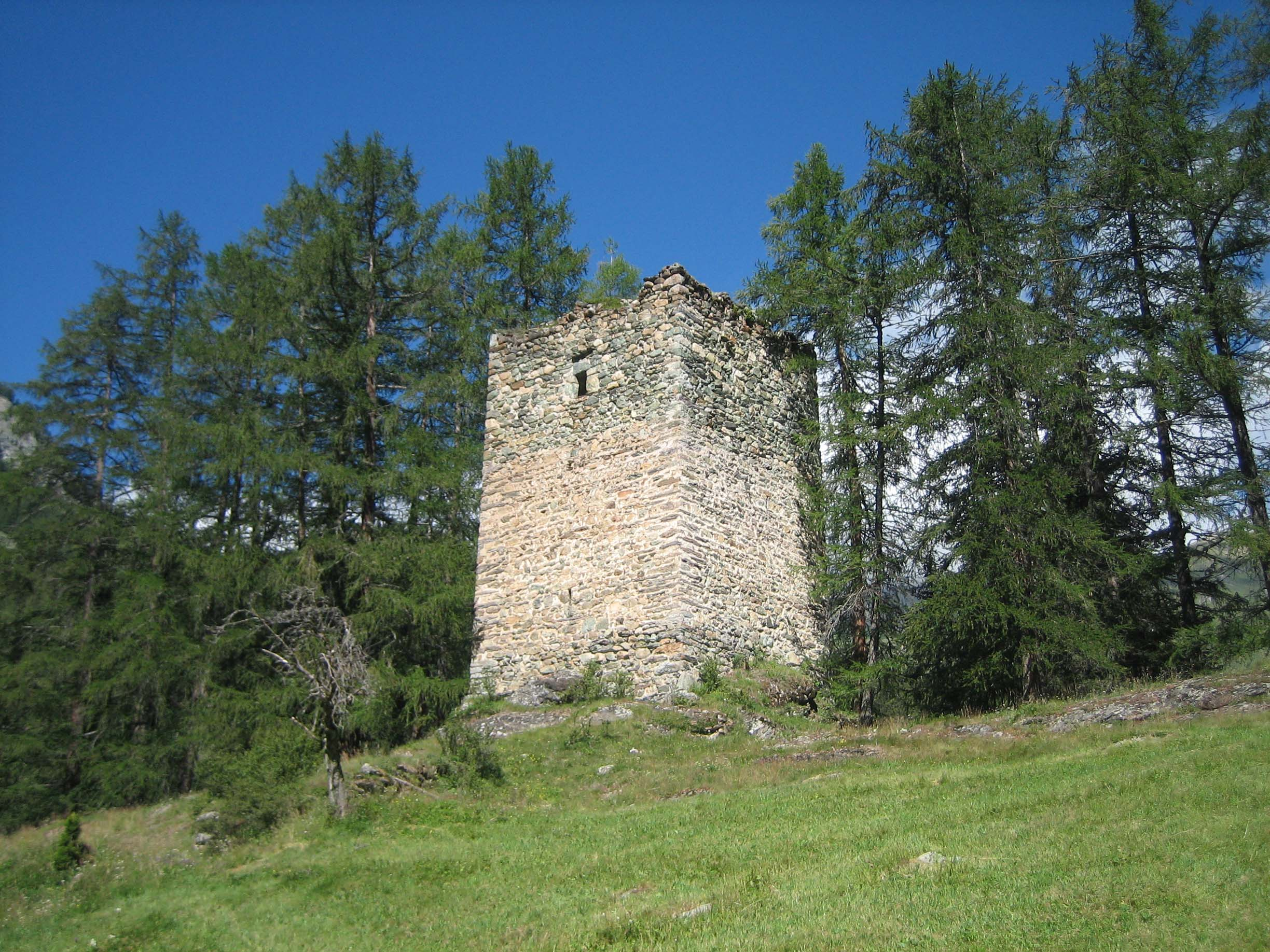
- Ruins of the tower of Spliatsch Castle

Site information
- Type: hill castle
- Code: CH-GR
- Condition: ruin

Location
- Coordinates: 46°31′01″N 9°37′37″E
- Height: 1,589 m above the sea

Site history
- Built: around 1200
- Materials: rubble stone

Spliatsch Castle (German: Burg Spliatsch) is a ruined castle in the municipality of Surses in the Albula Region in the canton of Graubünden in Switzerland.

== History ==
Very little is known about the early history of this castle. It was built along the important trade road that led over the Julier and Septimer Passes probably in the 12th or 13th century. A local noble family of the same name existed during that time and may have built the castle. In that case, when they died out in the early 13th century the castle was inherited by Marmels family. It is also possible that the castle was built by the Marmels family directly to support Marmels Castle which is only 1 km (0.62 mi) away. The earliest mention of Spliatsch is in 1193 when, at the request of the emperor, Andreas von Marmels imprisoned the papal legate Cintius there.

In 1486 the castle was inherited by Anton and Augustin de Beccaria from their mother Anna von Marmels. However, the surrounding farm and pastures were rented out. At that time the tower was still in good condition and the renters were required to look after it and repair the roof as needed. It is unclear if the de Beccarias ever lived in the tower. In the early 16th century the Marmels family reacquired the castle. After Hans von Marmels, the last of the line, died in 1550 the castle was probably abandoned. By the 17th century it was a ruin.

== Castle site ==
The tower is 8 m × 8 m (26 ft × 26 ft) and three stories tall. The walls are 1.4 m (4.6 ft) thick at the base. The main entrance is located on the west side on the second story. On the inside traces of the original plaster and the chimney of a fireplace are visible. Almost nothing remains of the castle walls and outbuildings.

== Gallery ==
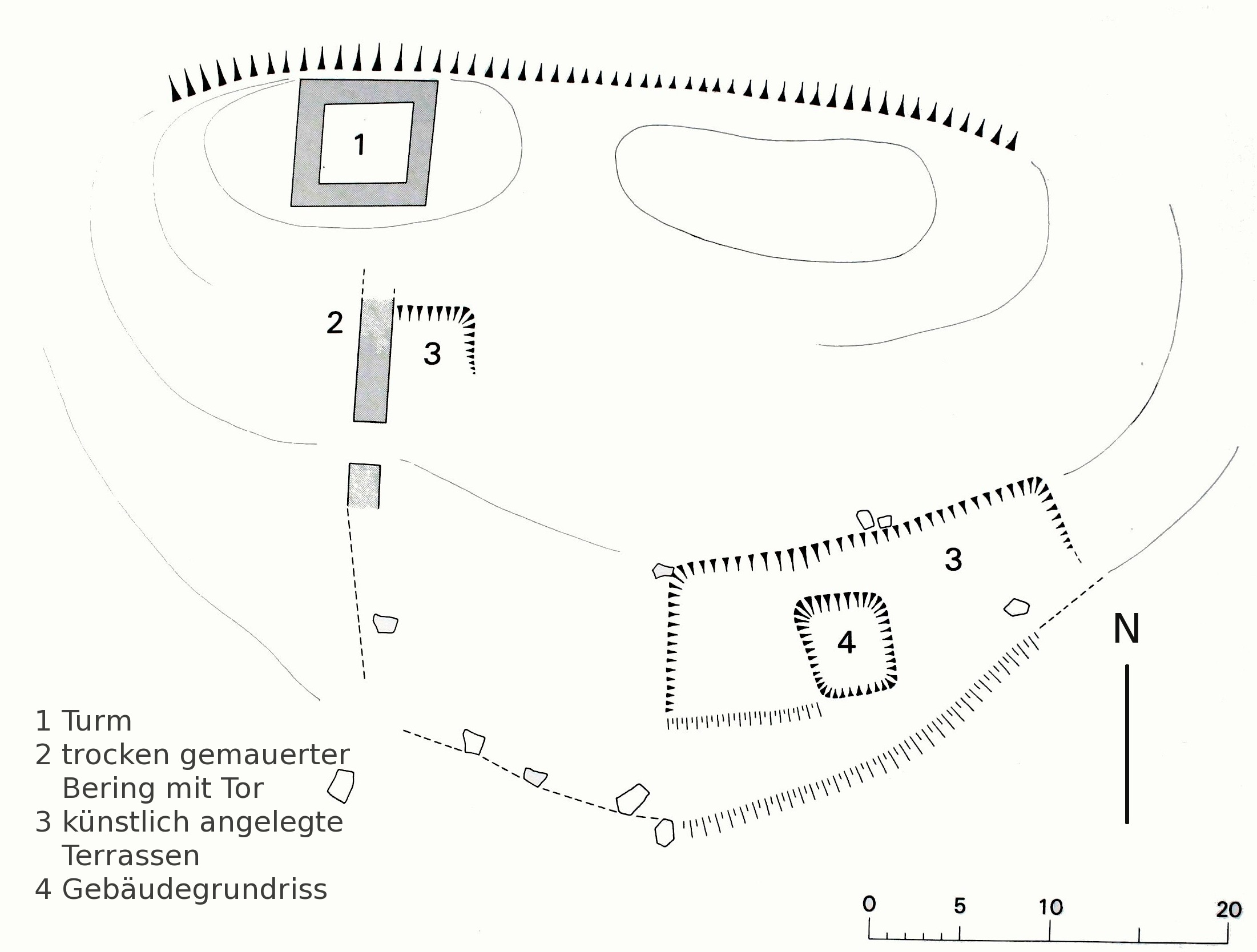
Plan of the castle

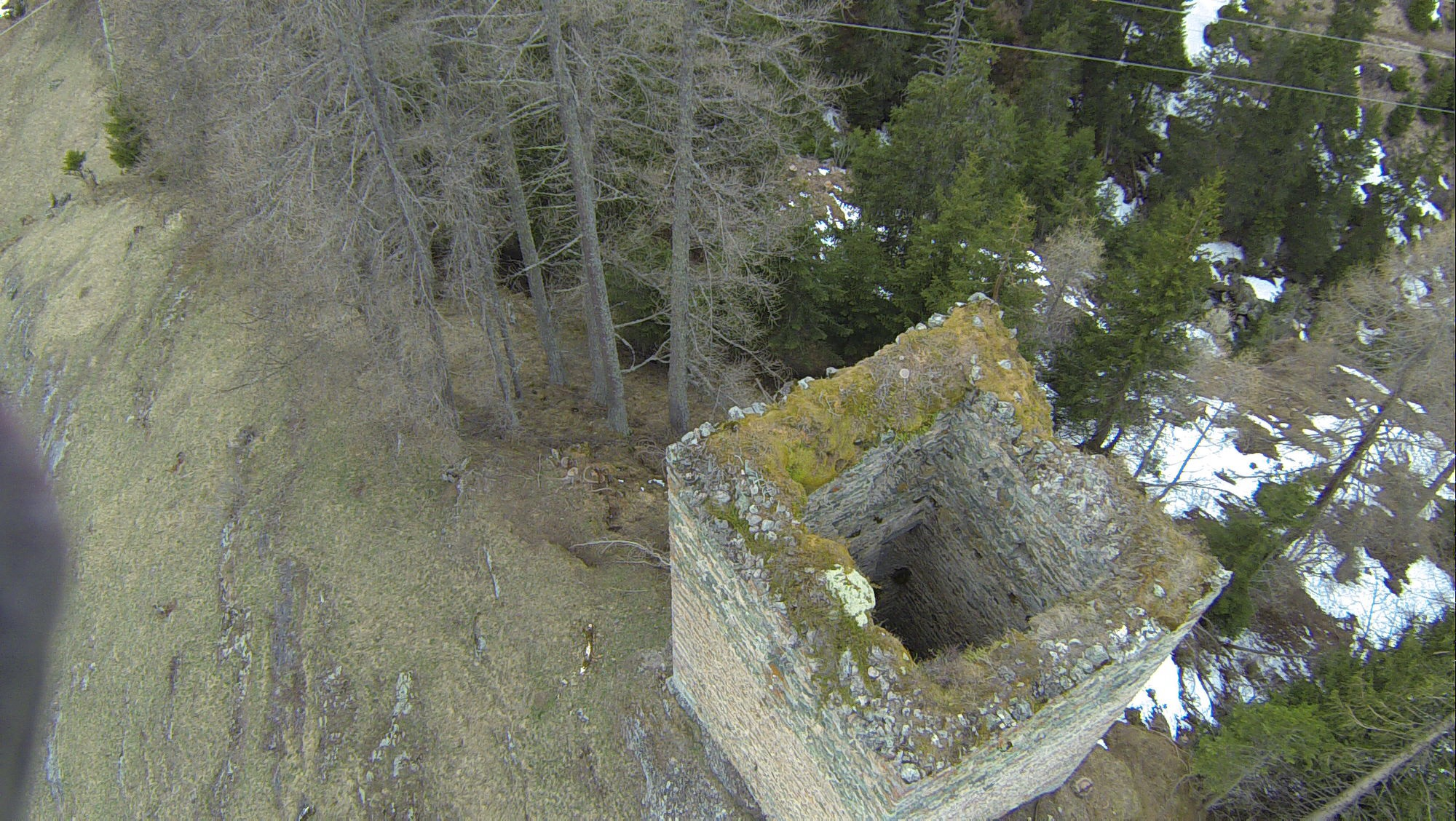
Aerial view of the castle

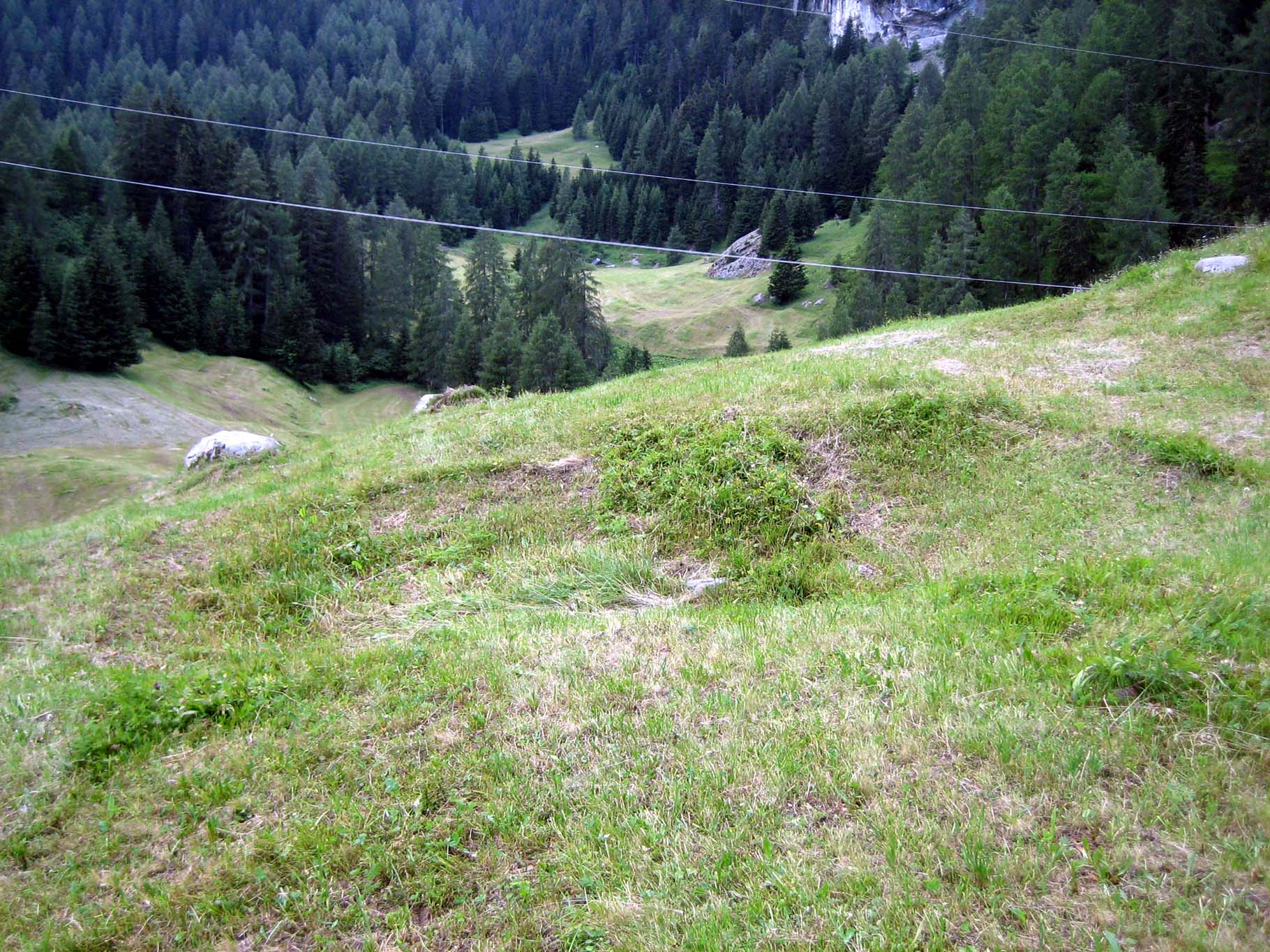
Location of an outbuilding

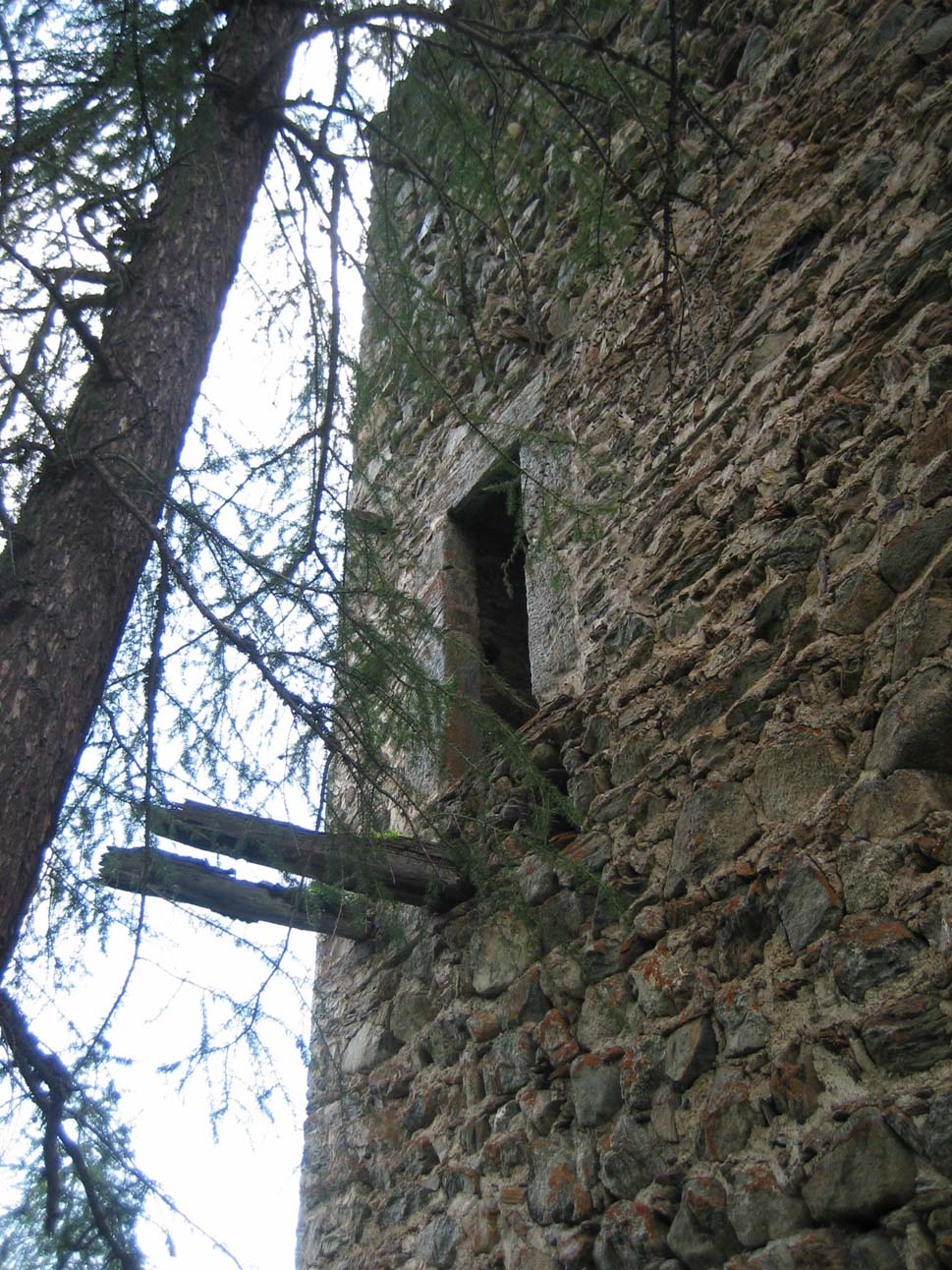
Main entrance into the castle

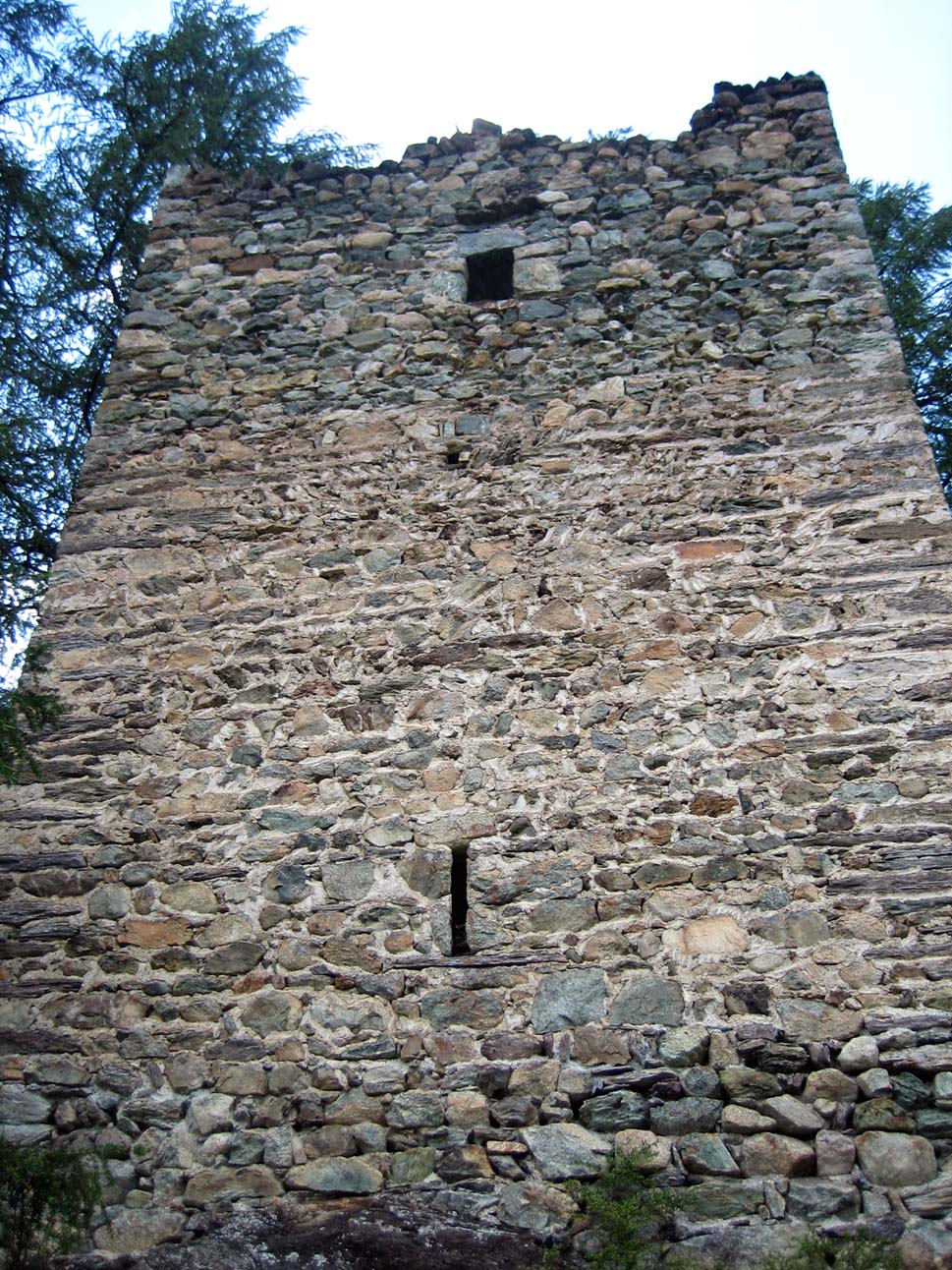
South wall of the castle

== See also ==
List of castles in Switzerland
